= I.R.S. (song) =

2008 song by Guns N' Roses

Song by Guns N' Roses

from the album Chinese Democracy
- Released: November 23, 2008
- Genre: Hard rock
- Length: 4:28
- Label: Geffen, Black Frog
- Songwriters: Axl Rose; Paul Tobias; Dizzy Reed
- Producers: Axl Rose; Caram Costanzo

"I.R.S." is a song by the American hard rock band Guns N' Roses, released as the eleventh track on their 2008 album Chinese Democracy. It was written by Axl Rose, Paul Tobias and Dizzy Reed. An early version of the song leaked in 2003 when baseball player Mike Piazza played it on New York radio. In February 2006, a full studio version leaked online and was played across radio stations without the band's authorization, reaching number 49 on the Radio & Records Active Rock airplay chart. The band first performed it live later that year.

== Background and recording ==
Studio engineer Dave Dominguez, who worked with the band from January to August 1998, recalled "IRS" as the name of a loop that Dizzy Reed had him record, though he was unsure whether it was a song title at that stage. The song was one of several Rose previewed for Rolling Stone in February 2000 in his first interview in six years.

Sean Beavan is credited with recording, digital editing, arrangement, and initial production on the track. Rose's vocals on the track, like those on most of the album, date to 1999 sessions with Beavan. Guitarist Ron "Bumblefoot" Thal, who joined in 2006, later described his own contribution as rhythm playing, with sleazy, riff-based parts throughout.

== Composition and lyrics ==
The song runs 4:28. Rose wrote the lyrics, and the music is credited to Rose, Tobias and Reed. The lyrics have Rose threatening to call the President, a private investigator, the Internal Revenue Service and the FBI. In Rolling Stone, David Fricke described the line "I bet you think I'm doin' this all for my health" as one of several glancing references on the album to what Rose knows many people think of him.

Dave Everley of Classic Rock described the song as a mix of self-pitying regret and venomous defiance, with music that moves from stripped-down restraint to a punk-metal howl. Dan Weiss of Spin heard a four-chord structure built around a riff he compared to Nirvana's "In Bloom", with a few trip-hop passages in between, and called its chorus the most memorable on the album.

Critics have read the lyrics as autobiographical. Classic Rock reported that the song was reputedly inspired by the lawsuits Rose faced in the 1990s, including some brought by his former wife Erin Everly and former girlfriend Stephanie Seymour. Art Tavana of LA Weekly described it as a semi-bitter song about an ex-wife's lawyers, and Dave de Sylvia of Sputnik Music read it as a light-hearted send-up of Rose's former bandmates' fondness for lawsuits.

== Leaks and radio airplay ==
"I.R.S." was among the first Chinese Democracy songs to reach the public. On August 29, 2003, Mike Piazza, then catcher for the New York Mets, brought a CD labeled "New GNR" to Friday Night Rocks with Eddie Trunk on New York station Q104.3 and played the track. He said it had been sent to him a few weeks earlier. Station program director Bob Buchmann told MTV that listeners asked for it to be replayed but that the band's management objected to it being aired. Eddie Trunk said the song reminded him of the Use Your Illusion era with some modern touches, and that a loop at the start gave way to the band's usual dramatic hard rock.

A full-length, high-quality version leaked online on February 15, 2006. Rock stations added "I.R.S." to their playlists, and for the week ending February 24 it reached number 49 on the Radio & Records Active Rock National Airplay chart. The band's management did not publicly confirm that the songs were the band's or from Chinese Democracy, though manager Merck Mercuriadis ordered websites to remove links to the songs and sent cease-and-desist orders to radio stations. Boston station WAAF nevertheless still had "I.R.S." in heavy rotation days later.

== Live performances ==
"I.R.S." was first performed on May 12, 2006, at the Hammerstein Ballroom in New York City, on the opening night of four warm-up shows for the band's European tour. It was the band's first concert since 2002 and the first with guitarist Ron "Bumblefoot" Thal, and the song debuted alongside "Better" and "There Was a Time". It came late in the set, shortly before the encore.

Reviews of the New York shows were muted about the new material. Ben Ratliff of The New York Times noted that the crowd did not go wild for songs like "I.R.S.", which were already easy to find online, while Bob Gendron of the Chicago Tribune said it flirted with burbling electronics, and MTV News reported that the crowd sang along to the leaked songs, including "I.R.S.".

The song was performed throughout the Chinese Democracy Tour, whose European leg began in Madrid on May 25, 2006. "I.R.S." remained in the band's sets through the year, including at KROQ's Inland Invasion festival in Devore, California, on September 23, 2006. The band played the song 98 times in total: 57 times in 2006, 19 in 2007, three in 2009 and 19 in 2010. Its last recorded performance was on October 23, 2010, at the Pavelló Olímpic de Badalona in Badalona, Spain.

== Critical reception ==
Brandon Daviet of Colorado's Marquee magazine, previewing several leaked tracks in April 2006, called "I.R.S." a strong, lean song with acoustic guitars and an unforgettable chorus, and described it as Rose at his paranoid best. The Associated Press described it, after the leak, as closer to the band's sound of the past, with powerful guitar solos and a classic rock flavor. When the band played the song at Inland Invasion, Ann Powers of the Los Angeles Times called it abstract but promising, though she said it and "Better" could not match the excitement of older songs. Reviewing the finished album at a listening session in November 2008, Luke Turner of The Quietus called "I.R.S." a pretty decent track, but not good enough given the grandeur of the Use Your Illusion albums, and found the guitars plodding next to those of the band's earlier work.

Several reviewers singled out "I.R.S." as one of the album's stronger or more conventional rock tracks. Chuck Klosterman of The A.V. Club named it, along with the title track, as one of the album's two strongest rock cuts, where Rose balances the many elements he tends to pack into each song. Jon Dolan of Blender said it swaggers and slugs like late-1980s Guns N' Roses. Sarah Rodman of The Boston Globe cited it, with the title track, for blistering guitar work by Robin Finck and Buckethead, and Greg Kot of the Chicago Tribune called it the album's catchiest song. Stephen Thomas Erlewine of AllMusic described it as "grinding". In The Observer, Kitty Empire wrote that it "almost sounds like a proper Guns song". Alexis Petridis of The Guardian found it a jarring change of volume after "Sorry", as though played by a different band in a different decade, which he took as a sign of how much the album sounds like a compilation.

Others were less enthusiastic. Evan Sawdey of PopMatters called it a competent rocker that could have sat on either Use Your Illusion album, but said that in 2008 it sounded "tired and rehashed", and he counted it among the songs with "swiped hip-hop beats". Ian Cohen of Pitchfork said its chorus was as big as those on the Illusion albums but was dampened by "empty conspiracy theorizing". Ceiri O'Driscoll of musicOMH heard it as another power ballad, with a "tremulous little vocal lick of surprising tenderness".

In 2014, Ultimate Classic Rock included the song among five Chinese Democracy tracks "you need to hear again", calling it a churning rocker that does little the Use Your Illusion albums had not done, but whose catchy chorus, with Rose's rasp fitting the familiar guitar crunch, would have made it a high point of those records.

The song appears in a number of critics' rankings of the band's catalogue. Spin placed it 51st of 79 songs and praised it as a relatively simple track on a complicated album. Classic Rock ranked it 43rd of 50, citing its shifts between restraint and aggression. Ultimate Classic Rock ranked it 35th of 84, noting a vocal reminiscent of Dave Mustaine of Megadeth and describing it as a "musically schizophrenic" production piece that ends in a blazing guitar solo. Loudwire ranked it 50th of 70, saying that an opening which promises a long, moody track instead leads to a shorter song whose atmosphere swings from beauty to angst, and naming a high guitar note near the end as the highlight of the song and the album. Cuepoint's Jay Busbee ranked it 63rd of 80, calling it relatively insignificant and a patchwork of several songs, though he liked its guitar solos. WMMR's Erica Banas ranked it 68th of 87 and described it as a vivid picture of a messy breakup with Rose. LA Weekly ranked it 53rd of 64 studio-album songs, praising Buckethead's solo. The Houston station The Eagle ranked it 66th of 84, liking its edge but finding Rose's vocals below his best.

Rankings of "I.R.S."
Publication	Year	Article	Ranking	Ref.
Classic Rock	2023	"The 50 greatest Guns N' Roses songs ever, and the stories behind them"	43 of 50	
Cuepoint	2016	"All 80 Guns N' Roses Songs, Ranked"	63 of 80	
The Eagle (Houston)	2025	"Ranking Every Song by Guns N' Roses"	66 of 84	
LA Weekly	2016	"The Ultimate Ranking of Every Guns N' Roses Song"	53 of 64	
Loudwire	2024	"Guns N' Roses All Songs Ranked"	50 of 70	
MetalSucks	2022	"All 81 Guns N' Roses Songs, Ranked From Worst to Best"	42 of 81	
Spin	2016	"Every Guns N' Roses Song, Ranked"	51 of 79	
Ultimate Classic Rock	2024	"All 84 Guns N' Roses Songs Ranked Worst to Best"	35 of 84	
WMMR	2020	"Guns N' Roses: All Songs Ranked"	68 of 87	

== Personnel ==
Credits adapted from the album's liner notes.

Guns N' Roses

- Axl Rose – lead vocals, arrangements, digital editing, mixing, production
- Robin Finck – lead guitar, rhythm guitar, guitar solo, arrangements
- Ron "Bumblefoot" Thal – lead guitar, rhythm guitar
- Buckethead – lead guitar, rhythm guitar, guitar solo
- Paul Tobias – rhythm guitar, arrangements
- Tommy Stinson – bass
- Brain – drums, drum machine, drum programming
- Frank Ferrer – drums
- Dizzy Reed – keyboards
- Chris Pitman – sub bass, twelve-string guitar

Additional personnel

- Caram Costanzo – engineering, digital editing, production, mixing
- Eric Caudieux – digital editing
- Sean Beavan – recording, digital editing, arrangements, initial production
- Andy Wallace – mixing
