= This I Love =

2008 song by Guns N' Roses

Song by Guns N' Roses

from the album Chinese Democracy
- Released: November 23, 2008
- Recorded: 1992; 1998–2007
- Length: 5:34
- Label: Geffen, Black Frog
- Songwriter: Axl Rose
- Producers: Axl Rose; Caram Costanzo

"This I Love" is a song by the American rock band Guns N' Roses, and the thirteenth track on their sixth studio album, Chinese Democracy (2008). Written solely by vocalist Axl Rose, it is a piano-led ballad that was written during the Use Your Illusion Tour, more than fifteen years before the album's release. It has drawn comparisons to the works of Queen, Elton John and Andrew Lloyd Webber from critics.

== Background ==
In a December 1992 interview with Hit Parader, Rose said he had written and recorded a new love song called "This I Love" that he wanted on the next Guns N' Roses album, calling it "the heaviest thing that I've ever done". In a November 1993 interview with Raw, he repeated the remark in the context of the follow-up to the Use Your Illusion albums, saying that the band had not yet collaborated on many new songs but that he had written this one.

Rose later said the song was written in France. At concerts in Amnéville and Paris in September 2010, he told audiences that he realized during the first verse that he had written it there, and that it might be the only Guns N' Roses song written in France. Craig Duswalt, Rose's personal assistant during the Use Your Illusion touring, said in 2014 that he was present while Rose wrote the song in hotel rooms on the tour and watched it go through several versions.

Dave Dominguez, an engineer who worked on the Chinese Democracy sessions, said the song dated from the Illusion era. He said locating its multitrack tapes had taken weeks, because the band finished recording the Use Your Illusion albums while touring and the reels had ended up in different cities, including Paris, London and Sydney. Dominguez recalled that in 1998, producer Mike Clink asked him to locate the tapes for a possible film placement. He said Rose came to the studio to identify the section of the song he wanted, and described what he heard as a piano ballad that differed from the version later released on Chinese Democracy. He also recalled that Rose, hearing a whispered line at the end of the recording that Dominguez remembered as addressing Rose's then-girlfriend, model Stephanie Seymour, told him to erase it, which he did.

The song was considered for use in What Dreams May Come, the 1998 Robin Williams film. The film's music supervisor, Dawn Soler, said Rose had been enthusiastic about the film, but ultimately director Vincent Ward decided against using the song.

== Recording and production ==
Howard Karp, who worked on the song in 2000, said that only he and Rose were in the studio at the time and described it as a simple piano ballad. By the time the album was being finished, Rose had misgivings about including the song. In December 2008, he said he had not wanted to use "This I Love" in any form, and that Robin Finck and Costanzo had insisted on it, winning the support of bassist Tommy Stinson and the rest of the band. He also said the song was still the heaviest thing he had written, described composing its bridge as a healing experience, and said the string melody in that section had originally been written over a hip-hop loop. He called it the most emotional song for him to sing on the album and said that its orchestral bridge was the part of the album he was proudest of at that moment.

The orchestral arrangement is credited to composer Marco Beltrami, with choir and additional horn arrangements by Suzy Katayama and harp by Patti Hood.

Finck, who plays the lead guitar part and solo, said he approached the part by listening to the track several times without playing, trying to hear what would come naturally and thinking in phrases, as a horn player would. Ron "Bumblefoot" Thal contributed rhythm guitar underneath the arrangement.

== Composition and lyrics ==
The song opens with Rose's voice and piano and gradually adds strings, harp, and choir, building to an orchestral bridge before a guitar solo by Finck.

Rose has said the song was written for a particular person, and the person had thanked him for "the gift of your soul".

== Live performances ==
"This I Love" was first performed on December 11, 2009, as the opening song of the encore at the first show of the Chinese Democracy Tour's 2009 leg, in Taipei. It was played again in Tokyo eight days later, and remained in the set in 2010; at the January 28 show in Toronto, it was an encore number before "Paradise City".

The song stayed in the band's repertoire for the Not in This Lifetime... Tour, on which it was played 152 times, and has been performed nearly 400 times in total.

== Reception ==
Reviews of the song were divided. Raoul Hernandez of The Austin Chronicle thought the piano and relatively unadorned opening verse worked, with strings softening Rose's high register and a guitar solo that evoked Slash. Chuck Klosterman of The A.V. Club described it as "[a] fragile ballad ... sad, melodramatic, and pleasurably traditional," noting that its lyrics often feel as if Axl Rose is addressing himself and characterizing the album's overall lyrical approach as "effectively narcissistic." Kelefa Sanneh of Slate called it "a chiming ballad that boasts the album’s most shapely melody," also framing it as one of the self-referential songs reflecting on the prolonged making of Chinese Democracy. Mikael Wood of SPIN grouped it among the album’s standouts, while Alex Young of Consequence of Sound described the song as “quite possibly the album’s peak”. David Alejandro Cepeda Benavides and Roland Bearne of Classic Rock both called it the best song on the album.

Ian Cohen of Pitchfork noted it amongst the piano-led ballads on the album that reminiscent of Journey and REO Speedwagon. Beats Per Minute called it the album's most self-indulgent and melodramatic moment, though it praised Finck's solo for returning the song to "Don't Cry" territory. Clash felt the introspection of the opening voice-and-piano section was shattered once heavy guitars were added. Greg Kot of the Chicago Tribune compared the song to the works of Andrew Lloyd Webber. Jon Pareles of The New York Times called it the album's "most maudlin track", saying Rose "hams it up further with a vibrato vocal homage to Freddie Mercury."

Dave de Sylvia of Sputnikmusic compared Finck's playing to Gary Moore's blues-rock style but called the ballad otherwise tepid, and named it, alongside "Scraped", as the album's only obvious weak points. In a first-listen track-by-track, Metal Injection called it an "unabashedly schmaltzy love ballad" but argued that it fit Rose's ambitions better than an attempt to remake the band's early sound would have. The Quietus was dismissive, calling it “a bit of a schlocky ballad with some dodgy rhyming” that offers “hints of Queen, but not bold enough to lift the track,” and ultimately describing it as “more light drizzle than ‘November Rain.’”

In a later retrospective, Metal Hammer referred to the song as “overwrought”. Spin staff writer Andrew Unterberger called it an "oppressively overdramatic climax" to Chinese Democracy by the band's own standards and the main reason the album feels far longer than it is, comparing it to Webber's The Phantom of the Opera. Jay Busbee, writing in Cuepoint, described it as a spiritual successor to "November Rain", a "pleading piano hymn overproduced to the point of suffocation", and likened the result to a mid-1970s Elton John performance "under attack". L.A. Weekly called it Rose's saddest song, marked by sorrow rather than bitterness. Matthew Wilkening of Ultimate Classic Rock, also noting the Queen and Elton John influences, called it a "baroque piano-based heartbreaker" where Rose "demonstrates once again that there are very few artists who can bring drama into rock and roll better than he can".

Band members have spoken favorably of the song. Bumblefoot called it a "beautiful ballad" and one of his favorites on the album, guitarist DJ Ashba named it his favorite Chinese Democracy track, citing the "rollercoaster of emotions" it goes through and drummer Frank Ferrer praised Rose's vocal performance.

When Slash rejoined the band in 2016, Anthony Kuzminski of antiMusic favorably reviewed the song during a live review, saying, "With Slash, ‘This I Love’ feels like a long-lost prime Elton John cut from the early 70s", grouping it with other Chinese Democracy songs that benefited from Slash’s playing.

Despite not being released as a single, the song charted 15th on the Poland LP3 charts.

=== Rankings ===
Rankings of "This I Love"
Publication	Year	List	Rank	Ref.
L.A. Weekly	2016	The Ultimate Ranking of Every Guns N' Roses Song	51st of 64	
Spin	2016	Every Guns N' Roses Song, Ranked	76th of 79	
Cuepoint (Medium)	2016	All 80 Guns N' Roses Songs, Ranked	66th of 80	
WMMR	2020	Guns N' Roses: All 87 Songs Ranked	66th of 87	
MetalSucks	2022	All 81 Guns N' Roses Songs, Ranked From Worst to Best	37th of 81	
Classic Rock	2023	The 50 Greatest Guns N' Roses Songs	24th of 50	
Ultimate Classic Rock	2024	All 84 Guns N' Roses Songs Ranked Worst to Best	25th of 84	
Loudwire	2024	Every Guns N' Roses Song Ranked	43rd of 70	
The Eagle (Houston)	2025	Ranking Every Song by Guns N' Roses	34th of 84	

== Personnel ==
Credits adapted from the album's liner notes.

Guns N' Roses

- Axl Rose – lead vocals, keyboards, synthesizers, piano, arrangements and digital editing, production, mixing
- Robin Finck – lead and rhythm guitar, guitar solo, arrangements
- Ron "Bumblefoot" Thal – lead and rhythm guitar
- Tommy Stinson – bass
- Dizzy Reed – synthesizers, additional arrangement
- Chris Pitman – keyboards, sub-bass, synthesizers, additional arrangement, digital editing
- Brain – drums

Additional personnel

- Marco Beltrami – orchestra, orchestral arrangement
- Suzy Katayama – choir and additional horn arrangements
- Patti Hood – harp
- Caram Costanzo – sub drums, engineering, digital editing, production
- Eric Caudieux – sub drums, digital editing
- Andy Wallace – mixing
- Bob Ludwig – mastering
