= Street of Dreams (Guns N' Roses song) =

2009 promotional single by Guns N' Roses

Promotional single by Guns N' Roses

from the album Chinese Democracy
- Released: March 14, 2009
- Recorded: 1999–2006
- Genre: Hard rock
- Length: 4:46
- Label: Geffen
- Songwriters: Axl Rose; Dizzy Reed; Tommy Stinson; Robin Finck; Paul Tobias
- Producers: Axl Rose; Caram Costanzo

"Street of Dreams" is a song by the American rock band Guns N' Roses, the fourth track on their 2008 album Chinese Democracy. A piano-led ballad with orchestral arrangements, it is credited to Axl Rose, Dizzy Reed, Tommy Stinson, Robin Finck, and Paul Tobias. First performed in January 2001 under the working title "The Blues", it circulated among fans for years before Rose renamed it for the album.

Geffen Records serviced the song to radio in March 2009 as the album's third single, but it was not released commercially. It reached number 44 on Canada's Active Rock chart in late 2009. Critics often compared it to "November Rain" and the piano ballads of Elton John.

== Background and composition ==
Rose is credited as the principal author, and bandmates have described adding to the song over the long Chinese Democracy sessions. Stinson said Rose had most of it written when he brought in the bridge bass line and chord progression. Reed said that while the band was "just playing around with it" he developed the intro and bridge, and Ron "Bumblefoot" Thal said he contributed rhythm parts and riffs. A&R executive Tom Zutaut has said "The Blues" had a well-finished version when he joined the project in 2001.

For the album, Rose renamed the song. In a December 2008 message to fans, he said he had never been comfortable with "The Blues", which he felt belonged on a bluesier song, and that he had always associated the song with Hollywood and the Walk of Fame.

The finished track is a piano-driven ballad with string and orchestral arrangements credited to Reed, Paul Buckmaster and Marco Beltrami, and guitar solos credited to Finck and Buckethead. Rolling Stone credited Reed with the "Elton John-style" piano, and Consequence of Sound called it an "existential ballad".

== Release and chart performance ==
Geffen and Black Frog issued a promotional CD single in 2009, with a 4:21 radio edit and the album version. Because it was never a commercial single, it was ineligible for most national singles charts. Its radio push in Canada came late in 2009, ahead of the band's early-2010 Canadian tour dates, and it debuted at number 44 on the Canadian Active Rock chart.

Chart (2009)	Peak position
Canada Active Rock	44

== Critical reception ==
Reviewers of Chinese Democracy often treated "Street of Dreams" as the album's most familiar-sounding ballad. The Star Tribune said the song "deserves to be a 'November Rain'-style crossover pop hit". Consequence of Sound called it the ballad for listeners tired of paying for "November Rain" on the jukebox and named it, with "Better", as one of the two songs at the heart of the album. Beats Per Minute heard it as Rose's update of "Estranged", and Rolling Stone's David Fricke singled out the looping guitar squeals over "the grand anguish of 'Street of Dreams'". Sputnikmusic's Dave de Sylvia called it the album's "token piano ballad", noting it was one of the songs that survived from the band's early live shows.

Not every reviewer was won over. In a review for NPR's Morning Edition, Stephen Thompson said the album turns flabby after its opening run of bombastic songs, and that the ballad shows why the phrase "street of dreams" should be banned from rock music.

=== Retrospective assessments ===
In later reassessments, Metal Hammer's Merlin Alderslade, defending the album in 2018, paired "Street of Dreams" with "If the World" as anthems worthy of the band's name, noting a piano line that comes straight out of Elton John's songwriting. Reed has repeatedly named it a personal favorite, saying in 2024 that it was his pick from the album because of the piano part and the string arrangements the band worked on.

Rankings of the band's full catalog have placed the song anywhere from 13th to 62nd, and their commentary mostly circles the same comparison with "November Rain". Jay Busbee's list for Cuepoint, the most favorable, placed it 13th of 80 and called it the one song that pulls together what Chinese Democracy was meant to be, among the best of the band's second-tier songs. Steven Hyden, in a list of his 40 favorite Guns N' Roses songs for Uproxx, put it 18th and called it the best song to come out of the Chinese Democracy lineup, crediting Reed's piano for tying it to the Use Your Illusion sound. Ultimate Classic Rock (43rd of 84) described it as the album's first cinematic ballad, cut from the same cloth as "Estranged" or "November Rain" and nearly as spectacular, if not quite as memorable, and Loudwire (44th) heard it as a sequel to "November Rain", a dramatic, grandiose ballad with nods to everyone from Elton John to Queen to Liberace that is "a little overblown but follows a formula Rose had mastered".

Spin placed it 57th of 79; Andrew Unterberger described it as "closer to Bruce Springsteen than to David Coverdale, powerful but with lyrics that might have drawn eye-rolls from Geffen executives given the album's cost." LA Weekly's Art Tavana (46th of 64) said fans wanted it to be the next "November Rain" but that its intensely personal lyrics were not grandiose enough to support the comparison, and Axl Rosenberg of MetalSucks (58th of 81) called it by no means a bad song but a too self-conscious attempt to recreate that song's magic. WMMR's Erica Banas (62nd of 87) described a "grandiose left-turn" of a ballad that becomes enjoyable once the listener adjusts to the genre shift, and Jarrett Huff of Houston's The Eagle (50th of 84) said it felt more like a Guns N' Roses song than most of the album, with a piano that recalls the Use Your Illusion records.

Rankings of "Street of Dreams" among Guns N' Roses songs
Publication	List	Year	Rank
Spin	Every Guns N' Roses Song, Ranked	2016	57 of 79
LA Weekly	The Ultimate Ranking of Every Guns N' Roses Song (studio albums only)	2016	46 of 64
Cuepoint	All 80 Guns N' Roses Songs, Ranked	2016	13 of 80
WMMR	Guns N' Roses: All Songs Ranked	2020	62 of 87
MetalSucks	All 81 Guns N' Roses Songs, Ranked From Worst to Best	2022	58 of 81
Uproxx	The Best Guns N' Roses Songs, Ranked (the author's 40 favorites)	2022	18 of 40
Ultimate Classic Rock	Every Guns N' Roses Song Ranked Worst to Best	2024	43 of 84
Loudwire	Every Guns N' Roses Song Ranked Worst to Best	2024	44 of 70
Houston's Eagle	Ranking Every Song by Guns N' Roses	2025	50 of 84

== Live performances ==
"Street of Dreams" was first played, as "The Blues", on January 1, 2001, at the House of Blues in Las Vegas, at the first concert by the band's new lineup. It was a regular part of setlists on the Chinese Democracy tours and the Up Close and Personal Tour in 2012, and it appears on Appetite for Democracy 3D. Reed has said playing its piano part live is "a treat".

The song then disappeared from the set after December 2012, and it was not played on the reunion-era Not in This Lifetime... Tour (2016–2019). It returned on June 18, 2022, in Prague, as the opening song of the encore in a 30-song set. That performance was the first in nearly ten years, and the first with Slash, Duff McKagan and keyboardist Melissa Reese, who had joined the band in 2016 just before the reunion tour was announced. "Street of Dreams" was played three times in 2022 and again on the 2023 tour, including the opening night in Abu Dhabi.

== Personnel ==
Credits are adapted from the album's liner notes.

Guns N' Roses

- Axl Rose – lead vocals
- Paul Tobias, Richard Fortus and Ron "Bumblefoot" Thal – rhythm guitar
- Robin Finck and Buckethead – lead guitar
- Tommy Stinson – bass, backing vocals
- Brain – drums
- Dizzy Reed – piano, keyboards, backing vocals, synth orchestra
- Chris Pitman – synthesizer, sub bass, programming, keyboards, synth orchestra

Additional credits

- Orchestra – Paul Buckmaster, Marco Beltrami
- Orchestral arrangement – Dizzy Reed, Paul Buckmaster, Marco Beltrami
- Guitar solos – Robin Finck, Buckethead
- Arrangement – Axl Rose, Sean Beavan
- Drum arrangement – Josh Freese, Brain
- Digital editing – Eric Caudieux, Caram Costanzo, Axl Rose, Sean Beavan
- Mixing – Andy Wallace, Caram Costanzo
- Mastering – Bob Ludwig
