= Shackler's Revenge =

Song by Guns N' Roses

from the album Chinese Democracy
- A-side: "Chinese Democracy"
- Released: September 14, 2008
- Recorded: 2000–2007
- Genre: Industrial rock; electronic rock; nu metal; sludge metal; alternative rock
- Length: 3:37
- Label: Geffen
- Songwriters: Axl Rose; Robin Finck; Brian Carroll; Caram Costanzo; Bryan Mantia; Pete Scaturro
- Producers: Axl Rose; Caram Costanzo

"Shackler's Revenge" is a song by Guns N' Roses, and the second track on their sixth studio album, Chinese Democracy. The song was released on September 14, 2008, in the Rock Band 2 video game. The song was written by vocalist Axl Rose, guitarists Robin Finck and Buckethead, drummer Brain, producer Caram Costanzo and engineer Pete Scaturro. It was included as the b-side to the single "Chinese Democracy".

== Background ==
Brain and Buckethead wrote the instrumental base of the song, dating back to a jam in their earliest days in Praxis.

Guitarist Ron "Bumblefoot" Thal plays the solo on fretless guitar, some rhythm guitar, guitar in the pre-chorus, and the ending solo. He stated it was one of the first songs he worked on with the band after joining in 2006.

The song marks a major departure from Guns N' Roses typical sound, incorporating elements of industrial rock, electronic rock, nu metal, sludge rock, and alternative rock. Axl Rose downplayed the industrial label, stating “I don’t really get the “industrial” rap it gets considering these are guitars with very minimal keys.”

The song was leaked to the internet in August 2008. At the time, Rolling Stone described the song, saying "the song’s low crunch sticks with the album’s long-stated industrial leanings, and again, layers upon layers of Axls create a particular sort of demented choir."

Shackler's Revenge was announced as being included in the Rock Band 2 game on July 14, 2008. The song was released when the game launched on September 14, 2008, making it the first official release of new Guns N' Roses material since 1999's "Oh My God". The song was picked for the game because the developers wanted a Guns N' Roses song, then decided they want one that will be on the "mysterious" Chinese Democracy album; Rose helped the team to select the specific song.

The song has been described as having industrial influences, and according to vocalist Axl Rose, was written in reaction to "the insanity of senseless school shootings and also the media trying desperately to make more out of one shooter's preference for the Guns song Brownstone to no avail". Virginia Tech shooter Seung-Hui Cho had written a play based on the lyrics of the Guns N' Roses song "Mr. Brownstone".

Former drummer Brain created a club inspired remix in 2009 for a pending remix album of songs of Chinese Democracy.

== Reception ==
The song drew many comparisons to industrial and electronic acts Nine Inch Nails, The Prodigy, Marilyn Manson, Korn and Rob Zombie.

IGN gave the song a 5.5 (Mediocre) rating, saying "Shackler's Revenge reeks of affluence, sounding more like a one-time wizard of rock playing with ProTools and faceless hired guns in his bedroom palace, creating a song that will ultimately be a disposable hit without any legs to stand on." Common Sense Media gave the song 3 out of 5, stating "There's still some of that dated sound to "Shackler's Revenge", but Axl's distinct wail and a sharp chorus save the song, making it a respectable comeback." Chuck Klosterman, writing for The A.V. Club stated "A song like "Shackler's Revenge" is initially average, until you get to the solo—then it becomes the sonic equivalent of a Russian robot wrestling a reticulating python."

Consequence of Sound reacted positively to the track, saying "(Shackler's) keeps it in the digitized realm, only now there's this decadent dance swing to it. The sludge rock verses may require an adjustment, but the pre-chorus is bouncy and fun, which all lead up to an anthemic chorus that will have everyone's fists in the air. ABC News cited "Shackler's Revenge" and "Chinese Democracy" as "hyperactive bashers that recall GNR splendor." Music Radar gave the song a negative review, stating "Ultimately, Shackler's Revenge finds Axl Rose trapped in a cul-de-sac of his own design. The one-time brash confrontationalist now holes himself up in his Hollywood Xanadu, on his own with no direction home" and criticized it for sounding dated. Metal Injection reacted positively, stating "Axl sounds like he's catching up to the mid-'90s industrial craze, but he's way overdue to cash in on NIN's success. Here it's unlike anything he's tried before, much less anything huge on rock radio these days. I didn't think much of it when it hit Rock Band 2 last fall, but after last night the chorus won't get out of my head."

In February 2016, Spin ranked the song the 18th best Guns N' Roses song, stating "In some ways, this Rock Band-debuted single is just a steroidal update of what the flailing, pointless “Oh My God” was probably supposed to be: screeching Deftones opening riff, programmed industrial funkadoodles last heard in 1997, and disco midsection, check, check, double-check. But in other ways, there's just no other band that sounds like this." In a June 2018 column, Loudwire ranked it 67th out of 87.

== Personnel ==
Credits are adapted from the album's liner notes.

Guns N' Roses

- Axl Rose – lead vocals
- Ron "Bumblefoot" Thal – lead guitar, rhythm guitar, fretless guitar solo
- Robin Finck – lead guitar, rhythm guitar
- Buckethead – lead guitar, rhythm guitar, arrangements
- Tommy Stinson – bass, backing vocals
- Brain – drums, arrangements
- Dizzy Reed – keyboards
- Chris Pitman – sub bass, keyboards, backing vocals

Production

- Axl Rose – production, digital editing
- Caram Costanzo – production, arrangements, digital editing
- Pete Scaturro – arrangements, initial production
- Brain – initial production
- Eric Caudieux – digital editing
