= Chinese Democracy =

2008 studio album by Guns N' Roses

Studio album by Guns N' Roses
- Released: November 23, 2008
- Recorded: 1998–2007
- Studios: Battery (London); The Bennett House (Franklin); Can-Am (Tarzana); Capitol (Hollywood); Cherokee (Hollywood); Electric Lady (New York City); IGA; Studio at the Palms; Rumbo (Canoga Park); Soundtrack; Sunset Sound (Hollywood); Townhouse (London); Village Recorder (Los Angeles); Woodland Ranch
- Genres: Hard rock; industrial rock; electronic rock; nu metal
- Length: 71:14
- Labels: Black Frog; Geffen
- Producers: Axl Rose; Caram Costanzo

Guns N' Roses chronology
Greatest Hits (2004)	Chinese Democracy (2008)	Appetite for Democracy 3D (2014)

Singles from Chinese Democracy
- 1. "Chinese Democracy/Shackler's Revenge" Released: October 22, 2008

Alternate cover

Chinese Democracy is the sixth studio album by the American hard rock band Guns N' Roses, released on November 23, 2008, through Geffen Records and Black Frog. It was their first album of original material since Use Your Illusion I and II (1991), and the first to feature none of the classic members aside from vocalist Axl Rose. The album's development spanned over a decade, becoming one of the most protracted and expensive recording processes in history, with reported costs exceeding $13 million.

Recorded amid lineup upheavals, legal disputes, and leaks, Chinese Democracy saw Rose collaborate with a rotating cast of musicians and producers, including band members Dizzy Reed, Paul Tobias, Robin Finck, Josh Freese, Tommy Stinson, Chris Pitman, Buckethead, Richard Fortus, Ron "Bumblefoot" Thal, Brain and Frank Ferrer, and producers Youth, Sean Beavan, Roy Thomas Baker and Caram Costanzo. Recording began in 1998 with the intention of producing multiple albums; although more than 50 tracks were in development, Rose's inconsistent studio schedule and repeated re‑recordings caused substantial delays in the project's progress. It is the first Guns N' Roses album not produced by Mike Clink; instead, Rose and Costanzo handled production.

The album blends hard rock with industrial and electronic influences, a shift from the band's previous blues and punk-based music. Upon release, it debuted at number three on the Billboard 200. It was certified platinum and received generally favorable reviews for its ambition and vocal performances, though its production and lengthy recording process drew mixed reactions. In the United States, the album was released exclusively via Best Buy, and it was banned in China due to lyrics in the lead single, the title track. The album's release was accompanied by a widely publicized Dr Pepper promotion, with the company offering a free soda to all Americans if the album arrived in 2008. Retrospective assessments have acknowledged its complex legacy, with several critics and publications noting that the album has undergone reevaluation, praised by some for its ambition and scope despite the mythology surrounding its creation.

== Background ==
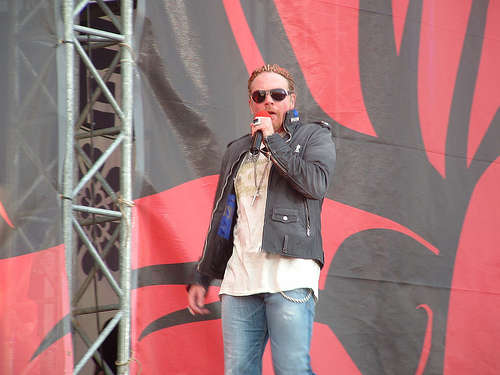
Vocalist Axl Rose was the main creative force behind the album.

In September 1991, Guns N' Roses released the albums Use Your Illusion I and II, selling a combined 35 million copies. That November, rhythm guitarist Izzy Stradlin left the band, citing exhaustion with the current tour and conflicts with bandmates. He was replaced by Gilby Clarke. In 1993, they released "The Spaghetti Incident?", an album of glam and punk rock cover songs. Though certified platinum in 1994, it sold far less than their previous releases, and the band did not tour to support it.

In 1994, the band began writing new material, but bassist Duff McKagan said "nothing got finished" due to drug use. Lead guitarist Slash accused Rose of running the band "like a dictatorship", while Rose claimed collaboration was impossible, leading to the material being scrapped.

In 1994, Rose replaced Clarke with his childhood friend Paul "Huge" Tobias, without consulting the band. He became "obsessed" with electronica and industrial rock, particularly Nine Inch Nails, and pushed for a more modern sound. Other members opposed Tobias and the stylistic shift, deepening tensions.

In early 1995, Ozzy Osbourne guitarist Zakk Wylde auditioned as second guitarist. That August, Rose legally left the band and formed a new partnership under the Guns N' Roses name, and reportedly purchased the full rights to in 1997. Slash departed in 1996, citing creative differences with Rose and issues with Tobias. McKagan described the sessions as indulgent and chaotic: "Axl brought [Tobias] in and said, 'This is our new guitar player' ... There was no democracy... Slash started going, 'Fuck this. What, this is his band now?'. I'd show up at 10, and Axl would arrive at four or five in the morning."

In January 1997, Slash was replaced by ex-Nine Inch Nails guitarist Robin Finck. The following month, electronic musician Moby briefly worked with the band, praising their use of loops but conflicting with Rose over recording vocals. He pulled out to focus on his solo work, later admitting he was not suited to produce a rock band. Mike Clink, who had produced all previous Guns N' Roses albums, was considered as producer, as were Scott Litt (R.E.M., Nirvana), Steve Lillywhite (Dave Matthews Band, U2), and Mark Bell (Björk, Depeche Mode). Producer Tim Palmer (Tears for Fears, Pearl Jam) worked on the album for a few days during its early gestation.

In April 1997, drummer Matt Sorum was fired after arguing with Rose over Tobias. Sorum later said, "I'm so glad I left because it was just stagnant. It didn't make any sense to be ... not being able to put any of your creative energy out to the world. All my stuff was on some tapes on a shelf and four years had gone by." That same month NBA player and rapper Shaquille O'Neal briefly jammed with Reed, Tobias and studio drummer Sidd Riggs, though Rose dismissed it as a casual encounter. Nine Inch Nails drummer Chris Vrenna auditioned, joining a tentative lineup of Rose, McKagan, Tobias, Finck, Vrenna and keyboardist Dizzy Reed. Vrenna recalled, "When I was there, Moby was going to produce. Axl didn't come in very often." Vrenna left and multiple drummers auditioned, including Riggs, Dave Abbruzzese (Pearl Jam), Michael Bland (Prince), Joey Castillo (Danzig), and Kellii Scott (Failure), before Josh Freese (The Vandals, Devo) was hired mid-1997. Freese joined after Rose invited him to help write songs, rare for a drummer in his experience.

McKagan left in August 1997, frustrated by the band's lack of progress and erratic studio habits. Chris Pitman (Tool, Lusk) joined as a second keyboardist and multi-instrumentalist/producer in early 1998. On Freese's recommendation, bassist Tommy Stinson (The Replacements) was hired. By early 1998, the lineup included Rose, Stinson, Freese, Finck, Tobias, Reed and Pitman.

== Recording and production ==
=== Early sessions with producer Youth ===
In February 1998, manager Doug Goldstein said the band was "three to five months away from actually recording," but a release should not be expected until 1999.

That year, Guns N' Roses began recording at Rumbo Recorders, where parts of Appetite for Destruction (1987) had been tracked. Geffen paid Rose $1 million to finish the album, with another $1 million promised if he delivered by March 1, 1999. A&R executive James Barber was brought in to assist: "No expense was spared; they were the biggest band in the history of the label... We desperately wanted the new album for Christmas 1998 and I had a year to get it finished." Barber described the music as "pretty incredible... like GNR, but with Led Zeppelin, Nine Inch Nails and Pink Floyd mixed in. If Axl had recorded vocals, it would have been an absolutely contemporary record in 1999."

In mid-1998, producer Youth (U2, the Verve) joined to help Rose focus. Youth said, "I went to his house and we started writing songs, strumming guitars in the kitchen. That was a major breakthrough because it got him singing again which he hadn't done for a long time.... He hadn't been singing for around 18 months. I think the record had turned into a real labour. He was stuck and didn't know how to proceed, so he was avoiding it. He had some brilliant ideas, but they really were just sketches. He really wanted to leave the past behind and make a hugely ambitious album." Youth later said Rose was withdrawn and not ready to record: "He kind of pulled out... There weren't very many people I think he could trust." Frustrated, Youth left. Engineer Dave Dominguez said Youth was fired after Rose found out about a $1,000,000 bonus he would receive if he got the album out by certain deadlines. Rose later said he had stopped writing in the mid-1990s because of criticism from bandmates and his ex-fiancée Stephanie Seymour.

Rose did not attend sessions regularly. Dominguez said, "He'd be 'on' for a couple of weeks and then 'off' for a couple weeks. He called in pretty much every day, though." Rose rarely sang, occasionally played instruments, and often spent nights discussing non-musical topics. He instructed engineers to keep recording ideas in his absence and was sent multiple CDs and DATs weekly. Over time, he accumulated more than 1000 discs.

Goldstein said the band had "more than 300 hours" of material: "They each take a CD home, listen for cool parts, pick them out, and that's how they build songs." Dominguez explained:

Some parts were three seconds, some three minutes. Everything had an ID and a number, then the CDs were made for each member. They could go, 'OK, on set four, CD three, idea 15, let's do something with that.' Then everybody would take their CD home, get the part and write something to that. It was intense.

=== Work with producer Sean Beavan ===
The band worked with producer Sean Beavan (Nine Inch Nails, Marilyn Manson) from late 1998 to early 2000. Engineer Dave Dominguez left a few days after Beavan brought in his own engineer Jeff "Critter" Newell. Doug Goldstein claimed Beavan was the only main producer up to that point, saying the others were just "people we met with or tried out on some tracks [with]." Beavan said he bonded with Rose instantly: "I went in and had a meeting with Axl. We just sat in the studio together and just talked music really. We just hit it off. It was one of those things where you realize someone is kind of like your brother."

Stinson said "most of the songs on the album started and ended with what [Beavan] did." Beavan recorded Rose's vocals in under a week, most of which are the takes appearing on the final release. He claimed to have worked on 35 songs. Billy Howerdel, hired as a Pro Tools engineer, said, "I came in making sounds for Robin Finck, and that turned into this two-and-a-half-year gig." At one point, Rose paused work to have the new lineup rerecord Appetite for Destruction (1987) using modern recording techniques. He said this helped members reach the needed quality and improved the writing process. (Note: Former producer Youth claimed Rose had been wanting to do this when he joined, and the label instructed him to dissuade Rose. The re-recordings of Appetite were never released, except that part of the re-recorded version of "Sweet Child o' Mine" appears during the end credits of Big Daddy later that year.) In 1999, Queen guitarist Brian May recorded guitar for several tracks. (Note: None of May's work was featured on the album and May was not informed his contributions were removed, writing on his website in 2008: "I did put quite a lot of work in, and was proud of it. But I could understand if Axl wants to have an album which reflects the work of the members of the band as it is, right now.") By mid-1999, over 30 songs had been recorded, and the album was tentatively titled 2000 Intentions.

In 1999, Rose said they had enough material for at least two albums, including one more industrial and electronic than Chinese Democracy. Sources said the plan was to release Chinese Democracy, tour for a year or two, then release the second album without returning to the studio.

=== Album title revealed and release of "Oh My God" ===
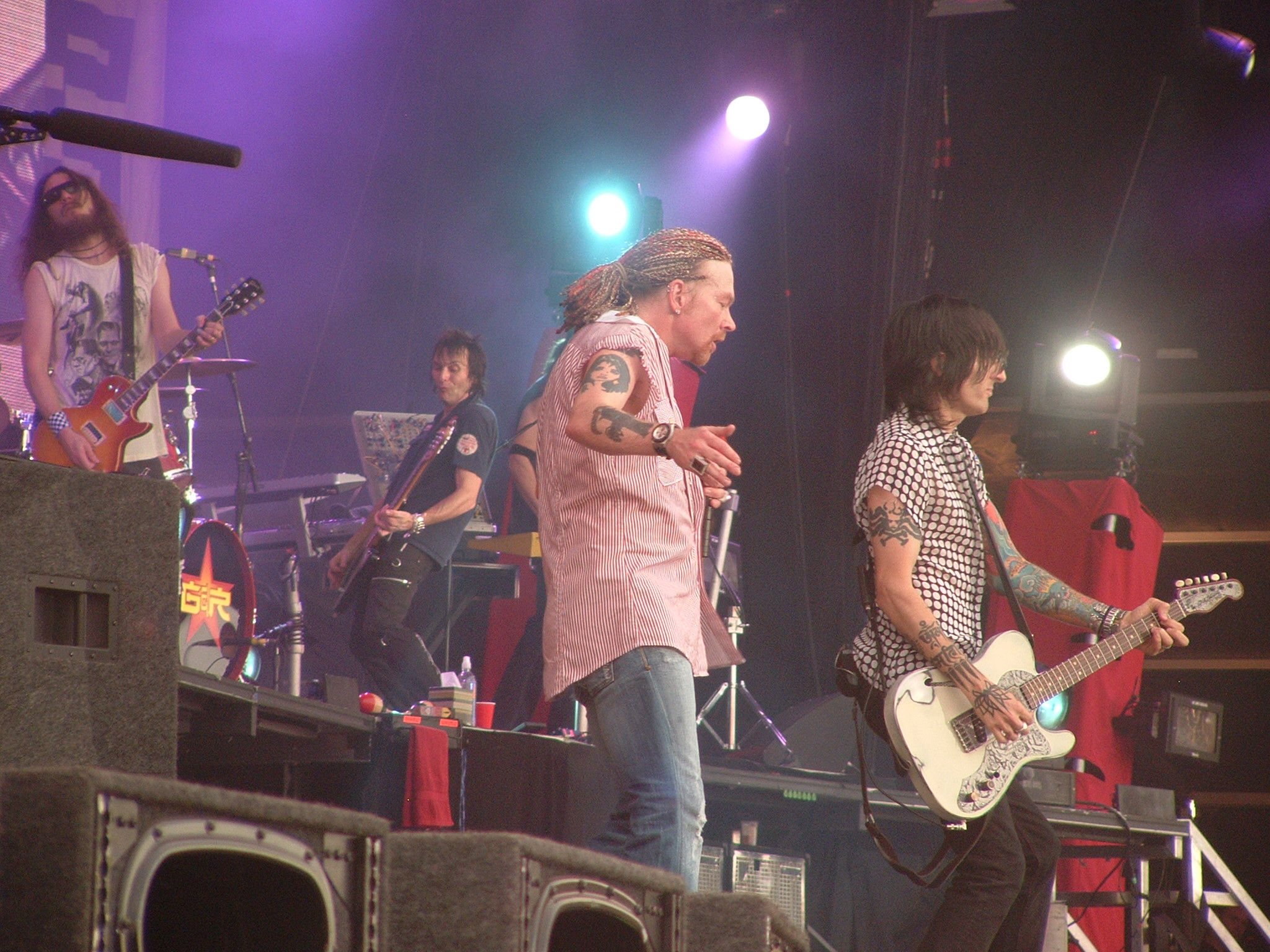
Guns N' Roses at 2006's Download Festival, attending as a part of the Chinese Democracy tour

In a November 1999 interview, Rose announced the title Chinese Democracy, saying: "There's a lot of Chinese democracy movements... It could also just be like an ironic statement. I don't know, I just like the sound of it." He would later state, "The use of the two words "Chinese" and "Democracy" was intentional... I do not purport to know what system of government is best for the people of China. I feel that the prejudice and closed-mindedness of at least many outspoken Guns N' Roses fans seems to warrant an awareness of the realities of a constantly evolving and ever-growing world where China continues to play an ever-increasing role." He described the album as a "melting pot" of varied sounds, including heavy and aggressive tracks. Later that month, he previewed songs for Rolling Stone, who likened the sound to "Physical Graffiti remixed by Beck and Trent Reznor." In 1997–98, sources described the album as electronic influenced. Chris Vrenna said that Rose aimed for a sound like U2 and Brian Eno's Original Soundtracks 1. Though often labeled industrial rock, Rose clarified: "It is not industrial ... There will be all kinds of styles, many influences as blues, mixed in the songs."

That same month, Guns N' Roses released "Oh My God", their first new track in five years and first original in eight, featured in End of Days. The lineup included Rose, Tobias, Stinson, Reed, Pitman, Finck, and Freese, plus guest guitarists Dave Navarro (Jane's Addiction) and Gary Sunshine (Circus of Power). Navarro, briefly recruited in 1991 to replace Stradlin, recalled: "Axl called... I showed up with my gear ... there were 10 people in the studio, and I was like, 'Where's Axl?' And they were like, 'He's coming. But let's get started anyway'... I recorded a couple of passes... and then I hear, 'Yeah, that sounds really good. Why don't you keep that one?' What it was was Axl on speakerphone from his home. Very strange – but I love that it was strange."

"Oh My God" received mixed reviews; AllMusic called it "a less than satisfying comeback", while Rolling Stone saw it as a stopgap to appease fans and offset costs. Beavan said Jimmy Iovine chose the track for the film after hearing several demos. Rose, Iovine, and technicians stayed up all night finalizing the mix. Rose later called it an unfinished demo due to its rushed release.

=== Lineup changes and work with Roy Thomas Baker ===
While finishing "Oh My God", Finck left to rejoin Nine Inch Nails. In January 2000, manager Doug Goldstein said Chinese Democracy was "99% done" and expected mid-year. In a February Rolling Stone interview, Rose said delays were partly due to learning new recording tech: "It's like from scratch... not wanting it just to be something you did on a computer." Around this time, the band moved to Village Recorders.

In March 2000, Rose hired virtuoso guitarist Buckethead (Praxis, Deli Creeps) to replace Finck. His eccentric stage persona – a white mask and a KFC bucket on his head – led to rumors he was Slash in disguise. Josh Freese said of writing songs at the time, "I wrote three or four songs... There would be an A-list and a B-list of tracks on the old dry-erase board... Forever, I had three or four songs on the A-list... but they all had working titles, because they were just instrumentals at the time." Freese left after his contract ended to join A Perfect Circle, formed by Billy Howerdel, who had exited the project months earlier. Freese, frustrated by the lack of touring, likened the band to "a giant jumbo jet sat on the tarmac." On Buckethead's recommendation, Brain (Tom Waits, Primus) was hired as drummer.

Producer Sean Beavan left in early 2000. Though the album was nearly complete, Rose brought in producer Roy Thomas Baker (Queen, The Cars), who convinced him to rerecord the entire album. (Note: Dizzy Reed later disputed the claim that Baker solely convinced Rose to rerecord the album.) Baker felt Freese's drums sounded too "industrial"; Brain said they sounded digital and lacked "air movement". Rose wanted the final album to reflect the energy of those involved, prompting the change. Geffen's Tom Zutaut called Freese's drumming "spectacular" and said: "I would not have wanted to be in Brain's shoes. 'We have got a brilliant performance of this and now we need you to recreate it'." Freese stated in a 2025 interview, "I think that Axl was wanting Brain to feel a part of the project... So when he came in, Axl's like, 'You know, hey, let's redo the drums'."

Rose had Brain learn Freese's parts note-for-note, using transcriptions and a teleprompter before reinterpreting them. Brain said he recorded over eight months, and the final album blended both drummers' styles. Bassist Tommy Stinson rerecorded his parts with each drummer change: "I probably ended up completely re-recording each part five or six times." He later criticized Baker for "wast[ing] many years and many millions of dollars" chasing sounds that could have been fixed in mixing.

After Nine Inch Nails' Fragility Tour ended in July 2000, Finck rejoined. Rose had previously threatened to remove his parts after seeing him perform at the 1999 MTV Video Music Awards. Producer Bob Ezrin (Aerosmith, Kiss, Pink Floyd) was brought in as a consultant. When Rose said the album was ready to mix, Ezrin disagreed over the quality of the songs, later describing them "something that [had been] painted over too many times". Rose said the album was partly inspired by his conflicts with former bandmates and ex-fiancée Seymour. He hoped that her son Dylan, whom Rose was close to, would one day hear it: "if he ever wants to know the story, to hear the truth."

=== A&R executive Tom Zutaut's role ===
In February 2001, Geffen head Jimmy Iovine asked former A&R executive Tom Zutaut, who had discovered Guns N' Roses, to help finish Chinese Democracy. After Zutaut and Rose resolved their personal problems, Rose shared his frustrations with recreating the drum sound of Nirvana's Nevermind. Zutaut helped achieve the sound to Rose's satisfaction. Rose had Zutaut vetted by his psychic, then arranged for Geffen to pay him "whatever it takes", though the album missed its deadline.

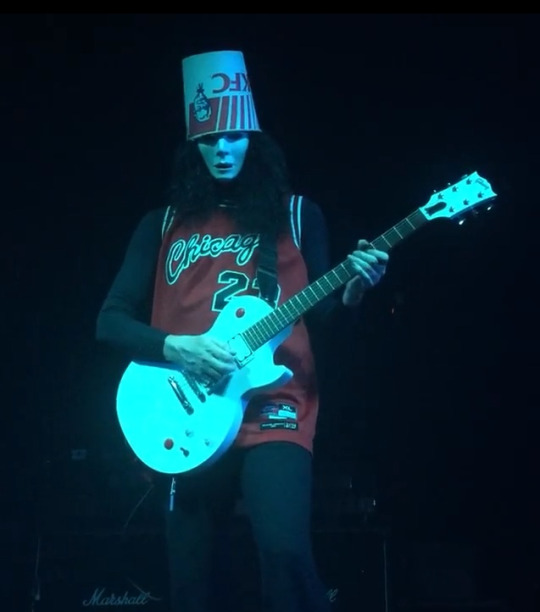
Buckethead in 2016, with his signature white mask and KFC bucket

Zutaut said the band had 50-60 songs in development. Buckethead had quit over conflicts with Baker and the slow progress, but Zutaut coaxed him back by building a chicken coop studio filled with straw, wire, and rubber chickens. Only assistant engineers could enter to adjust mics. Rose's assistant Beta Lebeis called it a cheap joke: "Its just wire ... It's something you do in three or four hours. Just for fun." Zutaut said Buckethead used the coop to watch hardcore pornography, upsetting Rose. After one of Rose's dogs defecated in the coop, Buckethead refused to clean it, saying he liked the smell. Staff removed it after three days, angering him. (Note: In a 2020 interview, Brain denied that Buckethead had acted disruptively.)

At Interscope's request, Zutaut reviewed the budget and found thousands wasted monthly on unused gear. His changes saved an estimated $75,000 per month. Rose's erratic schedule left paid staff idle. Zutaut said: "These fucking people are getting paid shitloads.. sitting on their arse doing nothing because Axl's not coming to the studio."

Zutaut urged Rose to release the album as a solo project, believing it would sell better. Rose disagreed, saying in 2008: "I didn't make a solo record... It would be completely different and probably much more instrumental." Lebeis said 48 songs were completed by March 2001, and Geffen began selecting tracks. Zutaut reviewed all 50-60 songs with Rose to decide which were worth finishing, and said they had completed versions of "The Blues", "Madagascar", "Chinese Democracy" and "Atlas Shrugged".

==== Departure of Zutaut and Baker ====
For Black Hawk Down (2001), director Ridley Scott requested the use of Guns N' Roses' 1987 track "Welcome to the Jungle" from Appetite for Destruction. According to Tom Zutaut, Axl Rose had already rerecorded the full album with new band members, and one of these versions was mixed for the film. Rose later attended a screening arranged by Zutaut, but upon discovering it was not private, Rose fired him; Zutaut claimed he was "set up", a claim Rose denied. By then, Zutaut estimated 11 or 12 tracks were nearly finished, and the album could have been ready by September 2002. Producer Roy Thomas Baker left the project a few months later.

=== Live performances and touring ===
On January 1, 2001, Guns N' Roses played their first concert in over seven years at the House of Blues in Las Vegas. They headlined Rock in Rio III on January 14 to an audience of 190,000 people. On August 29, 2002, they made a surprise appearance at the MTV Video Music Awards performing the new song "Madagascar". The 2002 Chinese Democracy Tour received mixed reviews, and show cancellations in Vancouver and Philadelphia led to riots and the tour's cancellation.

We composed and recorded for several years... Every time we thought we had good songs, someone said that they could still be better.

— Axl Rose, 2001

Rhythm guitarist Paul Tobias left in 2002. Rose called him vital to the writing process but said touring was not his preference. He was replaced by Richard Fortus (The Psychedelic Furs, Love Spit Love), who said most of the material was already written, with some riffs dating back to Slash. The band had considered Marc Ford of The Black Crowes, but he declined. Fortus called recording "challenging" since every guitar part had to be structured with three guitar players. In August 2002, Rose wrote that the album was nearly complete, with a finalized tracklist and artwork. Weeks later he told MTV: "You'll see [the album], but I don't know if 'soon' is the word." In November, Reed said the album would be out by June 2003, with only minor work left. Rose confirmed plans for multiple albums and blamed delays on lack of label support, saying he had taken on roles beyond his scope. He also cited pressure during the Illusion sessions as a reason for the prolonged process.

Composers Marco Beltrami and Paul Buckmaster contributed orchestral arrangements for several songs in late 2002. In 2003, Beltrami said: "Axl played me these songs, asked me my ideas... I wrote some melodies and stuff. The music was eclectic, and there were no lyrics on the songs that I was working on." Buckmaster said: "Axl was supposed to be there at 3pm, but turned up at 5. He was apologetic and ran me through four songs that he wanted to put strings over."

In 2003, Eddie Trunk described the song "I.R.S." as Illusion-era hard rock with modern touches. Later that year, the Offspring joked their next album would be called Chinese Democracy (You Snooze, You Lose). Rose responded with a cease-and-desist order, which Dexter Holland said was blown out of proportion.

In mid-2003, the band reportedly began rerecording the album again. A journalist said Rose wanted it "as perfect as possible." In 2004, Stinson said it was "almost done", but delays stemmed from legal issues and Rose's desire for full band input: "You have to get eight people to basically write a song together that everyone likes." An engineer said Rose aimed to make "the best record ever," which led to endless revisions. Stinson later said Geffen left Rose to self-produce, which Rose had not wanted. After the label merged with Interscope, Rose was told Jimmy Iovine would be more involved.

=== Label disputes and funding issues ===
By 2004, Geffen removed Chinese Democracy from its release schedule and cut funding, citing overspending: "It is Mr. Rose's obligation to fund and complete the album." Manager Merck Mercuriadis claimed the album was nearly finished. A 2005 New York Times article estimated production costs at $13 million (equivalent to $21,430,397 today), dubbing it "the most expensive recording 'never' made." (Note: Michael Jackson's Invincible (2001) reportedly had a larger budget of $30 million, although the majority of that was marketing costs.) Mercuriadis dismissed the report, saying most sources had not been involved in years and had not heard the album. At one point, the band's monthly budget reached $250,000. Rose said the cost would be offset by material for multiple albums.

The making of this album has been an unbearably long and incomprehensible journey.. a bad dream in which one wakes up only to find they are still in the nightmare.

— Axl Rose

==== Buckethead's departure and Greatest Hits ====
On March 17, 2004, Buckethead quit Guns N' Roses, prompting cancellation of their planned tour, including a headlining slot at Rock in Rio Lisboa I. His management cited frustration with the band's inability to finish an album or tour. The band responded, calling Buckethead "inconsistent and erratic," with a "transient lifestyle" that made communication difficult. Rose, who had taken over as main producer around this time, stated they hoped to announce a release date "within the next few months," (Note: Rose later said "I have no issues with Bucket. It's hard to tell what was real or not in things we were told by [former manager] Merck.") with Stinson saying it would reach mastering by November.

Later that week, Geffen released Guns N' Roses' Greatest Hits, citing Rose's failure to deliver the new album. (Note: The label compiled the album without any input from current or former members of the band; Rose was joined by former bandmates Slash and Duff McKagan in unsuccessfully suing the label to prevent its release.)

=== Tour resumption and lineup changes ===
Buckethead was replaced by Ron "Bumblefoot" Thal, and touring resumed in May 2006. Bumblefoot said the album was "pretty far along", with most material written and recorded, though more guitar work was needed. He added parts between tour legs, writing for every song, experimenting with fretless guitar and trying hundreds of ideas. He described the dense arrangements as challenging: "You go high - there's a synth. You go low- it's buried in bass." He spent long days crafting original parts: "[I] would experiment with different ideas and directions – fretless, fretted, wah, clean, heavy, bluesy, melody, rhythmic, technical. 100 tracks for a song, with two people yelling opposite directions in my ear at the same time. In the end, Caram and Axl chose what worked." Bumblefoot said he and producer Caram Costanzo (an engineer who joined in 2000 before becoming the co-producer alongside Rose in 2003) worked 14-hour days on the album.

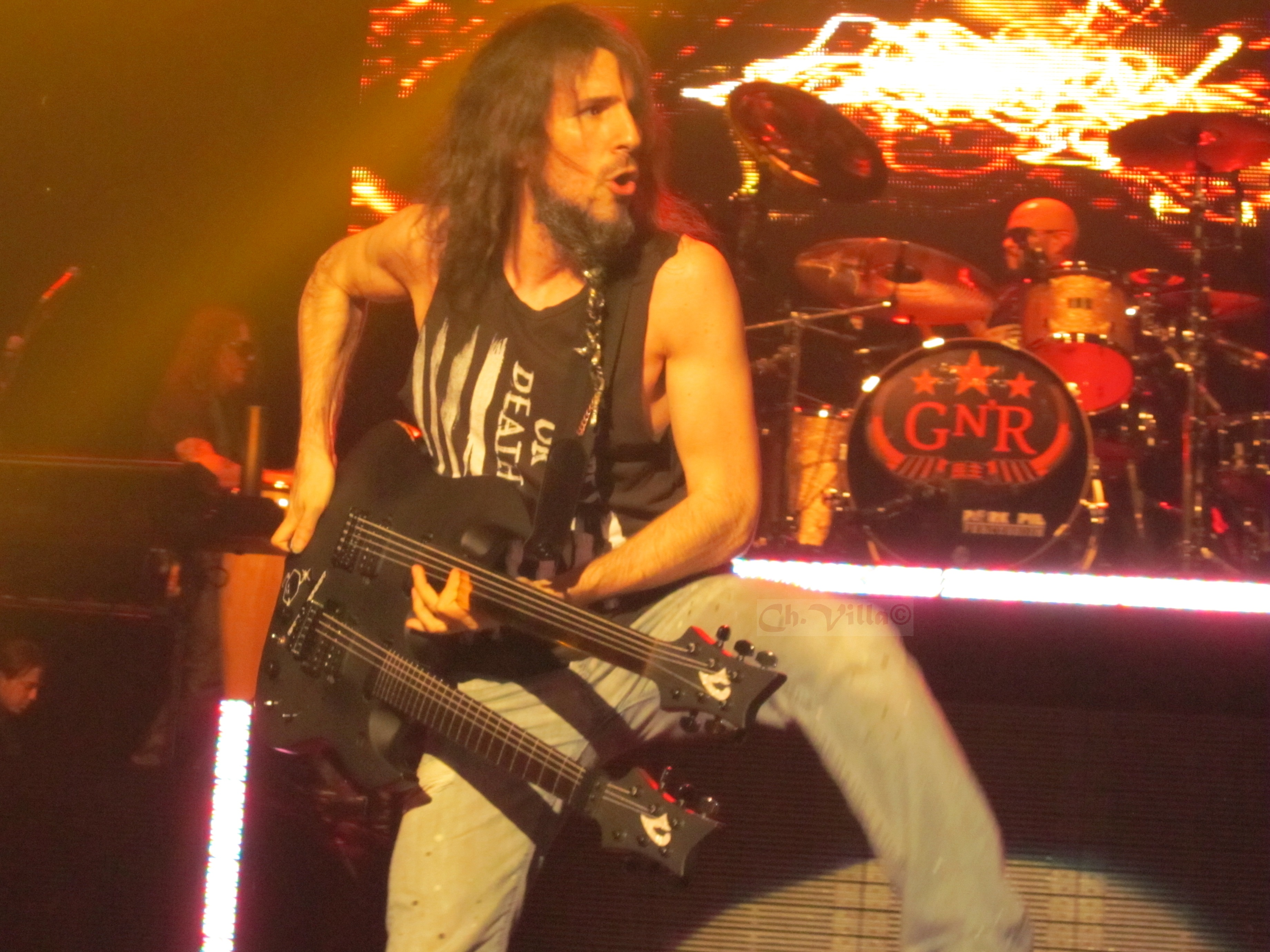
Guitarist Ron "Bumblefoot" Thal and drummer Frank Ferrer joined the band in 2006.

Drummer Brain left in July 2006 to parent his newborn daughter. Frank Ferrer (The Beautiful, The Psychedelic Furs) replaced him and added new drum tracks. Ferrer said Brain encouraged him to make the songs his own, focusing on feel over precision. He plays on five tracks, including the title song, while the rest feature drums by Brain and Ferrer using Freese's arrangements.

In October 2006, Rolling Stone reported a "firm" release date of November 21. Engineer Andy Wallace, known for his work with Nirvana and Slayer, was mixing the album. Stinson said that most of it had been recorded collaboratively in 2001, and had been "pretty much done" since then. Reed attributed the delays to a lack of deadlines or pressure.

On December 14, Rose announced four show cancellations to focus on finishing the album. He also ended the band's relationship with manager Mercuriadis and gave a tentative release date of March 6, 2007, the first time the band had publicly given a date. At a Korn tour launch party, Rose called the album "complex", with Queen-like arrangements, and expected mixed reactions from fans. Sebastian Bach described it as "epic," "badass" and "grand," combining the rawness of Appetite for Destruction with the grandiosity of "November Rain".

Rose said in 2006 that 32 songs were in development, and Bach later confirmed Chinese Democracy was intended as the first in a trilogy. In 2008, Rose revealed working titles for 10 songs from the planned follow-up albums (see § Unused tracks and follow-up album).

=== Final sessions ===
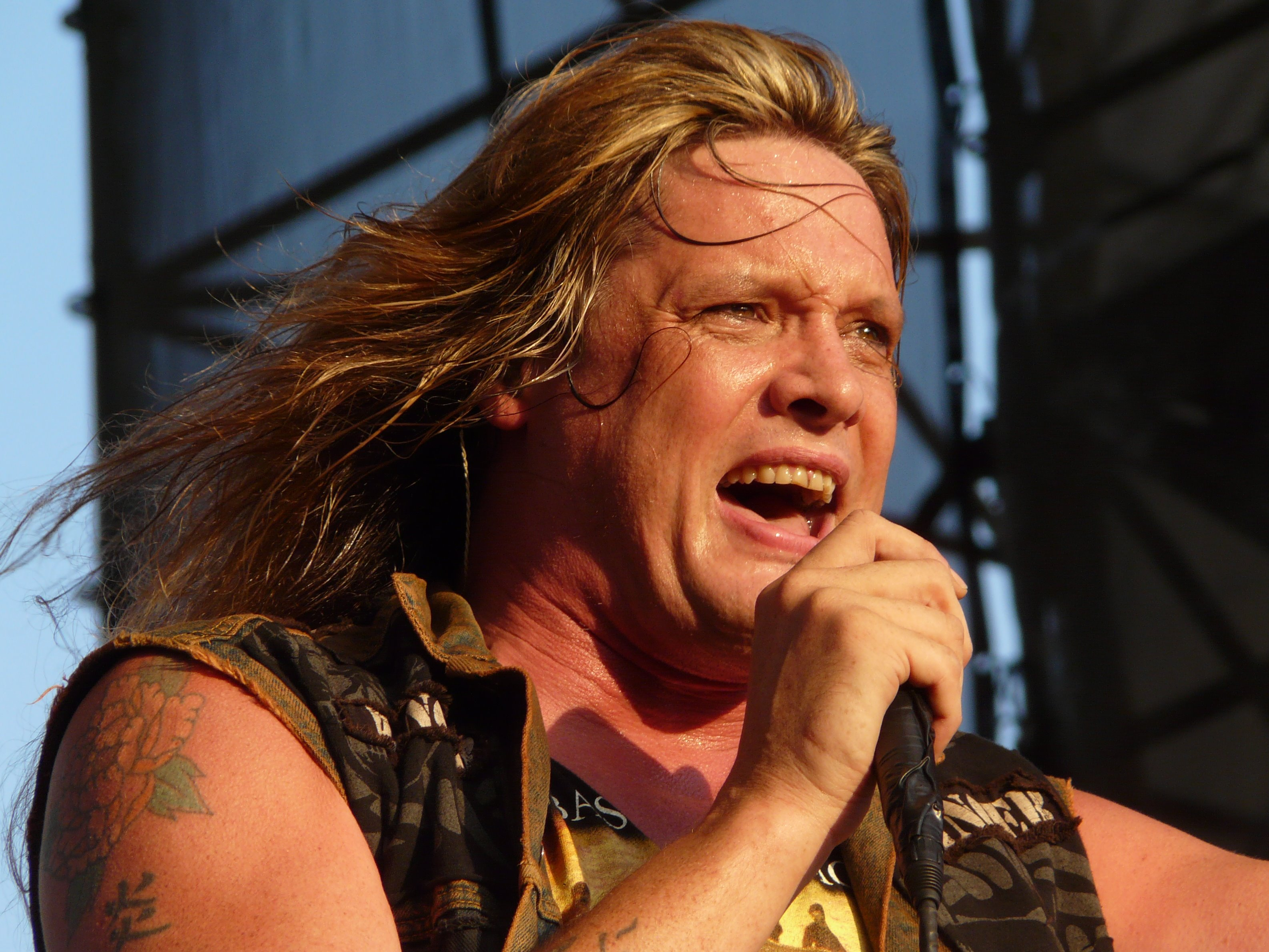
Former Skid Row vocalist Sebastian Bach recorded vocals on the song "Sorry".

Rose recorded his final vocal tracks in January 2007. On February 22, road manager Del James confirmed that recording was complete and mixing had begun, though no release date was set. Sebastian Bach said Rose had hoped for a Christmas 2007 release, but delays may have stemmed from business issues. Bach also recorded backing vocals for "Sorry" at Electric Lady Studios, describing it as "almost like doom metal with Axl singing really clean over this grinding, slow beat". Harpist Patti Hood and conductor Suzy Katayama contributed additional parts.

In January 2008, rumors suggested that the album had been delivered to Geffen but was delayed due to marketing disagreements. Eddie Trunk claimed financial issues were to blame, but Rose's manager Beta Lebeis denied this, stating negotiations were ongoing. Rose retained full control over track selection and sequencing. Tommy Stinson later said Jimmy Iovine "pulled the record out of Axl's hand at the fucking 11:30th hour," just before Rose was ready to sign off.

The final credits list Rose and Caram Costanzo as the main producers, with Eric Caudieux, Chris Pitman, Roy Thomas Baker and Sean Beavan providing additional production. Recording spanned 14 studios, including Capitol, Cherokee, Electric Lady, Sunset Sound, and The Village. Mastering engineer Bob Ludwig submitted three versions of the album. Rose and Costanzo chose the one without dynamic range compression, rejecting the loudness war trend. Ludwig praised the decision: "I was floored... The fan and press backlash against the recent heavily compressed recordings finally set the context for someone to take a stand."

== Release and promotion ==
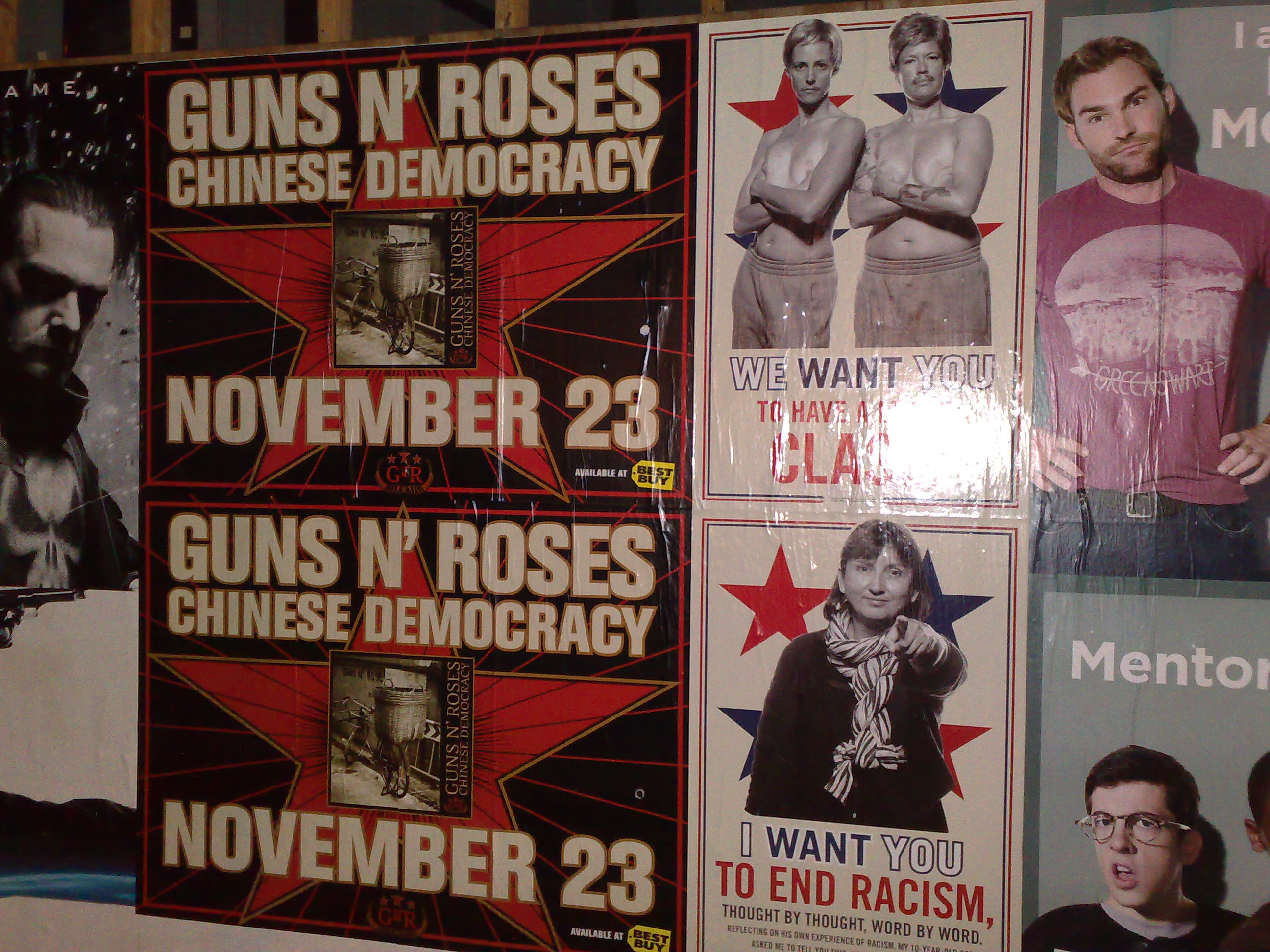
Street advertisement, 2008

In July 2002, Rose played several songs from the album at a Las Vegas strip club to gauge the crowd's reaction. In October 2006, Rose previewed ten songs at listening parties in New York bars.

On September 14, 2008, "Shackler's Revenge" debuted in Rock Band 2, marking the first official release of new Guns N' Roses material since 1999's "Oh My God". (Note: The entire album was made available for the game on April 14, 2009, as downloadable content.) It was followed by "If the World", featured in the closing credits of Body of Lies.

On October 9, Billboard confirmed a November 23, 2008 release date for Chinese Democracy, sold exclusively through Best Buy in the U.S. Label head Jimmy Iovine stated of the deal, "...the labels [need] marketing partners to drive this music, whether it's a song, an album or a new configuration. In this case, Best Buy gave this album a great deal of marketing that we couldn't have gotten any other way". The title track premiered on October 22 via the Kevin & Bean show on KROQ-FM. Promotional ads referencing the 2008 United States presidential election aired in early November. "Better" was released as a promo single on November 17, followed by "Street of Dreams" in March 2009.

It's the right record and I couldn't ask for more. Could have been a more enjoyable journey, but it's there now. The art comes first.

— Axl Rose

Days before release, the album was streamed on Myspace, surpassing 3 million plays and setting a platform record. Managers Irving Azoff and Andy Gould called the launch "a historic moment in rock 'n' roll backed by a monumental campaign." The title track was also used as the theme song for WWE's Armageddon in December 2008. A music video for "Better", directed by Dale "Rage" Resteghini, was announced in December 2009; however, it never released. Iovine said on release, "Axl delivered a great Guns N' Roses album. Period. He did. It took him a long time for whatever reasons... It's hard to say if something is worth the wait, because how the hell do any of us know? I judge it based on what it is. Does it sound better than 99% of the rock records out there? Yes. I'm just thrilled for him".

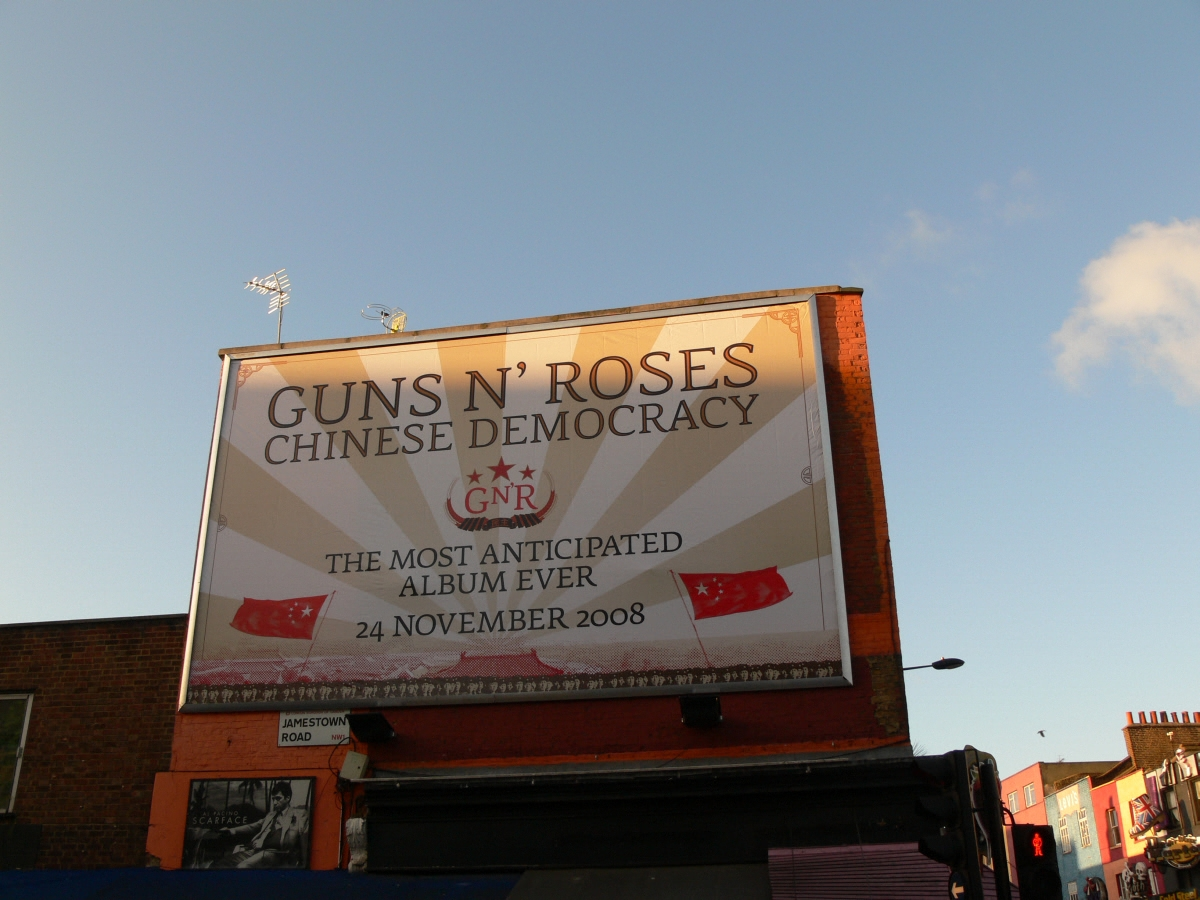
A billboard for the album in London.

In March 2009, the band announced a new leg of the Chinese Democracy Tour, which ran from December 2009 to December 2012. Robin Finck departed to rejoin Nine Inch Nails before the tour and was replaced by DJ Ashba. A guitar tab book was released in December 2009.

The album was banned in China due to perceived criticism of the Chinese government and references to Falun Gong. State media claimed it "turns its spear point on China."

=== Disputes with label and management ===
After the album's release, Rose remained out of public view for several months and ignored Geffen's requests to promote it. On December 12, he posted statements on fan forums addressing the album, former bandmates, and tour plans. In a February 9, 2009 interview, Rose said he saw "no real involvement or effort from Interscope." In a 2018 retrospective, Billboard criticized the marketing, calling it "a colossal blunder" that undermined the "most anticipated rock album in history."

In May 2010, Front Line Management sued Rose over unpaid concert fees. Rose countersued for $5 million, alleging sabotage of the album's release, including "purposefully spoiling" the artwork, "botching" a deal with Best Buy and leaking tracks. In a 2024 interview, drummer Dave Abbruzzese claimed executives wanted the album to fail to pressure Rose into reuniting with Slash. (Note: In a 2016 interview, former manager Irving Azoff denied he pressured Rose to reunite the old band.) The lawsuit was settled in 2011.

=== Leaked tracks and legal fallout ===
In 2003, DJ Eddie Trunk played a leaked demo of "I.R.S.", from New York Mets catcher Mike Piazza.

Between 2006 and 2008, numerous tracks from Chinese Democracy leaked online. Early leaks include "I.R.S.", "The Blues", "There Was a Time", "Better" and "Catcher in the Rye". "I.R.S." received enough radio play to chart at #49 on the Active Rock National Airplay Chart before management intervened. Later leaks came from unexpected sources: Harley-Davidson accidentally released "Better" in an ad, while professional wrestler Mister Saint Laurent leaked updated versions of several tracks in 2007. By the album's release, only three of its 14 songs had not been leaked or performed live.

In June 2008, blogger Kevin Cogill streamed nine tracks on Antiquiet, crashing the site due to traffic. He was arrested in August under the Family Entertainment and Copyright Act. Slash said: "I hope he rots in jail. It's going to affect the sales of the record." Techdirt reported that the arrest spiked illegal downloads, and that UMG showed search engine traffic results to Best Buy to support a distribution deal.

Cogill pleaded guilty in November to one count of copyright infringement, later reduced to a misdemeanor. He claimed the government could not prove the album was commercially imminent: "No one at the RIAA or the label had informed the government that these songs had been lying around for 14 years. Only that they had cost $12 million." He was sentenced to two months' house arrest and was ordered to produce an anti-piracy video, which was never made due to RIAA budget concerns.

In 2019, 97 demos leaked online after Tom Zutaut's abandoned storage unit was auctioned off. The "Locker Leaks" contained 19 discs of mostly instrumental recordings from around 2001–2002.

=== Dr Pepper promotion ===
On March 26, 2008, media reported that Dr Pepper would offer a free can to every American — excluding Buckethead and Slash — if Chinese Democracy was released that year. Rose responded on the band's website, expressing surprise and saying he would share his Dr Pepper with Buckethead.

After the release was confirmed, Dr Pepper upheld its pledge, but its website crashed under demand for coupons. Two days later, Rose's lawyer Alan Gutman threatened legal action, calling the promotion "an unmitigated disaster" that "defrauded consumers" and "ruined" the album's release. He demanded full-page apologies in major newspapers. Rose later said he considered the issue minor and was surprised by the legal response, believing focus should have remained on the album.

=== Copyright infringement ===
In October 2009, Ulrich Schnauss's labels Independiente and Domino sued Guns N' Roses, alleging unauthorized sampling of Schnauss's tracks "Wherever You Are" (2001) and "A Strangely Isolated Place" (2003) in "Riad N' the Bedouins". Attorney Brian Caplan said they first contacted Geffen in February, but the label "attempted to explain [the samples] away."

Guns N' Roses denied wrongdoing. Manager Irving Azoff stated the ambient snippets were supplied by a producer who claimed they were legally obtained. He added the band resented the implication of misuse and was considering counterclaims, but expected a resolution. The labels sought $1 million in damages from Geffen.

=== Unused tracks and follow-up album ===
Tommy Stinson said the album was originally intended as a multi-disc release, but after years of work, they had to wrap it up. He added that material from the previous lineup remained unreleased. According to Bumblefoot, "Atlas Shrugged" was cut due to CD length limits. Other unreleased tracks include "Oklahoma", "Thyme", "The General", "Elvis Presley and the Monster of Soul", "Leave Me Alone", "Ides of March", "Silkworms", "Down by the Ocean", "Zodiac", "Quick Song" and "We Were Lying".

In August 2013, "Going Down", featuring Stinson on vocals, leaked online, along with remixes by Brain and future Guns N' Roses keyboardist Melissa Reese. In 2014, Rose said a second part of Chinese Democracy and a remix album were complete and awaiting release. Billboard reported in 2018 that a follow-up had been planned for 2016, but was shelved when Slash and Duff McKagan rejoined. Richard Fortus confirmed work on a new album that year, and in 2021, Slash said the band was reworking Chinese Democracy-era songs. That year, starting with "Absurd", the band began releasing reworked singles.

== Musical style and composition ==
"Chinese Democracy"
Sample of "Chinese Democracy" from Chinese Democracy. It was the first single released by Guns N' Roses since 1994. The song represented a shift in style for the band towards industrial rock.

Chinese Democracy marked Guns N' Roses' expansion into industrial rock, electronic rock, nu metal, and trip-hop while retaining their hard rock roots. Critics noted similarities to Queen, Paul McCartney and Wings, and Andrew Lloyd Webber.

=== Tracks 1–7 ===
"Chinese Democracy" was inspired by the film Kundun and Rose's three-month stay in China. Lyrics referencing Falun Gong contributed to the album being banned in China. The track opens with a delayed intro of ambient noise and guitar lines, with Spin comparing the guitars to Tom Morello. Josh Freese wrote the main riff, describing it as "really dumb, simple, dirty." Rose cited Dave Grohl's drumming on "Smells Like Teen Spirit" as an influence. Guitarist Bumblefoot contributed fretless rhythm guitar, and the solos are by Robin Finck and Buckethead. Bassist Tommy Stinson described it as one of his favorites, saying it's "kind of a double barn burner, real fucking in your face, you know."

"Shackler's Revenge" was inspired by school shootings and media sensationalism, (Note: Virginia Tech shooter Seung-Hui Cho once wrote a play based on the lyrics of the Guns N' Roses song "Mr. Brownstone", although "Shackler's Revenge" was written & recorded before the shooting.) and Rose likened its lyrics to a horror film. Critics compared the track to Nine Inch Nails, The Prodigy, Marilyn Manson, Korn, and Rob Zombie. The song blends industrial, electronic, nu metal, sludge rock, and alternative rock. Rolling Stone described its layered vocals as "a demented choir". According to Brain, the track originated from jams he and Buckethead had worked on since the Praxis era, which were later developed at Rose's request. Bumblefoot wrote the guitar solos and many rhythm parts, noting that Buckethead had written much of the original material and that he was "putting icing on a cake that already existed."

"Better" is an electronic rock track with falsetto vocals and a "whining guitar line". Critics highlighted its blend of electronic beats, layered guitars, and hip‑hop‑influenced production, with Loudwire noting an acid house‑style rhythm, while Rolling Stone described the intro as a "hip-hop voicemail". Apple Music likened Rose's vocal approach to Bruce Dickinson. Rose praised the guitar work in the bridge as among his favorites from the album.

"Street of Dreams" is a piano-driven ballad reminiscent of "November Rain" and "The Garden", with Elton John and Queen influences. It was described by critics as one of the album's most traditional Guns N' Roses-style tracks, noted for its dramatic piano, orchestral arrangements, and emotional vocal delivery.

On "If The World", Buckethead plays a flamenco guitar, described as having "an electronic funk slither", with neo-soul, nu-metal, and trip-hop elements. Pitman said the song was "about environmental decay in its futurist context"; he wrote the song on a 12-string guitar, then layered dub beats, strings and synths. Rose said it parodies James Bond music and Blaxploitation soundtracks.

"There Was a Time" is an orchestral and synth-heavy track, with Mellotron, choirs, and violins. Spin noted, "Bluesy piano and slyly cinematic passage set up the highest notes Axl's full-health throat has ever belted." Apple Music said it features "prog rock mellotron and strings", while Ultimate Classic Rock noted its blend of hip-hop beats, guitar solos and "tortured vocals". Kerrang cited influences from Danny Elfman, The Eagles, and Santana.

"Catcher in the Rye" was written after Rose watched a documentary on Mark David Chapman, intended as a tribute to John Lennon and a critique of the book. A power ballad, it drew comparisons to Oasis, Elton John, Queen, and "Yesterdays". Stinson said "Axl was inspired by the book. He felt really identified with it. The recording process was very interesting too, we all brought different ideas to it. It's one of my favorite songs on that album." Bumblefoot said the dense arrangement of the song reminds him of the Yes album Going For The One.

=== Tracks 8–14 ===
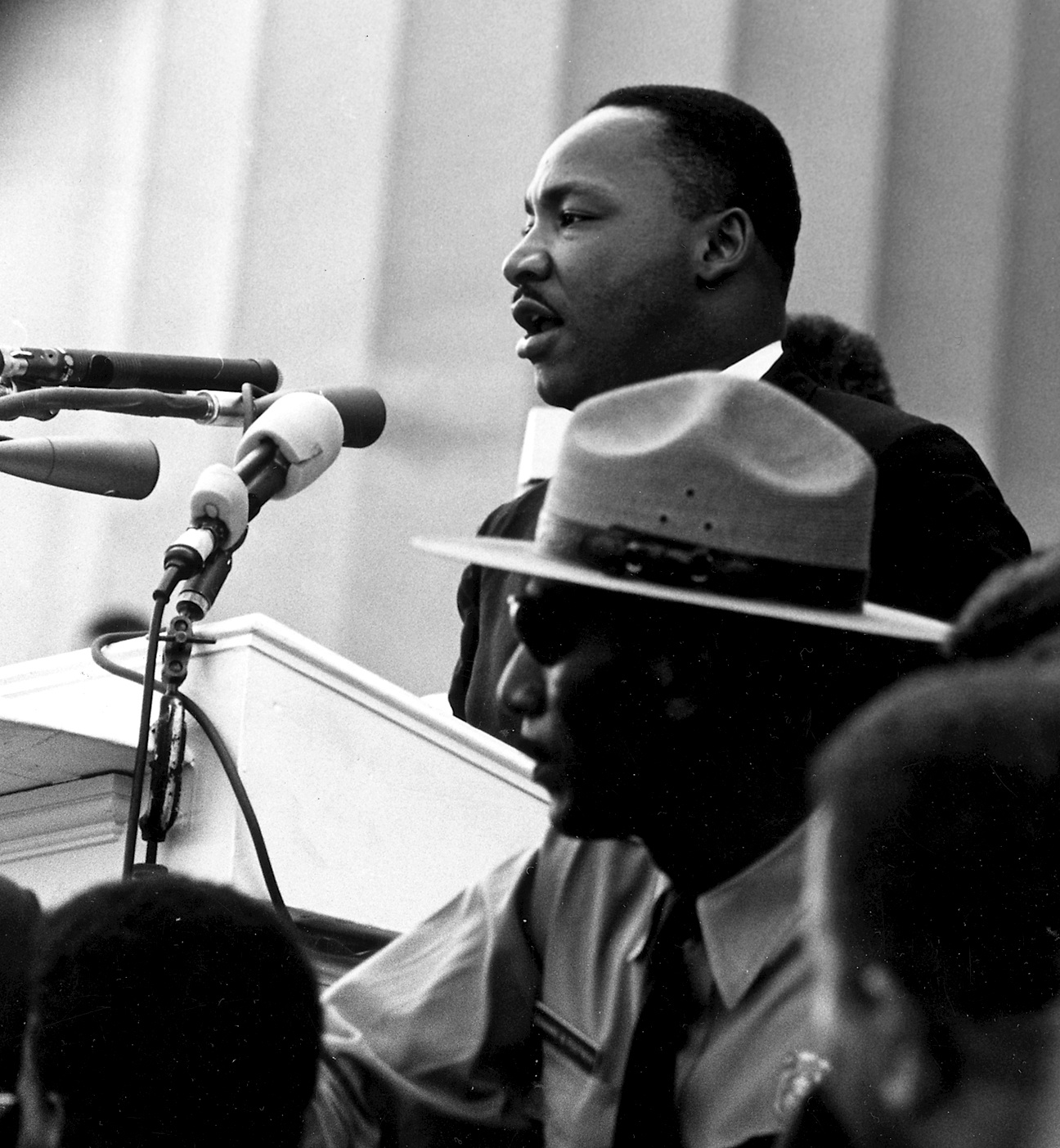
Martin Luther King Jr.'s speeches are sampled on "Madagascar".

"Scraped" marks a return to industrial rock, featuring heavily processed vocals, and lyrics such as "All things are possible, I am unstoppable." The instrumental track was written by guitarist Buckethead. A vocal bridge has been noted for its similarity to "Get the Funk Out" by Extreme, and the song's style has also drawn comparisons to Soundgarden. Loudwire noted the song's "hard-chugging groove has a sense of the band's classic guitar interplay, but is rooted in a then-modern alternative sound."

"Riad N' The Bedouins" was inspired by a man known to Rose as Riad, a former acquaintance of Erin Everly, who claimed to be an international arms dealer and financier and served as the conceptual inspiration for the song's anti-war themes (Riad was also the inspiration for the earlier song "Civil War"). Rose compared parts of the song to The Beatles' "Hey Bulldog." Bassist Tommy Stinson, who wrote the original instrumental, described the riff as "pretty nutty" but "a groove that's really fun to play," and recalled Brian May's bewilderment: "Tommy, what are these fucking jazz chords?" The intro samples "Wherever You Are" and "A Strangely Isolated Place" by Ulrich Schnauss (see § Copyright infringement). Some critics have suggested the song's lyrics reference the Iraq War. Rose's vocals on the track were compared to Robert Plant.

"Sorry" is a power ballad directed at critics and former bandmates, featuring the chorus "I'm sorry for you / Not sorry for me." Rose stated that the song was not about former guitarist Slash, but instead addressed "anyone talking nonsense at mine and the public's expense." The instrumental track was originally composed by guitarist Buckethead and drummer Brain. Critics compared the song's sound to that of Pink Floyd and Metallica, while Rose's vocal performance drew comparisons to Layne Staley. The A.V. Club noted Rose's "bizarre, quasi-Transylvanian accent" on the line "But I don't want to do it," a stylistic choice Rose defended by saying "I like it, feel it absolutely fits the song, is a bit reggae etc and is lots of fun personally."

"I.R.S." features lyrics about calling government agencies over a guitar-heavy track. Critics noted trip-hop influences and similarities to Nirvana's "In Bloom". The song started as a loop in early 1998. Rolling Stone highlighted the line "I bet you think I'm doin' this all for my health" as one of several self‑referential moments on the album, noting it as an acknowledgment of Rose's public image during the album's long gestation.

"Madagascar" is a trip-hop track featuring interwoven samples from the films Mississippi Burning, Casualties of War, Cool Hand Luke, Braveheart, and Seven, as well as excerpts from Martin Luther King Jr.'s speeches "I Have a Dream" and "Why Jesus Called a Man a Fool." Rose explained that King's words were edited together from multiple speeches to contextualize their themes and emphasize their significance within the song. When debuting the song live at Rock in Rio III, Rose stated, "Hopefully it will express my sentiments, and I will dedicate this song to the love that you have shown us." According to keyboardist Chris Pitman, the song's French horn introduction originated during an early home recording session, when a synthesizer patch was switched to a French horn sound and the moment was recorded and retained as the opening. Rose cited Ernest Hemingway's novella The Old Man and the Sea as an influence on his decision to sing the song in a deeper register, while drummer Brain said his performance was influenced by John Bonham. Time compared the song to Led Zeppelin's "Kashmir."

"This I Love" is a piano ballad originally written and recorded in 1992 during the Use Your Illusion Tour in France; which Rose described as "the heaviest thing I've written." He stated that the string melody was originally composed over a hip-hop loop, and later described it as the most emotional song for him to perform, citing the orchestral arrangements as among his proudest achievements on the album. The song was considered for inclusion on the soundtrack to What Dreams May Come (1998) but was ultimately not used. Rose said he initially had no intention of including the song on the album until producer Caram Costanzo and guitarist Robin Finck persuaded him to do so. The song is described as a love song; Rose later recalled that its subject thanked him "for the gift of your soul." Spin compared the song's style to the work of Andrew Lloyd Webber.

"Prostitute" is an orchestral power ballad that features the lyrics "Ask yourself / Why I would choose / To prostitute myself / To live with fortune and shame." Producer Youth said Rose "labored" over it due to pressure from past success. Loudwire noted its blend of "classical orchestrations and electro-beats with blistering guitar solos and some of [Rose's] highest pitched shrieking." Consequence of Sound compared the vocals to "Bruce Hornsby with distortion."

== Artwork ==
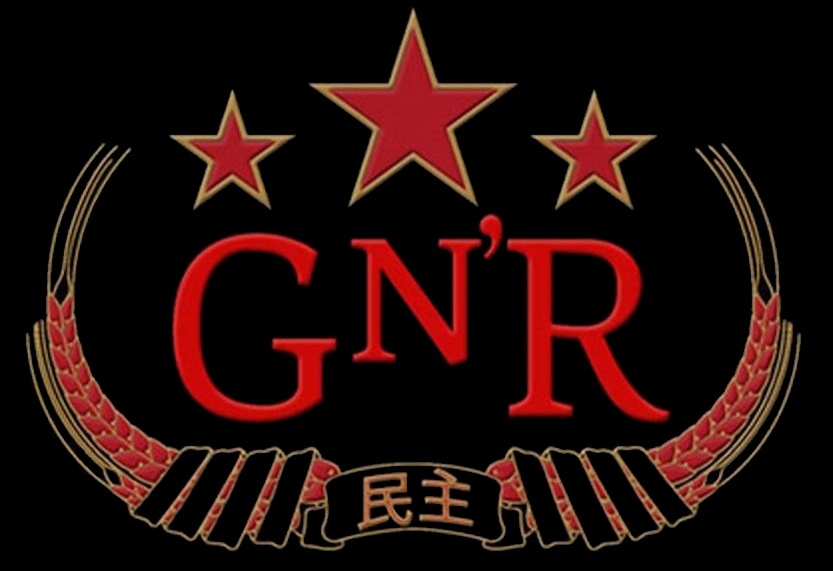
Guns N' Roses' logo featured on the Chinese Democracy cover

The cover features a sepia photo of a bicycle with a wicker basket against a graffitied wall with the band's name, shot in Kowloon Walled City by Terry Hardin. Above the vertically written band name and the album title are three red communist stars and the letters "GNR". Artistic director Ryan Corey said Rose conceived the bike cover early in the album's development.

Rose initially approached Chinese artist Chen Zhuo to use a painting of Tiananmen Square as an amusement park, but Chen declined due to censorship concerns. Instead, Rose selected Shi Lifeng's "Controlling No. 3" for an alternate "art edition" cover. This version was used for the Rock Band 2 download and released in limited CD quantities. The alternate booklet includes Rose's essay "Fear N' Freedom: The Future of China and Western Society". The regular booklet features artwork by Shi, photos of the Hong Kong skyline, the Chinese military, and band members.

In December 2008, Rose said that two alternate booklets were planned but never released, criticizing the use of an "error-filled draft" instead of the final artwork. Only the "art edition" was issued. Stinson later said executives pulled the artwork "right at the last second, when [Rose] wasn't ready."

== Critical reception ==
Professional ratings
Aggregate scores
Source	Rating
AnyDecentMusic?	5.8/10
Metacritic	64/100
Review scores
Source	Rating
AllMusic	4/5 stars
The A.V. Club	A−
Blender	3.5/5 stars
Entertainment Weekly	B−
The Guardian	3/5 stars
MSN Music (Consumer Guide)	B+
Pitchfork	5.8/10
Q	2/5 stars
Rolling Stone	4/5 stars
Spin	7/10

According to the review aggregator Metacritic, Chinese Democracy received "generally favorable reviews" based on a weighted average score of 64 out of 100 from 28 critic scores. Ann Powers (Los Angeles Times) called it "a cyborgian blend of pop expressiveness, traditional rock bravado and Brian Wilson-style beautiful weirdness", describing the songs as "theatrical, with voicings and arrangements often taking precedence over riffs and grooves" and comparing it to a rock opera. Chuck Klosterman (The A.V. Club) praised the vocals and guitar work, saying "three songs are astonishing. Four or five others are very good" and noted the album as "the last Old media album... the last album that will matter more as a physical object than as an Internet sound file." (Note: Klosterman had previously published a fake review of the album in 2006 as part of an April Fools' Day joke.) David Fricke (Rolling Stone) described it as "audacious, unhinged and uncompromising," saying "You may debate whether any rock record is worth that extreme self-indulgence. Actually, the most rock & roll thing about Chinese Democracy is [Axl] doesn't care if you do." The magazine later ranked it 12th on its 2008 year-end list.

Jon Dolan (Blender) called the music "brilliant" and "ludicrous", describing the songs as unpredictable suites blending "miasmic industrial grind, stadium rattling metal solos, electronic drift and hip-hop churn." Robert Christgau (MSN Music) said Rose "succeeds, kind of, on his own totally irrelevant terms" and that "Since he's no longer capable of leading young white males astray, this effort isn't just pleasurable artistically. It's touching on a human level. Noble, even. I didn't think he had it in him." CTV News compared the production to Phil Spector's Wall of Sound, while People called it "pure Guns N' Roses." Stephen Thomas Erlewine (Allmusic), while noting the dense production, said "Axl spent the decade-plus in the studio not reinventing but refining, obsessing over a handful of tracks, and spending an inordinate amount of time chasing the sound in his head", calling the album "strangely modest" compared to the Illusion double albums. Sarah Rodman (The Boston Globe) called the album "exciting, urgent, frenzied, heavy, melodic, quirky, melodramatic, and occasionally overbaked."

Mixed reviews noted overproduction and inconsistency. Greg Kot (Chicago Tribune) said the songs "sound like lab experiments, fragments of music arranged into elaborate puzzles of sound" and it sounded like "the work of a fading rock star with far too much money and time." The Guardian found it incohesive but praised Rose's melodies, calling the production "impossibly over-stuffed." Pitchfork criticized the "dated" sound, comparing it to Oasis's 1997 album Be Here Now, calling it a "record of relatively simple, similar songs overdubbed into a false sense of complexity in a horrorshow of modern production values." Q said Rose "did himself a grand disservice" by overloading the mix "throwing everything at the wall and nailing up the stuff that didn't stick." Kitty Empire (The Observer) accused Rose of imitating Nine Inch Nails, calling it "a mish-mash of portentous digitals in search of a purpose." Jon Pareles (The New York Times) called it "a transitional album", saying "Sometime during the years of work, theatricality and razzle-dazzle replaced heart." Michael Saba (Paste) called it the "sonic equivalent of an M.C. Escher painting" and "a bottomless pit dug by disposable income, a persecution complex and egomania." Stephen Davis labeled it "the worst album ever", stating "it's so dense and multilayered... It’s as much a GNR album is [sic] there is real democracy in China... It sounds like a Rob Zombie album from 1995."

The album was nominated for the Juno Award for International Album of the Year in 2009, losing to Coldplay's Viva La Vida. "If the World" was nominated for Best Original Song at the 13th Satellite Awards, losing to "Another Way to Die" by Jack White and Alicia Keys. The album was included on several publications' lists of the best and worst albums of the year. (Note: Best-of lists: ABC News, The Guardian, Rolling Stone, Ultimate Classic Rock, and Spin Worst-of lists: Time Out New York, Asbury Park Press, IGN, and Chicago Tribune)

Buckethead's solo on "There Was a Time" received widespread acclaim. Consequence called it one of the decade's best, Total Guitar ranked it 32nd best of the 21st century, and readers of that magazine ranked it 6th.

=== Former band members' opinions ===
Slash praised the title track, saying, "It's good to hear Axl's voice again." He called the album "a great statement by Axl," noting it was "very different" from classic Guns N' Roses and "something the original band could never make." He later described it as "exactly what I thought it would sound like", citing its use of synthesizers and digital effects. After rejoining the band in 2016, Slash complimented Buckethead's guitar work, saying the players on Chinese Democracy were "fucking amazing."

Izzy Stradlin said he enjoyed the tracks he heard. Duff McKagan praised Rose's vocals and said the album was "the record he wanted to make." Matt Sorum said he was "pleasantly surprised" by the title track, and called the album a "toe-tapper". Gilby Clarke said Rose "hit the nail on the head" with the direction he pursued.

In contrast, Steven Adler said he did not recognize Rose's voice and disliked the album, arguing it should have been released as a solo project. Tracii Guns found it "over-indulgent, sterile and not that exciting." Rob Gardner said it wasn't a "real Guns N' Roses" album due to the lack of involvement of classic-era bandmates.

=== Accolades ===
Accolades for Chinese Democracy
Publication	Accolade	Year	Rank	Ref.
ABC News	50 Best Albums of 2008	2008	50	
The Guardian	50 Albums of the Year	2008	50	
Rolling Stone	Top 50 Albums of 2008	2008	12	
Spin	The 40 Best albums of 2008	2008	unranked	
Ultimate Classic Rock	Top 10 Albums of 2008	2008	4	

== Legacy ==
Retrospective reviews
Review scores
Source	Rating
ARTISTdirect	very positive
Collector's Guide to Heavy Metal	3/10
Classic Rock	2.5/5 stars
Decibel	positive

The album's long-delayed release became its defining narrative. Spin noted that a "cottage industry" emerged around tracking its development, and suggested the only way it could have lived up to its legend was "to never come out at all". Steven Hyden (Grantland) called it "shorthand for the grandest of boondoggles", arguing that the delay overshadowed the music itself. He contrasted it with more modest and successful comeback albums by Daft Punk, David Bowie, Justin Timberlake, and My Bloody Valentine. Ultimate Classic Rock echoed this sentiment, stating the album was "fairly good" but eclipsed by its backstory. It cited artists like Bowie, Steve Perry, and Tool who avoided similar pitfalls by keeping a low profile and meeting fan expectations. The term Chinese Democracy has since become shorthand for long-delayed albums.

The New York Times described it as a "loud last gasp" of the indulgent pop star era, noting the shift to a "leaner and leakier" music industry. Jim DeRogatis likened it to The Godfather Part III, a long-awaited sequel that failed to match its predecessors. Billboard labeled it a "sonic anomaly" of the time due to the mixing and lack of compression making it sound "vintage or alien to rock music fans", and said "the fundamentalist fans would never forgive Axl ... They had waited 14 years for the gustatory pleasure of Appetite for Destruction, and got an album that glittered with synths, dance beats, and orchestral arrangements... It was the hard-rock equivalent of Dylan going electric at Newport." Eddie Trunk said, "I honestly don't think old school fans have any awareness for the record... It didn't have any hits. It wasn't commercially successful. It doesn't have recurrent airplay on classic rock radio, and because of that, the only people that record is on the radar for are extremely hardcore GN'R fans."

Some outlets offered retrospective praise. Complex included it on "50 Albums That Were Unfairly Hated On", praising Rose's vocals and the musicianship, and stating that the album's biggest flaw was the delays in release. Artistdirect called it "a timeless work of art". Apple Music described the album as "a guest-stacked opus orchestrated by Rose" and said "Rose uses his surly, knowing howl to ID these hard rock tunes with his fervent, often imagined, sense of injustice and works his way into quite a tizzy... an album that has taken 15 years to appear and has used 14 studios to create it could only be this grandoise: larger than life in every conceivable way."

Later reassessments were more generous. Ultimate Guitar and Ultimate Classic Rock highlighted "There Was a Time" as a standout. Gary Graff found its "sprawling, indulgent insanity" more enjoyable in hindsight. Loudwire and Rolling Stone both called it "better than remembered", with Joseph Hudak naming "Catcher in the Rye" a highlight. Guitarist Bumblefoot said of the album's legacy, "people were still just going on about how it took this long to make, and it took this much money, and all that nonsense. And I always said, wait 20 years."

Still, criticism persisted. No Recess compared the album to "their own version of Danzig's Blackacidevil", stating "The only thing left was to repeat or radically reinvent themselves. Chinese Democracy tries to do both, to varying degrees of 'okay, sure'." Loudwire ranked it second-to-last among GN'R albums saying, "...there was a lot of expectation and backlash built up on Chinese Democracy before it even dropped in stores", but praised tracks like "Better", "Madagascar", "Street of Dreams", "Shackler's Revenge" and "Catcher in the Rye" as standouts. NME placed it last, calling it "epic, overblown and full of noodling guitar solos". Rolling Stone's Andy Greene listed the album's creation as one of the "50 Worst Decisions in Music History", citing wasted money and fan goodwill. He later ranked it 4th among the "50 Most Disappointing Albums", saying "Despite a handful of strong songs like “Better,” “There Was a Time,” and “Prostitute,” the album is ludicrously overcooked." Former Guns N' Roses manager Alan Niven dismissed it as a "boring Axl solo project".

== Sales ==
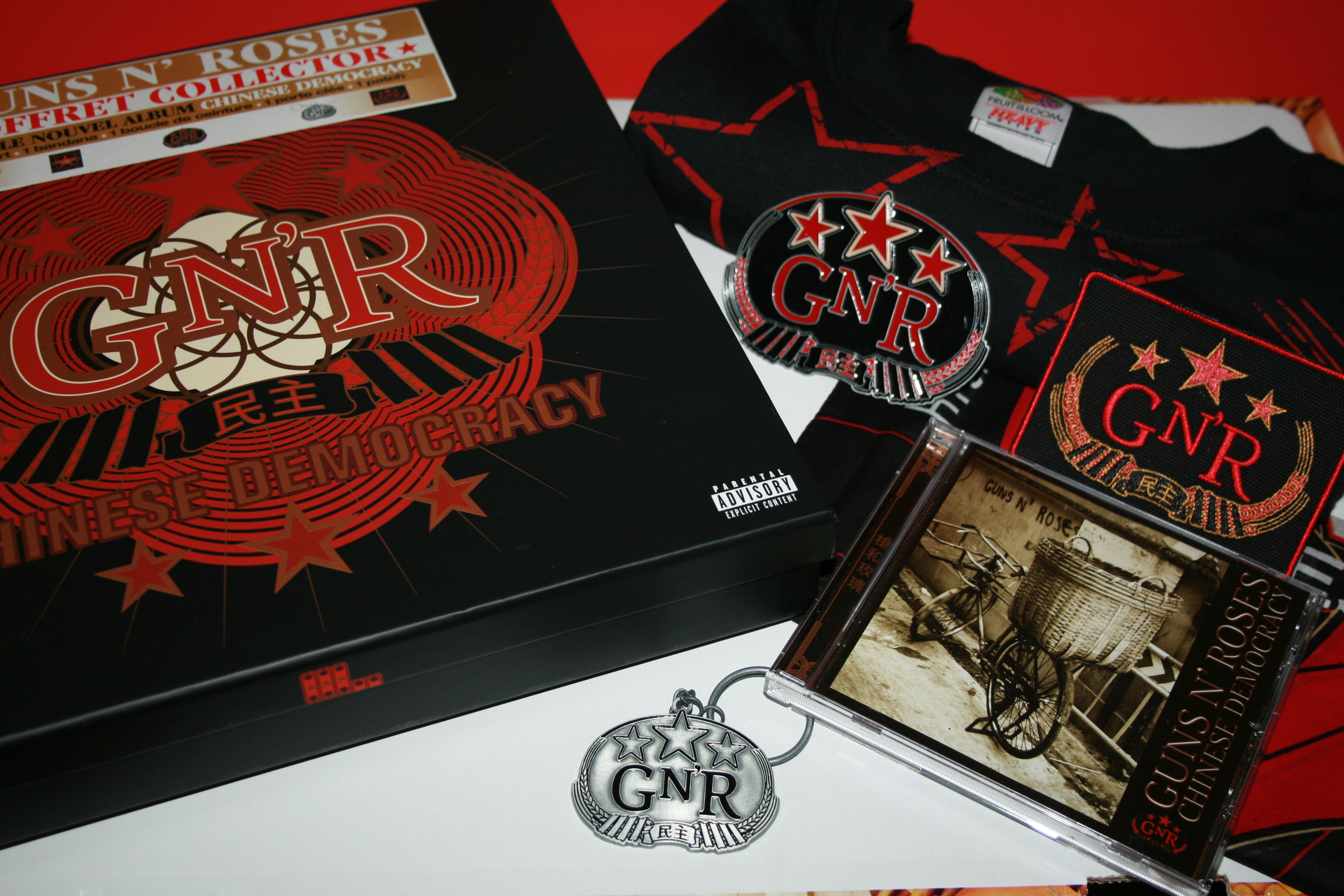
The contents of the deluxe edition of Chinese Democracy

Before release, Best Buy purchased 1.3 million copies of Chinese Democracy from UMG for $14 million, agreeing not to return unsold stock. The album was released on November 22, 2008, in Germany, Switzerland, and Austria, followed by a global release on November 23, except in the UK, where it arrived November 24.

In the U.S., the album debuted at number three on the US Billboard 200 with 261,000 first-week sales, below expectations. It debuted at number two on the UK Albums Chart. U.S. sales dropped 78% in week two, falling to #18. Analysts blamed the holiday release window, Rose's lack of promotion, and the Best Buy exclusivity. Reuters later reported that Best Buy overestimated demand and took a financial loss on unsold inventory.

The album was certified Gold on January 7, 2009, and Platinum on February 3, having shipped one million copies in the U.S. It ranked 55th on the 2009 Billboard 200 Year-End chart. In Europe, it earned an IFPI European Platinum Award for over one million sales, and reached 2.6 million units worldwide by February 2009.

It achieved triple Platinum in Canada and Platinum in countries including Germany, UK, Ireland, Italy, Australia, New Zealand, and South Africa. Gold certifications were awarded in Austria, France, Japan, Brazil, and over 20 other countries.

In April 2011, Best Buy discounted the album to $2, prompting a Billboard re-entry at #198 with 3,200 copies sold. By then, U.S. sales totaled 614,000, according to Nielsen Soundscan. UK sales reached 365,899 by July 2014. Following the 2016 Not in This Lifetime... Tour, digital streams surged from 8 million to 24 million, with 7,900 additional copies sold.

== Track listing ==
Songwriting credits via ASCAP, SESAC & BMI. (Note: Song database references:,,,,,,,,,,,,,)

All lyrics are written by W. Axl Rose. "Madagascar" contains samples of speeches written by Martin Luther King Jr..

Chinese Democracy track listing
No.	Title	Music	Length
1.	"Chinese Democracy"	Rose; Joshua Freese; Paul Tobias; Thomas Stinson; Darren Reed; Robert Finck; Caram Costanzo; Eric Caudieux	4:43
2.	"Shackler's Revenge"	Rose; Finck; Brian Carroll; Costanzo; Bryan Mantia; Peter Scaturro	3:36
3.	"Better"	Rose; Finck	4:57
4.	"Street of Dreams"	Rose; Finck; Reed; Stinson; Tobias	4:46
5.	"If the World"	Rose; Chris Pitman	4:53
6.	"There Was a Time"	Rose; Tobias; Reed; Stinson	6:40
7.	"Catcher in the Rye"	Rose; Stinson; Reed; Finck; Tobias	5:52
8.	"Scraped"	Rose; Carroll; Costanzo	3:30
9.	"Riad N' the Bedouins"	Rose; Finck; Reed; Stinson; Tobias	4:10
10.	"Sorry"	Rose; Carroll; Mantia; Scaturro	6:14
11.	"I.R.S."	Rose; Tobias; Reed	4:27
12.	"Madagascar"	Rose; Pitman	5:37
13.	"This I Love"	Rose	5:34
14.	"Prostitute"	Rose; Finck; Tobias	6:15
Total length:			71:14

== Personnel ==
Credits adapted from the album's liner notes.

=== Guns N' Roses ===
- Axl Rose – lead vocals (all tracks), backing vocals (tracks 7 and 8), guitars (tracks 6 and 12), keyboards (tracks 1, 6 and 13), piano (tracks 7, 13 and 14), synth orchestra (tracks 6 and 13), synth French horns (track 12), sample collage (track 12), arrangements (all tracks), digital editing (all tracks except 7), production, mixing, Logic Pro engineering, art direction (alternate booklets)
- Robin Finck – guitars (all tracks), guitar solos (tracks 1, 3, 4, 6, 11 and 13), acoustic guitar (track 10), keyboards (tracks 3 and 5), intro (track 9), arrangements (tracks 1, 3–7, 9–11 and 14), digital editing and initial production (track 3)
- Ron "Bumblefoot" Thal – guitars (all tracks), guitar solos (tracks 2 and 7–9), arrangements (tracks 1, 2, 7 and 11)
- Buckethead – guitars (all tracks except 7 and 13), guitar solos (tracks 1, 3–6, 8–12 and 14), acoustic guitar (track 5), arrangements (tracks 1, 2, 4–6, 8, 10, 11 and 14)
- Paul Tobias – guitars (tracks 1, 3–7, 9, 11, 12 and 14), piano (track 6), arrangements (tracks 1, 7, 9, 11 and 14)
- Richard Fortus – guitars (tracks 3, 4, 6 and 14), arrangements (track 3)
- Tommy Stinson – bass guitar (all tracks except 5), backing vocals (tracks 1, 3, 4, 6 and 9), arrangements (tracks 1, 4, 6, 7 and 9)
- Brain – drums (all tracks except 1), MPC drums and drum programming (track 11), arrangements (tracks 2–4, 6, 10–12 and 14), initial production (tracks 2 and 10), additional engineering (track 10), Logic Pro engineering
- Frank Ferrer – drums (tracks 1, 3, 5, 6 and 11), arrangements (track 1)
- Dizzy Reed – keyboards (tracks 1–4, 6–9, 11 and 14), piano (tracks 4 and 5), congas (track 8), synth orchestra (tracks 4, 6, 13 and 14), orchestra (track 14), backing vocals (tracks 1, 3, 4, 6 and 9), intro (track 9), arrangements (tracks 4, 6, 7, 9 and 12–14), Logic Pro engineering
- Chris Pitman – keyboards (tracks 1–8, 10, 12 and 13), sub-bass (all tracks except 7), bass (tracks 5 and 12), additional bass (track 6), twelve-string guitar (track 5), string machine (track 5), Mellotron (track 6), synth orchestra (tracks 4, 6, 13 and 14), MPC drums and drum programming (track 5), drum programming (track 6), backing vocals (tracks 3 and 6), additional guitar processing (track 1), arrangements (tracks 5, 6, 12 and 13), digital editing (tracks 5, 12 and 13), initial production (tracks 5 and 12), additional production, Logic Pro engineering
- Josh Freese – drum arrangements (tracks 4, 6, 9 and 14)

=== Additional musicians ===
- Marco Beltrami – orchestra and arrangements (tracks 4, 6 and 12–14)
- Paul Buckmaster – orchestra (tracks 4, 6 and 14), additional orchestra (track 12), orchestral arrangements (tracks 4, 6 and 12)
- Suzy Katayama – horn arrangements (tracks 6, 12 and 13), choir arrangements (tracks 6 and 13), French horn (track 12)
- Sebastian Bach – backing vocals (track 10)
- Patti Hood – harp (track 13)

=== Production ===
- Caram Costanzo – production, mixing, engineering, digital editing (all tracks except 7), arrangements (tracks 2, 3, 6, 8 and 14), initial production (track 8), intro (track 1), sub drums (track 13)
- Roy Thomas Baker – additional production and preproduction
- Jeff "Critter" Newell, Dan Monti, Jeremy Blair – additional and initial engineering
- Eric Caudieux – digital editing (all tracks), intro (track 1), additional MPC drums and drum programming (track 5), arrangements (track 6), sub drums (track 13), additional production, Pro Tools engineering
- Sean Beavan – recording of Rose's initial vocals and digital editing (tracks 1, 4–6, 9, 11, 12 and 14), arrangements (tracks 1, 4, 6, 7, 9 and 11), initial production (tracks 4–6, 11 and 12), additional Pro Tools
- Youth – initial arrangement suggestions and additional demo preproduction (track 12)
- Pete Scaturro – arrangements and initial production (tracks 2 and 10), keyboards, digital editing and additional engineering (track 10)
- Billy Howerdel – recording of Rose's guitars and digital editing (track 6), Logic Pro engineering
- Stuart White – Logic Pro engineering
- John O'Mahony – Pro Tools mix engineer
- Okhee Kim, Andy Gwynn, Brian Monteath, Dave Dominguez, Jose Borges, Joe Peluso, Christian Baker, James Musshorn, Jan Petrov, Jeff Robinette, Bob Koszela, Paul Payne, Mark Gray, Xavier Albira, Dror Mohar, Erich Tabala, Shawn Berman, Donald Clark, Shinnosuke Miyazawa, Vanessa Parr, John Beene, Al Perrotta – assistant engineers
- Greg Morgenstein, Paul DeCarli, Billy Bowers, Justin Walden, Rail Jon Rogut, Isaac Abolin – additional Pro Tools
- Andy Wallace – mixing
- Mike Scielzi, Paul Saurez – mix assistants
- Bob Ludwig – mastering

=== Design ===
- Ryan Corey – art direction, design
- Somyot Hananuntasuk – illustrations
- Sasha Volkova – illustration
- Terry Hardin – cover photography
- George Chin – photography
- Shi Lifeng – artwork (Red Star; "Controlling" alternate Red Hand cover)
- Lie Yuan, He An, Jiang Congi, Kevin Zuckerman, Lian Xue Ming, Anton S. Kandinsky, Marat Bekeev, Xiao Ping, Lou Jie, Sandra Yagi, Socar Myles, Rankin, Johnie Hurtig, Gloria Gaddis – illustrations (alternate booklets)

== Charts ==
=== Weekly charts ===
Weekly chart performance for Chinese Democracy
Chart (2008)	Peak position
Argentine Albums (CAPIF)	1
Australian Albums (ARIA)	3
Austrian Albums (Ö3 Austria)	3
Belgian Albums (Ultratop Flanders)	4
Belgian Albums (Ultratop Wallonia)	19
Canadian Albums (Billboard)	1
Danish Albums (Hitlisten)	6
Dutch Albums (Album Top 100)	4
European Albums (Billboard)	1
Finnish Albums (Suomen virallinen lista)	1
French Albums (SNEP)	10
German Albums (Offizielle Top 100)	2
Greek Albums	10
Hungarian Albums (MAHASZ)	4
Irish Albums (IRMA)	3
Israeli Albums Chart	3
Italian Albums (FIMI)	3
Japanese Albums (Oricon)	3
Mexican Albums (Top 100 Mexico)	4
New Zealand Albums (RMNZ)	1
Norwegian Albums (VG-lista)	2
Polish Albums (ZPAV)	1
Portuguese Albums (AFP)	9
Russian Albums (2M)	4
Scottish Albums (Official Charts)	2
Slovenian Albums (IFPI)	1
Spanish Albums (Promusicae)	8
Swedish Albums (Sverigetopplistan)	4
Swiss Albums (Schweizer Hitparade)	1
Taiwanese Albums (Five Music)	1
UK Albums (Official Charts)	2
UK Rock & Metal Albums (Official Charts)	1
US Billboard 200	3
US Top Hard Rock Albums (Billboard)	1
US Top Rock Albums (Billboard)	1

=== Year-end charts ===
2008 year-end chart performance for Chinese Democracy
Chart (2008)	Position
Australian Albums (ARIA)	35
Danish Albums (Hitlisten)	30
Dutch Albums (Album Top 100)	85
Hungarian Albums (MAHASZ)	41
Italian Albums (FIMI)	33
Japanese Albums (Oricon)	100
New Zealand Albums (RMNZ)	25
Swiss Albums (Schweizer Hitparade)	46
UK Albums (OCC)	41
Worldwide Albums (IFPI)	14

2009 year-end chart performance for Chinese Democracy
Chart (2009)	Position
Canadian Albums (Billboard)	15
European Albums (Billboard)	36
Italian Albums (FIMI)	95
Swiss Albums (Schweizer Hitparade)	89
US Billboard 200	55
US Top Rock Albums (Billboard)	16

== Certifications and sales ==
Certifications and sales for Chinese Democracy
Region	Certification	Certified units/sales
Argentina (CAPIF)	Platinum	40,000^{^}
Australia (ARIA)	Platinum	70,000^{^}
Belgium (BRMA)	Gold	15,000^{*}
Brazil (Pro-Música Brasil)	Platinum	60,000^{‡}
Denmark (IFPI Danmark)	Gold	15,000^{^}
Finland (Musiikkituottajat)	Platinum	32,610
Germany (BVMI)	Gold	100,000^{^}
Greece (IFPI Greece)	Gold	7,500^{^}
Hungary (MAHASZ)	Gold	3,000^{^}
Ireland (IRMA)	Platinum	15,000^{^}
Italy sales in 2008	—	105,000
Italy (FIMI) sales since 2009	Gold	25,000^{*}
Japan (RIAJ)	Gold	100,000^{^}
New Zealand (RMNZ)	Platinum	15,000^{^}
Norway	—	33,000
Poland (ZPAV)	Platinum	20,000^{*}
Russia (NFPF)	Gold	10,000^{*}
Sweden (GLF)	Gold	20,000^{^}
United Kingdom (BPI)	Platinum	300,000^{^}
United States (RIAA)	Platinum	1,000,000^{^}
Summaries
Europe (IFPI)	Platinum	1,000,000^{*}
^{*} Sales figures based on certification alone.^{^} Shipments figures based on certification alone.^{‡} Sales+streaming figures based on certification alone.

== Release history ==
Release history
Date	Region	Format	Label
November 22, 2008	Japan	CD, digital download	Geffen / Black Frog
November 22, 2008	Australia	CD, digital download	Geffen / Black Frog
November 23, 2008	United States	CD, digital download	Geffen / Black Frog
November 23, 2008	Canada	CD, digital download	Geffen / Black Frog
November 24, 2008	United Kingdom	CD, digital download	Geffen / Black Frog
November 24, 2008	Europe	CD, digital download	Geffen / Black Frog
November 2008	Worldwide	Vinyl (limited release)	Geffen / Black Frog

== See also ==
- List of longest gaps between studio albums
