= Prostitute (song) =

Song by Guns N' Roses

from the album Chinese Democracy
- Released: November 23, 2008
- Recorded: 1999–February 2007
- Length: 6:15
- Label: Geffen
- Songwriters: Axl Rose; Robin Finck; Paul Tobias
- Producers: Axl Rose; Caram Costanzo

"Prostitute" is the fourteenth and final track from Chinese Democracy, Guns N' Roses' sixth studio album, released in 2008. The song is written by Axl Rose and Paul Tobias with additional work by Robin Finck.

== Background & style ==
The song was first mentioned in a July 1999 issue of Spin Magazine, saying "Rose is laboring over a song with the working title 'Prostitute', according to Youth, but past successes weigh heavily on him."

The song had originally only been played four times, one time in Osaka, another in Tokyo, during Guns N' Roses' 2009–2011 World Tour and in 2014 at two shows in Las Vegas. It was occasionally performed in 2017 during Not In This Lifetime… Tour as well.

This track is available as a downloadable song for the Rock Band series.

The lyrics feature Rose singing "Ask yourself / Why I would choose / To prostitute myself / To live with fortune and shame.” The song was described by Loudwire as "blending classical orchestrations and electro-beats with blistering guitar solos and some of [Rose's] highest pitched shrieking."

== Reception ==
Consequence of Sound reacted positively to the song, stating "Some might roll their eyes or laugh, but this glossy driver is a great song. It’s heavy, but not too heavy. There’s the piano, a thumbing percussion, and Rose, who sounds exceptional in the album’s final moments. Think Bruce Hornsby on distortion, if that’s even possible. It’s a fitting closer, given the album’s thematic elements, and strong enough to leave listeners, both old and new, wanting more." Pitchfork complimented the song's melodies, but criticized the simplistic drumming. Rolling Stone stated "At the end of the album, on the bluntly titled 'Prostitute,' Rose veers from an almost conversational tenor, over a ticking-bomb shuffle, to five-guitar barrage, orchestral lightning and righteous howl."

Ultimate Classic Rock included the song on its 2014 list of "Five Songs On Chinese Democracy You Need To Hear Again", stating "this alternately ruminative and explosive track ends the album in an extremely thrilling manner". In 2016, Spin ranked the song 68th out of 70 on its ranking of every Guns N' Roses song, stating "The Chinese Democracy closer, and for at least its first minute, probably the only GN’R song that would ever make sense as One Tree Hill montage music". Loudwire ranked the song 73rd out of 87, stating "Musically, the song is an interesting fusion, too, blending classical orchestrations and electro-beats with blistering guitar solos and some of the singer’s highest pitched shrieking."

Actor Nicolas Cage declared he is a fan of the band and described "Prostitute" as an "incredible" song.

== Personnel ==
Credits are adapted from the album's liner notes.

Guns N' Roses

- Axl Rose – vocals, piano, arrangement
- Buckethead – lead guitar, rhythm guitar
- Ron "Bumblefoot" Thal – lead guitar, rhythm guitar
- Robin Finck – rhythm guitar
- Paul Tobias – rhythm guitar
- Richard Fortus – rhythm guitar
- Tommy Stinson – bass
- Brain – drums
- Dizzy Reed – keyboards, synthesizers
- Chris Pitman – sub bass, synthesizers

Additional credits

- Orchestra – Marco Beltrami, Paul Buckmaster
- Orchestral arrangement – Marco Beltrami, Paul Buckmaster, Dizzy Reed
- Synth orchestra – Dizzy Reed, Chris Pitman
- Guitar solos – Buckethead
- Drum arrangement – Brain, Caram Costanzo, Josh Freese
- Digital editing – Eric Caudieux, Caram Costanzo, Axl Rose, Sean Beavan
- Recording – Sean Beavan
- Mixing – Andy Wallace
- Mastering – Bob Ludwig
