= There Was a Time (disambiguation) =

"There Was a Time" is a song written and performed by James Brown.

There Was a Time' may also refer to:

- "There Was a Time" (Guns N' Roses song)
- There Was A Time, 1981 Zohar Argov album
- "There Was a Time", bonus track for the 1968 album Electric Warrior by T.Rex and side B of their single "Get It On"
- 1986 single by Canadian band One to One
