= Madagascar (song) =

Song by Guns N' Roses

from the album Chinese Democracy
- Released: November 23, 2008
- Recorded: 2000–2006
- Length: 5:37
- Label: Geffen
- Songwriters: Axl Rose; Chris Pitman
- Producers: Axl Rose; Caram Costanzo

"Madagascar" is a song by the American rock band Guns N' Roses, written by Axl Rose and keyboardist Chris Pitman and featured on their sixth studio album, Chinese Democracy, released in 2008.

The song is the 12th song on the album, featuring dramatic orchestral arrangements and numerous audio samples during its bridge, including several from Martin Luther King Jr.'s 1963 speech "I Have a Dream" and 1967 sermon "Why Jesus Called Man a Fool", and others from the motion pictures Cool Hand Luke, Mississippi Burning, Casualties of War, Braveheart, and Seven.

== History and composition ==
The song was first performed publicly at the 2001 Rock in Rio 3 event in Brazil. It was announced by Axl Rose as being "a brand new song" which he hoped would "express his sentiment".

On Pitman's official Facebook page, he posted a photo of Rose playing guitar on this song from its debut performance, commenting: "Axl... wrote all the gtr parts, including lead gtr. I recorded him playing lots of awesome guitar parts back then, I don't think people know what an original and cool guitar player he really is, ... those were fun times".

Pitman spoke of the writing of this song on Talking Metal in 2008, saying, "I was up at his house for about a week or two, and I was setting up rack mounted samplers, and you had your fake orchestra with synthesizers. One would be the strings, one would be the brass, and I was setting that up for him, and I was going 'now this module here, we’re going to us this for brass instruments and here you have horns…', and he was playing while I was switching the sounds, and I switched the sounds to French horn sound and he was playing this chord progression and I went to another sound, and he goes 'oh no, go back to that one'. We went back and it was the French horn sound and he kept playing this progression and it sounded really cool and I turned around and turned on the tape machine and that ended up being the very intro for the song 'Madagascar'. And that’s just how that evolved and he just had this chord progression and all of [a] sudden it married with the French horn and it was their super-moody song and that was the start of that song. We actually recorded it really quickly up there at his house and he just sang unbelievably on it".

The song's intro and outro sections feature French horns played at slow speed by musician Suzie Katayama, while the song's instrumental break, or bridge, features dramatic orchestral string arrangements and audio samples of the "I Have a Dream" speech. Samples from numerous films including Cool Hand Luke, Braveheart and Seven also feature. During live performances, images of Martin Luther King Jr. delivering his speeches are shown on large video screens during this section.

== Live performances ==
"Madagascar" has been played at nearly every concert since its live debut in 2001, having been played 204 times live by the end of the US 2012 Up Close and Personal Tour. The song was absent at the start of the Not in This Lifetime... Tour, but returned during the 8th leg.

== Personnel ==
Credits are adapted from the album's liner notes.

Guns N' Roses

- Axl Rose – lead vocals, rhythm guitar, keyboards, synthesizer
- Robin Finck – rhythm guitar
- Buckethead – lead guitar, rhythm guitar
- Paul Tobias – rhythm guitar
- Ron "Bumblefoot" Thal – rhythm guitar
- Tommy Stinson – bass guitar
- Brain – drums
- Chris Pitman – keyboards, sub bass, bass

Additional credits

- Orchestra – Marco Beltrami
- Additional orchestra – Paul Buckmaster
- Orchestral arrangement – Marco Beltrami, Paul Buckmaster, Axl Rose, Dizzy Reed, Chris Pitman
- French horns – Suzie Katayama
- Horn arrangement – Axl Rose, Suzie Katayama
- Synth French horns – Axl Rose
- Drum programming – Chris Pitman
- Guitar solos – Buckethead
- Sample collage – Axl Rose
- Arrangement – Axl Rose, Chris Pitman
- Drum arrangement – Chris Pitman, Brain
- Digital editing – Chris Pitman, Eric Caudieux, Caram Costanzo, Axl Rose, Sean Beavan
