= Better (Guns N' Roses song) =

Promotional single by Guns N' Roses

from the album Chinese Democracy
- Released: November 17, 2008
- Recorded: 2001–2007
- Genre: Hard rock
- Length: 4:58
- Label: Geffen
- Songwriters: Axl Rose; Robin Finck
- Producers: Axl Rose; Caram Costanzo

"Better" (formerly known as "Three Dollar Pyramid") is a song by American rock band Guns N' Roses, featured on their 2008 sixth studio album, Chinese Democracy. It was sent out as the second radio promo from the album, after "Chinese Democracy", but was not commercially released as a single eligible for international sales charts.

== Background ==
"Better" was written by lead vocalist Axl Rose and former Guns N' Roses guitarist Robin Finck between 2001 and 2003, before the band headed out on tour in 2006. By that time the song had already been recorded; later, however, most of former drummer Brain's drums on the track were edited by drummer Frank Ferrer. Prior to the song being released as a single, "Better" had been played live by Guns N' Roses on their Chinese Democracy Tour in 2006 and 2007. In February 2006, the song, alongside a few other unreleased songs, was leaked onto the internet through a Guns N' Roses fan site. The band's management requested that all links to the MP3 files and all lyrics to the songs be removed from forums and websites.

Coinciding with the 2006 tour, the song "Better" appeared in an internet advertisement for Harley-Davidson in October 2006. Keyboardist Dizzy Reed stated that the release was an accident, with two versions being made, one 'experimental edit' featuring a demo of "Better" and one with "Paradise City". The ad with "Better" was mislabeled and inadvertently uploaded online for a day before being replaced by the intended ad with "Paradise City". The 'final' version of the song was leaked online to positive reviews in February 2007.

== Music video ==
Breaking a two-month silence by posting on a message board on December 11, 2008, Axl Rose revealed that a music video for "Better" directed by Dale "Rage" Resteghini would be released "soon". Shortly after, Rose wrote that Lars Ulrich stated that he makes an appearance in the video saying, "There’s a shot of me and Axl embracing backstage at some concert, and I signed off that, and hopefully it’ll make it in the final cut.” Ulrich was later blamed by Rose's manager, Fernando Lebeis, to be the reason the video has been delayed, since "the Metallica drummer needed to sign a release". Ulrich responded by saying, “I have heard about this, yes. There was a couple of clips of me in the video and they asked if I would sign off on it. When it got to me, I signed off on the one clip… I don’t know where [the rumor] came from. I’d love to be in a Guns N’ Roses video. It’s my favorite song on the record — I think it’s a great song." On December 30, 2008, Rose wrote on the message board, "Lars isn't holding anything up with our video. Our message board comments were meant casually, in fun and amongst friends...We hope to have our video out shortly." The video was never officially released, however, on September 13, 2012, nearly four years after the single release, a workprint of the video leaked onto the internet. Resteghini said of the cancelled video, "Ultimately they didn’t want it to come out, but somebody released it, and that’s what you’re seeing online. That same video is the one that played on all their LED screens on their tour in 2010 and 11. I don’t have the specifics as to why it was not released."

== Live ==
"Better" debuted live on May 12, 2006, at the Hammerstein Ballroom in New York. It has been played at almost every show since. During the Not in This Lifetime... Tour, a new version of the song was played, featuring an additional intro and the opening lines being sung by Duff McKagan, Dizzy Reed and Melissa Reese.

== Reception ==
The song has received a positive reception from critics. Consequence of Sound wrote, "While there’s the industrial-like swagger that’s prevalent in 'Chinese Democracy', the bite and harmony is classic GN’R. In fact, this might actually be the best song on the record, out of all three singles released from the record it has been considered to be the lead single." Rolling Stone concluded, "Like 'Chinese Democracy', 'Better' feels like classic Guns N’ Roses — Rose’s growling croon in the verses could have floated out of the Use Your Illusion sessions."

The song was officially released as a single on November 17, 2008. On Rolling Stone's "100 Best Singles of 2008" list, "Better" placed at number 19. Consequence of Sound stated the song was the "hit" of the album, saying, "Anyone who’s ever doubted this current line up should listen to this song. It’s brutal, honest, and aggressive. Rose sings with a cadence that’s uncanny, and he hasn’t sounded this youthful and bittersweet since 1987’s 'Sweet Child of Mine'. When guitarist Robin Finck wails at 3:43, there’s this feeling that screams, 'They’re back,' even if 'they' aren’t."

In a retrospective on the album, Steven Hyden of Grantland.com stated the song is "the album’s catchiest track" and "the poppiest song in the GNR catalogue next to Don't Cry". The Rock and Roll Hall of Fame blog listed the song as one of the 10 'essential' Guns N' Roses songs. In 2016 Spin ranked it as the 6th best Guns N' Roses song out of 79.

== Personnel ==
Credits are adapted from the album's liner notes.

Guns N' Roses

- Axl Rose – lead vocals
- Robin Finck – lead guitar, keyboards
- Paul Tobias, Richard Fortus and Ron "Bumblefoot" Thal – rhythm guitar
- Buckethead – lead guitar
- Tommy Stinson – bass, backing vocals
- Brain – drums
- Frank Ferrer – drums
- Dizzy Reed – keyboards, backing vocals
- Chris Pitman – keyboards, sub bass, backing vocals

Additional credits

- Guitar solos – Buckethead, Robin Finck
- Arrangement – Robin Finck, Axl Rose
- Drum arrangement – Robin Finck, Caram Costanzo, Brain
- Digital editing – Eric Caudieux, Caram Costanzo, Robin Finck, Axl Rose

== Chart positions ==
| Chart (2008) | Peak position |
|---|---|
| US Mainstream Rock Airplay (Billboard) | 18 |

== Certifications ==
| Region | Certification | Certified units/sales |
|---|---|---|
| Brazil (Pro-Música Brasil) | Gold | 30,000^{‡} |
^{‡} Sales+streaming figures based on certification alone.
