= Paul Tobias =

American guitarist (born 1963)

- Also known as: Paul Huge
- Born: Indianapolis, Indiana, U.S.
- Origin: Los Angeles, California, U.S.
- Genre: Hard rock
- Occupations: Musician; songwriter
- Instruments: Guitar; keyboards
- Years active: 1984–present
- Formerly of: Guns N' Roses; Mank Rage

Paul Tobias (also known as Paul Edward Huge (pronounced hugh-gee); is an American guitarist best known for his work with the hard rock band Guns N' Roses, with whom he was associated from 1994 to 2002.

== Biography ==
Born in Indianapolis, Tobias grew up in Lafayette and is a childhood friend of Axl Rose. Following the formation of Rose's band Hollywood Rose in 1983, the band's demo tape featured two songs co-written by Rose and Tobias: "Shadow of Your Love" and "Back Off Bitch". In 1985, Rose formed Guns N' Roses and released their debut album, Appetite for Destruction, in 1987. While "Shadow of Your Love" was re-recorded during the album's sessions, it did not make the final tracklist, though Tobias was thanked in the album's credits. The song was later released as a B-side of the album's first single, "It's So Easy/Mr. Brownstone".

In 1991, a re-recorded version of "Back Off Bitch" was featured on Guns N' Roses' third studio album, Use Your Illusion I. Rose stated in an interview with Rolling Stone in 1992 that the song was ten years old at that time. In late 1994, Tobias joined Guns N' Roses as a replacement for Gilby Clarke and played rhythm and lead guitar on the band's cover version of the Rolling Stones' "Sympathy for the Devil". While Tobias contributed to the song at Rose's request, his inclusion caused friction between Rose and the band's then-lead guitarist Slash due to an overdub made by Tobias of Slash's solo on the track.

Tobias would go on to work and record with Guns N' Roses in 1996, when the band began working on their sixth studio album. His role in the band was not clarified publicly at the time, as it was uncertain whether he would eventually feature on the album and subsequent tours as a rhythm guitarist. Rose further explained that the intention behind bringing in Tobias was to help the band in the studio:

"The public gets a different story from the other guys – Slash, Duff, Matt – who have their own agendas. The original intentions between Paul and myself were that Paul was going to help me for as long as it took to get this thing together in whatever capacity that he could help me in. So when he first was brought into this, he was brought in as a writer to work with Slash. At the time those guys never suggested one name."

In 1997, Tobias began working for Guns N' Roses full-time in a studio setting, jamming and recording song ideas with keyboardist Dizzy Reed and then-lead guitarist Robin Finck, among others. During these sessions, Tobias and Reed wrote the song "Oh My God", which was later featured on the soundtrack of the 1999 film End of Days. In January 2001, Tobias made his live debut with Guns N' Roses as the band played their first concerts in eight years at Las Vegas's House of Blues and Rock in Rio III. Rose introduced Tobias on stage at both shows as someone who had helped him keep the band together during the past years. In Rio, Rose also noted that Tobias had previously played live only a handful of times. The band played their next two concerts in December 2001, also in Las Vegas, which marked Tobias' last appearances as a band member.

In mid-2002, due to his aversion to touring, Tobias was replaced in the band by Richard Fortus. At the time, it was not officially stated that Tobias had left Guns N' Roses. During that same year, Tobias' other band, Mank Rage, expressed interest in releasing an album consisting of material recorded prior to his tenure with Guns N' Roses. In July 2006, several of the band's demos were posted on MySpace. In 2008, Guns N' Roses released Chinese Democracy, and Tobias was credited as a co-writer on seven songs, in addition to contributing arrangements, and guitar and piano parts. (Note: In the album's liner notes, Tobias is credited as the co-writer of "There Was a Time", "Catcher in the Rye", "I.R.S." and "Prostitute". In the ASCAP repertory, he is listed as the co-writer of three additional songs: "Chinese Democracy", "Street of Dreams" and "Riad N' the Bedouins".) In 2018, Tobias was again associated with Guns N' Roses when "Shadow of Your Love" was released as a single and included on the deluxe edition of Appetite for Destruction. He received further writing credits for the band's singles "Hard Skool" and "Perhaps", released in 2021 and 2023, respectively.

== Discography ==
=== Writing and instrumental credits ===
| Year | Artist | Title | Song(s) | Notes |
|---|---|---|---|---|
| 1991 | Guns N' Roses | Use Your Illusion I | "Back Off Bitch" | Writer |
| 1994 | Guns N' Roses | Interview With The Vampire (soundtrack) | "Sympathy for the Devil" | Guitars |
| 1999 | Guns N' Roses | End of Days (soundtrack) | "Oh My God" | Writer, performer |
| 2008 | Guns N' Roses | Chinese Democracy | "Chinese Democracy", "Street of Dreams", "There Was a Time", "Catcher in the Rye", "Riad N' the Bedouins", "I.R.S.", "Prostitute" | Writer |
| 2008 | Guns N' Roses | Chinese Democracy | "Chinese Democracy", "I.R.S." | Arrangements |
| 2008 | Guns N' Roses | Chinese Democracy | "Chinese Democracy", "Better", "Street of Dreams", "If the World", "There Was a Time", "Catcher in the Rye", "Riad N' the Bedouins", "I.R.S.", "Madagascar", "Prostitute" | Guitars |
| 2008 | Guns N' Roses | Chinese Democracy | "There Was a Time" | Piano |
| 2018 | Guns N' Roses | – | "Shadow of Your Love" | Writer |
| 2021 | Guns N' Roses | – | "Hard Skool" | Writer |
| 2023 | Guns N' Roses | – | "Perhaps" | Writer |
