= There Was a Time (Guns N' Roses song) =

Song by Guns N' Roses

from the album Chinese Democracy
- Released: November 23, 2008
- Recorded: 1998–2007
- Genre: Hard rock
- Length: 6:41
- Label: Black Frog / Geffen
- Songwriters: Axl Rose, Paul Tobias, Dizzy Reed, Tommy Stinson
- Producers: Axl Rose; Caram Costanzo

"There Was a Time" is a song by the American rock band Guns N' Roses, written by Axl Rose, Paul Tobias, Dizzy Reed, and Tommy Stinson and featured on their sixth studio album, Chinese Democracy, released in 2008.

== History and composition ==
The song was initially written in the late 90's under the abbreviated title TWAT.

The song first leaked online in February 2006, alongside 4 other songs from the album. A newer version was leaked in May 2007.

"There Was a Time" is a heavily layered melody-driven orchestral song with a mellotron, violins, choirs and multiple synthesizers. Spin described the song as "Bluesy piano and slyly cinematic passage set up the highest notes Axl's full-health throat has ever belted." Apple Music described the song as featuring "prog rock mellotron and strings". Ultimate Classic Rock stated the song is "a mesmerizing cocktail of minimalist hip-hop beats, lush string arrangements, transcendent guitar solos and some of Rose's most ear-piercing, tortured screams — sometimes happening all at once."

== Live performances ==
Due to the technical demanding nature of the song, the band has not played the song live often. It was played a half dozen times during the Chinese Democracy Tour, starting in 2006, the Appetite for Democracy Tour in 2012-2014, ten times during the Not In This Lifetime... Tour in 2016 and 2017, seven times during the Guns N' Roses 2023 Tour, and just once during the 2025 Because What You Want & What You Get Are Two Completely Different Things Tour tour.

== Reception ==
And there is so much going on in "There Was a Time" - strings and Mellotron, a full-strength choir and Rose’s overdubbed sour-growl harmonies, wah-wah guitar and a false ending (more choir) — that it’s easy to believe Rose spent most of the past decade on that arrangement alone. But it is never a mess, more like a loud mass of bad memories and hard lessons. In the first lines, Rose goes back to a beginning much like his own ... then piles on the wreckage along with the orchestra and guitars. By the end, it’s one big melt of missing and kiss-off.. If this is the Guns n’ Roses that Rose kept hearing in his head all this time, it is obvious why two guitars, bass and drums were never going to be enough." - Rolling Stone's Dave Fricke

Spin ranked the song 30th out of 79 in their ranking of Guns N' Roses songs. Loudwire ranked it the 38th, stating "While it’s certainly much different from anything else the band has ever done, it stands out as one of the most unique (and also one of the most confused) tracks from Chinese Democracy. MetalSucks ranked the song 13th in the band's catalog, stating "it feels like everything Axl was trying to accomplish with Chinese Democracy captured in one glorious track. It’s a really satisfying of mix of new and old." Consequence named it 9th on their list of "Guns N’ Roses’ 10 Best Songs", stating " Its use of symphonic strings, dense harmonies, and electronic beats make it commendably elaborate, adding weight to the more conventional elements. The various guitarists — such as Bumblefoot and Buckethead — fill in nicely, and Rose hits some truly impressive notes, fortifying the track as a multifaceted gem."

In 2021, Ultimate Guitar and Ultimate Classic Rock both highlighted it as the standout track on Chinese Democracy. Steven Hyden of Grantland.com stated the song was one of his two favorites from the album. Billboard named it alongside two other tracks as “song(s) worthy of joining the Guns N’ Roses canon.” Uproxx stated the song was "like "Bitter Sweet Symphony" as produced by Roy Thomas Baker and pumped up with the best guitar solos Geffen’s money could buy, like The Edge channeling Eddie Van Halen while jumping out of a plane with Dimebag Darrell. Kerrang called it the album's pièce de résistance, noting influences form Danny Elfman, The Eagles and Carlos Santana.

Buckethead's guitar solo in the song received critical acclaim: Consequence stated it was one of the best solos of the decade, Total Guitar editors ranked it as the 32nd best of the 21st century, while readers ranked it 6th.

== Personnel ==
Credits adapted from the album's liner notes.

Guns N' Roses

- Axl Rose - lead vocals, guitar, keyboards, orchestral arrangement, string synthesizer, choir and additional horn arrangements, arrangement, drum arrangement, digital editing
- Robin Finck - lead guitar, guitar solo, additional arrangements
- Buckethead - lead guitar, guitar solo, additional arrangements
- Bumblefoot - guitar
- Paul Tobias - guitar, piano
- Richard Fortus - guitar
- Tommy Stinson - bass, background vocals, additional arrangements
- Dizzy Reed - keyboards, background vocals, orchestral arrangement, string synthesizer
- Chris Pitman - keyboards, bass (additional), sub-bass, Mellotron, background vocals, orchestral arrangement, string synthesizer, drum programming, additional arrangements, drum arrangement
- Josh Freese - drum arrangement
- Brain - drums, drum arrangement
- Frank Ferrer - drums

Additional personnel

- Marco Beltrami - orchestra, orchestral arrangement
- Paul Buckmaster - orchestra, orchestral arrangement
- Caram Costanzo - arrangement, drum arrangement, digital editing
- Eric Caudieux - arrangement, digital editing
- Sean Beaven - arrangement, digital editing
- Suzy Katayama - choir and additional horn arrangements
- Billy Howerdel - digital editing
