= Jay Busbee =

American journalist (born 1968)

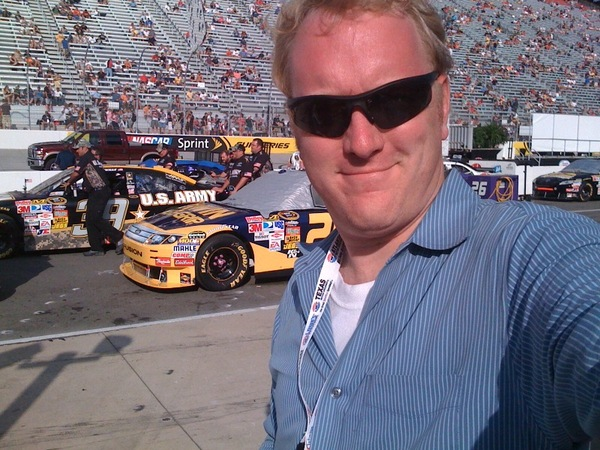
- Busbee at Bristol Motor Speedway in 2009
- Born: Howard James Busbee Jr. December 13, 1968 (age 57); Lynchburg, Virginia, U.S.
- Education: College of William & Mary (BA); University of Michigan (MFA)
- Occupations: Novelist; short story writer; journalist; columnist
- Children: Riley and Logan
- Writing career
- Genres: Sports, Fantasy, Science fiction, Drama, Horror, Business
- Website: www.jaybusbee.com

Jay Busbee (born Howard James Busbee Jr. on December 13, 1968, in Lynchburg, Virginia) is an American journalist, novelist, sportswriter and writer of comic books.

== Early life and education ==
Busbee was raised in Atlanta, GA. He graduated from Riverwood High School in 1986, is a 1990 graduate of the College of William & Mary's English program and a 1996 graduate of the University of Memphis’s Creative Writing MFA program.

== Career ==
Busbee's work has appeared in ESPN.com, Esquire Magazine, USA Today, The Washington Post, Atlanta Magazine, Slam Magazine, The Chicago Sports Review, Memphis Magazine, 64, Bluff Magazine, Mid-South Sports and Leisure, The Flat Hat, The Memphis Flyer and many other publications. Jay Busbee is the creator and head writer for Sports Gone South.

He is a contributing editor of Atlanta magazine, and also writes the monthly "Painting the Corners" column for ChopTalk, the official Atlanta Braves magazine. He has scripted comic books published by Arcana Studio and Digital Webbing. He has also written the books The Face of the River, Sundown and Bluff City. He has also co-written Jam! Amp Your Team, Rock Your Business and the comic books Velvet Rope and Kade: Rising Sun. He contributed the third story of the book Postcards: True Stories That Never Happened.

On February 16, 2016, Busbee published Earnhardt Nation: The Full-Throttle Saga of NASCAR's First Family.

He has appeared in The People Vs. Larry Flynt, and continues to teach English at Georgia Perimeter College.

Busbee currently edits From the Marbles, the official Yahoo! Sports NASCAR blog, and Devil Ball Golf, the official Yahoo! Sports golf blog. He also contributes to The Post Game.

He is currently writing another novel called Run & Shoot.
