= Eric Caudieux =

- Born: Eric Caudieux; 30 June 1963 (age 63); Paris
- Genres: Post-bop, hard rock, blues rock
- Occupation: Musician
- Instrument: Keyboards
- Years active: Late 1980s–present

Eric Caudieux is a French sound engineer and producer. An accomplished player of the keyboards and rhythm guitar, he is best known for his work with Joe Satriani, appearing on many of his albums and as a member of his backing group when he is on tour. As an engineer, editor, producer and composer he has worked with other artists including Guns N' Roses, Katy Perry, Dido, Brad Mehldau and Blake Mills. As a guitarist, he is left handed.

Caudieux was a music editor on the set of I Heart Huckabees (2004). He also worked on the set of Synecdoche, New York (2008).
