= Guns N' Roses (EP) =

EP by Guns N' Roses
- Released: May 11, 1988
- Recorded: Studio tracks: 1986–1987; Live tracks: June 28, 1987
- Venue: Marquee Club, London (live tracks)
- Genre: Hard rock
- Length: 25:58
- Label: Geffen
- Producer: Guns N' Roses; Vic Maile; Mike Clink

Guns N' Roses chronology
Appetite for Destruction (1987)	Guns N' Roses (1988)	G N' R Lies (1988)

Guns N' Roses, also known in Japanese as Live from the Jungle (Japanese: ライブ・フロム・ザ・ジャングル, romanized: Raibu furomu za Janguru) is the second EP by American hard rock band Guns N' Roses. It was released on May 11, 1988, exclusively in Japan.

== Background ==
The record was released in Japan only and features "Sweet Child o' Mine" from the album Appetite for Destruction plus tracks that had been previously released in 1987 on the 12" singles of "It's So Easy"/"Mr. Brownstone" and "Welcome to the Jungle". The EP is often called Live from the Jungle, named so because all Japanese text on the album related to its title reads ライブ・フロム・ザ・ジャングル ガンズ・アンド・ローゼズ ("Raibu furomu za Janguru / Ganzu ando Rōzezu"), meaning "Live from the jungle: Guns N' Roses". The equivalent English text on the album simply reads "E.P. / Guns N' Roses". This is a reference to the song "Welcome to the Jungle", even though the song itself doesn't appear on the EP. The record has been released in vinyl, cassette, and CD format.

Tracks one, four and five were recorded live at the Marquee Club in London on June 28, 1987. Tracks two and three are studio recordings with overdubbed crowd noise. Track three was originally released on the EP Live ?!*@ Like a Suicide and later on the album G N' R Lies. Track 6 is the studio version from Appetite for Destruction. The cover features the banned Robert Williams artwork also used (but very briefly) for Appetite for Destruction.

== Track listing ==
No.	Title	Writer(s)	Note(s)	Length
1.	"It's So Easy"	Guns N' Roses, West Arkeen	Live recording	3:58
2.	"Shadow of Your Love"	Axl Rose, Izzy Stradlin, Paul Tobias	Faux live recording (studio track with overdubbed crowd noise)	3:06
3.	"Move to the City"	Stradlin, Del James, Chris Weber	Same version as on Live ?!*@ Like a Suicide	3:44
4.	"Knockin' on Heaven's Door" (Bob Dylan cover)	Bob Dylan	Live recording	4:40
5.	"Whole Lotta Rosie" (AC/DC cover)	Angus Young, Malcolm Young, Bon Scott	Live recording	4:30
6.	"Sweet Child o' Mine"	Guns N' Roses	Same version as on Appetite for Destruction	5:52
Total length:				25:58

== Personnel ==
- W. Axl Rose – lead vocals
- Slash – lead guitar
- Izzy Stradlin – rhythm guitar, backing vocals
- Duff "Rose" McKagan – bass guitar, backing vocals
- Steven Adler – drums, percussion
