= The Roots of Guns N' Roses =

Compilation album by Hollywood Rose
- Released: June 22, 2004
- Recorded: January 1984
- Genre: Glam metal
- Length: 58:57
- Label: Cleopatra
- Producer: Chris Weber

Professional ratings
Review scores
Source	Rating
AllMusic	4/5 stars

The Roots of Guns N' Roses is a compilation album containing old songs of Hollywood Rose. It was released on June 22, 2004, by Deadline Music (Cleopatra Records).

== Background ==
The album consist of the five demo tracks which were recorded by Hollywood Rose and produced by Chris Weber, the band's guitarist at the time, who also originally paid for the recordings in 1984. Cleopatra Records bought the recordings and released them as three sets of five demos: the first five are original versions, the following five have been remixed by former Guns N' Roses guitarist Gilby Clarke, and the last five have been remixed by Fred Coury, the drummer of Cinderella, who took part in a tour with Guns N' Roses when Steven Adler broke his wrist in 1987.

The "Shadow of Your Love" and "Reckless Life" remixes by Gilby Clarke feature guitar overdubs by the first guitarist of Guns N' Roses, Tracii Guns.

Guns N' Roses later recorded and released their versions of three songs: "Reckless Life" (from Live ?!*@ Like a Suicide), "Anything Goes" (from Appetite for Destruction and "Shadow of Your Love" (from Live from the Jungle) and thus feature the Guns N' Roses writing credit from Slash, Duff McKagan and Steven Adler, together with Axl Rose, Izzy Stradlin and Chris Weber. However, these songs were originally performed by Hollywood Rose when they were not yet in touch with Slash, McKagan or Adler.

Before the album's release in June 2004, Rose sued the record label Cleopatra Records for "trademark infringement, violation of rights in his name and likeness, and for unfair competition", and filed a motion to block the release. However, a judge denied the motion and the album was released.

On January 18, 2005, the Japanese version was released by Sony, together with a bonus DVD.

== Track listing ==
No.	Title	Writer(s)	Length
1.	"Killing Time" (Original demo version)	Chris Weber, Axl Rose	3:39
2.	"Anything Goes" (Original demo version)	Rose, Izzy Stradlin, Weber	5:07
3.	"Rocker" (Original demo version)	Weber, Rose	3:50
4.	"Shadow of Your Love" (Original demo version)	Rose, Stradlin, Paul Tobias	2:58
5.	"Reckless Life" (Original demo version)	Rose, Stradlin	4:40
6.	"Killing Time" (Gilby Clarke remix)	Weber, Rose	3:28
7.	"Anything Goes" (Gilby Clarke remix)	Rose, Stradlin, Weber	4:55
8.	"Rocker" (Gilby Clarke remix)	Weber, Rose	3:35
9.	"Shadow of Your Love" (Gilby Clarke remix)	Rose, Stradlin, Tobias	2:47
10.	"Reckless Life" (Gilby Clarke remix)	Rose, Stradlin	4:41
11.	"Killing Time" (Fred Coury remix)	Weber, Rose	3:26
12.	"Anything Goes" (Fred Coury remix)	Rose, Stradlin, Weber	4:31
13.	"Rocker" (Fred Coury remix)	Weber, Rose	3:34
14.	"Shadow of Your Love" (Fred Coury remix)	Rose, Stradlin	3:00
15.	"Reckless Life" (Fred Coury remix)	Rose, Stradlin	4:46

== Personnel ==
Hollywood Rose

- W. Axl Rose – lead vocals
- Izzy Stradlin – rhythm guitar, bass, backing vocals
- Chris Weber – lead guitar, bass
- Johnny Kreis – drums

Additional personnel

- Tracii Guns – guitar on tracks 9 and 10
