= Hollywood Rose =

American glam metal band

- Hollywood Rose playing Madame Wong's East on 28 June 1984. From left to right, bassist Steve Darrow, singer Axl Rose, drummer Steven Adler, and guitarist Slash.

Background information
- Also known as: AXL, Rose
- Origin: Los Angeles, California, U.S.
- Genre: Glam metal
- Years active: 1983–1984, 1985, 1989–1990
- Label: Deadline (division of Cleopatra)
- Spinoffs: Guns N' Roses
- Past members: Chris Weber; Jimmy Swan; Matt Beal; Donny Brook; "Captain"; Axl Rose; Izzy Stradlin; Johnny Kreis; Rick Marrs; Andre Troxx; Daniel "DJ" Nicolson; Steve Darrow; Slash; Steven Adler; Rob Gardner; Tracii Guns

Hollywood Rose was an American glam metal group formed in June 1983. They are best known as a precursor for what would eventually become Guns N' Roses. The group was founded by Axl Rose, Izzy Stradlin and Chris Weber, while they were aided during live shows by Rick Marrs, Andre Troxx, Daniel "DJ" Nicolson, Johnny Kreis and Steve Darrow. Rose, Stradlin and Weber, along with Kreis and Nicolson, recorded a five-song demo in January 1984. However, after a number of lineup changes, which included Weber, Kreis and Nicolson being replaced by Slash and Steven Adler (both then of Road Crew) as well as the departure of Stradlin, the group disbanded the same year.

Hollywood Rose reunited for a New Year's show on 1 January 1985 with Rose, Stradlin, and Darrow returning and adding former L.A. Guns drummer Rob Gardner to the group. L.A. Guns founder Tracii Guns replaced Weber for the reunion gig. In March 1985, they merged with L.A. Guns to become Guns N' Roses.

The five-song demo was released on 22 June 2004 with the title The Roots of Guns N' Roses. A number of Hollywood Rose songs were included on the Guns N' Roses albums Live ?!*@ Like a Suicide (1986), Appetite for Destruction (1987), Live from the Jungle (1987), and G N' R Lies (1988).

== History ==
=== Formation (1983) ===
Guitarist Chris Weber was introduced to Lafayette native Izzy Stradlin in the parking lot of the Rainbow Bar and Grill, by friend Tracii Guns, who was leading the first incarnation of L.A. Guns at this time, after Weber expressed an interest in forming a band.

Soon afterwards, Weber and Stradlin started writing material and, at the suggestion of Stradlin, recruited his childhood friend, former Rapidfire singer Axl Rose, then known as Bill Rose. At the suggestion of Rose, the group called themselves AXL, with Rose adopting Axl as his first name. They played their first gig at The Orphanage in North Hollywood and played a few more shows before changing their name to Rose. The group soon changed their name, for the final time, to Hollywood Rose when Weber discovered that the name Rose was already being used by a New York band.

During the group's live shows, they were aided by bassists Rick Marrs, Andre Troxx, Daniel "DJ" Nicolson and Steve Darrow, along with drummer Johnny Kreis, who remained the only consistent member of the group outside of Rose, Stradlin and Weber.

=== Lineup changes, Guns N' Roses (1984–1985) ===
After borrowing money from Weber's father, the group recorded a five-song demo in Hollywood in 1984.

After playing a number of shows, they appeared at the Music Machine in 1984, opening for Stryper. During the show, Weber accidentally hit Rose with the headstock of his guitar. Rose stormed off and eventually fired Weber from the band, with former Road Crew guitarist Slash joining the group. Unhappy at the firing of Weber, Stradlin left the group when Slash first came to rehearse, going on to join London. Slash's Road Crew bandmate Steven Adler also replaced drummer Kreis during this time. The group continued to play more shows before eventually disbanding, playing their final show at The Troubadour in 1984. Rose went on to front L.A. Guns, while Slash auditioned for Poison at the suggestion of former guitarist Matt Smith.

The group reunited for a New Years celebration show on 1 January 1985, with Rose, Stradlin and Darrow returning, joined by L.A. Guns drummer Rob Gardner. Weber, who had moved to New York City, was replaced by Tracii Guns for the gig.

In March 1985, Hollywood Rose merged with L.A. Guns forming Guns N' Roses. The initial lineup consisted of Axl Rose, Tracii Guns, Izzy Stradlin, Ole Beich and Rob Gardner.

Beich, Guns and Gardner were all gone from the band within two months and replaced by Duff McKagan, Slash (a former member of Hollywood Rose), and Steven Adler. The lineup of Rose, Stradlin, McKagan, Slash and Adler became known as the "classic lineup" of Guns N' Roses.

A number of Hollywood Rose songs would be included on releases by Guns N' Roses, including "Anything Goes" (from Appetite for Destruction), "Reckless Life" and "Move to the City" (both from Live ?!*@ Like a Suicide and G N' R Lies) as well as "Shadow of Your Love" (from Live from the Jungle).

In 1998, former guitarist Weber sued Axl Rose, claiming that he co-wrote two songs he was not credited for, "Shadow of Your Love" and "Back Off Bitch" (from Use Your Illusion I).

=== The Roots of Guns N' Roses (2004) ===
In 2004, Weber, who had formed U.P.O. since leaving the band, sold the five-song demo the group recorded in 1984 to Cleopatra Records.

They released the album, which included, along with the original recordings, remixes by former Guns N' Roses guitarist Gilby Clarke (which featured additional guitar overdubs by Tracii Guns) and former London and Cinderella drummer Fred Coury (who had filled in for Guns N' Roses drummer Steven Adler for a few shows) on June 22 with the title The Roots of Guns N' Roses. The Japanese edition of the album included a DVD with footage of the group.

On 21 June 2004, Axl Rose sought an injunction against the release of the album, suing Cleopatra Records for trademark infringement, violation of rights in his name and likeness, and unfair competition.

Slash and former Guns N' Roses bassist Duff McKagan were also named as plaintiffs with Rose. However, on July 6, United States district court Judge Gary A. Fees denied the motion of Rose and his Guns N' Roses partnership for a preliminary injunction against the independent record label.

In 2012, Cleopatra Records re-released a CD entitled Dopesnake by a similarly named Guns N' Roses tribute act named Hollywood Roses (plural), which had been originally put out in 2007 by another label. There were no songs by either Guns N' Roses or Hollywood Rose on the album, but it did feature guest performances by Phil Lewis of L.A. Guns as well as Guns N' Roses veterans Tracii Guns, Gilby Clarke, Chris Weber and Teddy Zig Zag.

== Band members ==
=== Final lineup ===
- Jimmy Swan – lead vocals (1989–1990)
- Chris Weber – lead guitar (1983–1984, 1989–1990)
- Matt Beal – rhythm guitar (1989-1990)
- Donny Brook – bass guitar (1989–1990)
- "Captain" – drums (1989–1990)

=== Past members ===
- Axl Rose – lead vocals (1983–1984, 1985)
- Izzy Stradlin – rhythm guitar, backing vocals (1983–1984, 1985)
- Johnny Kreis – drums (1983–1984)
- Rick Marrs – bass guitar (1983)
- Andre Troxx – bass guitar (1983)
- Daniel "DJ" Nicolson – bass guitar (1984)
- Steve Darrow – bass guitar (1984, 1985)
- Slash – lead and rhythm guitar (1984)
- Steven Adler – drums, backing vocals (1984)
- Tracii Guns – lead guitar, backing vocals (1985)
- Rob Gardner – drums, backing vocals (1985)

== Discography ==
=== Compilation albums ===
- The Roots of Guns N' Roses (2004)

== See also ==
- List of glam metal bands and artists
