= Live ?!*@ Like a Suicide =

Live ?!★@ Like a Suicide

EP by Guns N' Roses
- Released: December 16, 1986
- Recorded: 1986
- Studio: Pasha Music House North Hollywood, California
- Length: 13:22
- Label: UZI Suicide
- Producer: Guns N' Roses

Guns N' Roses chronology
Live ?!★@ Like a Suicide (1986)	Appetite for Destruction (1987)

Live ?!★@ Like a Suicide is an EP by American hard rock band Guns N' Roses, released on December 16, 1986, on the Uzi Suicide record label. It is a faux live recording, with crowd noises added in the studio, as the band was told it would be too expensive to record an actual live recording. The record itself was reportedly limited to only 10,000 copies, released only in vinyl and cassette formats.

The tracks were later re-released along with four new acoustic songs as the album G N' R Lies (1988).

In 2018, they were included as bonus tracks on the super deluxe edition of Appetite for Destruction and featured seamless crowd noise between the songs along with a fifth song, "Shadow of Your Love".

== Background ==
The four songs on the EP were selected from the band's demo tapes: two are cover versions and two are originals. The EP was a faux-live recording with overdubbed crowd noise, but these are in fact studio performances.

According to Steven Adler's autobiography, My Appetite for Destruction: Sex & Drugs & Guns N' Roses, the entire EP was recorded at Pasha Studios in Hollywood with pre-recorded audience applause and cheering in the background, as Geffen's engineers told him "it would cost too much to actually record a live record". Duff McKagan says in his autobiography, It's So Easy (and other Lies), that "the crowd noise...is from a 1970's rock festival called the Texxas Jam. We thought it would be funny to put a huge stadium crowd in the background at a time when we were lucky to be playing to a few hundred."

"Reckless Life" is the opening track on the EP. It opens with Slash shouting "Hey fuckers! Suck on Guns N' fuckin' Roses!" This song was originally written by Hollywood Rose, which had included all the members of Guns N' Roses except Duff McKagan at one point or another. It was included in the Hollywood Rose compilation album The Roots of Guns N' Roses. "Nice Boys" is a cover of a song by Rose Tattoo. "Move to the City" features a horn section and is also from the Hollywood Rose era. The fourth track on the EP is "Mama Kin" which is a cover of a song by Aerosmith, a band Guns N' Roses has cited as one of their major influences.

One song considered for this EP was "Shadow of Your Love", which never made it onto the album, and later released on the "It’s So Easy/Mr. Brownstone" single and the Live from the Jungle EP.

== Artwork ==
The front cover consists of a photograph of two of the band members, Duff McKagan and Axl Rose (from left to right), with an early Guns N' Roses logo, designed by Slash, overhead.

== Promotion ==
To celebrate the release of the EP Guns N' Roses had a release party at Riki Rachtman's World Famous Cathouse. That was the first live performance at the club. It was acoustic and this was before MTV had the unplugged series, so an acoustic set from a heavy metal act was rather obscure in 1986. In 2010, Steven Adler claimed that Guns N' Roses got Rodney on the ROQ at KROQ-FM to initially play "Reckless Life" by giving Rodney one gram of cocaine.

== Critical reception ==
Professional ratings
Review scores
Source	Rating
Allmusic	3.5/5 stars
Rolling Stone	2/5 stars

In April 1987, Sounds critic Paul Elliott called it a "trashy, fun but so-so" EP but nonetheless commented that the music had an "air plastering of dirt 'n' grime and down-at-heel seediness" that was still evident in the demo material for Appetite for Deconstruction. Two months later, Sylvie Simmons wrote in Kerrang! that the "delirious" indie EP was "a greasy, lemon-squeezy slice of smirking, strutting vinyl." Describing it as an "indie bar-band object", critic Chuck Eddy considers the EP to comprise "by-the-numbers Aerosmith and Rose Tattoo speedboogie reconstructions and a couple ballsy-but-inconsequential speedboogie originals." Rolling Stone consider the EP to comprise "four pleasantly raw live tracks". In his G N' R Lies review for AllMusic, Stephen Thomas Erlewine writes: "Live ?!*@ Like a Suicide is competent bar band boogie, without the energy or danger of Appetite for Destruction."

== Track listing ==
No.	Title	Writer(s)	Length
1.	"Reckless Life"	Axl Rose, Slash, Izzy Stradlin, Chris Weber	3:20
2.	"Nice Boys" (Rose Tattoo cover)	Angry Anderson, Mick Cocks, Geordie Leach, Dallas "Digger" Royall, Peter Wells	3:03
3.	"Move to the City"	Izzy Stradlin, Daniel Nicolson (a/k/a D.J.), Weber	3:42
4.	"Mama Kin" (Aerosmith cover)	Steven Tyler	3:57
Total length:			13:22

== Personnel ==
Adapted from AllMusic.

- W. Axl Rose – lead vocals, production
- Slash – lead and rhythm guitars, slide guitar, backing vocals, production
- Izzy Stradlin – rhythm and lead guitars, backing vocals, production
- Duff "Rose" McKagan – bass, backing vocals, production
- Steven Adler – drums, percussion, production
