= Sweet Child o' Mine =

1988 single by Guns N' Roses

- 1988 US vinyl issue

Single by Guns N' Roses

from the album Appetite for Destruction
- B-side: "It's So Easy" (live)
- Released: June 3, 1988
- Recorded: 1987, Los Angeles
- Genre: Hard rock
- Length: 5:55 (album version); 4:53 (single version)
- Label: Geffen; Uzi Suicide
- Songwriters: Steven Adler; Saul Hudson; Duff McKagan; Axl Rose; Izzy Stradlin
- Producer: Mike Clink

Guns N' Roses singles chronology
"Welcome to the Jungle" (1987)	"Sweet Child o' Mine" (1988)	"Paradise City" (1989)

Music videos
- "Sweet Child o' Mine" on YouTube
- "Sweet Child o' Mine" (Alternate version) on YouTube

Audio
- "Sweet Child o' Mine" (Album version) on YouTube

Audio sample
- "Sweet Child o' Mine": file; help

"Sweet Child o' Mine" is a song by American rock band Guns N' Roses, released on their debut studio album, Appetite for Destruction (1987). In the United States, the song was released in June 1988, topping the US Billboard Hot 100 chart and becoming the band's only US number-one single. In the United Kingdom, the song was released in August 1988, reaching number 24 on the UK Singles Chart the same month. In May 1989, it was re-released there in a slightly remixed form and peaked at number six.

== Background and composition ==
During a jam session at the band's house in Sunset Strip, drummer Steven Adler and Slash were warming up and Slash began to play a "circus" melody while making faces at Adler. Rhythm guitarist Izzy Stradlin asked Slash to play it again. Stradlin came up with some chords, Duff McKagan created a bassline and Adler planned a beat. In his autobiography, Slash said "within an hour my guitar exercise had become something else." Lead singer Axl Rose was listening to the musicians upstairs in his room and was inspired to write lyrics, which he completed by the following afternoon. He based it on his girlfriend Erin Everly (daughter of Don Everly, of the Everly Brothers, and Venetia Stevenson), and declared that Lynyrd Skynyrd served as an inspiration "to make sure that we'd got that heartfelt feeling." On the next composing session in Burbank, the band added a bridge and a guitar solo.

When the band recorded demos with producer Spencer Proffer, he suggested adding a breakdown at the song's end. The musicians agreed, but were not sure what to do. Listening to the demo in a loop, Rose started saying to himself, "Where do we go? Where do we go now?" and Proffer suggested that he sing that. An alternate version featuring half a live version, half a newly recorded 1999 version plays during the credits of the movie Big Daddy.

== Music video ==
A music video (directed by Nigel Dick) was made for the song in 1987. The music video depicts the band rehearsing in Mendiola's Ballroom at Huntington Park, California, surrounded by crew members. All of the band members' girlfriends at the time were shown in the clip: Rose's girlfriend Erin Everly; McKagan's girlfriend Mandy Brix, from the all-female rock band the Lame Flames; Stradlin's girlfriend Angela Nicoletti; Adler's girlfriend Cheryl Swiderski; and Slash's girlfriend Sally McLaughlin. Stradlin's dog was also shown. The video was successful on MTV, and helped launch the song to mainstream success.

To make "Sweet Child o' Mine" more marketable to MTV and radio stations, the song was edited down from 5:56 to 4:58, for the radio edit/remix, with much of Slash's guitar solo removed. This drew the ire of the band, including Rose, who commented on it in a 1989 interview with Rolling Stone: "I hate the edit of 'Sweet Child o' Mine.' Radio stations said, 'Well, your vocals aren't cut.' My favorite part of the song is Slash's slow solo; it's the heaviest part for me. There's no reason for it to be missing except to create more space for commercials, so the radio-station owners can get more advertising dollars. When you get the chopped version of 'Paradise City' or half of 'Sweet Child' and 'Patience' cut, you're getting screwed."

A 7-inch vinyl format and cassette single were released. The album version of the song was included on the US single release, while the UK single was the "edit/remix" version. The 12-inch vinyl format also contained the longer LP version. The B-side to the single is a non-album, live version of "It's So Easy."

On an interview on Eddie Trunk's New York radio show in May 2006, Rose stated that his original concept for the video focused on the theme of drug trafficking. According to Rose, the video was to depict an Asian woman carrying a baby into a foreign land, only to discover at the end that the child was dead and filled with heroin. This concept was rejected by Geffen Records.

This song was used for a teaser trailer premiere of Thor: Love and Thunder, which released on April 18, 2022, and the film itself, including the end credits. As of June 2025, the music video currently has over 1.7 billion views on YouTube.

== Reception ==
"Sweet Child o' Mine" placed number 37 on Guitar World's list of the "100 Greatest Guitar Solos." It also came in at number three on Blender's 500 Greatest Songs Since You Were Born, and at number 196 on Rolling Stone's The 500 Greatest Songs of All Time in 2004 and 88th in the 2021 list.

In March 2005, Q magazine placed it at number six in its list of the 100 Greatest Guitar Tracks. On a 2004 Total Guitar magazine poll, the introduction's famous riff was voted the number one riff of all-time by the readers of the magazine. It was also in Rolling Stone's 40 Greatest Songs that Changed the World. It places number seven in VH1's "100 Greatest Songs of the '80s," and placed number 210 on the Recording Industry Association of America (RIAA) Songs of the Century list.

The song has sold 2,609,000 digital copies in the United States as of March 2012. In 2017, Paste ranked the song number 10 on their list of the 15 greatest Guns N' Roses songs, and in 2020, Kerrang ranked the song number eight on their list of the 20 greatest Guns N' Roses songs.

Guitarist Slash said in 1990, "[The song] turned into a huge hit and now it makes me sick. I mean, I like it, but I hate what it represents."

Cash Box called it a "medium tempo rocker by the new hero's [sic] of metal, featuring a nice breakdown" and "standout guitar playing."

== Australian Crawl controversy ==
In 2015, the web page of the Australian music TV channel MAX published an article by music writer Nathan Jolly that noted similarities between "Sweet Child o' Mine" and the song "Unpublished Critics" by the Australian band Australian Crawl, from 1981. The article included both songs, inviting readers to compare the two. It also cited a reader's comment on an earlier article that had originally drawn attention to the similarities between the songs. As of May 2015, this comment no longer appeared on the earlier article. The story went viral quickly, encouraging several comments on both the MAX article and the suggestion that "Unpublished Critics" had influenced "Sweet Child o' Mine," including one from Duff McKagan, bass player with Guns N' Roses when "Sweet Child o' Mine" was written and recorded. McKagan found the similarities between the songs "stunning," but said he had not previously heard "Unpublished Critics." In 2016, Simon Binks reportedly downplayed the similarities, writing in a YouTube comment, "I just can't see Axl and Slash listening to Australian Crawl. It's a really common chord progression. There must be hundreds of songs with the same progression."

== Uses in media ==
The song has been used in numerous films and series, most recently in the 2025 series finale of Cobra Kai. Other films and series include:

- Bad Dreams (1988)
- The Wrestler (2008)
- Step Brothers (2008)
- The Big Short (2015)
- Captain Fantastic (2016)
- Thor: Love and Thunder (2022)
- Mobile Suit Gundam Hathaway - The Sorcery of Nymph Circe (2026)

Slash performs his guitar solo as a guitarist auditioning for a band in a Capital One commercial in which the theme is "easiest decision in the history of decisions."

== Formats and track listings ==
All tracks are written by Guns N' Roses except where noted.

US 7-inch vinyl (27963-7)
No.	Title	Length
1.	"Sweet Child o' Mine" (LP version)	5:55
2.	"It's So Easy" (live at The Marquee Club June 28, 1987)

UK 1988 7-inch vinyl (GEF 43)
No.	Title	Length
1.	"Sweet Child o' Mine" (remix/edit)	3:57
2.	"Out Ta Get Me" (LP version)	4:20
Total length:		8:17

UK 1988 10-inch and 12-inch vinyl (GEF 43TE; GEF 43T)
No.	Title	Length
1.	"Sweet Child o' Mine" (LP version)	5:55
2.	"Out Ta Get Me" (LP version)	4:20
3.	"Rocket Queen" (LP version)

UK 1989 7-inch vinyl (GEF 55)
No.	Title	Length
1.	"Sweet Child o' Mine" (remix/edit)	3:57
2.	"Out Ta Get Me" (LP version)	4:20

UK 1989 12-inch vinyl and 3-inch CD (GEF 55T; GEF 55CD)
No.	Title	Writer(s)	Length
1.	"Sweet Child o' Mine" (LP version)		5:55
2.	"Move to the City" (LP version)	Guns N' Roses, Del James, Chris Weber	3:47
3.	"Whole Lotta Rosie" (live AC/DC cover)	Angus Young, Malcolm Young, Bon Scott	4:34
4.	"It's So Easy" (live)	Guns N' Roses, West Arkeen	3:51

== Personnel ==
- W. Axl Rose – lead vocals, backing vocals
- Slash – lead guitar
- Izzy Stradlin – rhythm guitar, backing vocals
- Duff "Rose" McKagan – bass guitar, backing vocals
- Steven Adler – drums

== Charts ==
=== Weekly charts ===
1988–1989 weekly chart performance for "Sweet Child o' Mine"
Chart (1988–1989)	Peak position
Australia (ARIA)	11
Austria (Ö3 Austria Top 40)	11
Belgium (Ultratop 50 Flanders)	36
Canada Top Singles (RPM)	7
Europe (Eurochart Hot 100)	23
Finland (Suomen virallinen lista)	23
Ireland (IRMA)	4
Netherlands (Dutch Top 40)	24
Netherlands (Single Top 100)	20
New Zealand (Recorded Music NZ)	5
Sweden (Sverigetopplistan)	27
Switzerland (Schweizer Hitparade)	15
UK Singles (Official Charts)	6
US Billboard Hot 100	1
US Mainstream Rock (Billboard)	7
US Cash Box Top 100	1

2011 weekly chart performance for "Sweet Child o' Mine"
Chart (2011)	Peak position
Spain (Promusicae)	30
UK Rock & Metal (Official Charts)	1

2019–2026 weekly chart performance for "Sweet Child o' Mine"
Chart (2019–2026)	Peak position
Brazil Hot 100 (Billboard)	85
Global 200 (Billboard)	57
Hungary (Single Top 40)	31
Japan Download Songs (Billboard Japan)	56
Portugal (AFP)	90

=== Year-end charts ===
1988 year-end chart performance for "Sweet Child o' Mine"
Chart (1988)	Position
Australia (ARIA)	61
Canada Top Singles (RPM)	50
New Zealand (RIANZ)	16
US Billboard Hot 100	5

2021 year-end chart performance for "Sweet Child o' Mine"
Chart (2021)	Position
Global 200 (Billboard)	142

2022 year-end chart performance for "Sweet Child o' Mine"
Chart (2022)	Position
Global 200 (Billboard)	114

2023 year-end chart performance for "Sweet Child o' Mine"
Chart (2023)	Position
Global 200 (Billboard)	119

2024 year-end chart performance for "Sweet Child o' Mine"
Chart (2024)	Position
Global 200 (Billboard)	175

2025 year-end chart performance for "Sweet Child o' Mine"
Chart (2025)	Position
Argentina Anglo Airplay (Monitor Latino)	90
Global 200 (Billboard)	168

== Certifications ==
Certifications for "Sweet Child o' Mine"
Region	Certification	Certified units/sales
Australia (ARIA)	8× Platinum	560,000^{‡}
Brazil (Pro-Música Brasil)	Diamond	250,000^{‡}
Denmark (IFPI Danmark)	2× Platinum	180,000^{‡}
Germany (BVMI)	Platinum	600,000^{‡}
Italy (FIMI) sales since 2009	3× Platinum	150,000^{‡}
New Zealand (RMNZ)	9× Platinum	270,000^{‡}
Portugal (AFP)	5× Platinum	50,000^{‡}
Spain (Promusicae)	4× Platinum	240,000^{‡}
United Kingdom (BPI)	5× Platinum	3,000,000^{‡}
United States (RIAA) Physical	Gold	500,000^{^}
United States (RIAA) Digital	Gold	3,126,000
United States (RIAA) Mastertone	Platinum	1,000,000^{*}
^{*} Sales figures based on certification alone.^{^} Shipments figures based on certification alone.^{‡} Sales+streaming figures based on certification alone.

== Release history ==
Release dates and formats for "Sweet Child o' Mine"
Region	Date	Format(s)	Label(s)	Ref.
United States	June 3, 1988	7-inch vinyl; cassette	Geffen; Uzi Suicide	
United Kingdom	August 8, 1988	7-inch vinyl; 12-inch vinyl	Geffen	
United Kingdom (remix)	May 22, 1989	7-inch vinyl; 12-inch vinyl; CD	Geffen	
United Kingdom (remix)	June 12, 1989	7-inch vinyl (special packaging)	Geffen	

== Sheryl Crow version ==
"Sweet Child o' Mine"

Single by Sheryl Crow

from the album Big Daddy soundtrack
- B-side: "If It Makes You Happy"; "A Change Would Do You Good"; "Leaving Las Vegas"
- Released: May 31, 1999
- Genre: Americana; country
- Length: 3:49
- Label: A&M
- Songwriter: Guns N' Roses
- Producers: Rick Rubin, Sheryl Crow

Sheryl Crow singles chronology
"Anything but Down" (1999)	"Sweet Child o' Mine" (1999)	"Soak Up the Sun" (2002)

Audio video
- "Sweet Child O' Mine" on YouTube

The song was covered by Sheryl Crow on the soundtrack to Big Daddy, and released as a bonus track on her third studio album, The Globe Sessions. The recording was produced by Rick Rubin and Crow. A music video for Crow's version was also released, directed by Stéphane Sednaoui. Crow performed the song live at Woodstock '99.

Ultimate Classic Rock profiled the song as part of a series on "Terrible Classic Rock Covers", and Rolling Stone readers named it the fourth worst cover song of all-time. Despite its negative reception, it became a moderate hit in Australia, Canada, Iceland, Ireland and the United Kingdom, and it earned Crow a Grammy Award for Best Female Rock Vocal Performance.

=== Charts ===
Weekly chart performance for "Sweet Child o' Mine" by Sheryl Crow
Chart (1999)	Peak position
Australia (ARIA)	60
Belgium (Ultratip Bubbling Under Flanders)	9
Canada Top Singles (RPM)	42
Canada Rock/Alternative (RPM)	26
Europe (Eurochart Hot 100)	79
Iceland (Íslenski Listinn Topp 40)	11
Ireland (IRMA)	26
Netherlands (Single Top 100)	95
Quebec (ADISQ)	6
Scottish Singles Sales (Official Charts)	24
UK Singles (Official Charts)	30
US Adult Pop Airplay (Billboard)	29

== Taken by Trees version ==
"Sweet Child o' Mine"

Single by Taken by Trees
- B-side: "Above You"
- Released: November 23, 2009
- Genre: Indie pop
- Label: Rough Trade
- Songwriter: Guns N' Roses

Taken by Trees singles chronology
"Lost & Found" (2007)	"Sweet Child o' Mine" (2009)	"Dreams" (2012)

John Lewis Christmas advert singles chronology
"Sweet Child o' Mine" (2009)	"Your Song" (2010)

In 2009, Taken by Trees, the solo project of Swedish singer Victoria Bergsman, former lead singer of the Concretes, covered the song for the 2009 John Lewis & Partners Christmas advert, a UK advertising tradition since 2007. It was later announced that the version would be released as their next UK single. It was also used in the promotional trailers for the 2009 remake of The Last House on the Left. The song was also used in the final scene for the 2010 film Life as We Know It. Bergsman's version reached number 23 on the UK Singles Chart on November 28, 2009, during a six week spell in the top 75.

=== Charts ===
Weekly chart performance for "Sweet Child o' Mine" by Taken by Trees
Chart (2009)	Peak position
UK Singles (OCC)	23
UK Indie (Official Charts)	1

== See also ==
- Guns N' Roses discography
- List of best-selling singles in the United States
- List of glam metal albums and songs
- List of Hot 100 number-one singles of 1988 (U.S.)
- List of UK Rock Chart number-one singles of 2010
