= Appetite for Destruction =

1987 studio album by Guns N' Roses

- CD and digital cover (Note: On the vinyl cover, the band name and album title are written sideways on the left and right.)

Studio album by Guns N' Roses
- Released: July 21, 1987
- Recorded: January 18 – June 23, 1987
- Studios: Rumbo (Canoga Park); Take One (Burbank); Record Plant (Los Angeles); Can Am (Los Angeles)
- Genres: Hard rock; heavy metal; glam metal
- Length: 53:52
- Label: Geffen
- Producer: Mike Clink

Guns N' Roses chronology
Live ?!*@ Like a Suicide (1986)	Appetite for Destruction (1987)	Guns N' Roses (1988)

Singles from Appetite for Destruction
- 1. "It's So Easy" / "Mr. Brownstone" Released: June 8, 1987; 2. "Welcome to the Jungle" Released: September 21, 1987; 3. "Sweet Child o' Mine" Released: June 3, 1988; 4. "Paradise City" Released: November 30, 1988; 5. "Nightrain" Released: July 1989

Alternative cover
- Original cover, which was replaced shortly after release

Appetite for Destruction is the debut studio album by American hard rock band Guns N' Roses, released on July 21, 1987, by Geffen Records. The album was recorded from January 18 to June 23 in 1987, and was produced by Mike Clink. Most of the album's themes reflect the band's personal experiences and daily life, including their youth.

Appetite for Destruction initially received little mainstream attention, and it was not until the following year that the album became a commercial success, after the band had toured and received significant airplay with the singles "Welcome to the Jungle", "Paradise City", and "Sweet Child o' Mine". The album went on to reach number one on the US Billboard 200 and spend four non-consecutive weeks there. It became certified 18× platinum, making it among the top 10 best-selling albums in the United States, as well as the best-selling debut album in the country.

In total, five singles were released from Appetite for Destruction: "It's So Easy" with "Mr. Brownstone", "Welcome to the Jungle", "Sweet Child o' Mine", "Paradise City", and "Nightrain". "Sweet Child o' Mine" would reach the top of the Billboard Hot 100, while "Welcome to the Jungle" and "Paradise City" would also reach the top 10 on the Hot 100.

Although critics were originally ambivalent toward the album, Appetite for Destruction has received retrospective acclaim and appears on lists as one of the best hard rock albums of the 1980s. With over 30 million copies sold, it is one of the best-selling albums worldwide. In 2018, it was re-released as a remastered box set to similar universal acclaim, hitting the top 10 of the Billboard 200 once again, over 30 years after the original album was released. The album was inducted into the Grammy Hall of Fame in 2024.

== Background ==
Guns N' Roses' first recordings were for a planned EP in March 1985, shortly after the band formed, with "Don't Cry", a cover of "Heartbreak Hotel", "Think About You" and "Anything Goes". However, plans for the release fell through, as original guitarist Tracii Guns left the band, being replaced by Slash. Shortly afterward, the classic lineup of Axl Rose, Duff McKagan, Slash, Steven Adler, and Izzy Stradlin was finalized.

After heavy touring of the Los Angeles club scene, the group signed with Geffen Records in March 1986. In December of that year, the group released the four-song EP Live ?!*@ Like a Suicide, which was designed to keep interest in the band alive while the group withdrew from the club scene to work in the studio. The EP release was also designed to soothe the label, which believed the band did not have enough songs to record a full-length album.

== Writing and recording ==
Rose stated many of the songs on the album were written while the band was performing on the Los Angeles club circuit, and a number of songs that were ultimately featured on later Guns N' Roses albums were considered for Appetite for Destruction, such as "Back Off Bitch", "You Could Be Mine", "November Rain", and "Don't Cry". It is said that the reason for not putting "November Rain" on Appetite for Destruction was that the band had already agreed to put "Sweet Child o' Mine" on the album, and thus already had a "ballad" on the track list.

Producer Spencer Proffer was hired to record "Nightrain" and "Sweet Child o' Mine" to test his chemistry with the band. The band eventually recorded nine songs with Proffer during these sessions, including "Heartbreak Hotel", "Don't Cry", "Welcome to the Jungle", and "Shadow of Your Love". In mid- to late-1986, the band recorded demos with Nazareth guitarist Manny Charlton, which were released in 2018 (see below for more info). The band initially considered Paul Stanley of Kiss to produce, but he was rejected after he wanted to change Adler's drum set more than Adler wanted. Robert John "Mutt" Lange was also considered, but the label didn't want to spend the extra money on a famous producer. Ultimately, Mike Clink (who had produced several Triumph records) was chosen, and the group recorded "Shadow of Your Love" first with Clink as a test.

After some weeks of rehearsal, the band entered Daryl Dragon's Rumbo Recorders in January 1987. Two weeks were spent recording basic tracks, with Clink splicing together the best takes. Clink worked eighteen-hour days for the next month, with Slash overdubbing in the afternoon and evening, and Rose performing vocals. Slash struggled to find a guitar sound, before coming up with a Gibson Les Paul copy equipped with Seymour Duncan Alnico II pickups and plugged into a Marshall amplifier. He spent hours with Clink paring down and structuring his solos. The total budget for the album was about $370,000. According to drummer Steven Adler, the percussion was done in just six days, but Rose's vocals took much longer, as he insisted on doing them one line at a time, and Rose's perfectionism drove the rest of the band away from the studio as he worked. Final overdubs and mixing were done at Mediasound Studios, and mastering at Sterling Sound in New York City.

Many of the songs on Appetite For Destruction began as solo tracks that individual band members began separately from the band, only to be completed later. These songs include "It's So Easy" (Duff McKagan) and "Think About You" (Izzy Stradlin). "Rocket Queen" was an unfinished Slash/McKagan/Adler song from their earlier band Road Crew, and "Anything Goes", written by Hollywood Rose and included on their compilation album The Roots of Guns N' Roses, was re-written for Appetite. Most of the songs reflect the band's personal experiences and daily life, such as "Welcome to the Jungle", some of the lyrics of which Rose wrote after he encountered a man in New York shortly after arriving there from Indiana in 1980, and "Mr. Brownstone", which is about the band's problems with heroin. Lyrics to some of the songs focus on the band members' younger years, like "Out ta Get Me", which focuses on lead singer Axl Rose's constant trouble with the law as a youth in Indiana.

In 1999, Rose decided to re-record the album with the then current lineup of Guns N' Roses (Rose, Robin Finck, Tommy Stinson, Paul Tobias, Josh Freese, Dizzy Reed, and Chris Pitman) to "spruce up" the album with new recording techniques. This re-recorded version of the album was never released, although the second half of the re-recorded version of "Sweet Child o' Mine" can be heard (following the first half of a live performance of the song) during the end credits of the 1999 film Big Daddy.

== Artwork ==
The album's original cover art was based on Robert Williams' painting Appetite for Destruction. It depicted a robotic rapist about to be punished by a metal avenger. After several music retailers refused to stock the album, some Geffen executives compromised and put the controversial cover art inside, replacing it with an image depicting a Celtic cross and skulls representing each of the five band members (top skull: Izzy Stradlin, left skull: Steven Adler, center skull: Axl Rose, right skull: Duff McKagan, and bottom skull: Slash). In a 2016 interview, Billy White Jr., who designed the tattoo with the cross and skulls upon which the album artwork was based, explained: "The cross and skulls that looked like the band was Axl's idea, the rest was me. The knot work in the cross was a reference to Thin Lizzy, a band Axl and I both loved." The original cover was supposed to be on the 2008 vinyl reissue of the album, though executives replaced it with the "skulls" art at the last minute. The photographs used for the back of the album and liner notes were taken by Robert John, Marc Canter, Jack Lue, Leonard McCardie, and Greg Freeman.

The band stated the original artwork was "a symbolic social statement, with the robot representing the industrial system that's raping and polluting our environment." In albums which were issued on double sided media (vinyl records and audio cassettes), the two sides were labeled "G" and "R", rather than the conventional "A" and "B". Tracks 1–6, which compose side "G", all deal with drugs and hard life in the big city ("Guns" side). The remaining tracks, which compose side "R", all deal with love, sex, and relationships ("Roses" side). In an interview with That Metal Show in 2011, Rose stated his initial idea was for the cover art to be the photo of the Space Shuttle Challenger exploding that was on the cover of Time magazine in 1986, but Geffen rejected the idea, saying it was "in bad taste".

== Marketing and sales ==
When Appetite for Destruction was released by Geffen Records on July 21, 1987, it received little notice from American press and radio, apart from some airplay in California. Music journalist Stephen Davis later attributed this to competing rock music in the mainstream at the time, including Aerosmith's comeback hit album Permanent Vacation, Def Leppard's presence on radio with their Hysteria album, and the dominance of U2's spiritual rock over MTV's prime-time viewership. The album debuted at number 182 on the Billboard 200 the week of August 29, but it only sold 200,000 copies in the first several months of its release, and Geffen planned on "walking away" from the record.

Radio stations originally did not want to play "Welcome to the Jungle", and MTV did not want to air the song's music video. However, after several months of lobbying the network, Geffen general manager Al Coury convinced MTV to play the video just once a night for three nights. "Welcome to the Jungle" became the most requested video on the network, and Coury pitched this success to radio stations, whom he sent promo copies of "Welcome to the Jungle", "Paradise City", and "Sweet Child o' Mine".

With the radio and video airplay, as well as the band's touring, Appetite for Destruction managed to top the Billboard 200 on August 6, 1988, over a year after it was released. It spent four non-consecutive weeks at number one and a total of 147 weeks on the chart. Slash recalled: "We thought we'd made a record that might do as well as, say, Motörhead. It was totally uncommercial. It took a year for it to even get on the charts. No one wanted to know about it."

From 1994 up to 2018, Appetite for Destruction sold 1,216,017 copies in the United Kingdom. By September 2008, the album had been certified 18× platinum by the Recording Industry Association of America (RIAA), having shipped over 18 million copies in the United States, making it the country's 11th best-selling album ever. According to Billboard in 2008, it is also the best-selling debut album of all time in the US. That year, Sky News reported the album's worldwide sales to be approximately 28 million copies, making it one of the best-selling albums of all time; by 2013, worldwide sales were estimated at nearly 31 million units to that point.

== Reception and legacy ==
Professional ratings
Review scores
Source	Rating
AllMusic	5/5 stars
Christgau's Record Guide	B−
The Encyclopedia of Popular Music	5/5 stars
Entertainment Weekly	A
MusicHound Rock	5/5 stars
Pitchfork	10/10
Rolling Stone	5/5 stars
The Rolling Stone Album Guide	5/5 stars
Spin	5/5 stars
Sputnikmusic	2/5

The album was not well received by contemporary American critics, many of whom complained that its massive success with consumers was fostered by the taboo of "sex, drugs and rock & roll" during the 1980s, when much of the cultural atmosphere in the US became informed by the Reagan-Bush Administration, the AIDS crisis, and the popularity of MTV. Writing in 1987, Dave Ling of Metal Hammer dismissed the album as an inferior mix of elements from bands such as Aerosmith, Hanoi Rocks, and AC/DC. Critics in the UK were more positive, and Kerrang! claimed that "rock is at last being wrestled from the hands of the bland, the weak, the jaded, the tired, the worn, and being thrust back into the hands of the real raunch rebels." However, the album was voted the 26th best album of the year in The Village Voice's 1988 Pazz & Jop, an annual poll of American critics nationwide. Robert Christgau, the poll's supervisor, was qualified in his praise when reviewing the album for his 1990 book Christgau's Record Guide: The '80s. While applauding Rose's "effortless, convincing vocal abilities" as "undeniable and [setting] him apart from his contemporaries", the journalist found his performance undermined by questionable lyrics that reveal darker ideas: "He doesn't love 'Night Train', he loves alcoholism. And once that sweet child o' his proves her devotion by sucking his cock for the portacam, the evil slut is ready for 'See me hit you you fall down.'"

In a retrospective review for The Rolling Stone Album Guide (2004), Ann Powers wrote that Guns N' Roses "produced a unique mix of different rock values", such as "speed and musicianship, flash and dirt", on an album that "changed hard rock's sensibilities at the time." Stephen Thomas Erlewine also viewed the album as a "turning point for hard rock" in his review for AllMusic, and felt Rose's singing and songwriting were enhanced by Slash and Stradlin's dual guitar playing, which helped make Appetite for Destruction "the best metal record of the late '80s". According to Jimmy Martin of The Quietus, the album, which he called "the greatest hard rock record of the 80s", has an "unrefined, punk quality" that marked a "shift away" from the hair metal bands commercialized by MTV. Christa Titus of Billboard said Appetite for Destruction was able to appeal to various rock music listeners because, on it, Guns N' Roses incorporated "metal's forceful playing, punk rock's rebellious themes, glam metal's aesthetic, and bluesy guitar riffs that appealed to purists." Russell Hall, the features writer for Gibson's online publication, said the album "injected a much-needed dose of '70s-style rebellion into the frothy pop metal of the '80s", by "combining the swagger of late '60s Stones and vintage Aerosmith with the menace of punk and a trash-glam aesthetic".

Writing for Pitchfork, Maura Johnston called the album "a watershed moment in '80s rock that chronicled every vice of Los Angeles led by the lye-voiced Axl Rose and a legendary, switchblade-sharp band." BBC Music's Dennis O'Dell said the engagingly hedonistic album remains the band's best, as did Ric Albano of Classic Rock magazine: "This band would never again reach this level of importance and breakthrough originality." In a 2000 list, Q named it one of the greatest metal albums ever and hailed it as "a riotous celebration of sex, drugs and rock'n'roll". Chuck Klosterman said the album would be the only pop metal album to make a theoretical list of rock's ten best albums, and Chuck Eddy, who called it "the greatest album ever made about how you can't run away from yourself", named it one of his essential hair metal records in Spin. On the other hand, Sputnikmusic said the album has been somewhat overrated, and most of the songs suffer by comparison to the highlights "Welcome to the Jungle", "Sweet Child o' Mine", "Paradise City", "Mr. Brownstone", and "Rocket Queen". In a retrospective review for the album's 30th Anniversary David Bennun in The Quietus commented on the album's "incipient cruelty and contempt...towards women" while still calling the album's first side "one of the most thrilling rushes rock & roll music has ever delivered"

=== Accolades ===
- In 1989, Rolling Stone ranked the album as the 27th best album of the 1980s. In 2012, it was ranked #62 on Rolling Stone's updated list of "The 500 Greatest Albums of All Time"; it maintained that rank on the 2020 update of the list.
- In 2001, Q magazine listed the album as one of "The 50 Heaviest Albums of All Time". In 2004, Q named it one of "The Greatest Classic Rock Albums Ever". In 2006, Q placed the album at #10 on its list of "The 40 Best Albums of the '80s".
- In 2002, Pitchfork ranked the album at #59 on their list of "The Top 100 Albums of the 1980s". It dropped to #86 on Pitchfork's 2018 list of "The 200 Best Albums of the 1980s".
- In 2003, VH1 named the album the 42nd "Greatest Album of All Time".
- In 2004, Kerrang! ranked the album as the #1 most "essential" hard rock album.
- In 2005, Spin ranked the album #18 on their list of "The 100 Greatest Albums, 1985–2005".
- In 2006, the album was included in the book 1001 Albums You Must Hear Before You Die.
- In 2007, the album was ranked #32 on the Rock and Roll Hall of Fame's list of "The Definitive 200 Albums", which was developed by the National Association of Recording Merchandisers (NARM).
- In 2011, Australian radio station Triple M listed the album #1 on their list of "The 250 Most Life Changing Albums".
- In 2012, Slant Magazine listed the album at #37 on their list of "The Best Albums of the 1980s".
- In 2012, Clash added the album to its Classic Albums Hall of Fame.
- In 2024, the album was inducted into the Grammy Hall of Fame.
- In 2024, Loudwire staff elected it as the best hard rock album of 1987.

== Track listing ==
=== Original release ===
All tracks are written by Guns N' Roses, except where noted.

'G' side
No.	Title	Writer(s)	Length
1.	"Welcome to the Jungle"		4:31
2.	"It's So Easy"	Guns N' Roses; West Arkeen	3:21
3.	"Nightrain"		4:26
4.	"Out ta Get Me"		4:20
5.	"Mr. Brownstone"		3:46
6.	"Paradise City"		6:46

'R' side
No.	Title	Writer(s)	Length
1.	"My Michelle"		3:39
2.	"Think About You"		3:50
3.	"Sweet Child o' Mine"		5:55
4.	"You're Crazy"		3:16
5.	"Anything Goes"	Guns N' Roses; Chris Weber	3:25
6.	"Rocket Queen"		6:13
Total length:			53:52

== Remastered version ==
Appetite for Destruction: Locked N' Loaded

Compilation album by Guns N' Roses
- Released: June 29, 2018
- Recorded: 1985–1988
- Studios: Rumbo Studios, Canoga Park; Take One Studio, Burbank; The Record Plant, Los Angeles; Can Am Studio, Tarzana
- Length: 127:08 (Deluxe); 211:25 (Super Deluxe)
- Label: Geffen
- Producers: Mike Clink; Manny Charlton

Guns N' Roses chronology
Appetite for Democracy 3D (2014)	Appetite for Destruction: Locked N' Loaded (2018)	Hard Skool EP (2022)

Singles from Appetite for Destruction: Locked N' Loaded
- 1. "Shadow of Your Love" Released: May 4, 2018

Alternative cover
- The contents of the Locked N' Loaded edition

On April 30, 2018, billboards appeared in several large cities and a website was launched with the tagline "Destruction Is Coming". The website was updated with a countdown clock to May 4, 2018, and a snippet of the Hollywood Rose song "Shadow of Your Love" playing. Journalist Mitch Lafon stated the campaign was for a deluxe edition of Appetite for Destruction. A video announcement was inadvertently released a day early, detailing the Appetite for Destruction: Locked N' Loaded edition, which was released June 29, 2018. The box set includes 73 songs (49 of which were previously unreleased) on four compact discs and seven 12-inch 180-gram LPs. It features remastered versions of Live ?!*@ Like a Suicide, an EP of b-sides, 25 recordings from the group's 1986 Sound City Studios sessions with producer Manny Charlton, and two previously unreleased tracks from the group's sessions with Mike Clink. Three of the four songs from the G N' R Lies EP are included, with the exception of the controversial "One in a Million", with Slash explaining it's omission had been a collective decision which didn't require a "big roundtable thing".

In addition to the music, this release included a 96-page book with unreleased photos from Rose's personal archive, 12 lithographs visualizing each song on the album, and assorted replica memorabilia. "Shadow of Your Love" was released as a single on May 4, 2018, making it the band's first single in almost a decade. The full Locked N' Loaded edition initially retailed for $999, but an edition that included the five discs and extras and standard editions with just the remastered album and bonus tracks were also made available. The Deluxe and Super Deluxe editions were also made available for streaming and paid download.

On May 21, 2018, the band released the unseen music video for "It's So Easy" on Apple Music. "Welcome to the Jungle" (1986 Sound City Session), "Move to the City" (1988 Acoustic Version), and "November Rain" (Piano Version, 1986 Sound City Session) were released as promotional singles in June, before the album's release. A hidden tape of the band's five-song 1985 Mystic Studios demo session is included as an easter egg in one of the drawers of the Locked N' Loaded edition.

A Pop-up shop was opened in London on the day of release, featuring Guns N' Roses themed drinks, a tattoo artist, merchandise, and a large screen showing the band's 1988 show at The Ritz. The remastered release resulted in Appetite for Destruction re-entering the top 10 of the Billboard 200 for the first time in 29 years.

=== Reception ===
Professional ratings
Aggregate scores
Source	Rating
Metacritic	95/100
Review scores
Source	Rating
AllMusic	Positive
Classic Rock	4.5/5 stars
Drowned in Sound	10/10
Kerrang!	5/5 stars
Mojo	4/5 stars
Q	4/5 stars
Record Collector	4/5 stars
Rolling Stone	4.5/5 stars
Slant Magazine	4.5/5 stars
Uncut	9/10

The box set received universal critical acclaim, with Metacritic scoring it 95 out of 100, based on nine reviews. It was nominated for a Grammy Award for Best Boxed Set, the band's first nomination since 1993 (it lost to Squeeze Box: The Complete Works of "Weird Al" Yankovic).

Most reviewers focused on the bonus material. Adam Davis of Record Collector found the remaster both heavier and more detailed, bringing the band's vocal harmonies forward, and said the 1986 Sound City recordings showed "an unbelievably tight unit"; he picked the piano demo of "November Rain" as worth the price on its own. Zachary Hoskins of Slant Magazine called the bonus discs the set's main selling point and wrote that some of the demos rock harder than the album versions, though a plodding "Nightrain" made him miss Mike Clink's polish. Hoskins also asked why "One in a Million" had been left off the B-sides disc. Marc Burrows of Drowned in Sound said the demos show how fully formed the songs were years before the album came out, and that Appetite still "packs a visceral thrill". Davis was less sold on the Locked N' Loaded edition, which he said cost almost ten times as much as the super deluxe set for extras such as lithographs, a bandana and rub-on tattoos.

=== Deluxe edition ===
All tracks are written by Guns N' Roses, except where noted.

Disc 1: Appetite for Destruction Remastered
No.	Title	Writer(s)	Length
1.	"Welcome to the Jungle"		4:33
2.	"It's So Easy"	Guns N' Roses; West Arkeen	3:22
3.	"Nightrain"		4:28
4.	"Out ta Get Me"		4:23
5.	"Mr. Brownstone"		3:48
6.	"Paradise City"		6:45
7.	"My Michelle"		3:39
8.	"Think About You"		3:51
9.	"Sweet Child o' Mine"		5:56
10.	"You're Crazy"		3:17
11.	"Anything Goes"	Guns N' Roses; Chris Weber	3:26
12.	"Rocket Queen"		6:13
Total length:			53:41

Disc 2: B-sides, EPs N' More
No.	Title	Writer(s)	Length
1.	"Reckless Life"	Axl Rose; Izzy Stradlin; Weber	3:21
2.	"Nice Boys" (Rose Tattoo cover)	Angry Anderson; Mick Cocks; Geordie Leach; Dallas "Digger" Royall; Peter Wells	3:02
3.	"Move to the City" (Live)	Stradlin; Weber; Daniel Nicolson (aka D.J.)	3:34
4.	"Mama Kin" (Aerosmith cover)	Steven Tyler	3:41
5.	"Shadow of Your Love" (Live)	Rose; Stradlin; Paul Tobias	3:03
6.	"Welcome to the Jungle" (1986 Sound City Sessions)		4:59
7.	"Nightrain" (1986 Sound City Sessions)		4:49
8.	"Out ta Get Me" (1986 Sound City Sessions)		4:01
9.	"Paradise City" (1986 Sound City Sessions)		5:34
10.	"My Michelle" (1986 Sound City Sessions)		4:21
11.	"Shadow of Your Love"	Rose; Stradlin; Tobias	3:05
12.	"It's So Easy" (Live at the Marquee Club London, 1987)	Guns N' Roses; Arkeen	3:54
13.	"Knockin' on Heaven's Door" (Bob Dylan cover; live at the Marquee Club London, 1987)	Bob Dylan	4:59
14.	"Whole Lotta Rosie" (AC/DC cover; live at the Marquee Club London, 1987)	Angus Young; Malcolm Young; Bon Scott	4:06
15.	"You're Crazy" (Acoustic Version)		4:25
16.	"Patience"		5:54
17.	"Used to Love Her"		3:13
18.	"Move to the City" (1988 Acoustic Version)	Stradlin; Weber; Nicolson	3:26
Total length:			1:13:27

=== Super Deluxe edition ===
The "Locked N' Loaded" edition and the "Super Deluxe" edition have the same musical contents. Disc one is the original album.

All tracks are written by Guns N' Roses, except where noted.

Disc 2: B-Sides N' EP's
No.	Title	Writer(s)	Length
1.	"Reckless Life"	Rose; Stradlin; Weber	3:21
2.	"Nice Boys"	Anderson; Cocks; Leach; Royall; Wells	3:02
3.	"Move to the City"	Stradlin; Weber; Nicolson	3:34
4.	"Mama Kin"	Tyler	3:41
5.	"Shadow of Your Love" (Live)	Rose; Stradlin; Tobias	3:03
6.	"You're Crazy" (Acoustic Version)		4:25
7.	"Patience"		5:54
8.	"Used to Love Her"		3:13
9.	"You're Crazy"		4:10
10.	"It's So Easy" (Live at the Marquee Club London, 1987)	Guns N' Roses; Arkeen	3:54
11.	"Knockin' on Heaven's Door" (Live at the Marquee Club London, 1987)	Dylan	4:59
12.	"Whole Lotta Rosie" (Live at the Marquee Club London, 1987)	A. Young; M. Young; Scott	4:06
Total length:			47:21

Disc 3: 1986 Sound City Session
No.	Title	Writer(s)	Length
1.	"Welcome to the Jungle"		4:59
2.	"Nightrain"		4:49
3.	"Out ta Get Me"		4:01
4.	"Paradise City"		5:34
5.	"My Michelle"		4:21
6.	"Think About You"		3:50
7.	"You're Crazy"		3:21
8.	"Anything Goes"	Guns N' Roses; Weber	4:35
9.	"Rocket Queen"		6:06
10.	"Shadow of Your Love"	Rose; Stradlin; Tobias	2:38
11.	"Heartbreak Hotel" (Elvis Presley cover)	Mae Boren Axton; Thomas Durden; Elvis Presley	4:36
12.	"Jumpin' Jack Flash" (The Rolling Stones cover)	Jagger–Richards; Bill Wyman	3:21
Total length:			52:11

Disc 4: 1986 Sound City Session N' More
No.	Title	Writer(s)	Length
1.	"Shadow of Your Love"	Rose; Stradlin; Tobias	3:05
2.	"Move to the City"	Stradlin; Weber; Nicolson	3:16
3.	"Ain't Goin' Down No More" (Instrumental Version)		3:30
4.	"The Plague"		0:54
5.	"Nice Boys"	Anderson; Cocks; Leach; Royall; Wells	2:58
6.	"Back off Bitch"	Rose; Tobias	4:39
7.	"Reckless Life"	Rose; Stradlin; Weber	2:45
8.	"Mama Kin"	Tyler	3:26
9.	"New Work Tune"		3:25
10.	"November Rain" (Piano Version)	Rose	10:18
11.	"Move to the City" (Acoustic Version)	Stradlin; Weber; Nicolson	3:41
12.	"You're Crazy" (Acoustic Version)		4:06
13.	"November Rain" (Acoustic Version)	Rose	5:00
14.	"Jumpin' Jack Flash" (Acoustic Version)	Jagger–Richards; Wyman	3:52
15.	"Move to the City" (1988 Acoustic Version)	Stradlin; Weber; Nicolson	3:26
Total length:			58:21

Hidden bonus cassette: 1985 Mystic Studio Session
No.	Title	Writer(s)	Length
1.	"Welcome to the Jungle"		4:52
2.	"Anything Goes"	Guns N' Roses; Weber	5:03
3.	"Don't Cry"	Rose; Stradlin	4:36
4.	"Back Off Bitch"	Rose; Tobias	4:46
5.	"Think About You"		3:58

A fifth disc is included: a Blu-ray disc with 96 kHz 24-bit 5.1 surround sound and stereo mixes (mixed by Elliot Scheiner and Frank Filipetti) of all of Appetite for Destruction, alongside bonus tracks "Shadow of Your Love", "Patience", "Used to Love Her", "You're Crazy", and "Move to the City" (1988 Acoustic version). In addition, this disc includes the music videos for "Welcome to the Jungle", "Sweet Child o' Mine", "Paradise City", and "Patience", and a previously unreleased video for "It's So Easy".

== Personnel ==
Credits are adapted from the album's liner notes.

=== Guns N' Roses ===
- W. Axl Rose – lead vocals, backing vocals, synthesizer on "Paradise City", percussion
- Slash – lead guitar, acoustic guitar, slide guitar, talk box
- Izzy Stradlin – rhythm guitar, lead guitar, backing vocals, percussion
- [Duff "Rose" McKagan – bass guitar, backing vocals
- Steven Adler – drums

=== Production ===
- Mike Clink – production, engineering
- Steve Thompson – mixing
- Michael Barbiero – mixing
- George Marino – LP, cassette mastering
- Barry Diament – CD mastering
- Dave Reitzas – assistant engineer
- Micajah Ryan – assistant engineer
- Andy Udoff – assistant engineer
- Jeff Poe – assistant engineer
- Julian Stoll – assistant engineer
- Victor Deyglio – assistant engineer
- Adriana Smith – background vocals on "Rocket Queen" (uncredited)
- Ted Jensen – boxed set mastering at Sterling Sound, New York City

=== Design ===
- Robert Williams – "Appetite for Destruction" painting
- Michael Hodgson – art direction and design
- Robert John – photography
- Jack Lue – photography
- Greg Freeman – photography
- Marc Canter – photography
- Leonard McCardie – photography
- Bill White Jr. – cross tattoo design
- Andy Engell – cross tattoo redrawing

== Charts ==
=== Weekly charts ===
Weekly chart performance for Appetite for Destruction
Chart (1987–2020)	Peak position
Australian Albums (ARIA)	7
Austrian Albums (Ö3 Austria)	3
Belgian Albums (Ultratop Flanders)	11
Belgian Albums (Ultratop Wallonia)	5
Canadian Albums (Billboard)	7
Canada Top Albums/CDs (RPM)	2
Dutch Albums (Album Top 100)	3
French Albums (SNEP)	25
German Albums (Offizielle Top 100)	2
Hungarian Albums (MAHASZ)	12
Irish Albums (IRMA)	7
Italian Albums (FIMI)	5
New Zealand Albums (RMNZ)	1
Norwegian Albums (VG-lista)	9
Polish Albums (ZPAV)	21
Scottish Albums (Official Charts)	5
Spanish Albums (Promusicae)	3
Swedish Albums (Sverigetopplistan)	12
Swiss Albums (Schweizer Hitparade)	5
UK Albums (Official Charts)	5
UK Rock & Metal Albums (Official Charts)	1
US Billboard 200	1
US Top Rock Albums (Billboard)	4
US Top Hard Rock Albums (Billboard)	1

Chart (2023–2025)	Peak position
Norwegian Rock Albums (IFPI Norge)	10
Portuguese Streaming Albums (AFP)	90
UK Album Downloads (Official Charts)	13

=== Year-end charts ===
Year-end chart performance for Appetite for Destruction
Chart (1988)	Position
Australian Albums (ARIA)	38
Canada Top Albums/CDs (RPM)	9
US Billboard 200	6

Chart (1989)	Position
Australian Albums (ARIA)	11
Canada Top Albums/CDs (RPM)	27
Dutch Albums (Album Top 100)	12
German Albums (Offizielle Top 100)	21
New Zealand Albums (RMNZ)	3
Swiss Albums (Schweizer Hitparade)	3
US Billboard 200	5

Chart (1992)	Position
German Albums (Offizielle Top 100)	63

Chart (2001)	Position
UK Albums (OCC)	182

Chart (2002)	Position
Canadian Albums (Nielsen SoundScan)	191
Canadian Metal Albums (Nielsen SoundScan)	31
UK Albums (OCC)	160

Chart (2003)	Position
UK Albums (OCC)	186

Chart (2016)	Position
Swedish Albums (Sverigetopplistan)	82

Chart (2017)	Position
Swedish Albums (Sverigetopplistan)	68

Chart (2018)	Position
Australian Albums (ARIA)	74
German Albums (Offizielle Top 100)	96
Icelandic Albums (Tónlistinn)	42
Spanish Albums (PROMUSICAE)	83
Swedish Albums (Sverigetopplistan)	50
US Top Rock Albums (Billboard)	43

Chart (2019)	Position
Australian Albums (ARIA)	83
Icelandic Albums (Tónlistinn)	61
Swedish Albums (Sverigetopplistan)	71
US Top Rock Albums (Billboard)	64

Chart (2020)	Position
Australian Albums (ARIA)	63
Belgian Albums (Ultratop Flanders)	187
Icelandic Albums (Tónlistinn)	81
Swedish Albums (Sverigetopplistan)	83
US Billboard 200	166
US Top Rock Albums (Billboard)	30

Chart (2021)	Position
Australian Albums (ARIA)	66
Belgian Albums (Ultratop Flanders)	185
Icelandic Albums (Tónlistinn)	61
Swedish Albums (Sverigetopplistan)	85
US Top Rock Albums (Billboard)	53

Chart (2022)	Position
Australian Albums (ARIA)	54
Icelandic Albums (Tónlistinn)	78
Swedish Albums (Sverigetopplistan)	94

Chart (2023)	Position
Australian Albums (ARIA)	86

Chart (2024)	Position
Australian Albums (ARIA)	99
Dutch Albums (Album Top 100)	100

Chart (2025)	Position
Dutch Albums (Album Top 100)	85
Swedish Albums (Sverigetopplistan)	95

== Certifications and sales ==
Region	Certification	Certified units/sales
Argentina (CAPIF)	3× Platinum	180,000^{^}
Australia (ARIA)	7× Platinum	490,000^{^}
Austria (IFPI Austria)	Platinum	50,000^{*}
Brazil (Pro-Música Brasil)	Platinum	250,000^{‡}
Brazil (Pro-Música Brasil) Super Deluxe Edition	Platinum	250,000^{‡}
Canada (Music Canada)	Diamond	1,000,000^{^}
Denmark (IFPI Danmark)	4× Platinum	80,000^{‡}
Finland (Musiikkituottajat)	Gold	25,000
France (SNEP)	2× Gold	200,000^{*}
Germany (BVMI)	Platinum	500,000^{^}
Italy sales in 1989	—	150,000
Italy (FIMI) since 2009	3× Platinum	150,000^{‡}
Japan (RIAJ)	Platinum	200,000^{^}
Mexico (AMPROFON)	Gold	100,000^{^}
Netherlands (NVPI)	Platinum	100,000^{^}
New Zealand (RMNZ)	5× Platinum	75,000^{‡}
Poland (ZPAV)	Gold	10,000^{‡}
Singapore (RIAS)	Gold	5,000^{*}
Spain (Promusicae)	Gold	50,000^{^}
Sweden (GLF)	Gold	50,000^{^}
Switzerland (IFPI Switzerland)	Platinum	50,000^{^}
United Kingdom (BPI)	9× Platinum	2,700,000^{‡}
United States (RIAA)	18× Platinum	18,000,000^{^}
^{*} Sales figures based on certification alone.^{^} Shipments figures based on certification alone.^{‡} Sales+streaming figures based on certification alone.

== See also ==
- List of best-selling albums
- List of best-selling albums in Argentina
- List of best-selling albums in the United Kingdom
- List of best-selling albums in the United States
- List of glam metal albums and songs
