= Shadow of Your Love =

Single by Guns N' Roses

from the album Appetite For Destruction: Super Deluxe edition
- B-side: "Move to the City" (1988 acoustic version)
- Released: May 4, 2018
- Recorded: November 23, 1986
- Genre: Speed metal
- Length: 3:06
- Label: Geffen, UMG
- Songwriters: Axl Rose; Izzy Stradlin; Paul Tobias
- Producer: Mike Clink

Guns N' Roses singles chronology
| "Chinese Democracy" (2008) | "Shadow of Your Love" (2018) | "Absurd" (2021) |

"Shadow of Your Love" is a song by the American hard rock band Guns N' Roses, originally released as a B-side in 1987 and in the Live From The Jungle EP in 1988. It was later released as a single in 2018, which entered at 31 on the Mainstream Rock chart in its May 12, 2018 edition, and peaked at No. 5 the week of June 23 the same year. It would later be included on the Super Deluxe version of Appetite for Destruction and in the 2020 re-issue of the band's Greatest Hits album.

== Background ==
"Shadow of Your Love" was written by Axl Rose and Izzy Stradlin from Hollywood Rose with help from Rose's friend Paul Tobias (Tobias later was a member of Guns N' Roses from 1994 until 2002). Rose mentioned being inspired by Thin Lizzy in writing the lyrics and wrote the song in "about 7 minutes".

The song was first recorded by Hollywood Rose, with an original demo and two remixes later being released on The Roots of Guns N' Roses compilation.

Steven Adler explained the background of the song: "The first song we played in rehearsal was 'Shadow of Your Love,' and Axl showed up late. We were playing the song, and right in the middle of the song Axl showed up and he grabbed the microphone and was running up and down the walls screaming. I thought, 'This is the greatest thing ever.' We knew right then what we had."

In 1998, former Hollywood Rose guitarist Chris Weber sued Rose over songwriting credits, claiming he co-wrote "Shadow of Your Love" (and "Back Off Bitch" from Use Your Illusion I).

== Release and promotion ==
The first Guns N' Roses version appeared as a B-side on the It's So Easy/Mr. Brownstone 12" single in 1987, as a "faux-live" version of the song, with overdubbed crowd noise on the studio track. The same version was also released in 1988 on the Live from the Jungle EP. This version of the track was an outtake from the band's debut EP, Live ?!*@ Like a Suicide.

A different recording of the song was released as a B-side on the "Live and Let Die" single in 1991, which is identical to the Sound City Session version later included on the Appetite for Destruction: Super Deluxe Edition.

In 2018, a previously unreleased version of the song was issued as a single to promote the Appetite for Destruction: Locked N' Loaded box set. It had been recorded at Rumbo Recorders on November 23, 1986, as a trial session for producer Mike Clink, which earned him the job of producing the album. The artwork for the single release was made by artist Arian Buhler. Buhler worked with the band previously on designing lithographs for the Not in This Lifetime... Tour. Two lyric videos were released in promotion of the single. The song is also included as 7" single in the Appetite for Destruction Locked N' Loaded Box Set, backed with the 1988 acoustic version of "Move to the City".

On June 6, 2018, the band played the song live for the first time since the Appetite for Destruction Tour.

== Track listing ==
7-inch vinyl
| No. | Title | Writer(s) | Length |
|---|---|---|---|
| 1. | "Shadow Of Your Love" | Rose; Stradlin; Tobias | 3:05 |
| 2. | "Move To The City" (1988 Acoustic Version) | Stradlin; Weber; Nicolson | 3:26 |

== Personnel ==
Guns N' Roses versions

- W. Axl Rose – lead vocals
- Slash – lead guitar
- Izzy Stradlin – rhythm guitar, backing vocals
- Duff "Rose" McKagan – bass guitar, backing vocals
- Steven Adler – drums, percussion

Hollywood Rose version

- Axl Rose - lead vocals
- Chris Weber - lead guitar
- Izzy Stradlin - rhythm guitar
- Steve Darrow - bass
- Johnny Kreis - drums

== Charts ==
| Chart (2018) | Peak position |
|---|---|
| US Mainstream Rock Airplay (Billboard) | 5 |
| US Hot Rock & Alternative Songs (Billboard) | 25 |
| US Rock & Alternative Airplay (Billboard) | 18 |
| Billboard Canadian Mainstream Rock | 10 |
