= Welcome to the Jungle =

1987 single by Guns N' Roses

- U.S. single picture sleeve

Single by Guns N' Roses

from the album Appetite for Destruction
- B-side: "Whole Lotta Rosie (live)" (UK) "Mr. Brownstone" (US)
- Released: September 21, 1987
- Recorded: 1987
- Genre: Glam metal; hard rock
- Length: 4:31
- Label: Geffen
- Songwriters: Slash; Axl Rose; Izzy Stradlin; Duff McKagan
- Producer: Mike Clink

Guns N' Roses singles chronology
"It's So Easy" and "Mr. Brownstone" (1987)	"Welcome to the Jungle" (1987)	"Sweet Child o' Mine" (1988)

Music video
- "Welcome to the Jungle" on YouTube

Audio sample
- file; help

"Welcome to the Jungle" is a song by American rock band Guns N' Roses, featured as the opening track on their debut album, Appetite for Destruction (1987). It was released as the album's second single initially in the UK in September 1987 then again in October 1988 this time including the US, where it reached number seven on the Billboard Hot 100 and number 24 on the UK Singles Chart.

On the 1987 release, the 7" was backed with a live version of AC/DC's "Whole Lotta Rosie", while the 12" also contained live versions of the band's debut single "It's So Easy" and Bob Dylan's "Knockin' on Heaven's Door". In 2009, "Welcome to the Jungle" was named the greatest hard rock song of all time by VH1. In 2015, Sleazegrinder of Louder included the song in his list of "The 20 Greatest Hair Metal Anthems of All Time", placing it second. In 2021, Rolling Stone listed "Welcome to the Jungle" at 491 on their "500 Greatest Songs of All Time" list.

== Background and composition ==
Axl Rose wrote the lyrics while visiting a friend in Seattle: "It's a big city, but at the same time, it's still a small city compared to L.A. and the things that you're gonna learn. It seemed a lot more rural up there. I just wrote how it looked to me. If someone comes to town and they want to find something, they can find whatever they want." Guitarist Izzy Stradlin summarizes the song as "about Hollywood streets; true to life".

Slash describes the development of the music in his self-titled autobiography. As the band was trying to write new material, Rose remembered a riff Slash had played while he was living in the basement of Slash's mother's house. He played it and the band quickly laid down the foundations for the song, as Slash continued coming up with new guitar parts. "It was really the first thing we all collaborated on…" the guitarist recalled. "In that whole 'discovering ourselves' period from '85 through '86 – when we were living together very haphazardly and getting together and jamming – there was something going on that not a lot of people had. And this song just had this natural feel that was very cool."

The breakdown was based on a song called "The Fake" that Duff McKagan wrote in 1978 for his punk band the Vains. The bassist said it was the first song he ever wrote, and that it was later released as a single by that band.

According to Slash, the song was written in approximately three hours.

Rose claimed the lyrics were inspired by an encounter he and a friend had with a homeless man while they were coming out of a bus into New York. Trying to put a scare into the young runaways, the man yelled at them, "You know where you are? You're in the jungle baby; you're gonna die!" "It was a very telling lyric – just the stark honesty of it," said Slash. "If you lived in Los Angeles – and lived in the trenches, so to speak – you could relate to it."

== Reception ==
"Welcome to the Jungle" was ranked number 19 in Martin Popoff's book The Top 500 Heavy Metal Songs of All Time. It was also named the second greatest metal song by VH1 in 2008. In 2006, VH1 also placed the song at number 26 on its list of the "100 Greatest Songs of the 80s" and, in 2009, the channel ranked it the greatest hard rock song of all time. It was ranked number 467 in Rolling Stone's "500 Greatest Songs of All Time" list in 2004, number 473 in 2010, and number 491 in 2021. (Rolling Stone readers named it "the greatest sports anthem" in 2009) and number 764 in Q's "1001 Best Songs Ever". Paste and Kerrang both named it Guns N' Roses' greatest song. It was named the "greatest song about Los Angeles" in a 2006 Blender poll.

"'Welcome to the Jungle' had this high velocity, high impact, aggressive delivery," Slash observed. "But there were a lot of emotional subtleties in the song that the band really grasped. If Axl went here, the band went with him. I really love that about the band and the music and how it all came together. There was something magical in all of that."

Cash Box called it a "solid, satisfying chunk of metal."

== Music video ==
Geffen Records was having a hard time selling the video to MTV. David Geffen made a deal with the network, and the video was aired only one time around 5:00AM on a Sunday morning. As soon as the video was aired, the networks received numerous calls from people wanting to see the video again.

In spite of the early morning airtime, the song's music video caught viewers' attention and quickly became MTV's most requested video. The video (directed by Nigel Dick) begins with a shot of Axl Rose disembarking a bus in Los Angeles and a drug dealer (portrayed by Izzy) is seen trying to sell his merchandise while Rose rejects it. As Rose stops to watch a television through a store window, clips of the band playing live can be seen and Slash can also be seen briefly, sitting against the store's wall and drinking from a clear glass bottle in a brown paper bag. By the end of the video, Rose has transformed into a city punk, wearing the appropriate clothing, after going through a process similar to the Ludovico technique.

During an interview with Rolling Stone magazine about the music video, Guns N' Roses' manager at the time, Alan Niven, said that he "came up with the idea of stealing from three movies: Midnight Cowboy, The Man Who Fell to Earth and A Clockwork Orange."

== Uses in TV, film and video games ==
The song has been used in numerous Hollywood films, as well as on television. Films that have used it include:

- The Dead Pool (1988)
- Lean on Me (1989)
- The Program (1993)
- Selena (1997)
- Megamind (2010)
- The Interview (2014)
- The Spongebob Movie: Sponge Out Of Water (2015)
- How to Be Single (2016)
- Jumanji: Welcome to the Jungle (2017)
- The Lego Ninjago Movie (2017)
- Jumanji: The Next Level (2019)
- 9-1-1 (Season 5 Episode 2) (2021)
- Thor: Love and Thunder (2022)

The song was used in the 2004 video game Grand Theft Auto: San Andreas on the in-game radio station Radio X, and was used in the second trailer for the game. "Welcome to the Jungle" is also a playable song in the 2007 video game Guitar Hero III: Legends of Rock; the band's then-former guitarist Slash also makes an appearance as a playable character in the game, who played himself, providing all motion capture recordings for his appearance.

It also serves as the unofficial anthem for the Cincinnati Bengals, whose stadium is nicknamed The Jungle.

Former professional baseball closer Éric Gagné used the song as his entrance music during his career.

== Track listings ==
All songs credited to Guns N' Roses except where noted

UK 1987 7" vinyl (GEF 30)
No.	Title	Writer(s)	Length
1.	"Welcome to the Jungle"		4:30
2.	"Whole Lotta Rosie" (Live AC/DC cover)	Angus Young, Malcolm Young, Bon Scott	5:29
Total length:			9:59

UK 1987 12" vinyl (GEF 30T)
No.	Title	Writer(s)	Length
1.	"Welcome to the Jungle"		4:30
2.	"Whole Lotta Rosie" (Live AC/DC cover)	Young, Young, Scott
3.	"It's So Easy" (live)	Guns N' Roses, West Arkeen
4.	"Knockin' on Heaven's Door" (Live Bob Dylan cover)	Bob Dylan

US 1988 7" vinyl (927 759-7)
No.	Title	Writer(s)	Length
1.	"Welcome to the Jungle"		4:30
2.	"Mr. Brownstone"	Izzy Stradlin	3:46
Total length:			8:17

UK 1988 7" vinyl (GEF 47)
No.	Title	Length
1.	"Welcome to the Jungle"	4:30
2.	"Nightrain"	4:29
Total length:		9:00

UK 1988 12" vinyl (GEF 47T) UK 1988 3" CD (GEF 47CD)
No.	Title	Length
1.	"Welcome to the Jungle"	4:30
2.	"Nightrain"	4:29
3.	"You're Crazy" (Acoustic Version)	4:23
Total length:		13:10

== Personnel ==
- W. Axl Rose – lead vocals
- Slash – lead guitar
- Izzy Stradlin – rhythm guitar, backing vocals
- Duff "Rose" McKagan – bass guitar, backing vocals
- Steven Adler – drums

== Charts ==
=== Weekly charts ===
Chart (1987–1989)	Peak position
Australia (ARIA)	41
Finland (Suomen virallinen lista)	13
Ireland (IRMA)	14
Netherlands (Single Top 100)	84
New Zealand (Recorded Music NZ)	6
UK Singles (Official Charts) 1987 release	67
UK Singles (Official Charts) 1988 release with "Nightrain"	24
US Billboard Hot 100	7
US Mainstream Rock Airplay (Billboard)	37

Chart (2008)	Peak position
Canadian Digital Song Sales (Billboard)	67

Chart (2018)	Peak position
Sweden Heatseeker (Sverigetopplistan)	18
US Hot Rock & Alternative Songs (Billboard)	17

Chart (2022)	Peak position
Hungary (Single Top 40)	22

=== Year-end charts ===
Chart (1989)	Position
US Billboard Hot 100	74

== Certifications ==
Region	Certification	Certified units/sales
Brazil (Pro-Música Brasil)	Platinum	60,000^{‡}
Denmark (IFPI Danmark)	Platinum	90,000^{‡}
Germany (BVMI)	Gold	250,000^{‡}
Italy (FIMI) sales since 2009	Platinum	50,000^{‡}
New Zealand (RMNZ)	4× Platinum	120,000^{‡}
United Kingdom (BPI)	2× Platinum	1,200,000^{‡}
United States (RIAA)	Gold	2,917,390
^{‡} Sales+streaming figures based on certification alone.

== See also ==
- List of glam metal albums and songs

== Bibliography ==
- Davis, Stephen (2008). Watch You Bleed: The Saga of Guns N' Roses. Gotham Books. ISBN 978-1-59240-377-6.
