= Axl Rose =

American singer and songwriter (born 1962)

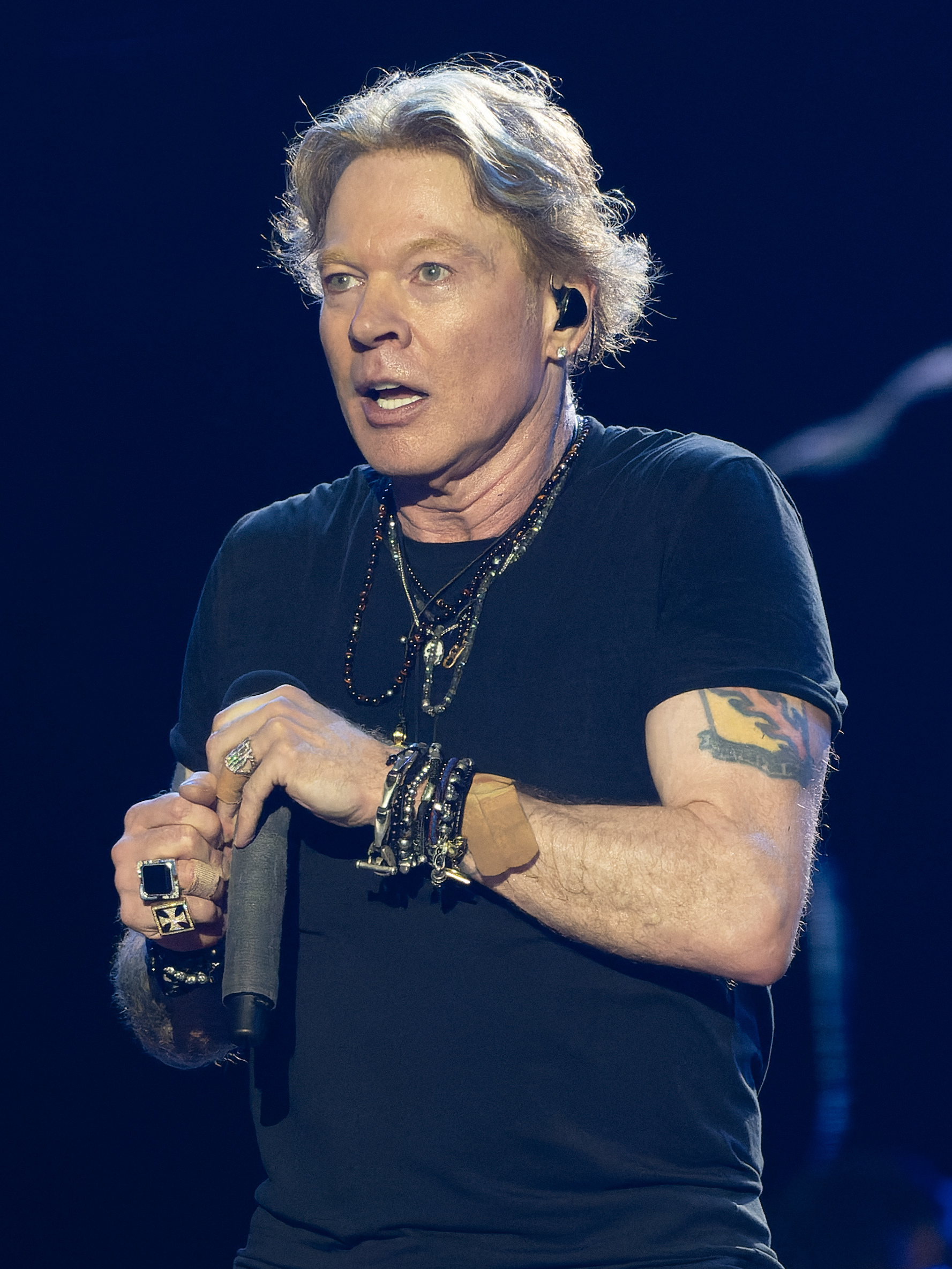
- Rose in 2023

Background information
- Also known as: W. Axl Rose; William Bruce Bailey; Bill Bailey
- Born: William Bruce Rose Jr. February 6, 1962 (age 64); Lafayette, Indiana, U.S.
- Origin: Los Angeles, California, U.S.
- Genres: Hard rock; heavy metal; blues rock; industrial rock
- Occupations: Singer; songwriter; musician
- Instruments: Vocals; piano
- Years active: 1983–present
- Member of: Guns N' Roses
- Formerly of: Hollywood Rose; L.A. Guns; Rapidfire; AC/DC
- Spouse: Erin Everly (m. 1990; ann. 1991)
- Website: axlrose.com

W. Axl Rose (/ˈæksəl/ AK-səl; born William Bruce Rose Jr., February 6, 1962) is an American singer, songwriter, and lead vocalist of the hard rock band Guns N' Roses. He has been the band's only constant member since its formation in 1985. Renowned for his wide-ranging, powerful voice, Rose has been ranked among the greatest singers of all time by outlets such as Rolling Stone, NME and Billboard.

Born in Lafayette, Indiana, Rose moved to Los Angeles in the early 1980s, joining bands like Hollywood Rose and L.A. Guns before co-founding Guns N' Roses. The band's debut album, Appetite for Destruction (1987), sold over 30 million copies worldwide and remains the best-selling U.S. debut. Rose's relationships with Erin Everly and Stephanie Seymour inspired multiple songs, including the chart-topping "Sweet Child o' Mine", though allegations of abuse, and controversial lyrics on "One in a Million" from the band's next release G N' R Lies (1988) drew criticism.

The twin albums Use Your Illusion I and II (1991), debuted at No. 2 and No. 1 on the Billboard 200, selling 35 million copies combined. Rose's volatile behavior during the Use Your Illusion Tour, with riots (including his arrest for inciting the Riverport Riot), media rants, and feuds with Metallica and Nirvana, fueled further controversy. The follow-up, "The Spaghetti Incident?" (1993), was less successful and drew backlash for including a cover of "Look at Your Game, Girl" by convicted murderer Charles Manson.

After the tour, Rose disappeared from the public eye while Guns N' Roses stalled on making a new album. Rose reemerged in 2001 with a new version of Guns N' Roses, eventually releasing Chinese Democracy (2008), the most expensive rock album ever produced. Inducted into the Rock and Roll Hall of Fame in 2012, Rose declined to attend. In 2016, he reconciled with classic Guns N' Roses members Slash and Duff McKagan for the record-breaking Not in This Lifetime... Tour, and toured with AC/DC as a fill-in vocalist for two dozen shows. The band continued touring and released singles into the 2020s.

== Early life ==
Axl Rose was born William Bruce Rose Jr. on February 6, 1962, in Lafayette, Indiana, the eldest child of Sharon Elizabeth (née Lintner), then 16, and William Bruce Rose, age 20. His father has been described as "a troubled and charismatic local delinquent," and the pregnancy was unplanned. The couple separated when Rose was around two years old. His father abducted and allegedly molested him before disappearing from Lafayette. Rose's mother later married Stephen L. Bailey and changed her son's name to William Bruce Bailey. He has two younger siblings: a sister, Amy, and a half-brother, Stuart. Stuart Bailey later played guitar in several Los Angeles bands and worked as a music supervisor in Hollywood.

Until age 17, Rose thought Bailey was his biological father. He never met William Rose Sr. as an adult; Rose Sr. was murdered in 1984 in Marion, Illinois, by a criminal acquaintance. Rose learned of the murder years later. Rose accused his stepfather of physically abusing the family and sexually abusing his sister.

The Bailey household was very religious. Rose attended a Pentecostal church multiple times per week and taught Sunday school. He later described the environment as oppressive, recalling: "We'd have televisions one week, then my stepdad would throw them out because they were Satanic... Women were evil. Everything was evil".

Music became a refuge. Rose sang in the church choir from age five and performed with his siblings as the Bailey Trio. At Jefferson High School, he joined the chorus and studied piano. A second baritone, he developed "different voices" during practice to confuse his teacher. He later formed a band with friends, including Jeff Isbell (later Izzy Stradlin), and befriended future musicians Shannon Hoon (Blind Melon) and Paul Tobias, who would co-write songs with Rose and join Guns N' Roses in the mid-1990s.

At 17, Rose discovered his birth name while reviewing insurance papers and began using W. Rose, avoiding "William" to distance himself from his biological father. The revelation marked a turning point. He became involved in delinquent behavior in Lafayette, was arrested more than 20 times, and served jail terms of up to three months. After being threatened with habitual offender charges, he moved to Los Angeles in December 1982.

== Career ==
=== 1983–1986: early years ===
Shortly after his arrival in Los Angeles, Rose met guitarist Kevin Lawrence outside The Troubadour in West Hollywood in March 1983 and joined his band Rapidfire. They recorded a five-song demo in May 1983 at Telstar Studios in Burbank, which, after years of legal action, was released as an EP, Ready to Rumble, in 2014.

After parting ways with Lawrence, he formed the band Hollywood Rose with his childhood friend Izzy Stradlin, who had moved to Los Angeles in 1980, and 16-year-old guitarist Chris Weber. Hollywood Rose was originally named AXL. Weber said it was Rose's idea to take the band's name for himself, but journalist Rob Tannenbaum says it was suggested by friends. (Rose would legally adopt the name W. Axl Rose prior to signing with Geffen Records in March 1986.) In January 1984, Hollywood Rose recorded a five-song demo featuring the tracks "Anything Goes", "Rocker", "Shadow of Your Love", and "Reckless Life", which was released in 2004 as The Roots of Guns N' Roses. Guitarist Slash and drummer Steven Adler, future members of Guns N' Roses, joined Hollywood Rose before the band's dissolution. Rose then joined L.A. Guns. While struggling to make an impact on the Hollywood music scene, Rose held down a variety of jobs, including the position of night manager at the Tower Records/Video location on Sunset Boulevard. Rose and Stradlin also smoked cigarettes for a scientific study at UCLA for the reported wages of $8 per hour (equivalent to $25 in 2025).

In March 1985, Rose and his former L.A. Guns bandmate Tracii Guns formed Guns N' Roses by merging their respective bands Hollywood Rose and L.A. Guns with Stradlin, drummer Rob Gardner and bassist Ole Beich. By June, after several lineup changes, the band consisted of Rose, lead guitarist Slash, rhythm guitarist Izzy Stradlin, bassist Duff McKagan, and drummer Steven Adler. The lineup debuted at The Troubadour and proceeded to play the L.A. club circuit, eventually building a devoted fan following. The band attracted the attention of several major record labels, before signing with Geffen Records in March 1986. The following December, they released the four-song EP Live ?!*@ Like a Suicide on the Geffen imprint UZI Suicide.

=== 1987–1989: breakthrough with Appetite for Destruction ===
Rose in 1987

In July 1987, Guns N' Roses released their debut album Appetite for Destruction. Although the record received critical acclaim, it experienced a modest commercial start, selling as many as 500,000 copies in its first year of release. However, fueled by the band's relentless touring, a grassroots campaign for the "Welcome to the Jungle" music video, and the mainstream success of the single "Sweet Child o' Mine", the album rose to the No. 1 position. To date, Appetite for Destruction has sold over 30 million copies worldwide, 18 million of which sold in the United States, making it the best-selling debut album of all time in the U.S.

During the band's performance at the Monsters of Rock festival in Castle Donington, England, in August 1988, two fans were crushed to death when many in the crowd of 107,000 began slam-dancing to "It's So Easy". Rose had halted the show several times to calm the audience. From then on, he became known for personally addressing disruptive fans and giving instructions to security personnel from the stage, at times stopping concerts to deal with issues in the crowd. In 1992, Rose stated, "Most performers would go to a security person in their organization, and it would just be done very quietly. I'll confront the person, stop the song: 'Guess what: You wasted your money, you get to leave.'" As a result of the deaths at Monsters of Rock, the festival was canceled the following year.

In November 1988, Guns N' Roses released the stopgap album G N' R Lies, which sold more than five million copies in the U.S. alone. The band – and Rose in particular – were accused of homophobia, nativism, and racism for the song "One in a Million", in which Rose used the slurs "nigger" and "faggots". During the controversy, Rose defended his use of the racial slur by referencing the rap group N.W.A and the John Lennon song "Woman Is the Nigger of the World" saying, "it's a word to describe somebody that is basically a pain in your life, a problem. The word nigger doesn't necessarily mean black." In 1992, however, he conceded that "I used a word that was taboo. And I used that word because it was taboo. I was pissed off about some black people that were trying to rob me. I wanted to insult those particular black people. I didn't want to support racism. When I used the word faggots, I wasn't coming down on gays." In response to the allegations of homophobia, Rose said he considered himself "pro-heterosexual" but is "not against [homosexuals] doing what they want to do as long as it's not hurting anybody else and they're not forcing it upon [him]". He blamed this attitude on "bad experiences" with gay men, citing an attempted rape in his late teens and the alleged molestation by his biological father. The controversy led to Guns N' Roses being dropped from the roster of an AIDS benefit show in New York organised by the Gay Men's Health Crisis.

With the success of Appetite for Destruction and G N' R Lies, Rose found himself lauded as one of rock's most prominent frontmen. By the time he appeared solo on the cover of Rolling Stone in August 1989, his celebrity was such that the influential music magazine agreed to his absolute requirement that the interview and accompanying photographs would be provided by two of his friends, writer Del James and photographer Robert John. MTV anchorman Kurt Loder described Rose as "maybe the finest hard rock singer currently on the scene, and certainly the most charismatic".

=== 1990–1993: international success with Use Your Illusion ===
In early 1990, Guns N' Roses returned to the studio to begin recording the full-length follow-up to Appetite for Destruction. Recording sessions initially proved unproductive due to Steven Adler's struggle with drug addiction, which made him unable to perform and caused sessions to be delayed for several days at a time. Adler was fired the following July and replaced by Matt Sorum of the Cult. Keyboardist Dizzy Reed also joined the band that year at Rose's insistence. Sorum and Reed played their first show with Guns N' Roses at Rock in Rio 2 in January 1991. The group fired its long-time manager, Alan Niven, in May of that year; Rose reportedly forced the dismissal of Niven against the wishes of his bandmates by refusing to complete the new album until Niven was gone. He was replaced by roadie Doug Goldstein, whom Izzy Stradlin described as "the guy who gets to go over to Axl's at six in the morning after he's smashed his $60,000 grand piano out of the picture window".

In May 1991, still without an album to promote, the band embarked on the two-and-a-half-year Use Your Illusion Tour, which became known for its financial success and myriad controversial incidents that occurred during shows, including late starts, on-stage rantings and even riots. Rose received much criticism for his late appearances at concerts, sometimes taking the stage hours after the band was scheduled to perform. In July 1991, 90 minutes into a concert at the Riverport Amphitheater near St. Louis, after on-stage requests from Rose for security personnel to confiscate a fan's video camera, Rose himself dived into the crowd to seize it. After being pulled back on stage, he announced, "Well, thanks to the lame-ass security, I'm going home!" and departed, following which some 2,500 fans staged a riot, resulting in an estimated $200,000 in damages.

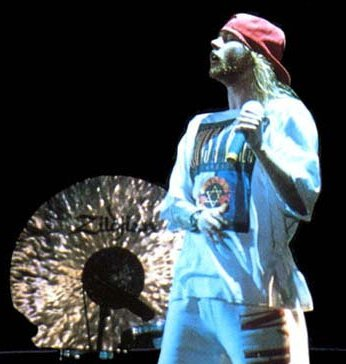
Rose at Yarkon Park in Tel Aviv, Israel, in May 1993

In September 1991, with enough material completed for two albums, Guns N' Roses released Use Your Illusion I and Use Your Illusion II, which debuted at No. 2 and No. 1 respectively on the Billboard 200, a feat not achieved by any other group. By the albums' release, however, Rose's relationships with his bandmates had become increasingly strained. His childhood friend Izzy Stradlin abruptly left the group in November 1991; he was replaced by Gilby Clarke of Kill For Thrills. Of his reasons for leaving, Stradlin said, "I didn't like the complications that became such a part of daily life in Guns N' Roses," citing the riot and Rose's chronic lateness as examples, as well as his new-found sobriety making it difficult to be around other bandmates' continued alcohol and substance abuse. On April 20, 1992, Rose performed with Elton John at The Freddie Mercury Tribute Concert at Wembley Stadium singing "Bohemian Rhapsody" as a duet with John and sang "We Will Rock You".

Another riot occurred in August 1992 at Montreal's Olympic Stadium, during a co-headlining tour with Metallica. Prior to Guns N' Roses' appearance, Metallica's set was cut short after singer-guitarist James Hetfield suffered second-degree burns in a pyrotechnics accident. However, the shortened time between sets did not allow for adequate tuning of stage monitors, and the band members could not hear themselves. In addition, Rose claimed that his throat hurt, causing the band to collectively leave the stage early. The riot resulted in an estimated $400,000 in damages. In November of that year, Rose was convicted of property damage and assault in relation to the Riverport riot; he was fined $50,000 and received two years' probation.

Guns N' Roses played its final show of the Use Your Illusion Tour on July 17, 1993, at River Plate Stadium in Buenos Aires; it proved to be Rose's last live performance with the band for seven and a half years. The following August, Rose testified in court against Steven Adler, who had filed a lawsuit contending that he had been illegitimately fired. When the judge ruled against Rose, he agreed to an out-of-court settlement of $2,500,000 and 15% of the royalties for everything Adler recorded prior to his departure. In November of that year, Guns N' Roses released "The Spaghetti Incident?", a cover album of mostly punk songs, which proved less successful than its predecessors. Rose had included the hidden track "Look at Your Game, Girl", a song written by convicted murderer Charles Manson, which he intended as a personal message to his ex-girlfriend Stephanie Seymour. Controversy ensued, and the band subsequently pledged to donate any royalties to the son of one of Manson's victims.

=== 1994–2000: hiatus ===
Without consultation from his bandmates, Rose did not renew Gilby Clarke's contract with the band in June 1994, as he claimed Clarke to be only a "hired hand". Tension between Rose and Slash reached a breaking point after the latter discovered that Rose had hired his childhood friend Paul "Huge" Tobias as Clarke's replacement. Although the band recorded material during this time, it was ultimately not used because, according to Rose, their lack of collaboration prevented them from producing their best work. Roses' final public performance until 2001 was covering The Beatles song "Come Together" alongside Bruce Springsteen in January 1994 at the Rock and Roll Hall of Fame induction ceremony.

In August 1995, Rose legally left the band and created a new partnership under the band's name, a step he said he took "to salvage Guns not steal it". Rose reportedly purchased the full rights to the Guns N' Roses name in 1997. Slash claimed he and other bandmates signed away rights to the name before the July 5, 1993, show in Barcelona, Spain with Axl delivering an ultimatum: they had to sign the name over to him or he would not perform. (In 2008, however, Rose said Slash's claims were false and that the alleged coercion would have rendered the contract legally untenable.)

Slash finally left Guns N' Roses in October 1996 due to his differences with Rose, while Matt Sorum was fired in June 1997 after an argument over Tobias's involvement in the band. Duff McKagan departed the band in August of that year, leaving Rose and Dizzy Reed as the only remaining band members of the Use Your Illusion era.

As the stability of Guns N' Roses collapsed, Rose withdrew from public view. The band never officially broke up as Rose continued to recruit new musicians to replace band members who either left or were fired. By the late 1990s, he was considered to be a recluse, rarely making public appearances and spending most of his time in his mansion in Malibu. In various media reports, he was referred to as the "Howard Hughes of rock" and "rock's greatest recluse". Rose was said to spend his nights writing and rehearsing with the various new lineups of Guns N' Roses, working on the band's next album, Chinese Democracy.

=== 2001–2011: touring in support of Chinese Democracy ===
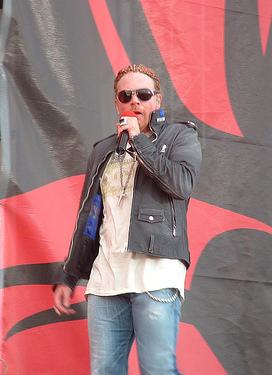
Rose at the Download Festival in Donington Park, England, in June 2006

A few weeks after a warmup show in Las Vegas, Rose resurfaced with Guns N' Roses at Rock in Rio 3 on January 14, 2001, to commence the decade-long Chinese Democracy Tour. A surprise appearance at the 2002 MTV Video Music Awards was followed by an incident in November when a riot erupted at Vancouver's General Motors Place after Rose failed to show up for a scheduled concert. When venue staff announced the cancellation, a riot broke out, resulting in an estimated $100,000 in damages. The riot led to the tour's cancelation by the promoter Clear Channel.

After the promoter canceled the tour, Rose again withdrew from public view. During this time, he joined Slash and Duff McKagan in a lawsuit against Geffen Records in an unsuccessful attempt to block the release of the Greatest Hits compilation album, and lent his voice to the 2004 video game Grand Theft Auto: San Andreas, as the DJ for the radio station, K-DST. In a rare interview in January 2006, Rose said "People will hear music this year." While Guns N' Roses toured extensively throughout 2006 and 2007, with several guest appearances by Izzy Stradlin, Chinese Democracy again failed to materialize. As the band's lineup continued to evolve, his constant bandmates were guitarist Richard Fortus, bassist Tommy Stinson, and keyboardists Dizzy Reed and Chris Pitman. Rose collaborated with his friend Sebastian Bach on his album Angel Down in 2007.

Fifteen years after its last album, in November 2008, Guns N' Roses released Chinese Democracy. The protracted development of the album cost $13 million, making it the most expensive rock album of all time. It received generally favorable reviews but undersold industry expectations. Rose did not contribute to the album's promotion; by December, he had reportedly been missing for at least two months and had not returned phone calls or other requests from his record label. In a subsequent interview, Rose said he felt he had not received the necessary support from Interscope Records. A year after the album's release, in December 2009, Guns N' Roses embarked on another two and a half years of touring, including a headlining performance at Rock in Rio 4.

=== 2012–present: Hall of Fame and regrouping; AC/DC ===
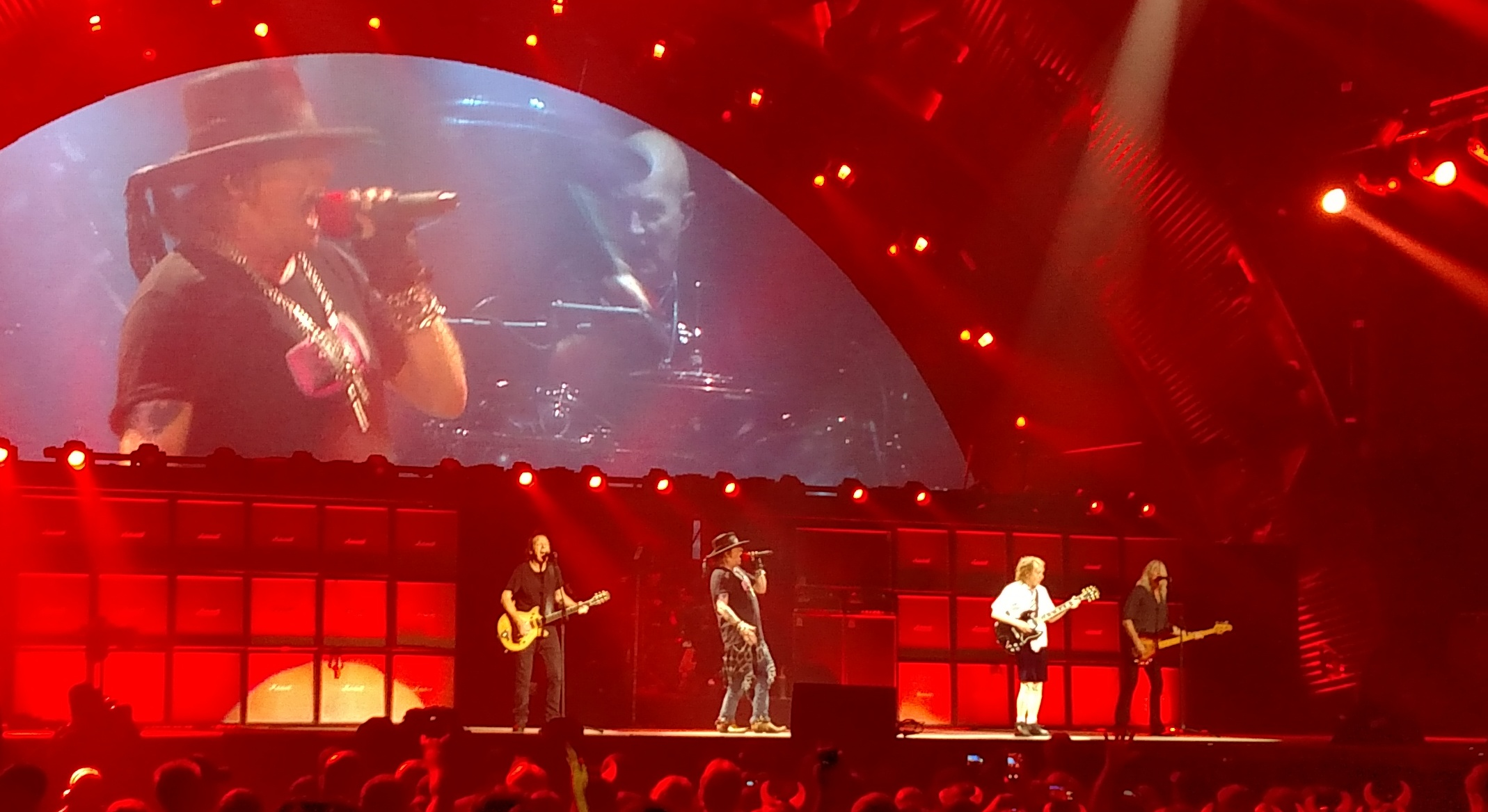
Rose performing with AC/DC in 2016

Together with the other members of Guns N' Roses' classic lineup, Rose was inducted into the Rock and Roll Hall of Fame in 2012, their first year of eligibility. He did not attend the induction ceremony in April, however, as he had announced in an open letter three days prior. Rose, who had long been on bad terms with several of his former bandmates, wrote that the ceremony "doesn't appear to be somewhere I'm actually wanted or respected". He subsequently joined his band in residencies at The Joint in Las Vegas in 2012 and 2014, as part of the Appetite for Democracy Tour celebrating the anniversaries of Appetite for Destruction and Chinese Democracy. By mid-2014, the group's new album, recorded concurrently with Chinese Democracy, and a remix album were completed and pending release, but no new material emerged.

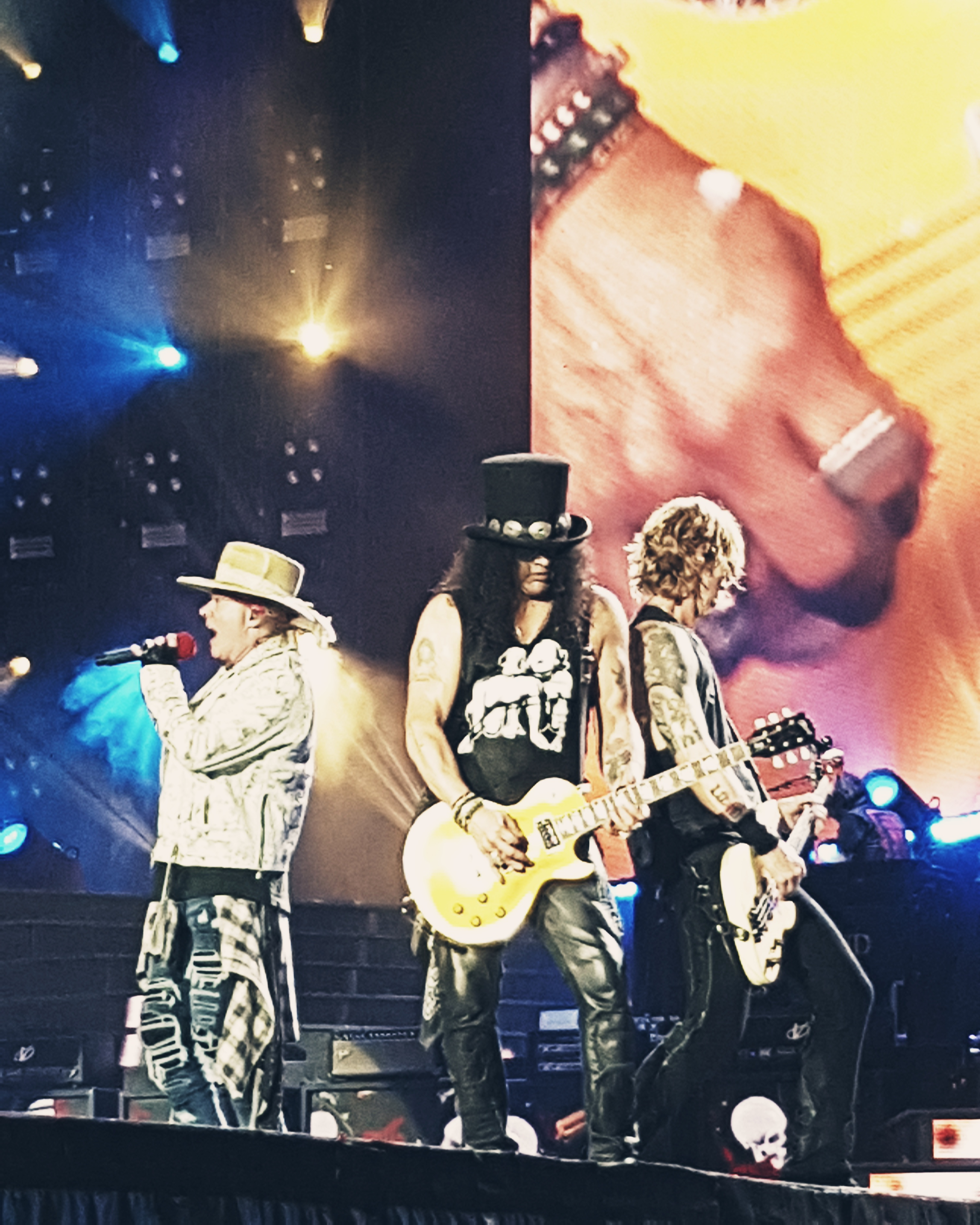
Rose (left) alongside Slash (center) and Duff McKagan (right) performing with Guns N' Roses in 2018

In early 2016, Rose and Slash reunited for the Not in This Lifetime... Tour, one of the most-anticipated reunion tours in rock history. Alongside Dizzy Reed and returning member Duff McKagan, who had previously made guest appearances with the band, they comprised two-thirds of the band's Use Your Illusion-era lineup, with Chinese Democracy-era members Richard Fortus and Frank Ferrer joining new member Melissa Reese to fill in the rest of the lineup. Rose shared a stage with Slash for the first time in nearly 23 years during the group's surprise performance at The Troubadour in April 2016, ahead of its headlining shows at Coachella. The tour was a massive success, and became the third highest-grossing concert tour of all time at the time of its conclusion.

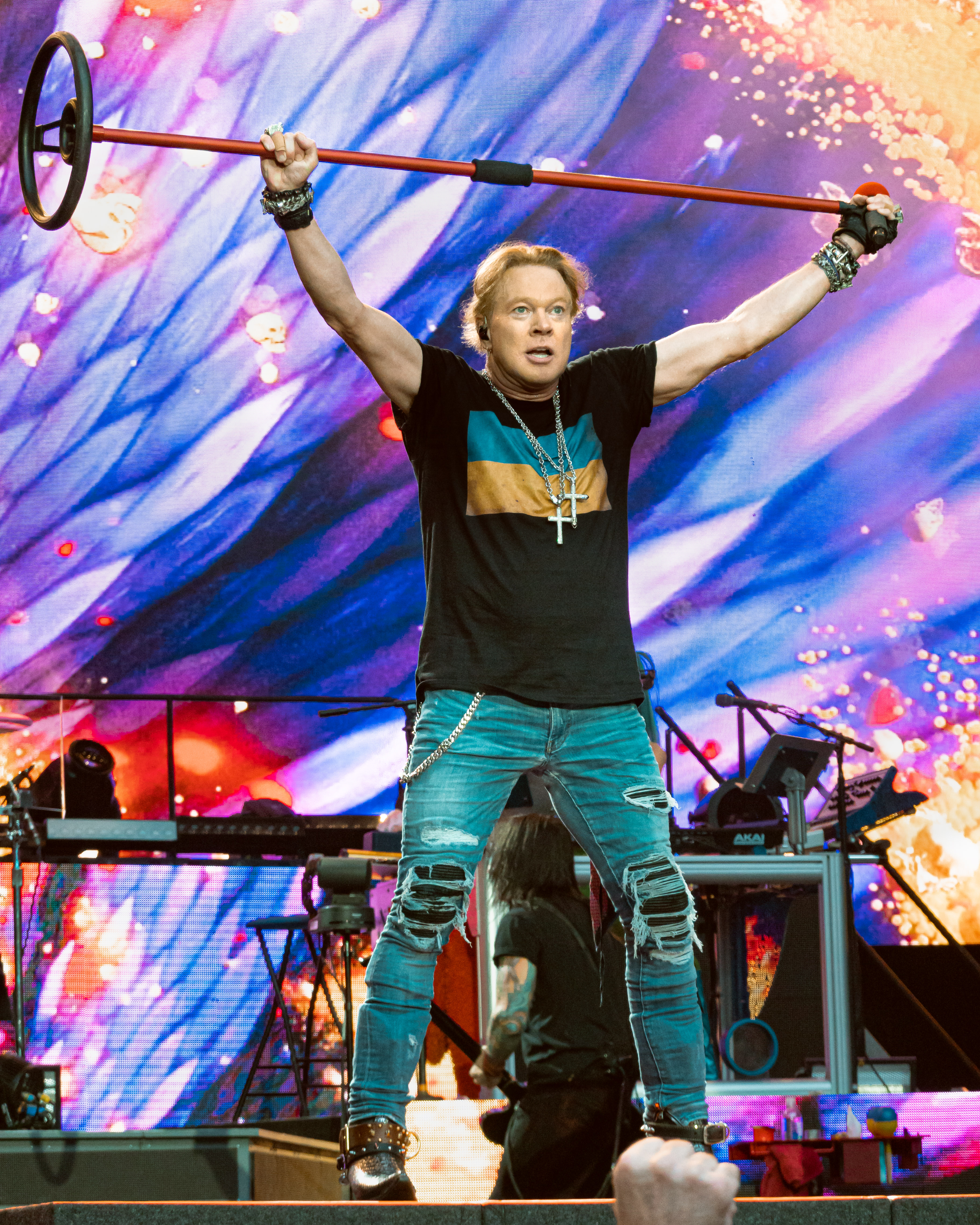
Rose performing in London in 2022.

On April 16, 2016, Australian hard rock band AC/DC announced that Rose would be joining them and performing as the lead singer for the remainder of the band's Rock or Bust World Tour, after long-time lead vocalist Brian Johnson had to stop touring due to hearing problems. Subsequent reports indicated that guitarist Angus Young would be continuing the band with Rose as its official lead singer. This did not happen however; on September 30, 2020, AC/DC officially announced that Brian Johnson, along with Phil Rudd and Cliff Williams had returned to the band in 2018 and recorded an album, showing that Rose only stepped in to help finish the tour and that he was never brought in to replace Johnson.

In 2018, Rose appeared in an episode of New Looney Tunes as himself, singing an original song "Rock the Rock". In 2021, Rose again appeared as himself in a cartoon, this time Scooby-Doo and Guess Who?.

Rose and Guns N' Roses continued touring after the Not In This Lifetime... Tour, with the Guns N' Roses 2020 Tour. The group released two singles in 2021, "Absurd" and "Hard Skool", the first release of newly recorded material since 2008. "Hard Skool" was heavily praised in comparison to "Absurd"; both songs feature vocals recorded in 1999.

In 2023, Rose and the band released the two singles, "Perhaps" and "The General", with a music video of the latter released on YouTube on January 24. In addition, they performed live in Indio, California, at Coachella in October as part of the 2023 tour and had their first headlining slot at Glastonbury Festival. The band continued touring in 2025.

In September 2025, Sumerian Comics announced Rose would write a new graphic novel with Nathan Yocum titled Axl Rose: Appetite For Destruction. Yocum described it as a "raw, neon-noir fever dream, part rock anthem, part cyberpunk prophecy".

In December 2025, Rose and the band released two singles, "Nothin'" and "Atlas", to promote a 2026 World Tour. In September 2026, Rose was planning to perform "Red Swan" with Japanese rock star Yoshiki at the Global Citizen Festival in New York City, but the event was canceled due to extreme weather. In 2026, Rose helped mentor country musician Carrie Underwood as she prepared to release her first rock album.

== Artistry ==
=== Influences ===
Rose has said that his earliest musical influences were gospel music, which he sang in his family's church, and Elvis Presley. As a pianist, he was drawn to the piano-led songs of Elton John and Billy Joel, and said he learned Elton John's sheet music by ear and simplified the left-hand parts into octaves. He credited Queen with combining technique and rock and roll, and said that when he started singing hard rock he was strongly drawn to Dan McCafferty of Nazareth, saying, "If it wasn't for Dan McCafferty and Nazareth I wouldn't be singing. I used to lock myself in the bathroom and try to hit those notes in Love Hurts, ya know". Duff McKagan recalled that Rose was into Nazareth, Queen and the Ramones when they met.

Rose said he wrote the lyrics of "Shadow of Your Love" with Thin Lizzy in mind. Slash described Hanoi Rocks as another influence on Rose. His orchestral-style writing on the Use Your Illusion I and II albums was influenced by the Electric Light Orchestra, Elton John, and Queen, particularly their album Queen II. By the early 1990s he counted U2 among his favorite bands.

In the early 1990s, Rose became a fan of electronica and industrial music, particularly the works of Nine Inch Nails, which influenced him during the development of Chinese Democracy. He also cited the U2 and Brian Eno collaboration Original Soundtracks 1 as a major influence. In a 2016 interview, Rose named Freddie Mercury, Elvis Presley, Paul McCartney, Dan McCafferty, Janis Joplin, Michael Jackson, Elton John, Roger Daltrey, Don Henley, Jeff Lynne, Johnny Cash, Frank Sinatra, Jimmy Scott, Etta James, Fiona Apple, Chrissie Hynde, Stevie Wonder, and James Brown among his favorite singers, and later called Queen his favorite band and Freddie Mercury his favorite singer.

=== Songwriting, musicianship and style ===
Rose writes the lyrics and vocal melodies for most Guns N' Roses songs. Slash called him the band's "word master and melody maker" in 1990, said Rose could take a simple melodic structure from Stradlin and turn it into a complete song, and in 1991 called him "the best singer-lyricist around". Adler wrote that Rose's early lyrics captured the band members' own lives and that nobody sang with more intensity. Rose has said that songs often arrive in fragments, that the piano ballads were the songs that mattered most to him, and that he plays guitar only on the top two strings; he wrote "One in a Million" at the apartment of co-writer West Arkeen.

Rose is a pianist who took lessons as a child but said he mostly made up his own pieces and could play only his own songs. He plays piano on "November Rain" in concert and has played guitar on "Dead Horse" at some shows. According to Rolling Stone, he composed Chinese Democracy material at the piano, and guitarist Zakk Wylde said there were rarely complete melodies at rehearsals. Rose said in 1999 that he wrote the vocals for that album last, after pushing the music as far as it could go, whereas he wrote many of the Appetite lyrics before the music; in 2011 he said Appetite was the only album written with lyrics and melody fitting the guitar parts at the same time, and that he wanted to lean more toward lyrics and melody.

=== Voice ===
Rose has said that he began singing at five in his family's Pentecostal church, and he loved working out harmonies, once getting in trouble in choir practice for singing everyone else's parts. He has described himself as a second baritone who widened his range to reach a higher register. Marc Canter wrote that Rose had initially sung in a smooth baritone, and Weber claimed to have encouraged him to use his high voice, though he later said Rose might have developed it in his earlier band Rapidfire. Slash, who first heard Rose on a demo tape as a squeal so high he took it for a flaw in the recording, later described the voice as versatile, with a bluesy natural rhythm beneath its high shrieking, Slash said Rose was the only singer he had worked with who brought emotional content that affected him on an emotional level, and McKagan recalled that Rose's first scream sounded like two voices coming out at once and was "pure rage and anguish" rather than operatic technique. Rose said in 1987 that he sang in five or six different voices on the band's debut, and in a 1992 interview that he tries to sing each line by recalling the emotions or childhood memories it relates to.

Rose said that cocaine would put his voice out of commission for a week, and bandmates said he avoided drinking, smoking, and drugs to protect it. Slash described him as very health-conscious in 1991, and McKagan said that year that Rose was probably the most physically together of the band. Sebastian Bach said that Rose has used his vocal warm-up routine for about 15 years, and after the death of his vocal coach Ron Anderson in 2021, Rose thanked him for "saving my career".

Rose's live voice drew uneven reviews after the band's return in the 2000s. Kerrang! later described the band's 2006 Download and 2010 Reading festival sets as examples of Rose's unfocused energy producing "shitshows". After his 2016 stint fronting AC/DC, however, he received generally good reviews, and Alice in Chains singer William DuVall said he had silenced doubters. AC/DC drummer Chris Slade said Rose hit "unbelievable" notes, and Slash said he was "blown away" by the performances. McKagan said that Rose, who sang the early reunion shows sitting down after breaking his foot, had become a vocal "master" through hard work, retaining the dual-voice effect he had had from the start. Men's Journal said in 2026 that Rose's voice at concerts had garnered mixed reviews, noting that at 64, Rose was still singing three hour shows.

=== Performance and stage persona ===
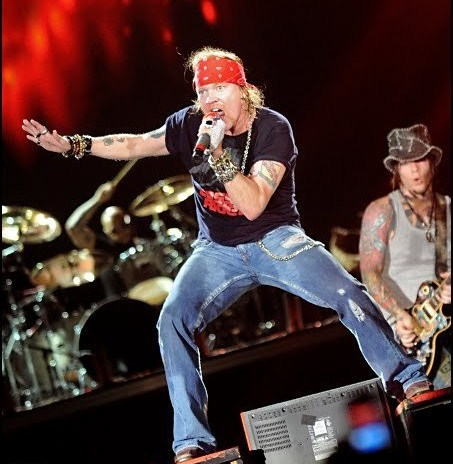
Rose in 2010.

Rose has said that Guns N' Roses is "like a living organism" and that his movements during "Mr. Brownstone" are how he gets the most out of himself without giving up his life, and in a 1992 interview he said he preferred moving around to sitting at the piano for "Estranged" in concert because it kept the energy up. McKagan wrote that Rose's unpredictability gave the band a sense of danger, with an audience watching him "light up the stage" one moment and facing a threat the next. Bach compared the "danger" in Rose's performances to that of Jim Morrison, Adler called him a "truly great performer", Slash said he had the star power that threatens authority figures, and Paul Elliott, recalling a 1987 Hollywood show, described him as a "full-on screamer" with a menacing intensity. A December 2011 Los Angeles Times article noted that Rose, then 49, sprinted from side to side across the stage over three hours and sat at the piano for "November Rain".

Rose has long spoken to audiences between songs. Early bandmate Tracii Guns recalled that by 1985 Rose was talking to the crowd for as long as five minutes between songs, which Guns and Stradlin tried to discourage and Rose defended as something the audience liked, and said the band had turned into a podium for Rose to speak on stage, cutting sets from twelve songs to six. Slash wrote that when Rose started telling a story he was as long-winded as Mark Twain, calling it a "Twain wreck", and that Rose was "a good talker".

On preparation, Rose said he did "a lot of cardio" before shows. McKagan said in 2019 that Rose did about an hour and a half of vocal warm-ups before shows and the same of warm-down afterward.

=== Image ===
Rose has described clothing as part of his art, telling Rolling Stone in 1989 that he expressed himself through it and that he wore a headband because his hair got in his face; the bandana, often red, became a trademark. Adler recalled that before a 1988 MTV taping Rose refused to go on stage until he found a bandana, settling on a powder-blue scarf. His early stage wear also included very short white shorts, and he was also known for wearing a kilt. In late 1991, Rose grew facial hair, and in the mid-2000s he wore his hair in cornrows, a look associated with the Chinese Democracy period; by 2011 he had dropped them and wore a handlebar mustache.

=== Videos and filmmaking ===
Rose took an active creative role in Guns N' Roses' music videos. After "Welcome to the Jungle" helped break the band, he worked with director Andy Morahan on the Use Your Illusion trilogy of "Don't Cry", "November Rain" and "Estranged", which loosely adapted Del James's short story "Without You". Morahan said he worked with Rose and Slash on the concept and described the story as never fully fleshed out; Slash said the videos were Rose's "brainchild" and that he was uninterested in concept videos. Rose insisted that the cake-jump scene in the "November Rain" video be kept after Morahan had cut it. Rose, Morahan and James were also invited to collaborate on an episode of the HBO series Tales from the Crypt.

=== Legacy and critical assessment ===
a depiction of Rose on a graffiti mural in Brazil. From left to right: Bob Marley, Axl Rose, Steven Tyler, Ozzy Osbourne, and Amy Winehouse.

Rolling Stone ranked Rose number 64 on its 2008 list of the 100 greatest singers of all time and number 134 on its 2023 list of the 200 greatest. Hit Parader placed him 11th on its 2006 list of "Heavy Metal's All-Time Top 100 Vocalists". Consequence named Rose 29th on their list of "100 Greatest Singers" in 2019. Billboard ranked Rose 10th on their list of "50 Greatest Rock Lead Singers of All Time" in 2023. Triple M ranked Rose 133rd on their list of "300 Greatest Singers of All Time" in 2023. In 2014, a chart by the booking company ConcertHotels, built from the recorded ranges of singers on Rolling Stone's 2008 list and several then-current artists, put Rose's recorded range at nearly six octaves, from F1 to B♭6, the widest on the chart. Rose responded that there is no definitive answer to who the best singers are and that he would rather listen to others, and the chart was described as unscientific; a follow-up analysis reportedly placed Mike Patton ahead of him. In 2014, Revolver gave Rose its Ronnie James Dio Lifetime Achievement Award at the Golden Gods Awards.

Other singers have praised or been influenced by Rose. Avenged Sevenfold vocalist M. Shadows named Rose, Phil Anselmo and James Hetfield among his influences as a metal vocalist in a 2024 interview, Queensrÿche vocalist Todd La Torre called Appetite for Destruction "a very influential album" for him, and Sebastian Bach said Rose helped establish him as a solo artist, calling him "like a one-man Led Zeppelin".

== Personal life ==
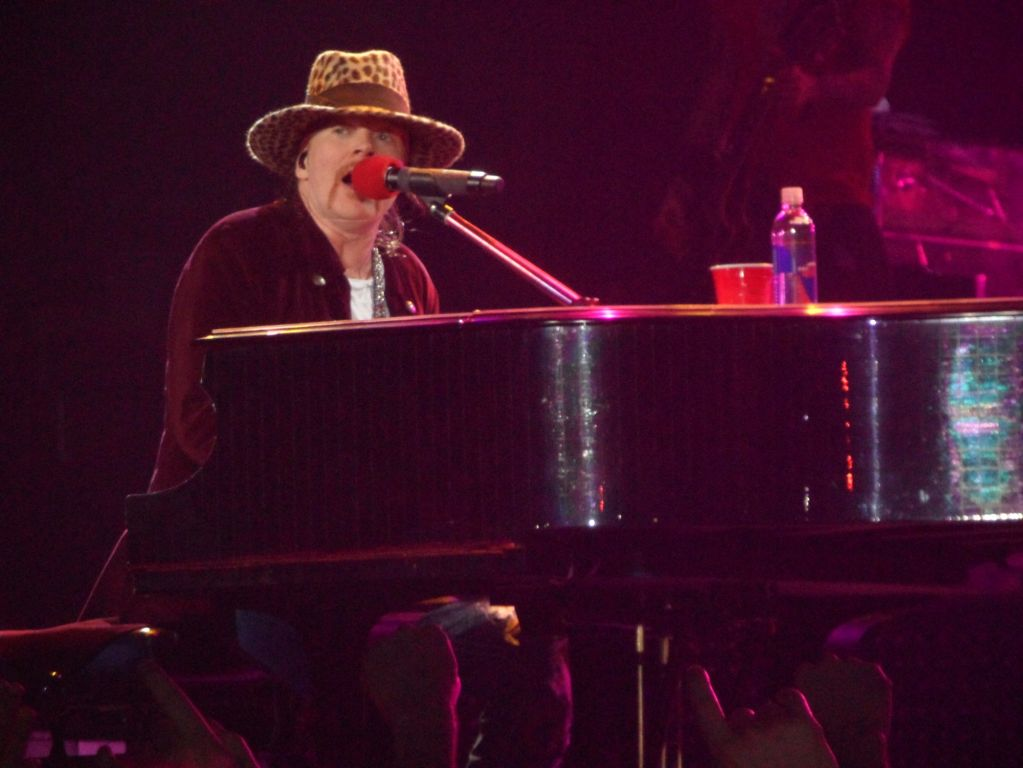
Rose performing "November Rain" at Nottingham Arena in Nottingham, England, in May 2012

During his late teens, Rose was diagnosed with bipolar disorder after a psychiatrist interpreted his delinquent behavior as evidence of psychosis. The same evaluation noted his high IQ. Rose later questioned the diagnosis, stating in an interview that it was based solely on a standardized test: "All of a sudden I'm diagnosed manic-depressive... The medication doesn't help me deal with stress. The only thing it does is help keep people off my back".

Despite his volatile public image, Rose was not a habitual drug user, though he occasionally experimented. In 1986, he intentionally overdosed on painkillers during a period of stress, later recalling: "I just grabbed the bottle of pills in an argument and just gulped them down... I ended up in the hospital." The experience inspired the lyrics to "Coma".

In the early 1990s, Rose embraced homeopathic medicine and began undergoing past life regression therapy. He publicly shared memories of being sexually abused by his biological father at age two, which he said stunted his emotional development: "When they talk about Axl Rose being a screaming two-year-old, they're right". He attributed recurring health issues to psychosomatic "self-punishment", and during the Chinese Democracy sessions, employed a psychic to evaluate potential hires by reading their auras.

Responding to criticism of misogynistic lyrics, Rose acknowledged deep-seated resentment toward women rooted in childhood experiences. In a 1992 interview, he said: "I've had problems with my own masculinity... My mother picked my stepfather over me and watched me get beaten by him... I overheard my grandma going off on men when I was four".

In August 2026, Rose had surgery for Temporomandibular joint dysfunction affecting his jaw.

=== Relationships ===
In early 1986, Rose began a relationship with Erin Everly, daughter of Don Everly of the Everly Brothers. He wrote "Sweet Child o' Mine" for her, and she appeared in its music video. The couple married in Las Vegas on April 28, 1990, but Rose filed for divorce less than a month later. They briefly reconciled, and Everly became pregnant. They chose names—‌Shiloh Blue for a boy, Willow Amelia for a girl—‌but she miscarried in October 1990, which deeply affected Rose. Following an altercation, Everly left in November, and the marriage was annulled in January 1991.

In mid-1991, Rose entered a high-profile relationship with supermodel Stephanie Seymour, who appeared in the videos for "Don't Cry" and "November Rain". Rose grew close to Seymour's son, Dylan, and tried to be a father figure, having lacked one himself. The couple became engaged in February 1993 but separated three weeks later.

Rose is close friends with rock singer Sebastian Bach, and in 2012, he befriended Lana Del Rey. He was also close with Lisa Marie Presley and performed "November Rain" at her memorial service in 2023.

Rose's friendship with Slash deteriorated after Slash left Guns N' Roses in 1996. In 2006, Rose claimed Slash had shown up uninvited the previous year to offer a truce. In 2009, Rose referred to him as "a cancer." By August 2015, Slash stated they had reconciled, later explaining: "We had a lot of issues born out of third-party stuff [...] the longer we didn't talk, the more it got blown out of proportion".

==== Beta Lebeis and Team Brazil ====
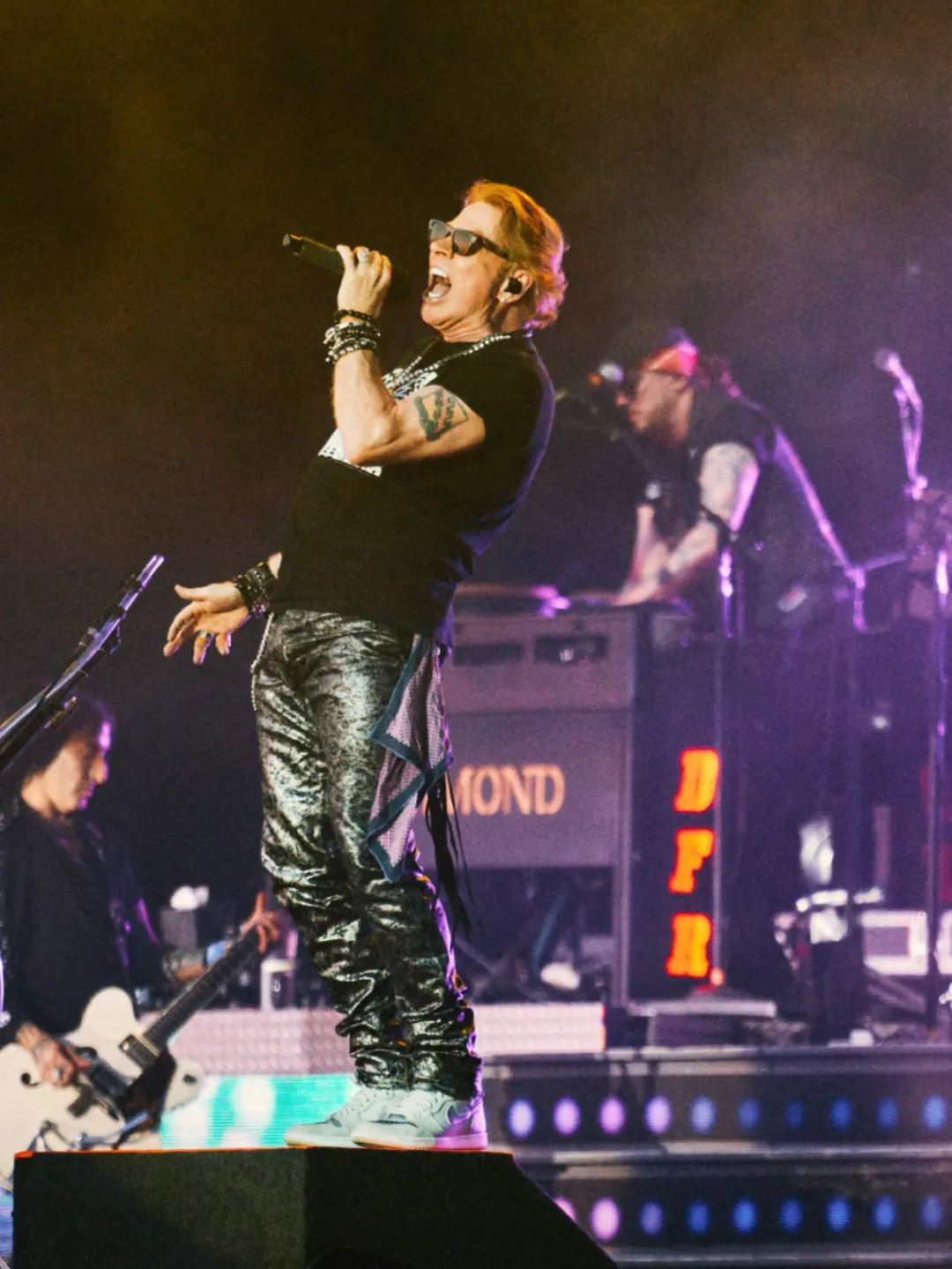
Rose in 2023

In the mid-to-late 1990s, Rose grew close to his assistant Beta Lebeis, describing her as a maternal figure. Lebeis said, "According to him, I am the mother he never had". They first met in 1991 while she was babysitting Seymour's son. By the late 2000s, Beta and her son Fernando became the de facto managers of Guns N' Roses under the name "Team Brazil", following issues with previous management.

At Rock in Rio III in 2001, Rose publicly thanked Beta and her family: "I've been taken care of for the last seven years by a Brazilian family [...] She has been a mother to me, to my manager, to my other assistants, and anyone in the band who ever needed her".

=== Politics ===
On April 28, 2015, Rose sent a letter to Indonesian President Joko Widodo urging the removal of the death penalty option in the Bali Nine case on humanitarian grounds. Following the execution of two individuals, Rose publicly criticized Widodo for "ignoring the international outcry".

Rose has frequently used Twitter to voice political opinions, including criticism of figures in the Trump administration, and Apple CEO Tim Cook. On May 7, 2020, he condemned Treasury Secretary Steven Mnuchin's handling of the COVID-19 pandemic, prompting a direct response from Mnuchin. Guns N' Roses later released a T-shirt satirizing the administration's pandemic response.

== Legal issues ==
As a teenager in Indiana, Rose was arrested more than 20 times. He later said, "Five of those times I was guilty [...] I was drinking at a party underage. The other times I got busted because the cops hated me".

In November 1987, Rose was arrested onstage after assaulting a security guard during a concert. He was held backstage and offered release if he apologized, but refused and was taken into custody. In January 1989, Rose and his brother Stuart Bailey were both arrested for disorderly conduct and public drunkenness when partying at Slash's apartment. Bailey stated, "Well, we were walking on the street and we got arrested for being drunk in public." They were held in the drunk tank for six hours and released without charges; the band's PR manager sent a limo to pick them up to drum up publicity.

In 1990, Rose was charged with assault with a deadly weapon after allegedly striking his neighbor with an empty wine bottle. He claimed the neighbor had swung a bottle at him first, following repeated disputes over loud music. The incident inspired the lyrics to "Right Next Door to Hell" on Use Your Illusion I.

In 1992, Rose was arrested for his role in the Riverport Riot, which occurred the previous year when he abruptly ended a concert near St. Louis. He was found guilty of property damage and assault, fined $50,000, and sentenced to two years' probation.

In 1998, Rose was arrested at Sky Harbor Airport in Phoenix, Arizona for threatening a security guard during a luggage search. He was charged with misdemeanor disorderly conduct. His publicist described the event as a misunderstanding, saying Rose was trying to protect a fragile memento.

In June 2006, Rose was arrested in Sweden for biting a security guard's leg during an altercation in a hotel lobby. He was deemed too intoxicated to be questioned immediately and was later fined $5,500 and ordered to pay $1,360 in damages.

=== Rape charge and assault allegations ===
In 1985, Rose and Slash were charged with felony statutory rape following allegations that Rose had engaged in sexual activity with 15-year-old Michelle Rhoades. The studio was raided by the LAPD while Rose hid, and Rose and Slash spent several weeks as fugitives. Rose stayed at manager Vicky Hamilton's house and the band cancelled several shows to maintain a low profile. The charges were later dropped by the police due to lack of evidence.

Slash referenced the incident in his memoir, describing a woman who had engaged in sexual activity with Rose in the loft of their rehearsal studio and later got into a fight with Rose and "freaked out intensely," resulting in Rose locking her out of the studio. Slash said, "Axl told her to leave and tried throwing her out. I attempted to help mediate the situation to get her out quietly, but that wasn't happening." Slash said he didn't know the woman's name or how old she was, claiming "the truth was, Axl definitely had sex with the girl but it had been consensual and no one had raped her." Hamilton said "Axl had a guest at the rehearsal studio, and he basically took her clothes off and locked her outside, and the girl went to the cops and said he raped her." and later recalled "I asked him what happened and he said very little, other than 'it was stupid, involving a girl... it won't happen again', he didn't give me any more information." Rose also commented on the event, claiming "this hippy chick wandered in and started fucking with our equipment trying to break stuff... so eventually she wound up running down Sunset naked, all dingy, and didn't even know her own name."

In 2024, Rhoades made additional new allegations regarding the event, claiming that she had been in a relationship with Rose at age 15 and experienced a miscarriage. Rhoades said that she later showed up to the band's rehearsal space to tell Rose what happened, saying "It went from 'we need to talk because you're pregnant with my baby' to him screaming at me that I killed the baby, to him sobbing in my arms that he should have been there for me." Rose left her at the studio, and Rhoades says she eventually went outside to use an outhouse behind the studio, where she allegedly saw Rose having sex with a different woman, and she approached them to confront him about it. Rhoades alleged that she went back to the studio to grab her purse before Rose brought her back to the outhouse and ripped off her dress, saying "As soon as my clothes hit the floor, his roadie came in and grabbed my clothes." She alleged that when demanding her clothes back, Rose picked her up, took her through the parking lot, and brought her back to the studio as she yelled for help. She claimed, "He threw me in the studio, and almost immediately he was holding me down." She claimed Rose "put bondage cuffs around my ankles and [he] was really hurting me and allowing these other people to put themselves inside of me and pinch me and all these things." She alleged that soon after, Rose raped her: "And then he spun me around and he put himself in me and entered me and put his face in my face. I remember trying to bite him. And then it was almost as if he came to himself for a second. He threw everyone off of me, the ankle cuffs off of me. And he was holding me again. I remember begging him for my clothes... And he told me that I didn't deserve my clothes." She claims she left the studio naked, where a member of a band in the studio next door gave her a towel to cover herself. Her mother's then-boyfriend claimed he picked her up in that state, and she told him not to tell her mother, but she found out and went to the police. Rhoades said she had emotional anguish and suicidal ideation leading up to the court date but ultimately decided not to pursue charges and that Rose "profusely apologized" to her. No legal action was taken following these new allegations.

In 1993, Rose filed a lawsuit against model Stephanie Seymour, alleging assault at a holiday gathering. Seymour filed a counterclaim citing assault and battery. Both suits were settled out of court. In 1994, Rose's ex-wife Erin Everly filed a civil suit alleging physical and emotional abuse during their relationship, which was also settled privately.

On November 22, 2023, Rose was sued by actress Sheila Kennedy under New York's Adult Survivors Act, which temporarily extended the statute of limitations for sexual assault claims. Kennedy alleged that the incident occurred in 1989, when she attend a party in Rose's hotel suite, where she and other guests were consumed cocaine and alcohol, before she was allegedly attacked and assaulted by Rose. Rose denied the allegations, stating that he had no recollection of meeting Kennedy. Rose's legal team filed to dismiss the suit in February 2024, citing Kennedy's 2016 memoir No One's Pet, in which she wrote, "I was ok with this. I wanted to be with him since the minute I'd first laid eyes on him, and now I was getting him", and an interview Kennedy gave in the 2021 documentary Look Away, in which she stated that Rose had acted gently and was not trying to hurt her, ultimately saying, "I did not consider it rape. It was consensual." The case was privately settled with prejudice in December 2024, with Rose reiterating his denial: "As I have said from the beginning, I deny the allegations. There was no assault".

=== Lawsuits ===
In 1992, an audience member involved in the Riverport Riot sued Rose for $210,000 in damages. The case was settled out of court for $160,000.

In 2004, Rose unsuccessfully attempted to block the release of The Roots of Guns N' Roses, a compilation of early Hollywood Rose recordings. Later that year, he joined Slash and Duff McKagan in an unsuccessful lawsuit to prevent the release of Greatest Hits. In 2006, Slash and McKagan sued Rose over publishing and songwriting credits, which Rose attributed to a clerical error during a publisher transition.

In 2010, Rose was sued by a rental company for returning a leased car in damaged condition and failing to make payments dating back to 2005.

That same year, former manager Irving Azoff filed a lawsuit seeking $1.87 million in unpaid touring fees. Rose countersued, alleging mismanagement and intentional sabotage of album sales to pressure a reunion with former bandmates. Both suits were settled. Rose later stated the settlement required Guns N' Roses to perform a number of shows promoted by Azoff's company, Live Nation. Azoff denied pressuring Rose to reunite with the old lineup.

In November 2010, Rose sued Activision for $20 million, claiming the company violated an agreement by featuring Slash and Velvet Revolver imagery in Guitar Hero III: Legends of Rock despite licensing "Welcome to the Jungle". The lawsuit was dismissed in 2013 due to the statute of limitations and reliance on oral agreements.

Rose faced additional lawsuits related to concert incidents. In 2013, a man sued after being struck by a microphone at an Australian show, resulting in dental injuries. In 2022, another individual filed suit over injuries from a mic stand thrown during a 2021 concert in Pennsylvania. Following a third incident that year, Rose announced he would stop throwing objects into the crowd.

In 2014, Rose threatened legal action over the release of recordings from Rapidfire, his pre-Hollywood Rose band, temporarily blocking their availability on digital platforms.

In 2016, Rose issued DMCA takedown requests to Google in an attempt to suppress a widely circulated image taken in 2010 published under the headline "OMFG Axl Rose is Fat", which led to a Streisand effect.

Later that year, former Guns N' Roses keyboardist Chris Pitman sued Rose for $125,000 in unpaid wages. The case was settled in November 2016.

In 2022, Rose filed a trademark lawsuit against a weapons dealer operating under the name "Texas Guns and Roses", citing reputational harm.

== Discography ==
=== With Guns N' Roses ===
- Appetite for Destruction (1987)
- G N' R Lies (1988)
- Use Your Illusion I (1991)
- Use Your Illusion II (1991)
- "The Spaghetti Incident?" (1993)
- Chinese Democracy (2008)

=== With Hollywood Rose ===
- The Roots of Guns N' Roses (2004)

=== With Rapidfire ===
- Ready to Rumble EP (2014)

=== As featured artist ===
Year	Title	Album
1988	"Under My Wheels" (Alice Cooper feat. Axl Rose, Slash and Izzy Stradlin)	The Decline of Western Civilization Part II: The Metal Years – Original Motion Picture Soundtrack
1994	"Dead Flowers" (Gilby Clarke feat. Axl Rose)	Pawnshop Guitars
2007	"Back in the Saddle" "(Love Is) a Bitchslap" "Stuck Inside" (Sebastian Bach feat. Axl Rose)	Angel Down
2024	"Love to Love" (Michael Schenker)	My Years with UFO

=== As session musician or writer ===
- The End of the Innocence by Don Henley (1989; "I Will Not Go Quietly")
- Fire and Gasoline by Steve Jones (1989; "I Did U No Wrong")
- Pigs by Asphalt Ballet (1993; "Crash Diet")
- Anxious Disease by The Outpatience (1996; "Anxious Disease" feat. Slash)

== Other work ==
- New Looney Tunes (2018, "Rock the Rock")

== Filmography ==
Year	Title	Role	Notes
1988	The Dead Pool	Musician at funeral	Uncredited
2004	Grand Theft Auto: San Andreas	K-DST DJ Tommy "The Nightmare" Smith (voice)	Video game
2011	That Metal Show	Himself	
2012	Jimmy Kimmel Live!	Himself	
2018	New Looney Tunes	Himself (voice)	TV show
2021	Scooby-Doo and Guess Who?	Himself (voice)	TV show
2021	Grand Theft Auto: The Trilogy - The Definitive Edition	K-DST DJ Tommy "The Nightmare" Smith (voice)	Video game Archival recordings Remaster of Grand Theft Auto: San Andreas only
