= It's So Easy (Guns N' Roses song) =

1987 single by Guns N' Roses

- UK 7" Vinyl cover

Single by Guns N' Roses

from the album Appetite for Destruction
- A-side: "Mr. Brownstone"
- Released: June 8, 1987
- Recorded: 1986–1987
- Genre: Hard rock; heavy metal; punk rock
- Length: 3:24
- Label: Geffen
- Songwriters: Guns N' Roses; West Arkeen
- Producer: Mike Clink

Guns N' Roses singles chronology
"It's So Easy" and "Mr. Brownstone" (1987)	"Welcome to the Jungle" (1987)

Music video
- "It's So Easy" on YouTube

"It's So Easy" is a song by the American rock band Guns N' Roses, appearing on their 1987 debut studio album, Appetite for Destruction. The song was released as the band's first single on June 8, 1987, in the UK, where it reached number 84 on the UK Singles Chart as a double A-Side with "Mr. Brownstone". It was also released as a maxi-single in the former West Germany later in the same year.

== Composition ==
According to an interview published in Hit Parader in March 1988, "It's So Easy" is "an account of a time Duff McKagan and West Arkeen, and also the rest of the band, were kinda going through. They didn't have money, but they had a lot of hangers on and girls [they] could basically live off of ... things were just too easy. There's an emptiness; it's so easy."

In an Eddie Trunk interview from 2006, Axl Rose said that McKagan and Arkeen originally wrote the song as an acoustic "Hippie Ya-Ya" song, and that it was Slash's decision to turn it into a rock song. McKagan stated that Arkeen taught him about alternate tuning, leading the song to have a more distinctive sound, saying "without open-E tuning, that song wouldn't have happened, that's why West has songwriting credit on it."

== Live ==
- "It's So Easy" is one of the band's live staples, performed early in a typical setlist at almost every live performance since 1986. The song was the band's regular show opener after the release of Appetite for Destruction in 1987 and was a frequent opener during the Use Your Illusion Tour in 1991–1993. The song opened every show on the Not in This Lifetime... Tour.
- Slash's post-Guns N' Roses project, Slash's Snakepit, performed the song during their tour in support of Ain't Life Grand in 2001.
- Duff McKagan, the song's primary songwriter, performed the song in most of his post-Guns N' Roses projects, including the tour in support of his 1993 album Believe in Me. His band, Loaded, have been performing the song since their inception in 1999.
- Velvet Revolver, which included Guns N' Roses members Slash, Duff McKagan, and Use Your Illusion-era drummer Matt Sorum, frequently performed the song during live performance with Scott Weiland on vocals.

== Music video ==
On October 10, 1989, over two years after the release of the original single, a promo video was made for "It's So Easy". The video features the band playing live in front of a crowd on stage at the Cathouse nightclub in Hollywood, and a cameo by Axl Rose's then-fiancé Erin Everly who is being treated by him in a BDSM-style way. A heavily edited version of the video was later made for promotional purposes. It was not included on the band's Welcome to the Videos DVD, and as such its content is rare and can only be found on the internet. At the time the video was released, Guns N' Roses were not as popular as they would eventually become, the single was never released in the United States and its video was never accepted by MTV.

The video was finally released on May 28, 2018.

== Track listings ==
All songs credited to Guns N' Roses; "It's So Easy" co-credited to West Arkeen

7" vinyl (GEF 22)
No.	Title	Writer(s)	Length
1.	"It's So Easy"		3:24
2.	"Mr. Brownstone "	Izzy Stradlin, Slash	3:47
Total length:			7:11

12" vinyl (GEF 22T)
No.	Title	Writer(s)	Length
1.	"It's So Easy"	McKagan, Arkeen	3:24
2.	"Mr. Brownstone"	Stradlin, Slash	3:47
3.	"Shadow of Your Love"	Rose, Stradlin, Paul Tobias	3:03
4.	"Move to the City"	Stradlin, Del James, Chris Weber	3:41
Total length:			13:55

== Charts ==
Chart (1987)	Peak position
UK Singles (Official Charts)	84

== Personnel ==
- W. Axl Rose – lead vocals, backing vocals
- Slash – lead guitar
- Izzy Stradlin – rhythm guitar, backing vocals
- Duff "Rose" McKagan – bass guitar, backing vocals
- Steven Adler – drums
