= Not in This Lifetime... Tour =

2016–19 concert tour by Guns N' Roses

- Tour by Guns N' Roses
- The front of the band's tour program featuring the classic bullet style logo
- Location: Africa; Asia; Europe; North America; Oceania; South America
- Start date: April 1, 2016
- End date: November 2, 2019
- Legs: 11
- No. of shows: 175
- Attendance: 5,371,891
- Box office: $584.2 million (158 shows)

Guns N' Roses concert chronology
- Appetite for Democracy (2012–2014); Not in This Lifetime... Tour (2016–2019); We're F'N' Back! Tour (2021–2022)

The Not in This Lifetime... Tour was a concert tour by the American hard rock band Guns N' Roses, spanning from April 1, 2016, to November 2, 2019. It featured classic lineup members Axl Rose, Slash and Duff McKagan, marking the first time since the Use Your Illusion Tour in 1993 that the three performed together. After the previous tour in 2014, guitarists DJ Ashba & Ron "Bumblefoot" Thal, bassist Tommy Stinson and keyboardist Chris Pitman left Guns N' Roses, leaving the band with several open spots. Former members Slash and McKagan rejoined the band and Melissa Reese joined as keyboardist. The group embarked on a world tour that spanned all continents except Antarctica. They performed 175 shows making it their third longest tour ever, just behind the Use Your Illusion Tour and the Chinese Democracy Tour. The group welcomed former drummer Steven Adler to the stage for several shows as a guest spot, the first time he had played with the group since 1990. The tour was a financial success, grossing over $584.2 million, making it the fourth-highest-grossing concert tour of all time. The tour was 2016's highest-earning per-city global concert tour as well as the fourth-highest-grossing overall that year. In 2017, the tour ranked as the second highest grossing worldwide tour. The tour was honored at the Billboard Live Music Awards in November 2017, winning Top Tour/Top Draw and being nominated for Top Boxscore.

== Overview ==
=== Background ===
After their last tour ended in 2014, there was uncertainty surrounding the band, especially the guitarist situation. Ron "Bumblefoot" Thal had hinted during the last part of the tour that these would be his last shows with Guns N' Roses. However, after the tour ended, no official word on the situation was given from Guns N' Roses nor Thal himself. During several South American shows on the tour, Duff McKagan had filled in for bassist Tommy Stinson, who fulfilled previous commitments with his other band The Replacements. Stinson left the band due to personal issues after the tour, stating "I actually had to just start turning down tours because I was unable to tour.. my personal life was going to prevent me from doing... about five tours that they called me to do, and I just said I can't do 'em."

Almost a year after the tour ended, on May 7, 2015, Slash revealed in an interview on CBS This Morning that much of the tension that had existed between Axl and himself was gone, saying: "Well, we haven't really talked in a long time. But a lot of the tension that you were talking about has dissipated. We don't have all those issues anymore." When asked specifically about the chances of Guns N' Roses reuniting, he said: "I gotta be careful what I say there. I mean, if everybody wanted to do it and do it for the right reasons, you know, I think the fans would love it. I think it might be fun at some point to try and do that, but it just starts to get into a whole complex thing. But anyway, it's really between the guys in the band." This sparked the start of what would prove to be a long period of speculation on a reunion by both the fans and the media. Slash later revealed that he and Axl spoke via telephone in March 2015.

Suddenly, on July 27, 2015, the news broke that Guns N' Roses' co-lead guitarist, DJ Ashba, was leaving the band. He wrote a letter explaining that he was going to focus his work on his other group, Sixx:A.M., which he had formed with bassist Nikki Sixx and vocalist James Michael in 2007. At the same time he thanked Rose for the opportunity he was given by playing with Guns N' Roses and it seemed like they had left things on good terms. While this news story was picking up, it was at the same time confirmed by a representative of Guns N' Roses that Thal was officially out of the band. The leaving of both Ashba and Thal, combined with Slash's comments on a reunion only a couple months before, further fueled both media and fan speculation about a reunion being in the works.

Furthermore, on August 22, 2015, Slash stated to the Swedish newspaper Aftonbladet that Axl and he had spoken recently. This was considered a big news story because it was common knowledge that the two of them had not spoken since he left the band in 1996. When asked about the re-connection with Rose, Slash commented "it was probably way overdue". Rumors of a reunited Guns N' Roses started to pick up more and more during late 2015. More reports came in claiming to have a confirmation that a reunion would happen, but no official statement was made during this period. One of the questions on people's minds was if this was going to be a full reunion of the "classic line-up" or if it would be just one or two people from that line-up returning to the band. Steven Adler (the drummer from Guns N' Roses' "classic line-up") admitted during a radio interview with Eddie Trunk that he had not heard anything from Guns N' Roses about a reunion. Classic-era member Izzy Stradlin later confirmed to Rolling Stone that he will have no involvement with the new lineup. Former drummer Matt Sorum stated he was not asked to be part of the reunion, (Note: Sorum later stated he was offered a chance to guest, but declined because he would not be paid.) while departed guitarist Ashba claimed he was asked by Rose to be a part of the lineup but had turned it down, citing his commitment to Sixx:A.M. Former rhythm guitarist Gilby Clarke turned down an invitation for a guest spot. Stradlin explained his absence on the tour stating "they didn't want to split the loot equally". Ultimately, Chinese Democracy-era members Richard Fortus and Frank Ferrer remained with the band to fill the rhythm guitarist and drummer slots respectively.

=== Announcement ===
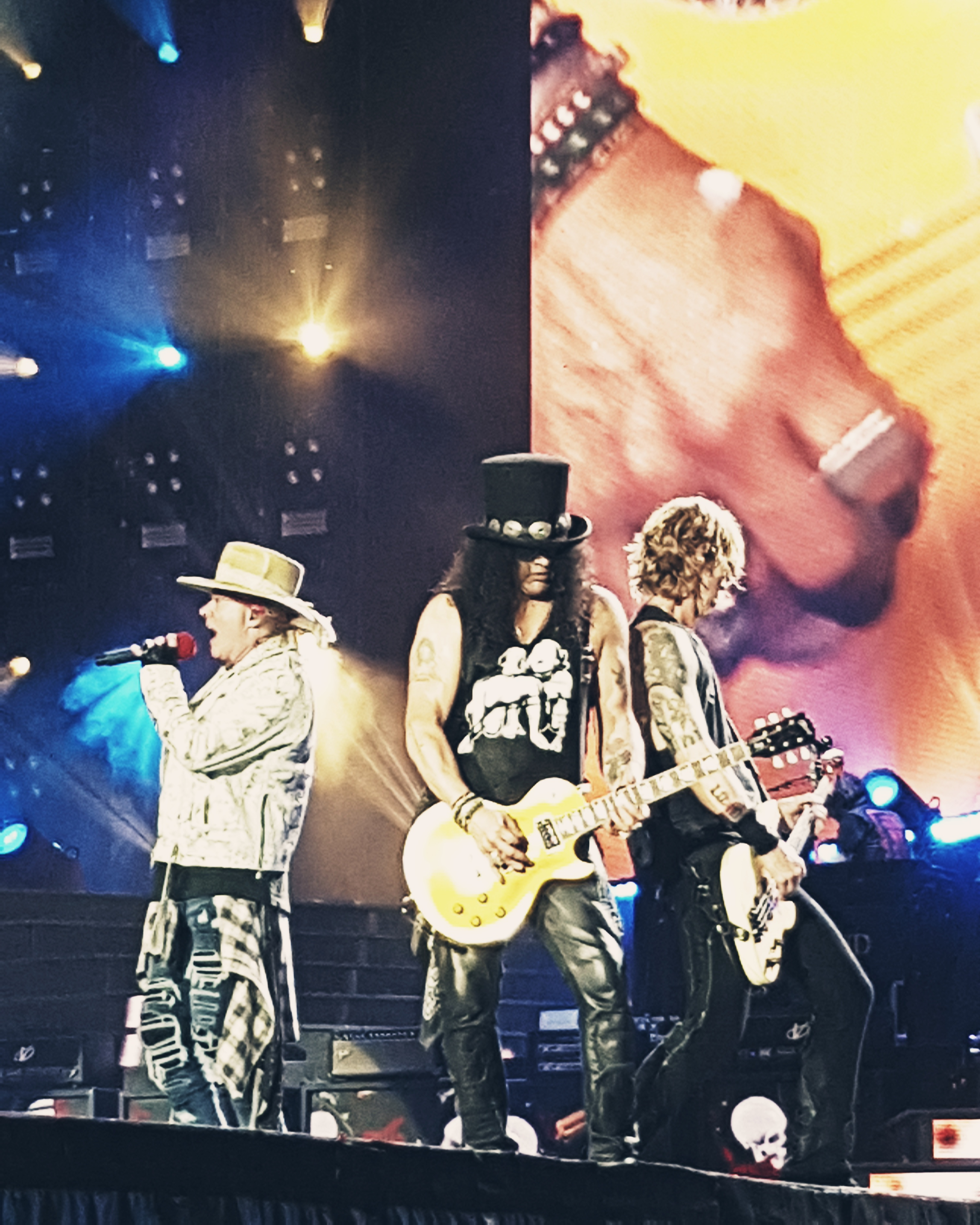
Vocalist Axl Rose, guitarist Slash and bassist Duff McKagan performed together for the first time in 23 years as part of the tour.

In late December 2015, the Guns N' Roses website was updated, scrapping much of the content and displaying the classic Guns N' Roses bullet-logo. The logo had not been used in official promotion since the Use Your Illusion days. Then, on Christmas Day, a teaser trailer debuted before the new Star Wars movie. The 15-second video showed black and white shots of a concert audience with the opening words of "Welcome to the Jungle" played. No additional narration or text accompanied the trailer.

On December 29, 2015, Billboard reported that Slash was set to rejoin the band and a "reunited" lineup would headline Coachella 2016. Rose was set to appear on Jimmy Kimmel Live! the following week to talk about the future of the band, but his appearance was cancelled due to "unforeseen circumstances". Guns N' Roses were officially announced as the headliner of Coachella on January 4, 2016, with the press reporting Slash and Duff McKagan were rejoining the band. The Coachella festival then confirmed via press release that McKagan and Slash were rejoining. April concerts in Las Vegas and Mexico City were announced subsequently.

The full tour announcement came on April 1, 2016, when the band announced 20 cities as part of a North American leg of the tour dubbed "Not in This Lifetime...". The tour's name is a reference to a 2012 interview in which Rose, when asked about when a potential reunion would happen, responded "not in this lifetime." The reunion was billed as a "regrouping" by the band instead of a full reunion, since Slash and McKagan were filling empty spots in the existing band lineup. Additional dates in Chicago, New England, New York, and Los Angeles were announced on April 25 due to shows selling out. On May 18, Alice In Chains and Lenny Kravitz were announced as openers for select shows of the tour. Two weeks before the tour began, The Cult, Chris Stapleton, Billy Talent, and Skrillex were announced as additional openers for select shows. On June 30, Wolfmother and Tyler Bryant & the Shakedown were announced for several shows. Zakk Wylde was added as an additional opener to the band's show of August 15 in Glendale, Arizona.

Additional legs of the tour were announced throughout the year, including Latin American, Asian, and Oceanian legs. Babymetal was announced as openers for the Japanese shows in 2017. In late November, commercials started airing in the United States with footage from the tour with the tagline "They're back for more in 2017", teasing a return to North America. On December 5, the band announced 35 North American and European dates for 2017, including a return to St. Louis for the first time since the 1991 Riverport Riot.

On March 7, 2017, the band was announced as part of the 2017 edition of Rock in Rio, playing on September 23. A YouTube video was released promoting this announcement, revealing that the band would co-headline their day with The Who. This marked the fourth appearance by Guns N' Roses with the festival in Rio de Janeiro, with the second edition in 1991 being their first time there.

=== Notable events ===
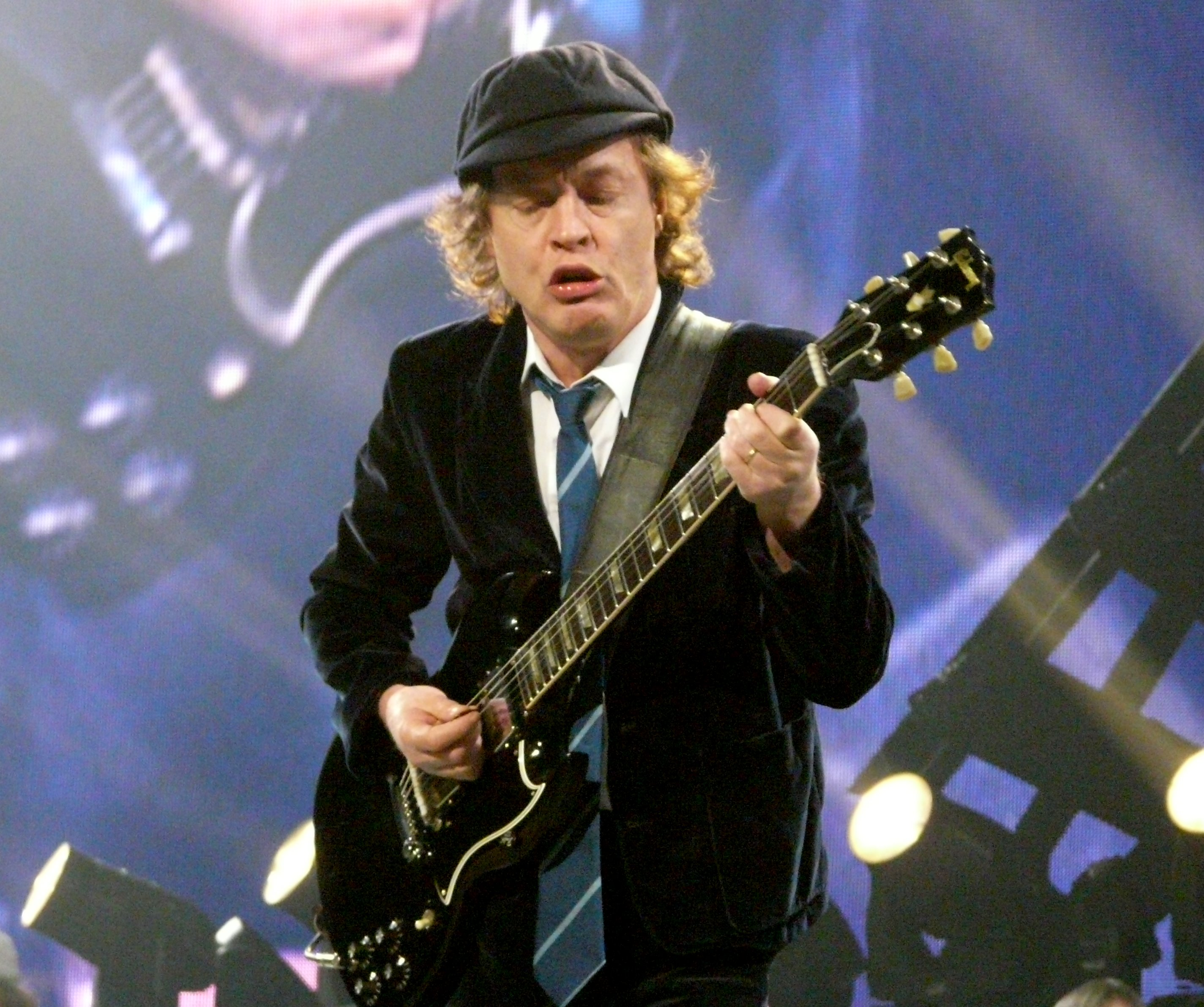
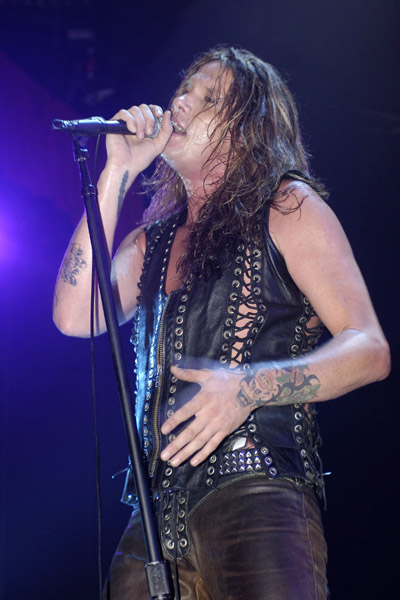
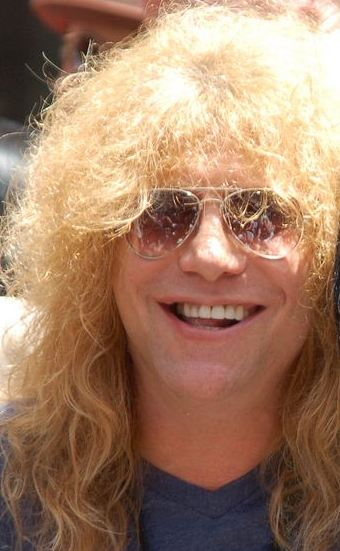
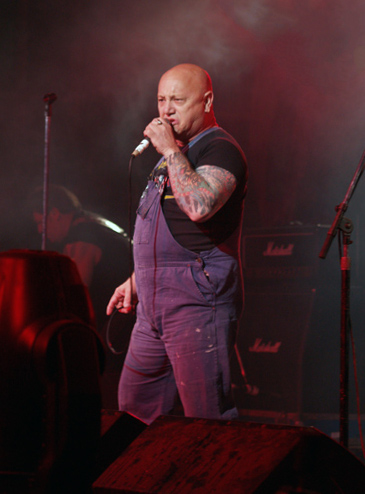
AC/DC guitarist Angus Young jammed with Guns N' Roses during several shows, while former Skid Row singer Sebastian Bach joined the band on April 9, 2016 in Las Vegas. Former drummer Steven Adler joined the band for two songs at 5 shows of the tour, and Rose Tattoo vocalist Angry Anderson appeared on the show of February 11, 2017.

While originally slated to commence in Las Vegas on April 8, 2016, a previously unannounced warmup gig at the Troubadour in Los Angeles took place on April 1, 2016. Rumors of the secret show had started the night before, and fans were starting to gather outside the old Tower Records building at Sunset Boulevard in West Hollywood. Rumblings that a ticket sale for the show would take place there started a line of people that grew during the night and into the early morning of April 1. Then, during the morning, the announcement came that the rumors were true and tickets for the club show would go on sale at 12 pm at the Tower Records building. They charged a $10 "retro" ticket price for the show. Later in the evening, as the band took the stage at the Troubadour, it was revealed that Melissa Reese, who has previously worked with former drummer Bryan "Brain" Mantia on several projects, had replaced longtime second keyboardist Chris Pitman for the tour. Pitman quit the band two weeks before the tour began, he had previously publicly criticized the tour as a "nostalgia tour" and "a money grab" and later mentioned he "quit the oldies band". During the show at the Troubadour, Rose fell and broke his foot. For the following concerts, Rose was given Dave Grohl's customized throne that Grohl used to perform when he broke his leg at a concert. The band's first scheduled concerts with Slash and McKagan took place at the newly opened T-Mobile Arena on April 8 and 9, 2016. Alice in Chains were the opening act for the Las Vegas shows, while The Cult opened the first two shows outside the United States in Mexico City on April 19 and 20.

Former Skid Row singer Sebastian Bach joined the band on stage during the second of the two Las Vegas shows in April 2016, sharing the lead vocals with Rose on the song "My Michelle". Bach has guested on the same song in a similar fashion on many previous Guns N' Roses tours, but this was the first time performing it alongside the returned Slash and McKagan. Rose Tattoo singer Angry Anderson joined the band onstage to help them cover the Rose Tattoo song "Nice Boys" at their concert in Australia in February 2017. It was the first time that Anderson performed the song with Guns N' Roses since 2007.

On April 16, 2016, just hours before their performance at the Coachella Festival's first weekend was scheduled to start, the news broke that Rose would be joining AC/DC to fill in as the lead vocalist for the remaining dates of their Rock or Bust tour. Brian Johnson had to leave the group previously due to risk of hearing loss. During Guns N' Roses' show that night, AC/DC guitarist Angus Young guested with the band for performances of the AC/DC classics "Whole Lotta Rosie" and "Riff Raff", giving the audience an early preview of how the guitarist's sound and Rose's voice sounded together. Young joined the band for three more shows on the tour in early 2017, as well as a show in Germany in June and in The Netherlands in July.

During the April 23 Coachella concert, McKagan had Prince's symbol featured on his bass guitar as a tribute honoring his death just days prior. Rose talked about them being fans of Prince, but did not have enough time to get together a song of his to perform in honor of him. Instead, they dedicated the whole concert to his memory.

Steven Adler joined the band on stage for the first time in 26 years during the concert of July 6, 2016 in Cincinnati, Ohio, where he performed "Out Ta Get Me" and "My Michelle". The drummer's last performance with the band was at the Farm Aid concert on April 7, 1990, in Indianapolis, Indiana, although he did perform alongside Slash, McKagan, Sorum and Gilby Clarke during Guns N' Roses' induction into the Rock and Roll Hall of Fame in 2012, with Rose and Stradlin being absent from the ceremony. Myles Kennedy, of Alter Bridge and Myles Kennedy and the Conspirators fame, sang in place of Rose. Previously, Adler was rumored to take part in the surprise show of April 1, 2016 at the Troubadour before back surgery forced him to cancel. Adler repeated his appearance at the concert of July 9, 2016 in Nashville, Tennessee. Towards the end of the North American trek, Adler performed the same two songs at the second of the two Dodger Stadium shows in Los Angeles, California. During the Latin American leg, Adler joined the band for a song each of the two nights in Buenos Aires.

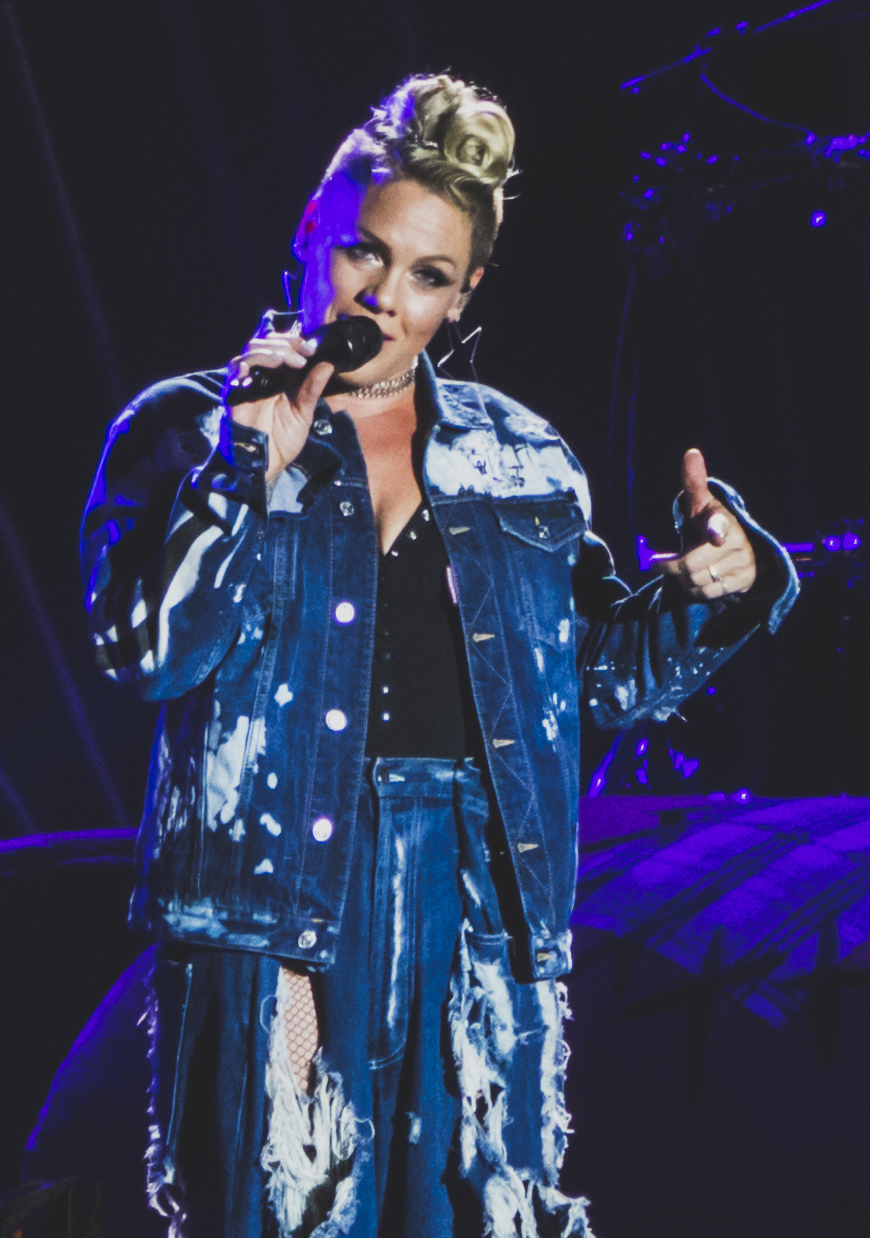
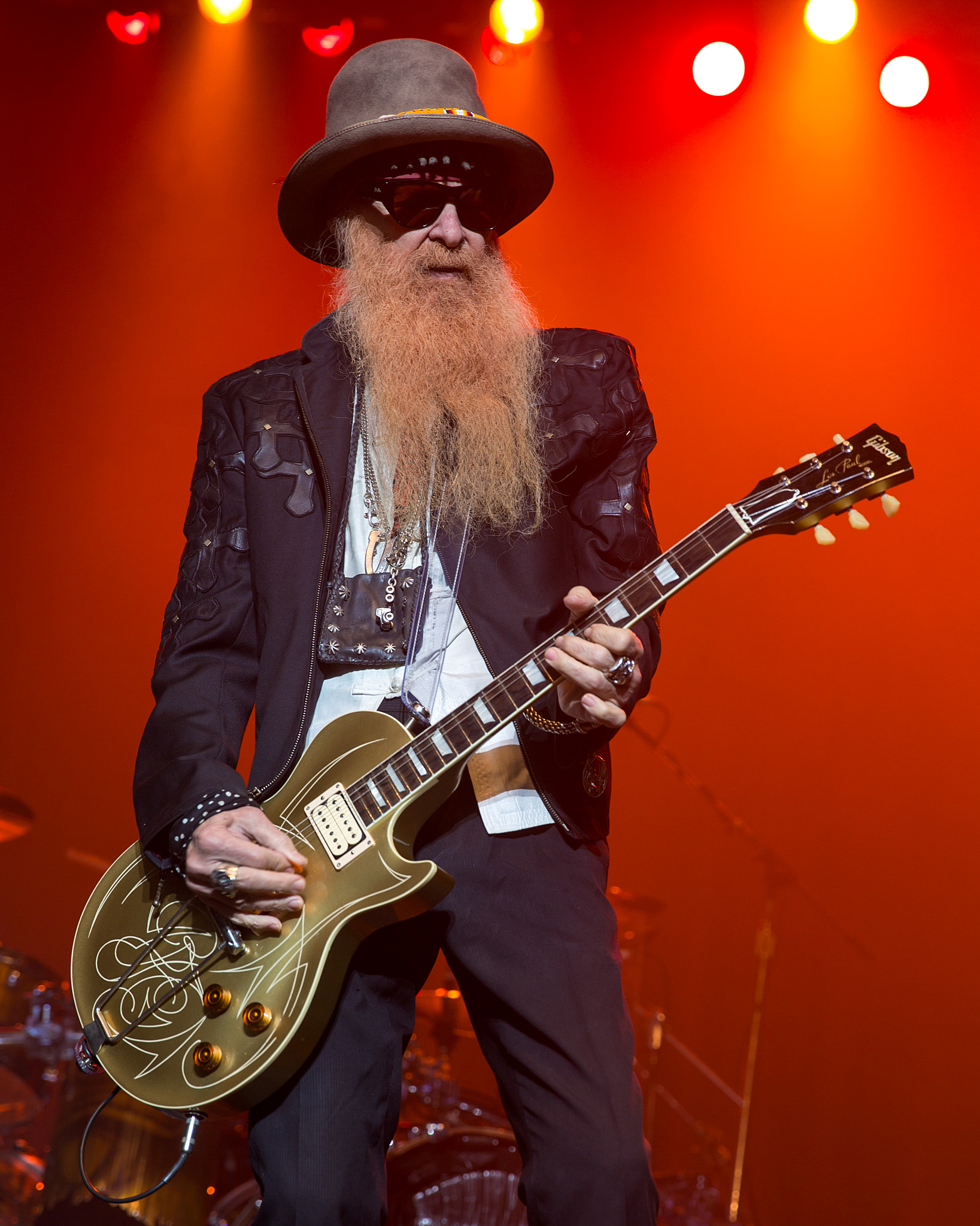
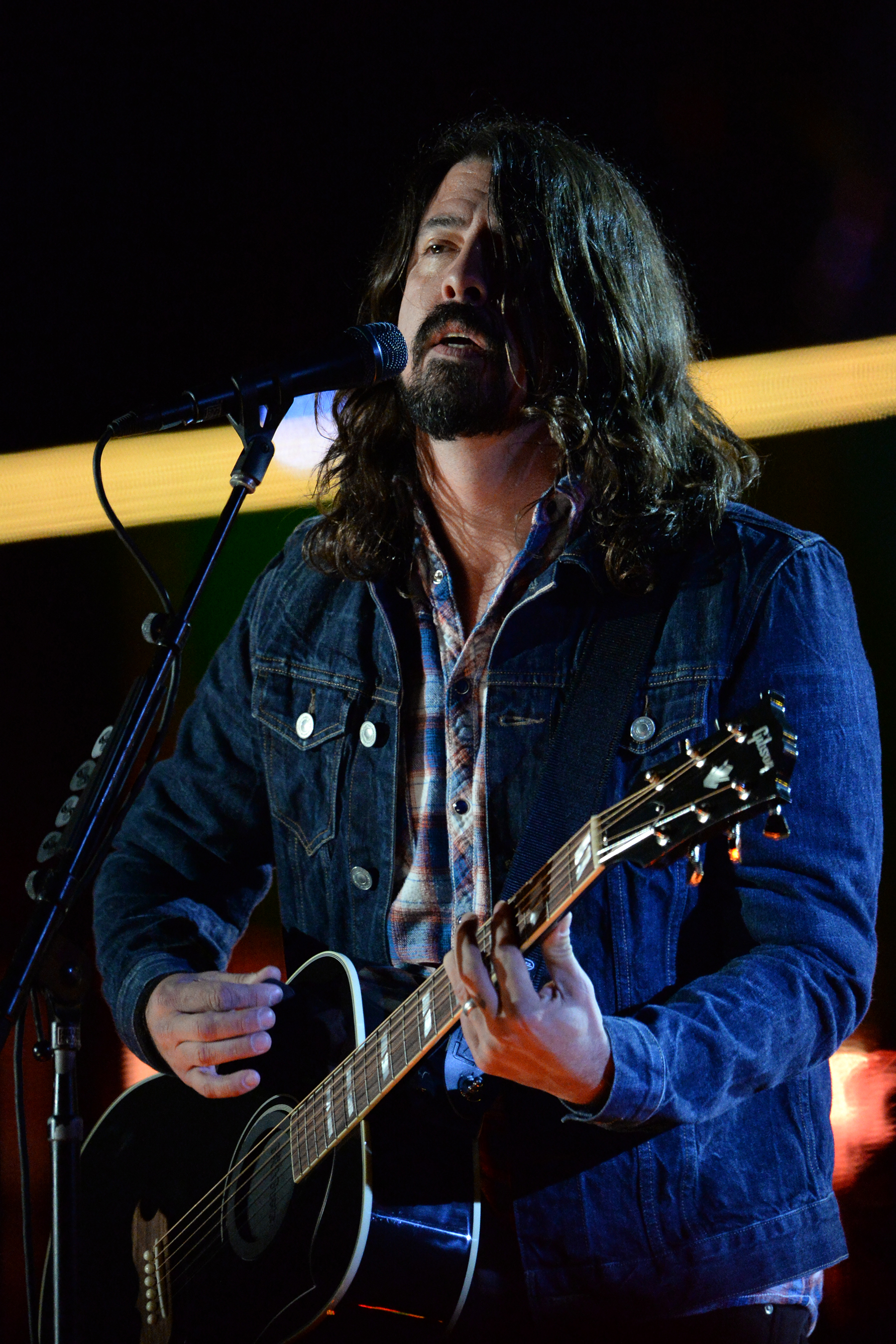
P!nk, Billy Gibbons, and Dave Grohl all performed with the band in 2017.

When the band and crew were traveling between Philadelphia and Toronto on July 15, 2016, they were stopped and detained at the Canadian border for having a gun on board their transportation. Rose revealed this while on stage in Toronto on July 16, saying "... so we weren't exactly arrested, we were detained", and further remarked of the customs officers "They were very nice. They were very nice". He then jokingly added "They were very understanding. You know, it happens – you can forget you had a f—in' gun". A band representative later confirmed the story while adding that the gun did not belong to any member of the band. During a show in Mexico on November 30, the band invited several fans onstage to smash a large Donald Trump piñata. Rose had previously altered lyrics to "Civil War" during a concert to reference Trump.

During the show of May 27 in Ireland, the band debuted their cover of "Black Hole Sun" in honor of Chris Cornell, who had died just over a week before, on May 18. Cornell had previously worked with both McKagan (in Mad Season) and Slash (appearing on the song "Promise" on Slash). In a 1989 interview, Rose had called Cornell the best rock vocalist at the time, and during the Use Your Illusion tour in the early 90s, Soundgarden opened for Guns N' Roses in both the United States and Europe.

Sometime in 2017 during a show in the midwest, former rhythm guitarist Izzy Stradlin participated in a sound check with the group, with the intention of guesting during the show. However, former manager Alan Niven claims Stradlin walked out and "didn't want to have anything to do with it". Stradlin had reportedly declined special guest appearances similar to the ones Adler had.

On August 30, 2017, in Edmonton, Alberta, Canada – the band covered "Wichita Lineman", a song made famous by Glen Campbell. That was the first live performance of the song by them, with Rose presenting it saying "We're going to play something we've never played before. It might not be your thing, but we're just trying to pay a tribute to someone. It's not what you think". After the song, he said "For Glen", honoring the country singer-guitarist who died August 8, 2017. Rolling Stone magazine described it as "their most unexpected cover of the tour". During the same concert, the band also covered "I Got You (I Feel Good)" by James Brown for the first time since 2006.

While playing "Patience" at their show of October 11, 2017 in New York, the band was joined onstage by P!nk who sang guest vocals. Additional guest musicians were featured throughout the tour; Billy Gibbons of ZZ Top joined the band for "Patience" on November 10, and Dave Grohl of Foo Fighters joined for "Paradise City" on November 14.

On June 3, 2018, during a show in Germany, the band covered "Slither" by Velvet Revolver, a supergroup that Slash and McKagan (alongside Scott Weiland, Dave Kushner, and former Guns N' Roses drummer Matt Sorum) were a part of during their time away from Guns N' Roses. On June 6, the band played "Shadow of Your Love" for the first time since the Appetite for Destruction Tour. During the show of November 25 in Abu Dhabi, Rose cut the show short after 20 songs after battling an illness for several hours before the show.

== Personnel ==
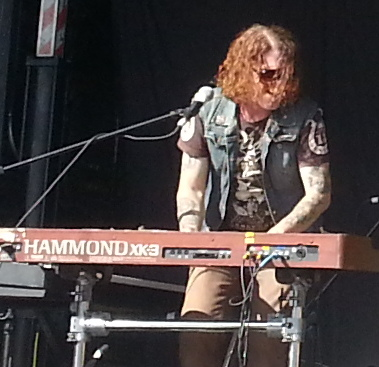
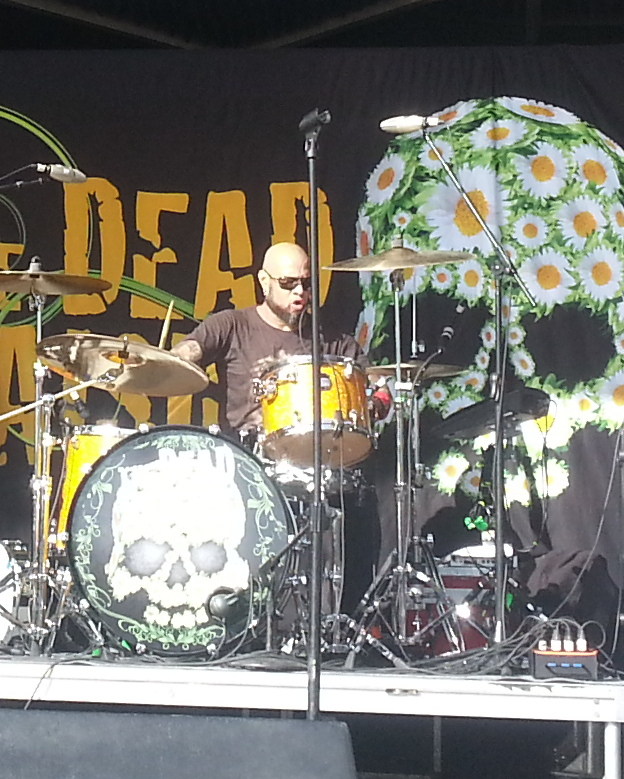
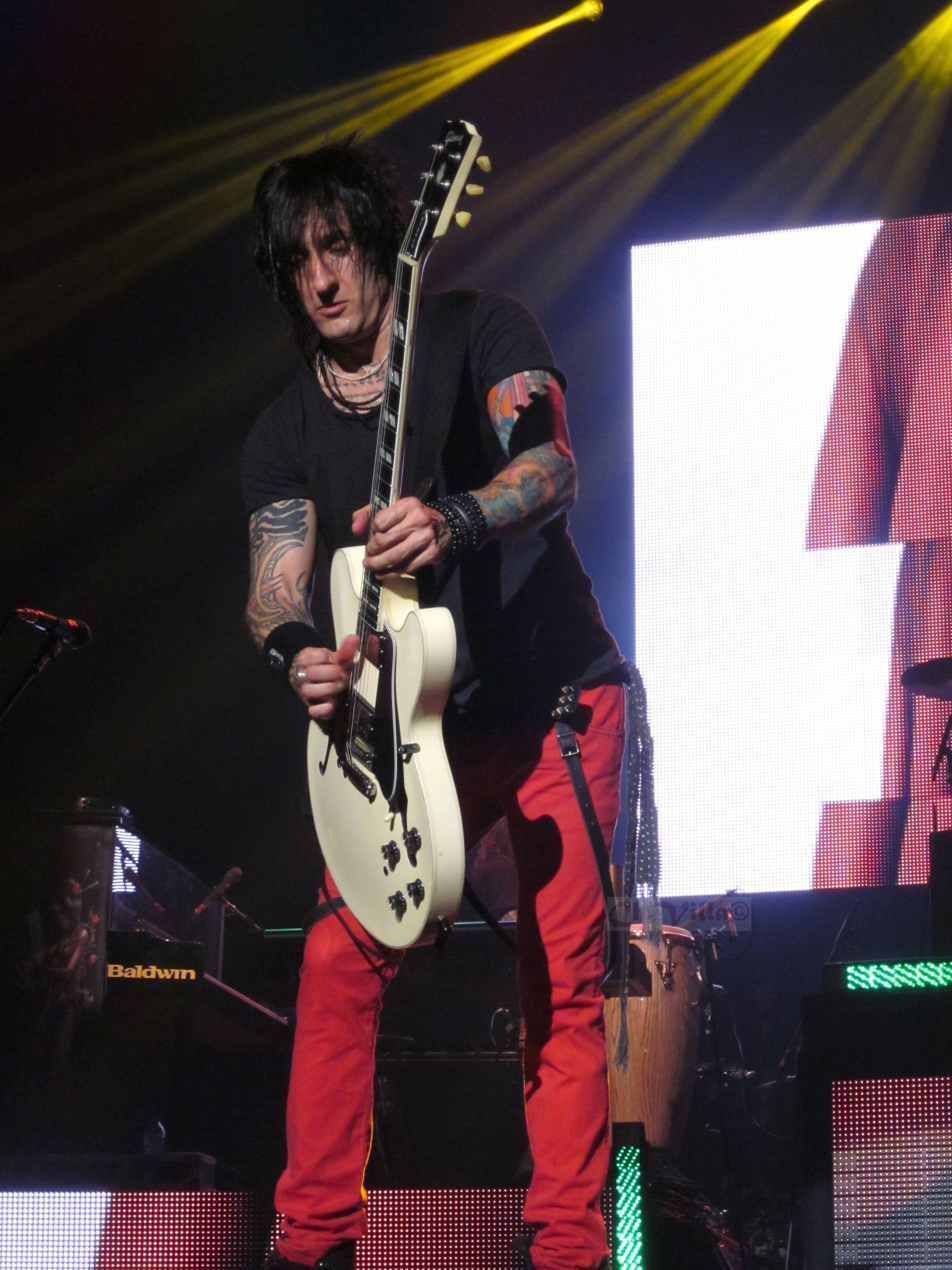
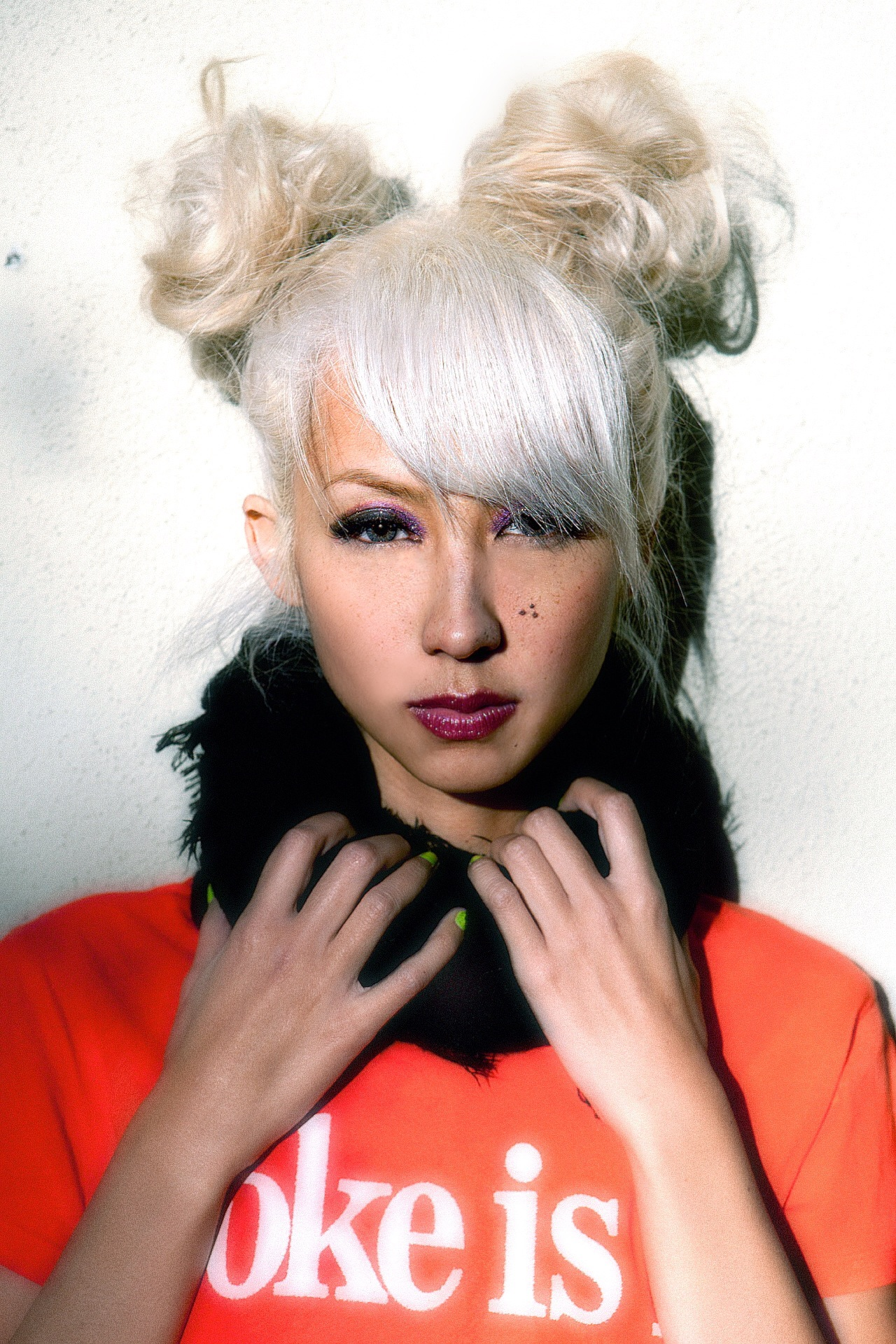
Keyboardist Dizzy Reed, drummer Frank Ferrer and guitarist Richard Fortus remain from the 2014 lineup, while keyboardist Melissa Reese joined the band in 2016, replacing Chris Pitman

=== Guns N' Roses ===
- Axl Rose – lead vocals, piano, whistle, whistling
- Slash – lead guitar, rhythm guitar, talkbox, slide guitar
- Duff McKagan – bass, backing vocals, lead vocals on Attitude cover
- Dizzy Reed – keyboards, piano, percussion, backing vocals
- Richard Fortus – rhythm guitar, lead guitar, backing vocals
- Frank Ferrer – drums, percussion
- Melissa Reese – keyboards, synthesizers, sub-bass, percussion, backing vocals

=== Guest appearances ===
- Sebastian Bach (performed "My Michelle" during the concert of April 9, 2016.)
- Angus Young (performed "Whole Lotta Rosie" and/or "Riff Raff" during the April 16, 2016, February 10, 11, 14, June 22 and concert of July 12, 2017.)
- Steven Adler (performed "Out Ta Get Me" and/or "My Michelle" during the July 6, 9, August 19, November 4 and concert of November 5, 2016.)
- Angry Anderson (performed "Nice Boys" during the concert of February 11, 2017.)
- P!nk (performed "Patience" during the concert of October 11, 2017.)
- Billy Gibbons (performed "Patience" during the concert of November 10, 2017.)
- Dave Grohl (performed "Paradise City" during the concert of November 14, 2017.)

== Concert broadcast and recordings ==
On April 8, 2016, before the first show at T-Mobile Arena in Las Vegas, Guns N' Roses posted a video in social media showing a recap of the event at the former Tower Records building and concert at the Troubadour in West Hollywood that took place a week earlier, on April 1. The three-minute video showed cuts from different songs played at the concert, as well as a time-lapse of the set-up of the Guns N' Roses museum that was temporarily placed inside the Tower Records building. Small snippets with comments from fans outside the museum was also featured in the clip.

The Coachella Festival had a live internet broadcast via YouTube of select performances during the first weekend of the festival. The Guns N' Roses concert was not shown in its entirety, but rather two songs from the set, namely "Welcome to the Jungle" and "November Rain". During the second weekend of the festival there was a 360° live feed from the festival, and again two songs from the Guns N' Roses set were selected for broadcast. This time they showed "November Rain" and "Knockin' on Heaven's Door".

A concert held at the Apollo Theater in New York City on July 20, 2017, was broadcast live in its entirety on SiriusXM satellite radio. The concert was an invite-only event where subscribers to the satellite radio service were eligible to win tickets. Similarly, the final show of the North American leg in 2017 in Inglewood, CA on November 29 was also broadcast on SiriusXM.

== Box office and reception ==
The first leg of the tour featured sold-out shows in West Hollywood, Las Vegas and Mexico City grossing a total of $15.5 million. In addition Guns N' Roses headlined one day each weekend of the Coachella Festival earning an unknown figure. On June 23, 2016, the second leg of the tour started, featuring stadiums in the United States as well as one show in Toronto, Ontario, Canada. The box office numbers reported for the leg added up to $116.8 million, with 12 of the total 25 performances being sold-out shows. The Latin American leg (Note: Excluding the two Mexico dates.) yielded up to a total gross of $56.5 million with more than 565,000 tickets sold. They played 13 shows in 11 cities, selling out 8 of them. By the end of 2016 the band had played for over 1.8 million people and grossed $192 million. The 2017 European and North American legs of the tour sold one million tickets just 24 hours after going on sale in late 2016. The tour was the highest earning per-city concert tour in 2016, making $5.5 million per show, as well as the fourth highest-grossing tour of 2016.

Additionally, the tour was the second highest grossing North American Tour (the highest grossing of any band) for 2016, grossing $130.8 million in North America. The shows at MetLife Stadium on July 23 and 24 were ranked as the 9th highest grossing of the year by Pollstar, earning a combined $11.2 million. In Australia and New Zealand, the sold-out shows amounted to over 350,000 tickets. During the first half of 2017 dates have grossed a total of $151.5 million, while the single biggest concert gross of the year, so far, is Guns N' Roses' London Stadium shows which sold 139,000 tickets and grossed $17.3 million over two nights. The tour has of now surpassed $480 million in gross revenue.

The tour was honored at the Billboard Touring Awards in November 2017, winning Top Tour/Top Draw and being nominated for Top Boxscore. The Tour was also nominated for Top Rock Tour at the 2017 Billboard Music Awards, with the band being nominated for Top Touring Artist and Top Duo/Group as well. In 2018, they were nominated for Top Touring artist and Top Rock Tour. The band also received the inaugural Ticketmaster Touring Milestone Award in 2019.

The tour wrapped up after 158 concerts with $584.2 million grossed and 5,371,891 tickets sold. It became third highest-grossing tour in the history of Billboard's Boxscore.

== Opening acts ==
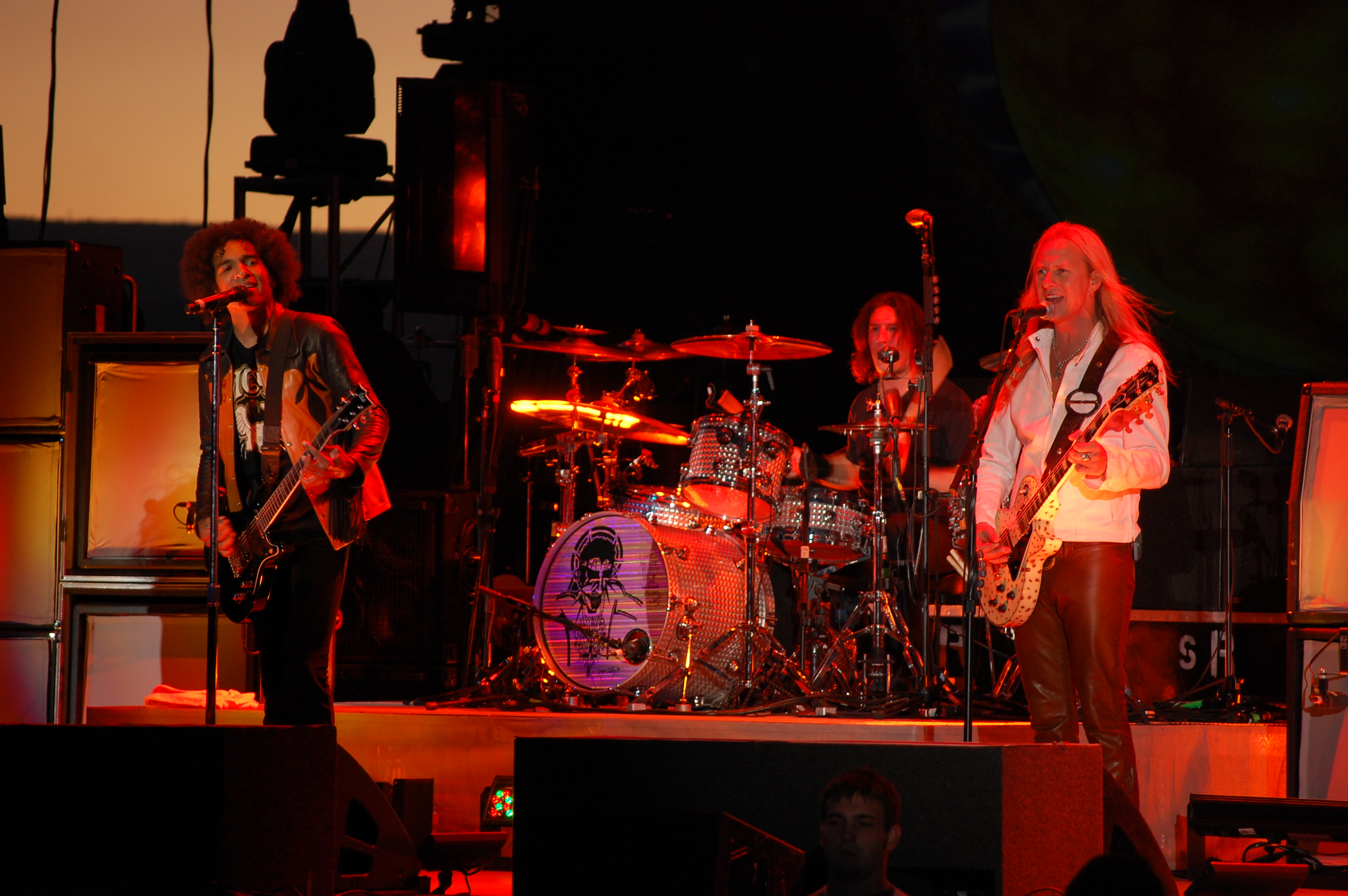
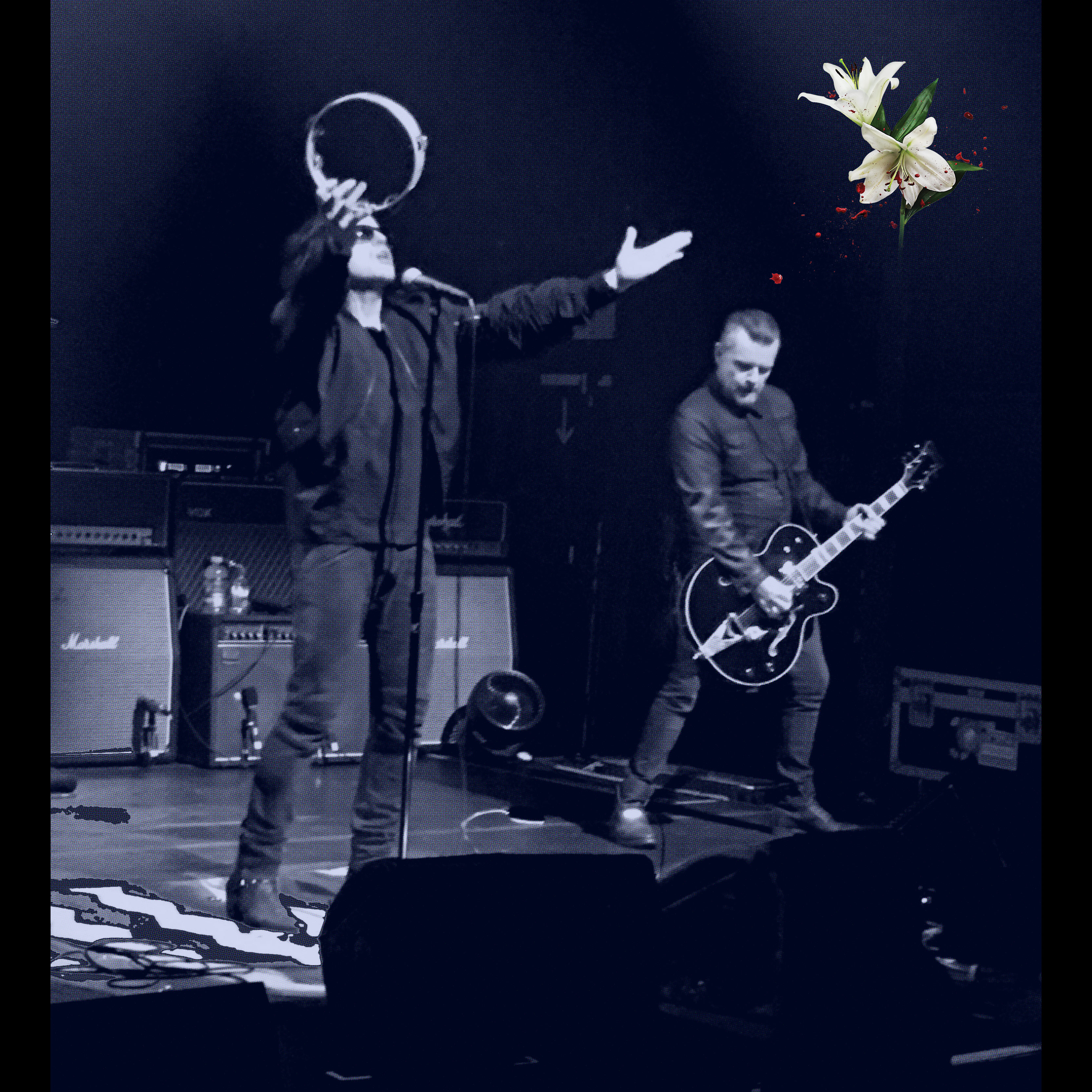
Alice in Chains and The Cult

Alice in Chains was the first band announced as an opening act on the tour. They played both of the Las Vegas shows in April 2016, while returning for select dates during the following summer leg of North America. Duff McKagan has ties with the band as he toured with them in 2006 and also expressing interest in writing a biography on them. Another band with previous ties with Guns N' Roses was selected for the Mexican dates in April – The Cult. As part of their Appetite for Destruction Tour, Guns N' Roses opened for The Cult for a whole North American leg in August and September 1987. A later drummer of The Cult, Matt Sorum, would eventually join Guns N' Roses in 1990 and stay until 1997. The Cult also returned to support the band during the summer of 2016.

Tyler Bryant & the Shakedown were selected for numerous dates both in North America and Singapore. Before opening for Guns N' Roses they had been the opening band for AC/DC during the European leg of their Rock or Bust Tour in which Axl Rose served as the replacement singer. Chris Stapleton was a surprising selection as opener for the Nashville show, as Guns N' Roses usually picks artists within the same music genre as themselves, though it proved a successful choice for the Tennessee audience. Wolfmother opened their first show on the tour on July 12 in Pittsburgh, and would continue to appear as a supporting act throughout the tour. The singer, Andrew Stockdale, has a past working relationship with Slash, appearing on the 2010 single "By The Sword" from Slash's first solo album.

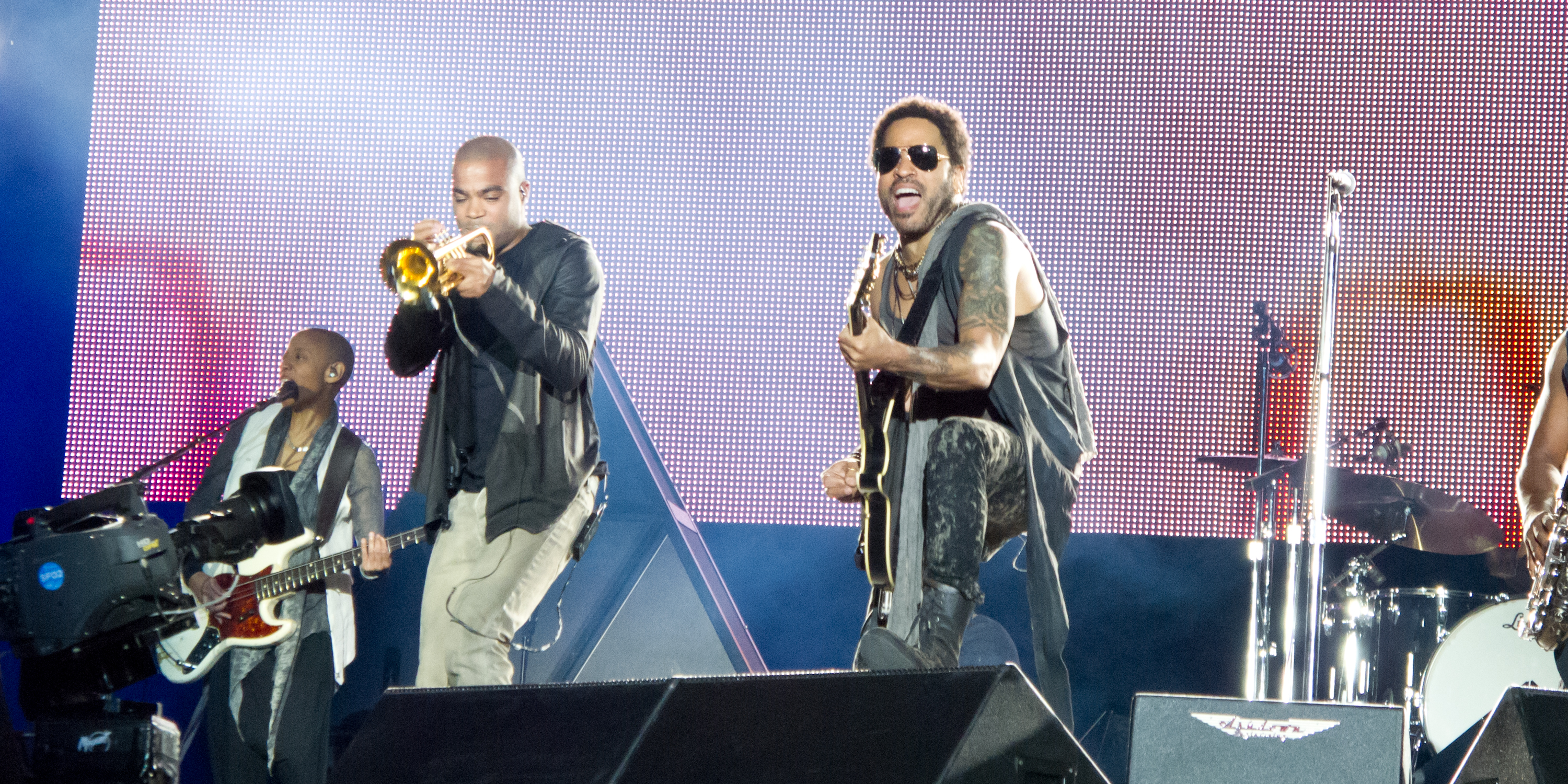
Lenny Kravitz live.

Canadian punk rock band Billy Talent opened the only Canada date in Toronto during the summer North American leg of the tour. For the two double shows in Foxborough and East Rutherford, long-time friend of the band Lenny Kravitz was the supporting act. Slash has recorded with Kravitz in the past, notably the first single from the album Mama Said, "Always on the Run". Kravitz has also appeared on stage with Guns N' Roses before, during the June 6, 1992 Use Your Illusion Tour stop in Paris, France, where they played the single live. The guitarist/singer was also spotted in the audience of Guns N' Roses' April 1 surprise show at the Troubadour, where he said that he had re-connected with the band.

Another unusual choice as opening act was Skrillex, who performed in Houston, Texas on August 5. British band The Struts was handpicked to open the show in San Francisco on August 9. Similarly to Guns N' Roses, the band lists Queen and The Rolling Stones as influences on their music. At McKagan's homecoming show in Seattle on August 12, his daughter Grace's band The Pink Slips opened the event alongside Alice in Chains. Zakk Wylde has ties to Guns N' Roses back to 1995 when he was in the studio with the band. He was chosen as opener on the show of August 15. Wylde had also previously played as a guest with Guns N' Roses on stage back in 2011, where he also performed as an opening act with his band Black Label Society.

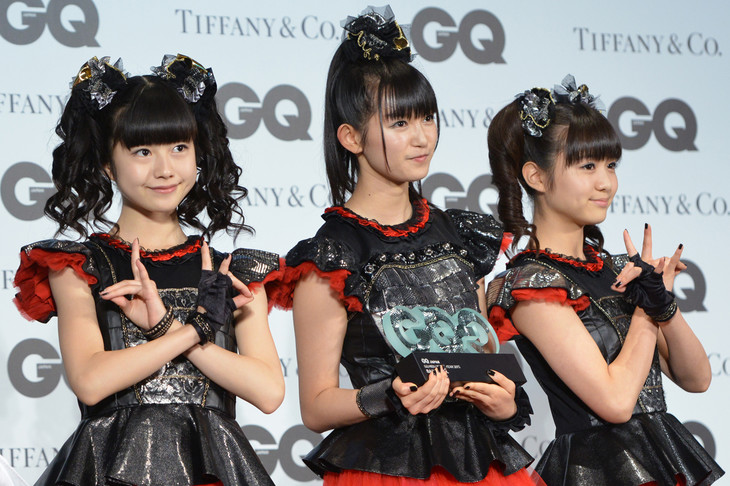
Japanese metal idol band Babymetal opened for Guns N' Roses in Japan.

For the Latin American leg of the tour, openings acts were usually regionally-based bands, including Plebe Rude, Airbag, and Massacre, among others. Marky Ramone and Tyler Bryant & the Shakedown also opened shows. Leg 4 of the tour saw most shows opened up by Wolfmother and/or Rose Tattoo, and Man with a Mission and Babymetal also opened shows.

Leg 5 saw support from Royal Blood, The Darkness, Mark Lanegan, Phil Campbell & The Bastard Sons, The Kills, Virgin, Killing Joke, Biffy Clyro, and Backyard Babies. Michael Monroe also supported, as well as Wolfmother and Tyler Bryant & the Shakedown.

Leg 6 featured Deftones, Sturgill Simpson, Live, Our Lady Peace, ZZ Top, The Kills and Royal Blood opening for the band. On Leg 7, The Who joined the band as co-headliners.

The eighth leg of the tour did not feature any opening acts, allowing the band to play earlier. Leg 9 of the tour featured returning opening act Tyler Bryant & the Shakedown, and new opening acts such as Volbeat, Gojira, Nothing More The Dead Daisies (a band Richard Fortus, Frank Ferrer and Dizzy Reed were previously a part of) Jonathan Davis of Korn, Ghost, Graveyard, Rival Sons Manic Street Preachers, Greta Van Fleet, Russian band Other Noises, and The Pink Slips

== Stage design and show production ==
Working on a tour that reunites the Guns N' Roses originals after over two decades was an opportunity that we couldn't miss.

— Matt Hales, Project Manager, TAIT,

Planning and preparation for the tour started in January 2016. TAIT Towers was brought in by long time client production manager Dale "Opie" Skjerseth to produce the stage and show itself. They have previously built and designed world tours with artists such as The Rolling Stones, Bon Jovi, U2, Madonna, and Taylor Swift.The set was designed by Phil Ealy, previously the light designer on the Use Your Illusion tour. They built a 71-foot (22 m) wide main stage including band risers, LED staircases made with P9 LED video tiles, LED fascia and amp stacks, and a self-climber piano lift used for Rose's performance of "November Rain." Additionally, they developed an 80-foot (24 m) automated video track truss system installed with power transmission units to automate Screenworks background video screens. TAIT Navigator, a proprietary automation platform, operated and controlled the self-climber piano lift as well as automated Screenworks' video screens into variations of three to six columns.

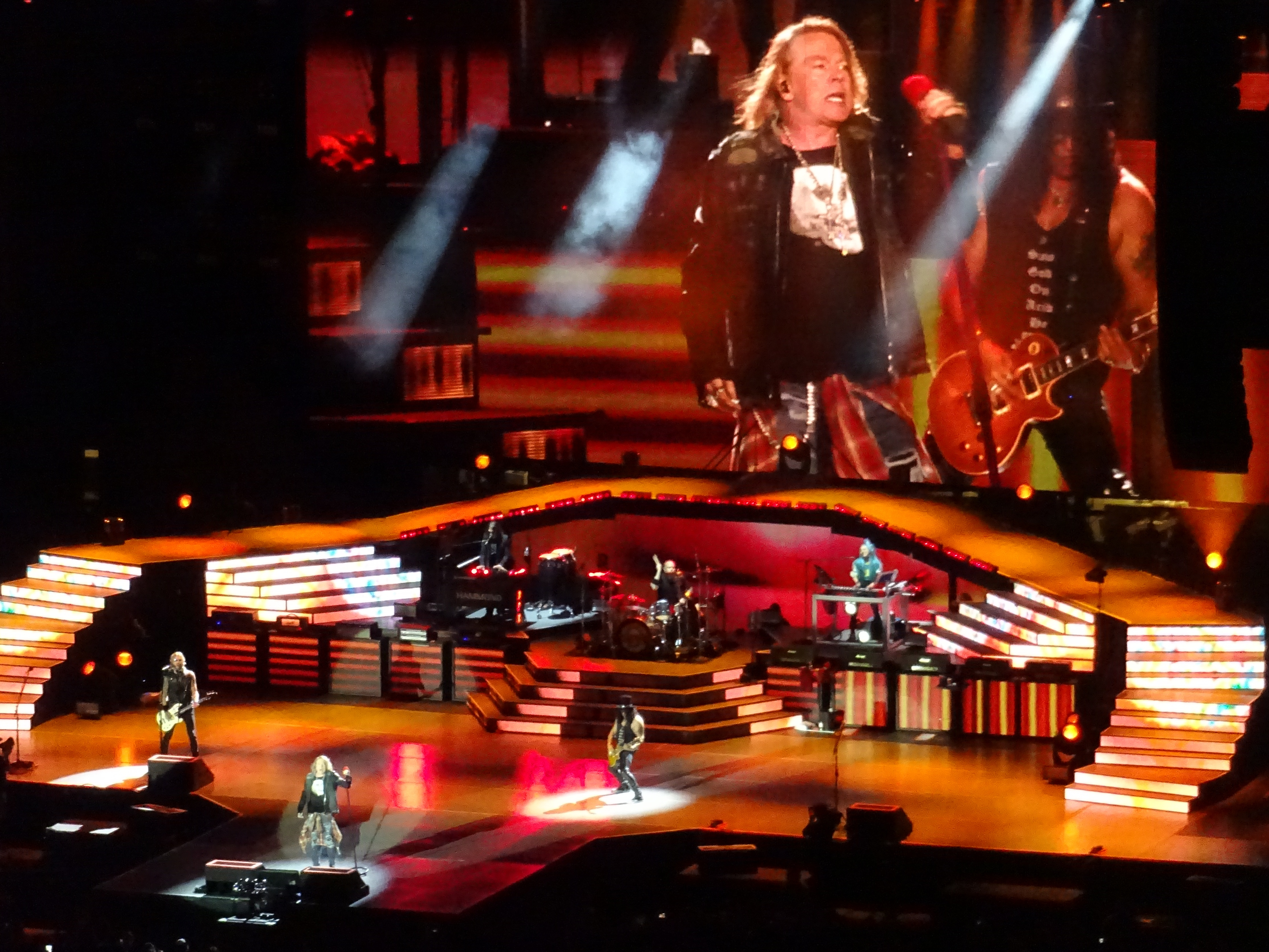
The band playing in Seattle, WA in August 2016, showing the stage setup.

The stage had staircases on each side as well as in the middle, leading up to the drum-kit. There was a walkway extending all the way around the drummer and two keyboardists, with staircases implemented into the riser, allowing the band members to freely move up amongst the keyboardists and the drummer during the show. At the center of the stage, there was a catwalk extending 28 feet (9 m) into the audience pit area hosting the self-climber piano lift. This catwalk was not assembled for the first seven shows as a result of Rose's foot injury and he was subsequently forced to have a seat on the main stage instead. An extensive lighting rig was assembled in the center stage area which featured Atomic 3000 LED and MAC III AirFX fixtures by Martin. The band members wanted a stage show experience similar to their Use Your Illusion tour, with updated technology. Each side of the stage had big LED video screens, primarily used to show close-ups of the band during the show. Roughly 250 professional and local crew members (125 of each) were needed to set up the staging, speakers and video boards. The setup process took three days and more than 20 production trucks to transfer from each city. Additionally there were three fleets of 16 steel trucks each, carrying the skeleton of the stage, making them able to set up the basis of the stage in three different venues at any time.

Motion graphics agency Creative Works London were brought back to do the visuals package for the stage show after having worked on the 2014 tours of South America and the Las Vegas residency. The new footage and graphics included familiar elements associated with many of the songs, like animations of old-school TV sets with the band members' skull drawings made famous by the cover of the Appetite For Destruction album. The TV sets were a throwback to the "Welcome to the Jungle" music video. "You Could Be Mine" graphics consisted of the band stylized as a resemblance to Terminators, influenced by the song having been used as the soundtrack on the Terminator 2: Judgment Day movie and original music video. Elements from the Chinese Democracy alternative art series were used in songs such as "Chinese Democracy" and "Catcher in the Rye". A set of changing backgrounds with rain and rose petals featured during "November Rain", whilst a black crow inspired from the official music video, was made to fly across the screens during "Don't Cry". Slash's signature skull with a top-hat, smoking a cigarette, was displayed on the main screen during his solo performance of "The Godfather theme", with a similar skull graphic during Duff's vocal performance. Pyrotechnics were used throughout the set, for a selection of songs.

The intro to the show featured either the classic Guns N' Roses bullet-logo made to look like a neon sign, blinking on the big screen on center stage, or an animated bullet-logo with the revolvers firing shots. The "Looney Tunes" intro theme played, and then the whole venue went dark with the theme from The Equalizer playing over the PA system for a few minutes before the band then started the first song of the set. The show ended with a considerable amount of pyrotechnics on stage, and confetti was shot out over the crowd during the ending of "Paradise City". When they played outdoor venues, an extensive fireworks display was added.

== Show overview ==
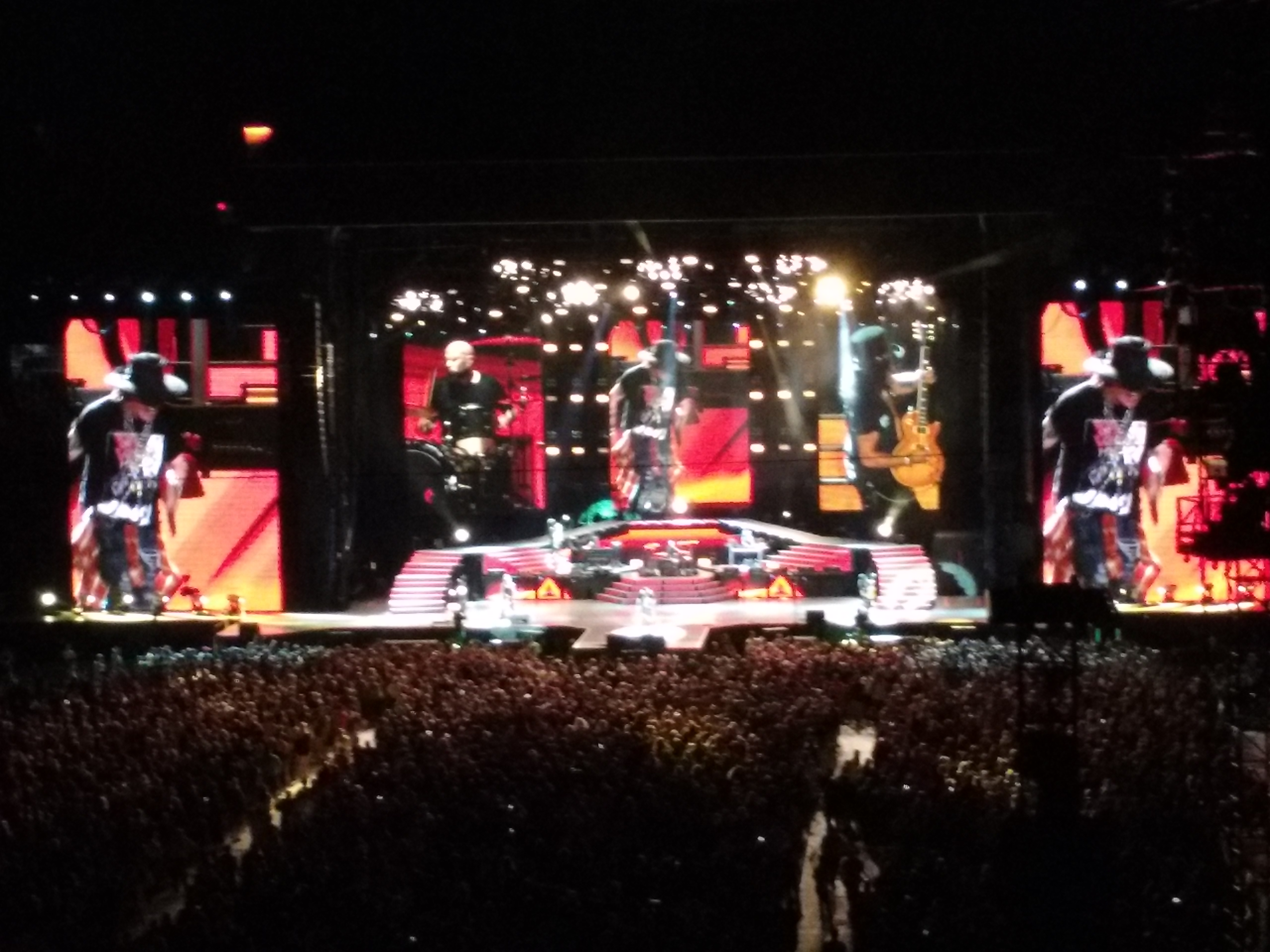
Guns N' Roses playing at Arrowhead Stadium on June 29, 2016.

As this was a semi-reunion of the "classic line-up" of Guns N' Roses, many were curious about which songs they would play at the concerts: fans speculated widely if they would add songs from the Use Your Illusion albums to their setlist, and if they would continue to play songs from their latest release, the 2008 album Chinese Democracy – which Slash and McKagan were not a part of creating or recording. McKagan had previously performed songs from Chinese Democracy with Guns N' Roses in 2014, when he stepped in as a substitute for Tommy Stinson while he was busy playing shows with The Replacements. After the first show – the surprise performance at the Troubadour – some questions were answered. They did bring back "Double Talkin' Jive" from Use Your Illusion I, while they also played tracks from Chinese Democracy, "Chinese Democracy" and "Better". This development continued at the first arena-sized show at T-Mobile Arena in Las Vegas where they further extended the setlist with songs like "Coma" and "This I Love", where the former had not been performed by the band since 1993. "The Godfather theme", which used to be a staple Slash solo number during past tours, was also brought back into the set. A few shows into the first leg, during the second show in Mexico City, they debuted "There Was a Time", another song from the Chinese Democracy album. "Sorry" and "Catcher in the Rye" were later debuted during shows in July. It is also notable that Slash had altered some guitar parts of the songs from this album. On June 3, 2018, the band debuted their cover of Velvet Revolver's "Slither", which Slash and McKagan created when they were in that group. While Slash and McKagan had played the song regularly since Velvet Revolver disbanded, this was the first time Guns N' Roses had performed it, and the first time Axl Rose had sung it. In a 2018 interview with Eddie Trunk, Slash revealed that they had rehearsed the song very early on in the tour, but simply did not play it at any concerts up until it was debuted. The song has since become a regular in the setlist, having been played at every 2018, 2019, and 2020 Guns N' Roses performance. On June 6, 2018, the band performed "Shadow Of Your Love", which had not been played since 1987. In the same Eddie Trunk interview, Slash revealed that releasing the song as a single and as part of the Appetite For Destruction "Locked N' Loaded" Box Set was what made them want to start playing it live again. While not played at every show, it was often played at Guns N' Roses performances from 2018 onward. On October 7, 2019, Guns N' Roses performed the Use Your Illusion II track "Locomotive", which had not been played live since 1992. Each time it was played, it replaced "Coma" as a lead-in to band member introductions and Slash's guitar solo. On October 23, 2019, the band played "Dead Horse", which Guns N' Roses had not played since 1993, although Duff McKagan had performed it as a solo act the previous summer. The band played it at every remaining show of the tour, and continued to include it in their 2020 performances.

=== Core set ===
The band continued, as they had done in past tours, to keep the core set which included their most well-known songs. The core set largely consisted of songs from their debut album Appetite For Destruction, namely "Welcome to the Jungle", "It's So Easy", "Nightrain", "Mr. Brownstone", "Paradise City", "Sweet Child o' Mine" and "Rocket Queen". The remaining core songs were tracks from the Use Your Illusion albums and Chinese Democracy. This included some of the aforementioned songs: the newly added "Double Talkin' Jive", as well as "Chinese Democracy", "Better" and "This I Love". In addition, "Live and Let Die", "November Rain", "Knockin' On Heaven's Door", "Estranged", and "You Could Be Mine" were played at every concert (except "November Rain" and "Estranged", which were not played at the shorter club show at the Troubadour).

=== Opening songs ===
In all tours from 2001 and on, Guns N' Roses had (with few exceptions) opened their show with either "Welcome to the Jungle" or "Chinese Democracy". For this tour, they changed things up, using the song "It's So Easy" as the opening song. "Chinese Democracy" and "Welcome to the Jungle" took the number 3 and 4 spots in the set, with "Mr. Brownstone" being the second song played, as was common during their older tours.

=== Solo spots ===
In past tours, an extensive number of solo spots were a usual part of the setlist. They cut this down to a minimum, keeping the set quite tight with the performance of regular songs as the main focus. Slash did have a solo spot with "The Godfather theme", a guitar instrumental piece with the rest of the band backing up and functioning as a lead-in to "Sweet Child o' Mine". As a second new addition, Fortus and Slash were doing a guitar instrumental version of the Pink Floyd song "Wish You Were Here", which worked as a prelude to "November Rain". McKagan took the lead vocals during a regular spot in the set, singing a song from the Guns N' Roses punk cover album "The Spaghetti Incident?". From show to show, he alternated between "New Rose" – the debut single of the British punk rock group The Damned, "Raw Power" – a song by Iggy Pop and the Stooges which he had previously performed at some of the Guns N' Roses shows in 2014, and "Attitude" – a Misfits song he played regularly on the Use Your Illusion Tour and in 2014.

=== Encore ===
The band ended their concerts with the song "Paradise City", but the total length of the encore set varied. The songs included in this set, with the exception of "Paradise City", were different ones from show to show, including "The Seeker", "Patience", "Don't Cry", "Yesterdays", "Used To Love Her", "Catcher In The Rye" and "Sorry" in various combinations.

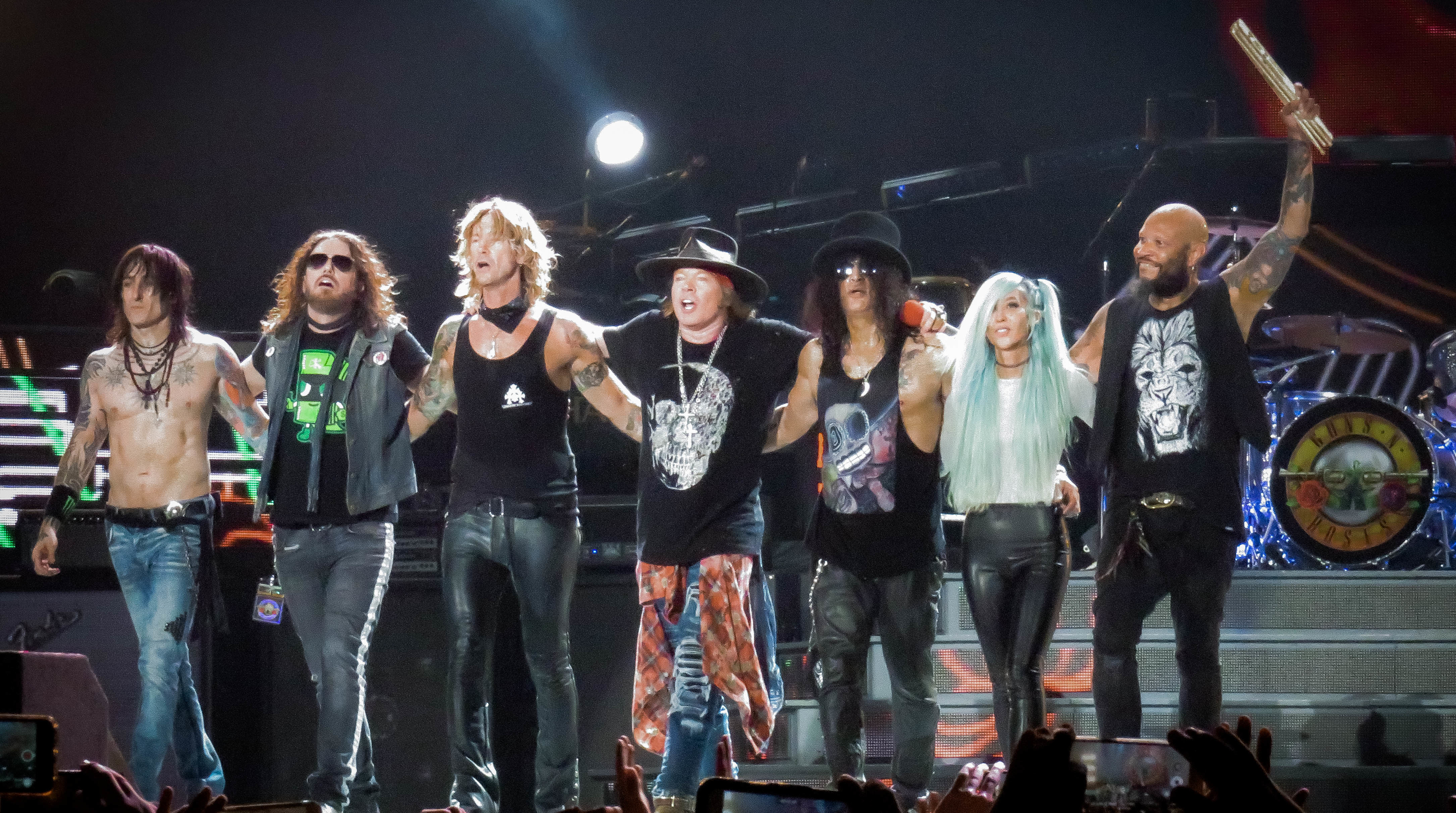
Guns N' Roses posing for a Curtain call after a concert in 2016.

== Tour dates ==
List of concerts, showing date, city, country, venue, opening act, tickets sold, number of available tickets and amount of gross revenue
Date	City	Country	Venue	Opening act(s)	Attendance	Revenue
Leg 1 – North America (warm-up)
April 1, 2016	West Hollywood	United States	The Troubadour	—N/a	500 / 500	$5,000
April 8, 2016	Las Vegas	United States	T-Mobile Arena	Alice in Chains	28,849 / 28,849	$6,265,076
April 9, 2016	Las Vegas	United States	T-Mobile Arena	Alice in Chains	28,849 / 28,849	$6,265,076
April 16, 2016 (Note: Coachella Festival)	Indio	United States	Coachella	—N/a	—N/a	—N/a
April 19, 2016	Mexico City	Mexico	Foro Sol	The Cult	131,198 / 131,198	$9,328,859
April 20, 2016	Mexico City	Mexico	Foro Sol	The Cult	131,198 / 131,198	$9,328,859
April 23, 2016	Indio	United States	Coachella	—N/a	—N/a	—N/a
Leg 2 – North America
June 23, 2016	Detroit	United States	Ford Field	Alice in Chains	44,439 / 44,439	$4,776,767
June 26, 2016	Landover	United States	FedExField	Alice in Chains	41,208 / 48,186	$4,107,027
June 29, 2016	Kansas City	United States	Arrowhead Stadium	Alice in Chains	40,387 / 49,385	$3,285,043
July 1, 2016	Chicago	United States	Soldier Field	Alice in Chains	82,172 / 96,088	$8,843,684
July 3, 2016	Chicago	United States	Soldier Field	Alice in Chains	82,172 / 96,088	$8,843,684
July 6, 2016	Cincinnati	United States	Paul Brown Stadium	Tyler Bryant & the Shakedown	32,516 / 33,845	$2,857,336
July 9, 2016	Nashville	United States	Nissan Stadium	Chris Stapleton	42,824 / 42,824	$4,765,878
July 12, 2016	Pittsburgh	United States	Heinz Field	Wolfmother	39,109 / 42,109	$3,810,026
July 14, 2016	Philadelphia	United States	Lincoln Financial Field	Wolfmother	49,328 / 49,328	$4,883,474
July 16, 2016	Toronto	Canada	Rogers Centre	Billy Talent	48,016 / 48,016	$5,370,460
July 19, 2016	Foxborough	United States	Gillette Stadium	Lenny Kravitz	65,472 / 71,099	$8,302,575
July 20, 2016	Foxborough	United States	Gillette Stadium	Lenny Kravitz	65,472 / 71,099	$8,302,575
July 23, 2016	East Rutherford	United States	MetLife Stadium	Lenny Kravitz	100,177 / 100,177	$11,687,391
July 24, 2016	East Rutherford	United States	MetLife Stadium	Lenny Kravitz	100,177 / 100,177	$11,687,391
July 27, 2016	Atlanta	United States	Georgia Dome	The Cult	41,508 / 41,508	$4,544,620
July 29, 2016	Orlando	United States	Camping World Stadium	The Cult	40,702 / 40,702	$5,852,060
July 31, 2016	New Orleans	United States	Mercedes-Benz Superdome	The Cult	32,894 / 40,215	$3,447,362
August 3, 2016	Arlington	United States	AT&T Stadium	The Cult	39,015 / 43,449	$4,786,948
August 5, 2016	Houston	United States	NRG Stadium	Skrillex	49,778 / 49,778	$6,166,657
August 9, 2016	San Francisco	United States	AT&T Park	The Struts	38,173 / 38,173	$5,597,843
August 12, 2016	Seattle	United States	CenturyLink Field	Alice in Chains; The Pink Slips	42,697 / 42,697	$5,237,966
August 15, 2016	Glendale	United States	University of Phoenix Stadium	Zakk Wylde; Tyler Bryant & the Shakedown	44,110 / 48,914	$4,257,189
August 18, 2016	Los Angeles	United States	Dodger Stadium	The Cult	84,634 / 87,917	$8,917,758
August 19, 2016	Los Angeles	United States	Dodger Stadium	The Cult	84,634 / 87,917	$8,917,758
August 22, 2016	San Diego	United States	Qualcomm Stadium	The Cult	49,458 / 49,458	$5,337,634
Leg 3 – Latin America
October 27, 2016	Lima	Peru	Estadio Monumental	Area 7	44,228 / 44,228	$4,066,300
October 29, 2016	Santiago	Chile	Estadio Nacional	Wild Parade	62,375 / 63,200	$6,540,250
November 1, 2016	Rosario	Argentina	Estadio Gigante de Arroyito	Cielo Razzo; Massacre	22,735 / 26,505	$2,778,110
November 4, 2016	Buenos Aires	Argentina	River Plate Stadium	Airbag	105,026 / 112,756	$11,042,300
November 5, 2016	Buenos Aires	Argentina	River Plate Stadium	Airbag	105,026 / 112,756	$11,042,300
November 8, 2016	Porto Alegre	Brazil	Estádio Beira-Rio	Scalene	50,567 / 50,567	$4,192,340
November 11, 2016	São Paulo	Brazil	Allianz Parque	Plebe Rude	93,600 / 93,600	$10,761,300
November 12, 2016	São Paulo	Brazil	Allianz Parque	Plebe Rude	93,600 / 93,600	$10,761,300
November 15, 2016	Rio de Janeiro	Brazil	Estádio Olímpico Nilton Santos	Plebe Rude	50,234 / 50,234	$3,581,510
November 17, 2016	Curitiba	Brazil	Pedreira Paulo Leminski	Plebe Rude	25,030 / 25,030	$2,638,780
November 20, 2016	Brasília	Brazil	Estádio Mané Garrincha	Plebe Rude	42,307 / 42,307	$2,981,050
November 23, 2016	Medellín	Colombia	Estadio Atanasio Girardot	Marky Ramone	39,511 / 39,511	$5,443,000
November 26, 2016	San José	Costa Rica	Estadio Nacional de Costa Rica	Gandhi	29,560 / 35,785	$2,520,280
November 29, 2016	Mexico City	Mexico	Palacio de los Deportes	Tyler Bryant & the Shakedown	32,935 / 40,530	$2,637,421
November 30, 2016	Mexico City	Mexico	Palacio de los Deportes	Tyler Bryant & the Shakedown	32,935 / 40,530	$2,637,421
Leg 4 – Asia / Oceania
January 21, 2017	Osaka	Japan	Kyocera Dome	Babymetal	25,000 / 25,000	$2,900,000
January 22, 2017	Kobe	Japan	World Memorial Hall	Babymetal	5,000 / 5,000	$615,000
January 25, 2017	Yokohama	Japan	Yokohama Arena	Babymetal	8,000 / 8,000	$1,000,000
January 28, 2017	Saitama	Japan	Saitama Super Arena	Man with a Mission	55,000 / 55,000	$7,460,000
January 29, 2017	Saitama	Japan	Saitama Super Arena	Babymetal	55,000 / 55,000	$7,460,000
February 2, 2017	Wellington	New Zealand	Westpac Stadium	Wolfmother	32,448 / 32,448	$3,617,500
February 4, 2017	Auckland	New Zealand	Western Springs Stadium	Wolfmother	48,118 / 48,118	$5,545,210
February 7, 2017	Brisbane	Australia	Queensland Sport and Athletics Centre	Rose Tattoo	39,459 / 39,459	$4,441,060
February 10, 2017	Sydney	Australia	ANZ Stadium	Rose Tattoo	84,277 / 84,277	$9,245,210
February 11, 2017	Sydney	Australia	ANZ Stadium	Wolfmother; Rose Tattoo	84,277 / 84,277	$9,245,210
February 14, 2017	Melbourne	Australia	Melbourne Cricket Ground	Wolfmother	73,756 / 73,756	$8,816,760
February 18, 2017	Adelaide	Australia	Adelaide Oval	Wolfmother	33,713 / 33,713	$3,541,050
February 21, 2017	Perth	Australia	Domain Stadium	Wolfmother	30,382 / 30,382	$3,084,270
February 25, 2017	Singapore		Changi Exhibition Centre	Tyler Bryant & the Shakedown; Wolfmother	50,088 / 50,088	$8,520,020
February 28, 2017	Bangkok	Thailand	SCG Stadium	—N/a	17,400 / 17,400	$2,830,000
March 3, 2017	Dubai	United Arab Emirates	Autism Rocks Arena	Point of View	26,502 / 26,502	$3,643,960
Leg 5 – Europe / Israel
May 27, 2017	Slane	Ireland	Slane Castle	Royal Blood; Mark Lanegan; Otherkin	79,258 / 79,258	$8,304,358
May 30, 2017	Bilbao	Spain	San Mamés Stadium	Mark Lanegan; Tyler Bryant & the Shakedown	27,955 / 31,000	$2,826,445
June 2, 2017	Lisbon	Portugal	Passeio Marítimo de Algés	Mark Lanegan; Tyler Bryant & the Shakedown	58,919 / 58,919	$4,796,915
June 4, 2017	Madrid	Spain	Vicente Calderón Stadium	Mark Lanegan; Tyler Bryant & the Shakedown	50,101 / 50,101	$4,799,188
June 7, 2017	Zurich	Switzerland	Letzigrund	The Darkness; Phil Campbell & The Bastard Sons	42,425 / 42,425	$5,607,649
June 10, 2017	Imola	Italy	Autodromo Enzo e Dino Ferrari	The Darkness; Phil Campbell & The Bastard Sons	78,438 / 78,438	$6,743,838
June 13, 2017	Munich	Germany	Olympiastadion	The Kills; Phil Campbell & The Bastard Sons	66,795 / 66,795	$7,669,807
June 16, 2017	London	England	London Stadium	The Kills; Tyler Bryant & the Shakedown	139,267 / 139,267	$17,171,304
June 17, 2017	London	England	London Stadium	The Kills; Tyler Bryant & the Shakedown	139,267 / 139,267	$17,171,304
June 20, 2017	Gdańsk	Poland	Stadion Energa	Killing Joke; Virgin	42,571 / 42,571	$3,385,282
June 22, 2017	Hanover	Germany	Hanover Fairground	Killing Joke; Phil Campbell & The Bastard Sons	70,015 / 70,015	$6,723,340
June 24, 2017 (Note: TW Classic. Also appearing at the festival: The Pretenders, Wolfmother, Channel Zero and Fleddy Melcully)	Werchter	Belgium	Werchter Festival Park	—N/a	58,011 / 58,011	$5,928,398
June 27, 2017	Copenhagen	Denmark	Telia Parken	Biffy Clyro; Backyard Babies	48,094 / 48,094	$5,000,715
June 29, 2017	Stockholm	Sweden	Friends Arena	The Darkness; Backyard Babies	53,654 / 53,654	$4,460,555
July 1, 2017	Hämeenlinna	Finland	Kantola Event Park	The Darkness; Michael Monroe	55,033 / 55,033	$5,567,242
July 4, 2017	Prague	Czech Republic	Letňany	Biffy Clyro	49,756 / 50,000	$4,375,544
July 7, 2017	Paris	France	Stade de France	Biffy Clyro; Tyler Bryant & the Shakedown	60,438 / 60,438	$5,439,491
July 10, 2017	Vienna	Austria	Ernst-Happel-Stadion	Wolfmother; Tyler Bryant & the Shakedown	54,847 / 54,847	$6,172,541
July 12, 2017	Nijmegen	Netherlands	Goffertpark	Biffy Clyro; Tyler Bryant & The Shakedown	65,101 / 65,101	$6,566,559
July 15, 2017	Tel Aviv	Israel	Yarkon Park	Tyler Bryant & the Shakedown; The Secret Saints	57,204 / 57,300	$6,761,681
Leg 6 – North America
July 20, 2017	New York City	United States	Apollo Theater	The Kills	—N/a	—N/a
July 27, 2017	St. Louis	United States	The Dome at America's Center	Deftones	36,382 / 41,158	$3,533,972
July 30, 2017	Minneapolis	United States	U.S. Bank Stadium	Deftones	48,740 / 48,740	$5,567,052
August 2, 2017	Denver	United States	Sports Authority Field at Mile High	Sturgill Simpson	41,445 / 44,806	$3,846,068
August 5, 2017	Little Rock	United States	War Memorial Stadium	Sturgill Simpson	26,400 / 33,102	$1,896,770
August 8, 2017	Miami	United States	Marlins Park	Sturgill Simpson	37,834 / 37,834	$4,102,883
August 11, 2017	Winston-Salem	United States	BB&T Field	Live	32,847 / 34,139	$3,447,947
August 13, 2017	Hershey	United States	Hersheypark Stadium	Live	31,087 / 31,087	$3,500,876
August 16, 2017	Orchard Park	United States	New Era Field	Live	32,245 / 35,630	$2,626,070
August 19, 2017	Montreal	Canada	Parc Jean Drapeau	Our Lady Peace	23,117 / 27,685	$2,539,510
August 21, 2017	Ottawa	Canada	TD Place Stadium	Our Lady Peace	21,204 / 25,714	$2,144,550
August 24, 2017	Winnipeg	Canada	Investors Group Field	Our Lady Peace	30,741 / 30,741	$3,008,250
August 27, 2017	Regina	Canada	Mosaic Stadium	Our Lady Peace	34,434 / 34,434	$3,463,640
August 30, 2017	Edmonton	Canada	Commonwealth Stadium	Our Lady Peace	44,393 / 46,656	$4,780,270
September 1, 2017	Vancouver	Canada	BC Place	Royal Blood	39,385 / 39,385	$4,039,950
September 3, 2017	George	United States	The Gorge Amphitheatre	Royal Blood	15,781 / 22,000	$1,653,890
September 6, 2017	El Paso	United States	Sun Bowl	ZZ Top	39,780 / 43,123	$3,087,980
September 8, 2017	San Antonio	United States	Alamodome	ZZ Top	38,490 / 41,387	$3,859,017
Leg 7 – Latin America
September 23, 2017 (Note: Rock in Rio. Also appearing at the festival: The Who, Incubus and Titãs)	Rio de Janeiro	Brazil	Barra Olympic Park	—N/a	—N/a	—N/a
September 26, 2017 (Note: São Paulo Trip. Also appearing at the festival: Alice Cooper)	São Paulo	Brazil	Allianz Parque	—N/a	—N/a	—N/a
September 29, 2017	Santiago	Chile	Estadio Monumental	The Who	42,743 / 42,743	$4,140,000
October 1, 2017	La Plata	Argentina	Estadio Ciudad de La Plata	The Who	45,000 / 45,000	$4,800,000
Leg 8 – North America
October 8, 2017	Philadelphia	United States	Wells Fargo Center	—N/a	—	—
October 11, 2017	New York City	United States	Madison Square Garden	—N/a	41,818 / 41,818	$6,160,000
October 12, 2017	Newark	United States	Prudential Center	—N/a	—	—
October 15, 2017	New York City	United States	Madison Square Garden	—N/a		
October 16, 2017	New York City	United States	Madison Square Garden	—N/a		
October 19, 2017	Washington, D.C.	United States	Capital One Arena	—N/a	—	—
October 22, 2017	Boston	United States	TD Garden	—N/a	—	—
October 23, 2017	Hartford	United States	XL Center	—N/a	—	—
October 26, 2017	Cleveland	United States	Quicken Loans Arena	—N/a	—	—
October 29, 2017	Toronto	Canada	Air Canada Centre	—N/a	25,724 / 25,724	$3,300,000
October 30, 2017	Toronto	Canada	Air Canada Centre	—N/a	25,724 / 25,724	$3,300,000
November 2, 2017	Detroit	United States	Little Caesars Arena	—N/a	—	—
November 3, 2017	Louisville	United States	KFC Yum! Center	—N/a	—	—
November 6, 2017	Chicago	United States	United Center	—N/a	—	—
November 7, 2017	Milwaukee	United States	BMO Harris Bradley Center	—N/a	9,723 / 10,426	$1,403,070
November 10, 2017	Houston	United States	Toyota Center	—N/a	10,523 / 10,523	$1,652,912
November 13, 2017	Nashville	United States	Bridgestone Arena	—N/a	10,592 / 10,592	$1,523,956
November 14, 2017	Tulsa	United States	BOK Center	—N/a	10,237 / 10,237	$1,349,098
November 17, 2017	Las Vegas	United States	T-Mobile Arena	—N/a	14,250 / 14,250	$2,104,371
November 18, 2017	Sacramento	United States	Golden 1 Center	—N/a	12,508 / 12,508	$1,691,893
November 21, 2017	Oakland	United States	Oracle Arena	—N/a	13,520 / 13,520	$1,866,854
November 24, 2017	Los Angeles	United States	Staples Center	—N/a	11,860 / 12,887	$1,806,668
November 25, 2017	Inglewood	United States	The Forum	—N/a	27,012 / 27,012 (Note: The score data is combined from the shows held at The Forum from November 25 & 29, 2017 respectively.)	$3,400,000
November 28, 2017	San Diego	United States	Valley View Casino Center	—N/a	6,886 / 7,969	$1,159,655
November 29, 2017	Inglewood	United States	The Forum	—N/a		
Leg 9 – Europe
June 3, 2018	Berlin	Germany	Olympiastadion	Manic Street Preachers; Greta Van Fleet	45,325 / 45,325	$4,689,975
June 6, 2018	Odense	Denmark	Dyrskuepladsen	Manic Street Preachers; Greta Van Fleet	33,379 / 33,379	$3,640,756
June 9, 2018 (Note: Download Festival)	Donington	England	Donington Park	—N/a	—N/a	—N/a
June 12, 2018	Gelsenkirchen	Germany	Veltins-Arena	Manic Street Preachers; The Pink Slips	33,788 / 33,788	$4,589,404
June 15, 2018 (Note: Firenze Rocks Festival)	Florence	Italy	Ippodromo del Visarno	—N/a	—N/a	—N/a
June 18, 2018 (Note: Download Festival France)	Paris	France	Brétigny-sur-Orge Air Base	—N/a	—N/a	—N/a
June 21, 2018 (Note: Graspop Metal Meeting)	Dessel	Belgium	Festivalpark Stenehei	—N/a	—N/a	—N/a
June 24, 2018	Mannheim	Germany	Maimarktgelände	Rival Sons; The Pink Slips	54,702 / 54,702	$5,110,455
June 26, 2018	Bordeaux	France	Matmut Atlantique	Rival Sons; The Pink Slips	29,389 / 29,389	$2,419,001
June 29, 2018 (Note: Download Festival Spain)	Madrid	Spain	Caja Mágica	—N/a	—N/a	—N/a
July 1, 2018	Barcelona	Spain	Estadi Olímpic Lluís Companys	Volbeat; Nothing More	48,649 / 48,649	$4,370,000
July 4, 2018	Nijmegen	Netherlands	Goffertpark	Volbeat; Gojira	45,319 / 45,319	$4,746,570
July 7, 2018	Leipzig	Germany	Leipziger Festwiese	Rival Sons; Tyler Bryant & the Shakedown	42,587 / 42,587	$3,675,788
July 9, 2018	Chorzów	Poland	Silesian Stadium	Volbeat; Tyler Bryant & the Shakedown	48,952 / 48,952	$3,901,072
July 13, 2018	Moscow	Russia	Otkritie Arena	Other Noises	—	—
July 16, 2018	Tallinn	Estonia	Tallinn Song Festival Grounds	Volbeat; The Dead Daisies	52,532 / 52,532	$11,145,958
July 19, 2018	Oslo	Norway	Valle Hovin	Ghost; Tyler Bryant & the Shakedown	39,902 / 39,902	$4,394,141
July 21, 2018	Gothenburg	Sweden	Ullevi Stadium	Graveyard; Tyler Bryant & the Shakedown	63,791 / 63,791	$5,520,341
July 24, 2018	Reykjavík	Iceland	Laugardalsvöllur	Tyler Bryant & the Shakedown	—	—
Leg 10 – Latin America / Asia / Africa / North America
November 3, 2018	Monterrey	Mexico	Parque Fundidora	—N/a	62,500 / 62,500	—
November 8, 2018	Jakarta	Indonesia	Gelora Bung Karno Stadium	—N/a	31,167 / 31,167	$2,504,246
November 11, 2018	Bocaue	Philippines	Philippine Arena	—N/a	24,638 / 30,220	$2,235,518
November 14, 2018	Kuala Lumpur	Malaysia	Sunway Lagoon	—N/a	—	—
November 17, 2018	Taoyuan	Taiwan	Taoyuan International Baseball Stadium	—N/a	20,360 / 20,360	$2,923,439
November 20, 2018	Hong Kong		AsiaWorld–Expo	—N/a	22,233 / 22,233	$4,068,475
November 21, 2018	Hong Kong		AsiaWorld–Expo	—N/a	22,233 / 22,233	$4,068,475
November 25, 2018 (Note: This show finished early because Axl became severely ill.)	Abu Dhabi	United Arab Emirates	du Arena	—N/a	31,500 / 31,500	$3,150,000
November 29, 2018	Johannesburg	South Africa	FNB Stadium	Wonderboom	52,042 / 59,603	$3,092,383
December 8, 2018	Honolulu	United States	Aloha Stadium	Kings of Spade	22,485 / 23,000	$2,113,556
Leg 11 – North America
September 21, 2019	Los Angeles	United States	Hollywood Palladium	—N/a	—	—
September 25, 2019	Charlotte	United States	Spectrum Center	Shooter Jennings	13,604 / 13,604	$1,999,538
September 28, 2019	Louisville	United States	Louder Than Life Festival	—N/a	—N/a	—N/a
October 1, 2019	Jacksonville	United States	VyStar Veterans Memorial Arena	Shooter Jennings	10,765 / 10,765	$1,645,694
October 4, 2019	Austin	United States	Austin City Limits Music Festival	—N/a	—N/a	—N/a
October 7, 2019	Wichita	United States	Intrust Bank Arena	Bishop Gunn	—	—
October 11, 2019	Austin	United States	Austin City Limits Music Festival	—N/a	—N/a	—N/a
October 13, 2019	Manchester	United States	Exit 111 Festival	—N/a	—N/a	—N/a
October 15, 2019	Lincoln	United States	Pinnacle Bank Arena	Blackberry Smoke	11,263 / 11,263	$1,378,675
October 18, 2019	Guadalajara	Mexico	Estadio Jalisco	—N/a	40,345 / 40,345	$3,623,129
October 20, 2019	Tijuana	Mexico	Estadio Caliente	—N/a	27,229 / 30,000	$2,734,260
October 23, 2019	Oklahoma City	United States	Chesapeake Energy Arena	Tyler Bryant & the Shakedown	10,905 / 10,905	$1,447,993
October 25, 2019	New Orleans	United States	Voodoo Music Festival	—N/a	—N/a	—N/a
October 29, 2019	Salt Lake City	United States	Vivint Smart Home Arena	Tyler Bryant & the Shakedown	11,084 / 11,084	$1,436,175
November 1, 2019	Las Vegas	United States	Colosseum at Caesars Palace	Dirty Honey	8,329 / 8,329	$2,796,945
November 2, 2019	Las Vegas	United States	Colosseum at Caesars Palace	Dirty Honey	8,329 / 8,329	$2,796,945
Total (Note: The total number of tickets sold/available and gross revenue up to November 29, 2017 (excluding the period of September 29 – November 6, 2017).)					4,189,774 / 4,328,230 (96.8%)	$449,997,783

== See also ==
- List of most-attended concert tours

== See also ==
- List of highest-grossing concert tours
- List of most-attended concert tours
