= Chinese Democracy (song) =

2008 single by Guns N' Roses

- artwork of the UK vinyl single release

Single by Guns N' Roses

from the album Chinese Democracy
- B-side: "Shackler's Revenge"
- Released: October 22, 2008
- Recorded: 1998–2007
- Genre: Hard rock; industrial rock
- Length: 4:43
- Label: Geffen
- Songwriters: Axl Rose; Josh Freese; Eric Caudieux; Caram Costanzo; Robin Finck; Dizzy Reed; Tommy Stinson; Paul Tobias
- Producers: Axl Rose; Caram Costanzo

Guns N' Roses singles chronology
"Oh My God" (1999)	"Chinese Democracy" (2008)	"Shadow of Your Love" (2018)

Audio sample
- "Chinese Democracy": file; help

Alternative cover
- Geffen version

"Chinese Democracy" is a song by the American hard rock band Guns N' Roses and the title track of their sixth studio album. The music was written by drummer Josh Freese and the lyrics and melody by vocalist Axl Rose, who said the song was prompted by the film Kundun and by time he spent in China. First performed live in January 2001, it was released to radio on October 22, 2008, and was the band's first official single since "Oh My God" (1999).

Lyrics referencing Falun Gong drew condemnation from Chinese state media; reports said the album was banned in China. The single received mixed to positive reviews. Critics praised its guitar riff and Rose's vocals, while others faulted its long ambient intro and lack of a conventional chorus. It has since placed in the middle of most rankings of the band's catalogue and has remained a fixture of the band's live sets.

Commercially, "Chinese Democracy" charted well in most territories. It topped the Norwegian Singles Chart, reached number 3 in Sweden and Finland, number 27 on the UK Singles Chart and number 34 on the Billboard Hot 100, and peaked at number 5 on the Mainstream Rock chart.

== Background and writing ==
Rose announced the album title in a November 1999 interview, saying: "There's a lot of Chinese democracy movements... It could also just be like an ironic statement. I don't know, I just like the sound of it." Freese said he wrote the music to the title track, calling its main riff "really dumb, simple, dirty", and that Rose wrote the lyrics. He said he wrote nothing else on the album, although he is credited with arrangements on several songs. ASCAP lists six further writers: Eric Caudieux, Caram Costanzo, Robin Finck, Dizzy Reed, Tommy Stinson and Paul Tobias. Freese said that after he left the band, others who suggested changes such as a faster tempo or a longer intro were given small shares of the publishing.

According to Classic Rock, Rose wrote the song after being moved by the final scenes of Martin Scorsese's Kundun, a film about the 14th Dalai Lama. Announcing the song at its January 1, 2001 debut in Las Vegas, Rose told the crowd:

...the movie Kundun was on about the Dalai Lama. [...] And the Dalai Lama is about to cross over the border to be in exile for the rest of his life from his own country. And he looks back at the men who helped him escape the Chinese government... and he sees every one of them dead. Because he knew that they would be killed and they knew that in helping him they would be killed. And, you know, the emotion in this next song, that's all that's about. It's not like an intelligent song. It doesn't have the answer to anything. But it's the title track of the record – which, God willing, we will finish – and it's not necessarily pro or con about China. It's just that right now China symbolizes one of the strongest, yet most oppressive countries and governments in the world, and we are fortunate to live in a free country.

MusicRadar likewise reported that Rose said at the 2001 show that the song was inspired by the film. The song was also inspired by the three months Rose spent in China.

== Recording and production ==
Recording of the album began in 1998 at Rumbo Recorders, and Rose recorded his final vocal tracks in January 2007. Rose's initial vocals for the song were recorded by producer Sean Beavan and engineered by Jeff "Critter" Newell, then re-edited and processed by Caram Costanzo, who produced the track with Rose. Beavan said he recorded Rose's vocals for the album in under a week, and most of those takes appear on the final release. A&R executive Tom Zutaut said that a completed version of the title track existed by 2001.

Freese left the band in 2000, and the album's drums were rerecorded, first with Brain and later with Frank Ferrer, who joined in 2006 and added new drum tracks. The booklet credits Ferrer as the only drummer on the track. Zutaut recalled that Rose sought the drum sound of Nirvana's Nevermind, and that it was achieved after the musicians listened to the album rather than relying on their memory of the radio hits. Four guitarists are credited on the song, with solos by Finck and Buckethead. Ron "Bumblefoot" Thal said he appears only on the rhythm track, where he added fretless guitar behind the verses. The intro is credited to Caudieux and Costanzo, and Chris Pitman is credited with additional guitar processing. Classic Rock called it possibly "the record's most collaborative track", noting its two backing vocalists, three keyboard players and "no fewer than five" guitarists.

== Composition and lyrics ==
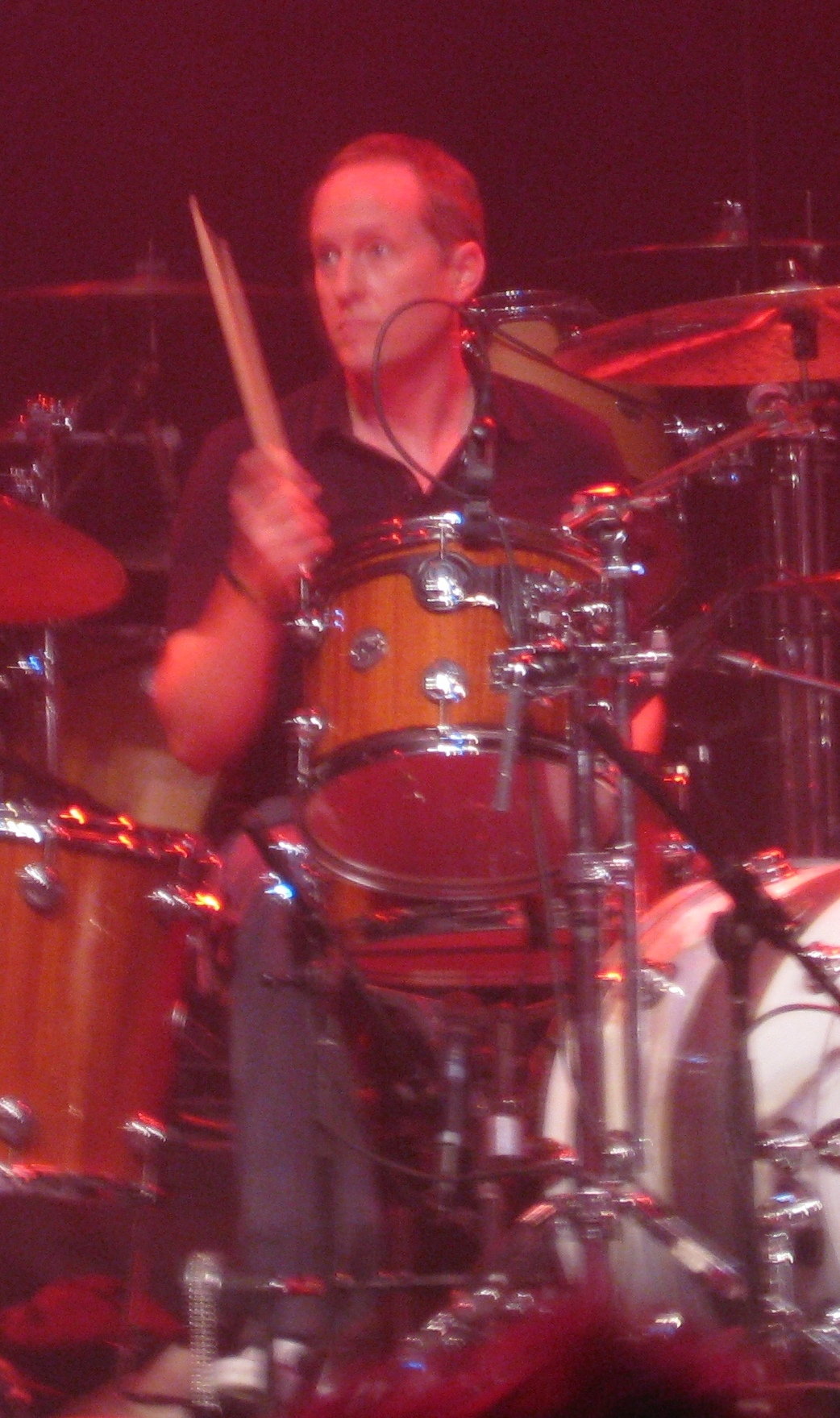
Drummer Josh Freese wrote the music to the track, while vocalist Axl Rose wrote the lyrics

"Chinese Democracy" is a hard rock song with industrial and electronic elements. Entertainment Weekly called it a "hard-rock song", and the Los Angeles Times heard Nine Inch Nails in its more aggressive moments. Spin said the music "toggles between two primary modes: grinding industrial rock and keys-and-strings balladry", and The Observer described "Nine Inch Nails-style industrial rock". Pitchfork described the track as "modern rock rendered in such operatic largesse", and Rolling Stone later said it and "Better" were "thick with electronic instrumentation and 21st-century production flourishes". Zutaut, by contrast, said that "the song that sounded the most like traditional Guns N' Roses was the title track".

The track opens with about a minute of sound effects before the main riff; Spin described the opening as "muffled voices, ominous drums, and plinky Edge-ish guitar", and Metal Injection noted a delayed intro of ambient noise and guitar lines. Freese said he thought the intro was lengthened after he left the band, and called the song "a simple bonehead rock song with a big riff" that he assumed would be "perfect for Guitar Hero one day". Spin called the main riff "four-chord", while Freese has said the song is "just three chords" with "a cool groove" that is "kind of dirty and rocking". The verses use double-tracked vocals, "half high-pitched Axl, half guttural, growly Axl", and the chorus is an extension of the verses rather than a distinct section. Two guitar solos follow, by Finck and then Buckethead, the first arriving just after the three-minute mark. The song runs 4:43. Glide described the title track as "a mash-up of voices (perhaps in Axl's head?) spouting half-cocked ideas over scattered guitars". Spin described the guitar work of Buckethead and Finck as Tom Morello-influenced.

The lyrics are built around the refrain "It don't really matter" and include references to "missionaries", a "Chinese stew", the Falun Gong, an "iron fist" and a "great wall". In an essay in an alternate "art edition" booklet, Rose wrote that the song, "in its irreverence, is for positive purposes and communication with all segments of society", and that after visiting Hong Kong and mainland China he had witnessed fear in the people around him rather than feeling it himself. He wrote that his use of the words "Chinese" and "Democracy" was intentional, but that he did not "purport to know what system of government is best for the people of China". Speaking in 2016, Rose said the title was not meant to tell China what government to have, and that what struck him most during his stay was that people everywhere were frightened to hold opinions that deviated from the government's. The Los Angeles Times called the song "a protest song about Chinese state oppression" and, "more important", "a spit back at the audience that's been waiting" for the album, while Entertainment Weekly called the lyrics "cryptic, vaguely-but-not-really-political".

== Release and promotion ==
The song was released to U.S. radio on October 22, 2008, with stations able to download it from 5 a.m. Eastern Time, and rock stations across the country added it to their playlists that morning. The single was backed with "Shackler's Revenge". It was the band's first official single since "Oh My God" in 1999. The album followed on November 23, 2008.

The Global Times, a newspaper owned by the Chinese Communist Party, called the album a "venomous attack" on China that "turns its spear point on China", and Chinese editions of the album do not include the title track. The album was widely reported to have been banned in China.

The song was the official theme of WWE's Armageddon pay-per-view in December 2008, an announcement WWE made on November 25.

== Critical reception ==
=== Contemporary reviews ===
The single received mixed to positive reviews. Asked whether it was "as bad as we all assume", Spin's Steve Kandell answered, "Kinda, but then again, not really!" He wrote that with "a thick, muscular four-chord riff and that Axl banshee wail, only the most stubbornly jaded will manage to suppress the goosebump reflex", but criticized it for being "utterly and completely hook-free".

Ann Powers of the Los Angeles Times described Rose as "the most ambitious hard rocker of the late 20th century" and, though noting that "the chorus is just an extension of the verses" and that the song therefore "doesn't behave the way radio-friendly singles usually do", still stated that "the refrain sticks after several listens". She likened Rose's anger to that of "Get in the Ring" and "You Could Be Mine", called the sound "Blade Runner rock" and concluded that the song "brings back a passionate weirdness that the hard rock airwaves have lacked". She also compared it to David Bowie's "I'm Afraid of Americans", writing that "Both songs have a suffocated quality, as if their makers are pushing through smoke to express these thoughts. It's the sound of florid, romantic rockers aiming for something cold and modern".

Entertainment Weekly's Popwatch blog said that not "even the greatest GNR song ever conceived could possibly be worth so sustained a buildup". Chris Willman wrote that the chorus "feels like the buildup to a great refrain, but turns out to really be the refrain", and that the solo, though "nice", was "not nearly the catharsis the song seems (or needs) to be building toward". GQ suggested that, judging amongst the leaked songs, "Chinese Democracy" was a curious choice for lead single, and that "Madagascar" or "There Was a Time" would have been superior.

Album reviews also addressed the track. David Fricke of Rolling Stone cited "the stabbing-dagger lick that opens" the song as an example of the album's "familiar guitar firepower". Greg Kot of the Chicago Tribune wrote that it "lacks a hook, but it does drop some monster guitar chords". Chuck Klosterman of The A.V. Club named the title track and "I.R.S." as "the album's two strongest rock cuts", where Rose briefly balanced the many elements he tends to pile into each song. Luke Turner of The Quietus thought the opening's "mighty portents of doom" promised more than the "rather straight-forward riff" that followed, but called it "a solid start", and Raoul Hernandez of The Austin Chronicle felt it "might have been mined off Use Your Illusion", opening as "lean and leathery as 'You Could Be Mine'". Pitchfork was more critical, saying the track opens on a "seemingly-interminable fade-in" before pummeling the listener with "brickwalled, textureless power chords", and calling it "insubstantial, a middle-aged symphony to nowhere".

The then-former Guns N' Roses guitarist Slash reacted positively to the song upon release, saying on Boston's WBCN, "That sounds cool. It's good to hear [Axl Rose's] voice, you know?" Former drummer Matt Sorum said he was "pleasantly surprised" by the single, and that he liked the way it was mixed. Former bassist Duff McKagan said he first heard the song at the gym and did not analyze it, adding that he had shared "a big part of my life" with Rose but that "that was a long time ago for me".

=== Retrospective assessments ===
Writing in Metal Hammer in 2018, Merlin Alderslade described the song as a snarling, proudly messy rocker built on a riff "dragged straight out of an LA gutter". Classic Rock called it "a riotous, full-throttle rager" and, while "no Welcome to the Jungle", a strong album opener. In 2025, American Songwriter said it was "one you crank when the opening riff kicks in".

Rankings of the band's songs have generally placed it in the middle. Loudwire ranked it 22nd of 70 songs in 2024, the highest-placed track from Chinese Democracy on its list; The Guardian placed it 15th on its list of the band's 20 greatest songs, again the highest-ranked song from the album. Spin (36th of 79), MetalSucks (39th of 81) and Ultimate Classic Rock (44th of 84) placed it in the middle of full-catalogue lists, while LA Weekly ranked it 48th of 64. On shorter lists, Classic Rock placed it 46th of 50 and Yahoo Entertainment placed it last in a list of 11 top tracks.

Select rankings of "Chinese Democracy"
Publication	List	Year	Rank	Ref.
Spin	Every Guns N' Roses Song, Ranked	2016	36 of 79	
LA Weekly	The Ultimate Ranking of Every Guns N' Roses Song	2016	48 of 64	
MetalSucks	All 81 Guns N' Roses Songs, Ranked From Worst to Best	2022	39 of 81	
The Guardian	Guns N' Roses – their 20 greatest songs, ranked!	2022	15 of 20	
Classic Rock	The 50 greatest Guns N' Roses songs ever, and the stories behind them	2023	46 of 50	
Ultimate Classic Rock	All 84 Guns N' Roses Songs Ranked Worst to Best	2024	44 of 84	
Yahoo Entertainment	Guns N' Roses Greatest Hits: 11 Top Tracks	2024	11 of 11	
Loudwire	Every Guns N' Roses Song Ranked Worst to Best	2024	22 of 70	

== Live performances ==
"Chinese Democracy" was first performed on January 1, 2001, at the House of Blues in Las Vegas, the band's first show since July 1993. It was one of four songs from the album sessions debuted that night, alongside "Riad N' the Bedouins", "The Blues" (later "Street of Dreams") and "Silkworms" (later "Absurd"), and was followed by a solo from Buckethead. It was played again at the band's Rock in Rio set later that month, where Rolling Stone called the "kicking" title track and "Madagascar" highlights of the show. It remained in the band's sets on the Chinese Democracy Tour, which ran in legs between 2001 and 2011. At a November 2011 show, the Star Tribune reported that the title track opened the set before giving way to "Welcome to the Jungle". Stinson named it as one of his favorite songs to play live, calling it "pretty much fun to play" and "a double barn burner". A performance recorded in November 2012 at The Joint at the Hard Rock Hotel and Casino in Las Vegas, part of the Appetite for Democracy residency, appears on the concert film Appetite for Democracy 3D, released in 2014.

The song stayed in the set when Slash and McKagan rejoined for the Not in This Lifetime... Tour in 2016. In July 2016, Rolling Stone counted it among three Chinese Democracy tracks that had become staples of the reunion setlists, alongside "This I Love" and "Better". Slash said in 2018 that he had adapted his own way of playing the Chinese Democracy songs "without losing the integrity of how the guitar parts go", adding that the loves playing the title track. Brain said that Rose told him he was incorporating Slash's playing into the songs, including a new breakdown in a different section of "Chinese Democracy". In 2026, Loudwire described the title track and "Better" as "usually staples" of the band's shows since the reunion.

== Personnel ==
Credits are adapted from the album's liner notes.

Guns N' Roses

- Axl Rose – lead vocals, keyboards, arrangement, digital editing, production, mixing
- Paul Tobias – guitars, arrangement
- Robin Finck – guitars, guitar solos, additional arrangements
- Buckethead – guitars, guitar solos, additional arrangements
- Ron "Bumblefoot" Thal – guitars, additional arrangements
- Tommy Stinson – bass, backing vocals, additional arrangements
- Frank Ferrer – drums, additional arrangements
- Dizzy Reed – keyboards, backing vocals
- Chris Pitman – keyboards, sub-bass, additional guitar processing, additional production

Technical personnel

- Caram Costanzo – production, engineering, mixing, digital editing, intro
- Eric Caudieux – intro, digital editing, additional production, Pro Tools engineering
- Sean Beavan – arrangement, digital editing, recording of Rose's initial vocals
- Jeff "Critter" Newell – engineering of Rose's initial vocals
- Roy Thomas Baker – additional production and preproduction
- Andy Wallace – mixing
- John O'Mahony – Pro Tools mixing
- Bob Ludwig – mastering

== Chart performance ==
"Chinese Democracy" reached number 1 in Norway and number 3 in Sweden and Finland. It also peaked at number 7 in Italy, number 11 in Switzerland and number 15 in the Netherlands, and at number 18 on Billboard's Euro Digital Song Sales chart. It reached number 23 in Denmark, number 26 in Austria, number 27 in Flanders and New Zealand, number 32 in Wallonia and Ireland, number 38 in Germany and number 54 in Australia. In the United Kingdom, it peaked at number 27. In North America, it reached number 10 in Canada (number 4 on Canada Rock), number 34 on the Billboard Hot 100, number 24 on Alternative Songs and number 5 on Mainstream Rock.

=== Weekly charts ===
Chart (2008)	Peak position
Australia (ARIA Charts)	54
Austria (Ö3 Austria Top 40)	26
Belgium (Ultratop 50 Flanders)	27
Belgium (Ultratop 50 Wallonia)	32
Canada Hot 100 (Billboard)	10
Canada Rock (Billboard)	4
Denmark (Tracklisten)	23
Euro Digital Song Sales (Billboard)	18
Finland (Suomen virallinen lista)	3
Germany (GfK)	38
Ireland (IRMA)	32
Italy (FIMI)	7
Netherlands (Single Top 100)	15
New Zealand (Recorded Music NZ)	27
Norway (VG-lista)	1
Sweden (Sverigetopplistan)	3
Switzerland (Schweizer Hitparade)	11
UK Singles (Official Charts)	27
US Billboard Hot 100	34
US Alternative Airplay (Billboard)	24
US Mainstream Rock Airplay (Billboard)	5

=== Certifications ===
Certifications for "Chinese Democracy"
Region	Certification	Certified units/sales
Brazil (Pro-Música Brasil)	Gold	30,000^{‡}
^{‡} Sales+streaming figures based on certification alone.
