= Appetite for Democracy (tour) =

2012–14 concert tour by Guns N' Roses

- Tour by Guns N' Roses
- Poster for the November 21st show at the Hard Rock Hotel and Casino
- Location: Asia; North America; Oceania; South America
- Start date: October 31, 2012
- End date: June 7, 2014
- Legs: 7
- No. of shows: 42

Guns N' Roses concert chronology
- Up Close and Personal Tour (2012); Appetite for Democracy (2012–2014); Not in This Lifetime... Tour (2016–2019)

Appetite for Democracy was a series of concerts by the American hard rock band Guns N' Roses celebrating 25 years of Appetite for Destruction, and four years for their studio album Chinese Democracy. It started with a 12-night residency in Las Vegas. Their previous tour, Up Close and Personal, had ended in Spain on July 22, 2012. Former bassist Duff McKagan filled in for Tommy Stinson for several shows, as Stinson had previous commitments to The Replacements. The tour ended with another residency in Vegas, titled "No Trickery! An Evening of Destruction!". The title of the show, "No Trickery" was a play on jokes Axl Rose had made about Red Hot Chili Peppers being forced to pantomime their performance at the Super Bowl XLVIII halftime show.

== Tour dates ==
Date	City	Country	Venue
Appetite for Democracy Las Vegas Residency
October 31, 2012	Las Vegas	United States	The Joint
November 2, 2012	Las Vegas	United States	The Joint
November 3, 2012	Las Vegas	United States	The Joint
November 7, 2012	Las Vegas	United States	The Joint
November 9, 2012	Las Vegas	United States	The Joint
November 10, 2012	Las Vegas	United States	The Joint
November 14, 2012	Las Vegas	United States	The Joint
November 17, 2012	Las Vegas	United States	The Joint
November 18, 2012	Las Vegas	United States	The Joint
November 21, 2012^{[H]}	Las Vegas	United States	The Joint
November 23, 2012	Las Vegas	United States	The Joint
November 24, 2012	Las Vegas	United States	The Joint
Asia
December 7, 2012	Bangalore	India	Bhartiya City
December 9, 2012	Mumbai	India	MMRDA Grounds
December 12, 2012	Delhi	India	Leisure Valley Gurgaon
December 16, 2012	Jakarta	Indonesia	Mata Elang International Stadium
December 18, 2012	Tokyo	Japan	Zepp Tokyo
North America
February 13, 2013^{[A]}	Los Angeles	United States	Soho House
Oceania
March 9, 2013	Perth	Australia	Perth Arena
March 12, 2013	Sydney	Australia	Allphones Arena
March 13, 2013	Newcastle	Australia	Newcastle Entertainment Centre
March 16, 2013	Melbourne	Australia	Sidney Myer Music Bowl
March 17, 2013	Melbourne	Australia	Sidney Myer Music Bowl
March 20, 2013	Brisbane	Australia	Brisbane Entertainment Centre
Asia
March 24, 2013^{[B]}	Sepang	Malaysia	Sepang International Circuit
Middle East
March 28, 2013	Abu Dhabi	United Arab Emirates	du Arena
March 30, 2013	Beirut	Lebanon	Forum de Beirut
North America
May 24, 2013^{[C]}	Pryor Creek	United States	Pryor Creek Festival Grounds
May 26, 2013^{[D]}	San Antonio	United States	AT&T Center
May 28, 2013	Houston	United States	House of Blues
May 29, 2013	Dallas	United States	House of Blues
June 1, 2013	Lubbock	United States	Lonestar Pavilion
June 2, 2013	Kansas City	United States	Midland Theatre
June 5, 2013	Buffalo	United States	Outer Buffalo Harbor
June 6, 2013	New York City	United States	Brooklyn Bowl
June 8, 2013^{[E]}	New York City	United States	Randall's Island
July 12, 2013	Quebec	Canada	Festival d'été de Québec
July 14, 2013	Montreal	Canada	Métropolis
July 17, 2013	Toronto	Canada	Sound Academy
Latin America
March 20, 2014	Rio de Janeiro	Brazil	HSBC Arena
March 22, 2014	Belo Horizonte	Brazil	Mineirão
March 25, 2014	Brasília	Brazil	Ginásio Nilson Nelson
March 28, 2014	São Paulo	Brazil	Anhembi Convention Center
March 30, 2014	Curitiba	Brazil	Vila Capanema Stadium
April 1, 2014	Florianópolis	Brazil	Stage Music Park
April 3, 2014	Porto Alegre	Brazil	Fiergs Pavilion
April 6, 2014	Buenos Aires	Argentina	Ferro Stadium
April 9, 2014	Asunción	Paraguay	Hipódromo de Asunción
April 12, 2014	La Paz	Bolivia	Estadio Hernando Siles
April 15, 2014	Recife	Brazil	Chevrolet Hall
April 17, 2014	Fortaleza	Brazil	Centro de Eventos do Ceará
North America
April 23, 2014	Los Angeles	United States	Club Nokia^{[F]}
May 13, 2014	Bethlehem	United States	Sands Bethlehem Event Center
May 16, 2014^{[G]}	Columbus	United States	Columbus Crew Stadium
No Trickery! An Evening of Destruction Vegas Residency
May 21, 2014	Las Vegas	United States	The Joint
May 24, 2014	Las Vegas	United States	The Joint
May 25, 2014	Las Vegas	United States	The Joint
May 28, 2014	Las Vegas	United States	The Joint
May 30, 2014	Las Vegas	United States	The Joint
May 31, 2014	Las Vegas	United States	The Joint
June 4, 2014	Las Vegas	United States	The Joint
June 6, 2014	Las Vegas	United States	The Joint
June 7, 2014	Las Vegas	United States	The Joint

Festivals and other miscellaneous performances
^{A} This concert was a part of "Tommy Hilfiger's Secret Party"
^{B} This concert was a part of "2013 Malaysian Grand Prix After Party"
^{C} This concert was a part of the "Rocklahoma"
^{D} This concert was a part of the "River City Rock Fest"
^{E} This concert was a part of the "Governors Ball Music Festival"
^{F} This concert was part of the Revolver Golden Gods awards.
^{G} This concert was a part of "Rock on the Range"
^{H} This concert was recorded in 3D, and released on Blu-Ray in 2014.

Cancellations and rescheduled shows

December 15, 2012	Jakarta	Lapangan D Senayan	Rescheduled to December 16, 2012 and moved to Mata Elang International Stadium.
March 18, 2014	Mexico City, Mexico	Hell & Heaven Metal Festival	Festival cancelled.

=== Box office score data ===
Date	Tickets sold / available	Gross revenue
October 31 – November 18, 2012	25,975 / 29,490 (88%)	$2,394,371

== Personnel ==
Guns N' Roses

- Axl Rose – lead vocals, piano, tambourine
- Dizzy Reed – keyboards, piano, conga, shaker, backing vocals
- Tommy Stinson – bass, backing vocals, occasional lead vocals
- DJ Ashba – lead and rhythm guitar, snare drum on "Madagascar"
- Ron "Bumblefoot" Thal – lead and rhythm guitar, acoustic guitar on "Patience", backing vocals, occasional lead vocals.
- Richard Fortus – rhythm and lead guitar, acoustic guitar on "Patience", slide guitar, backing vocals
- Chris Pitman – keyboards, sub-bass, synth organ, samples, tambourine, backing vocals
- Frank Ferrer – drums, percussion

Additional musician

- Duff McKagan – bass, backing vocals, lead vocals on "Attitude" and "Raw Power" (select dates in 2014)
- Izzy Stradlin – rhythm guitar, backing vocals, co-lead vocals on "14 Years" (November 23rd-24th, 2012)
