= Goffertpark =

Park in the Netherlands

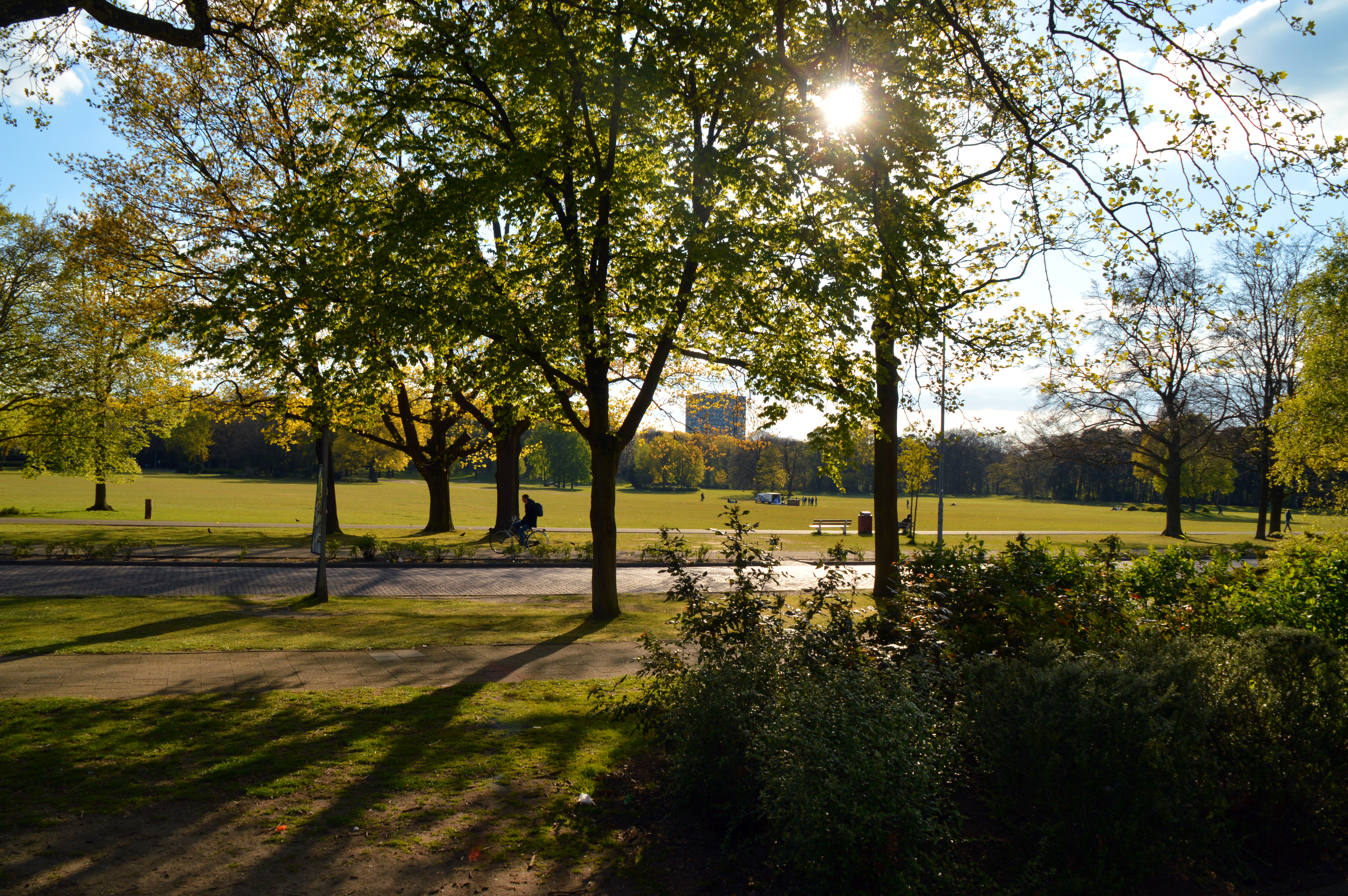
- Goffertpark in Nijmegen, The Netherlands

- Location within Gelderland
- Type: urban park
- Location: Nijmegen
- Coordinates: 51°49′24″N 5°49′57″E
- Area: 83 ha (210 acres)
- Opening: 1939

The Goffertpark, or Stadspark de Goffert, is an urban park in the Dutch city of Nijmegen. It is the site of the Goffertstadion, the stadium that is home to the football club N.E.C. and is sometimes used as an outdoor concert venue. The park is named after a former farm in that location, in turn named after a man who lived there around 1740, nicknamed "den goffert".

In addition to large fields that are used for events such as circus, concerts, and festivals, the park also has a children's farm, rose garden, open-air theater, forest, and several ponds. An outdoor swimming pool, the Goffertbad, is along the edge of the park.

== History ==
In the 1930s, the municipality of Nijmegen began developing 65 hectares (160 acres)} of woodland and heathland into a park with a sports field, a stadium, a teahouse, and a zoo.

The design for the park was created by J.H. Schmidt and D. Monshouwer. Mayor J. A.H. Steinweg insisted on constructing it as part of the unemployment relief program to manage construction costs, and as such, it was one of many Dutch projects implemented as part of job creation efforts during the economic crisis at the time, which had high unemployment. Because it was a job creation project, no machines were allowed—everything had to be done by hand. Work started in the spring of 1935 with one-hundred-sixty unemployed individuals employed to work in the park, earning a fee of 35 cents per hour.

Despite utilizing the land's natural slope, approximately 600,000 cubic metres (21,000,000 cu ft) of sand had to be excavated. Most of the work was done manually with shovels and wheelbarrows, with the most challenging task being digging a 6-metre-deep (20 ft) pit for the stadium, famously known as "the bloedkuul" (the blood pit).

The park was completed just before World War II, in 1939, and was officially opened on July 8 of that year by Prince Bernhard.

== Present status ==
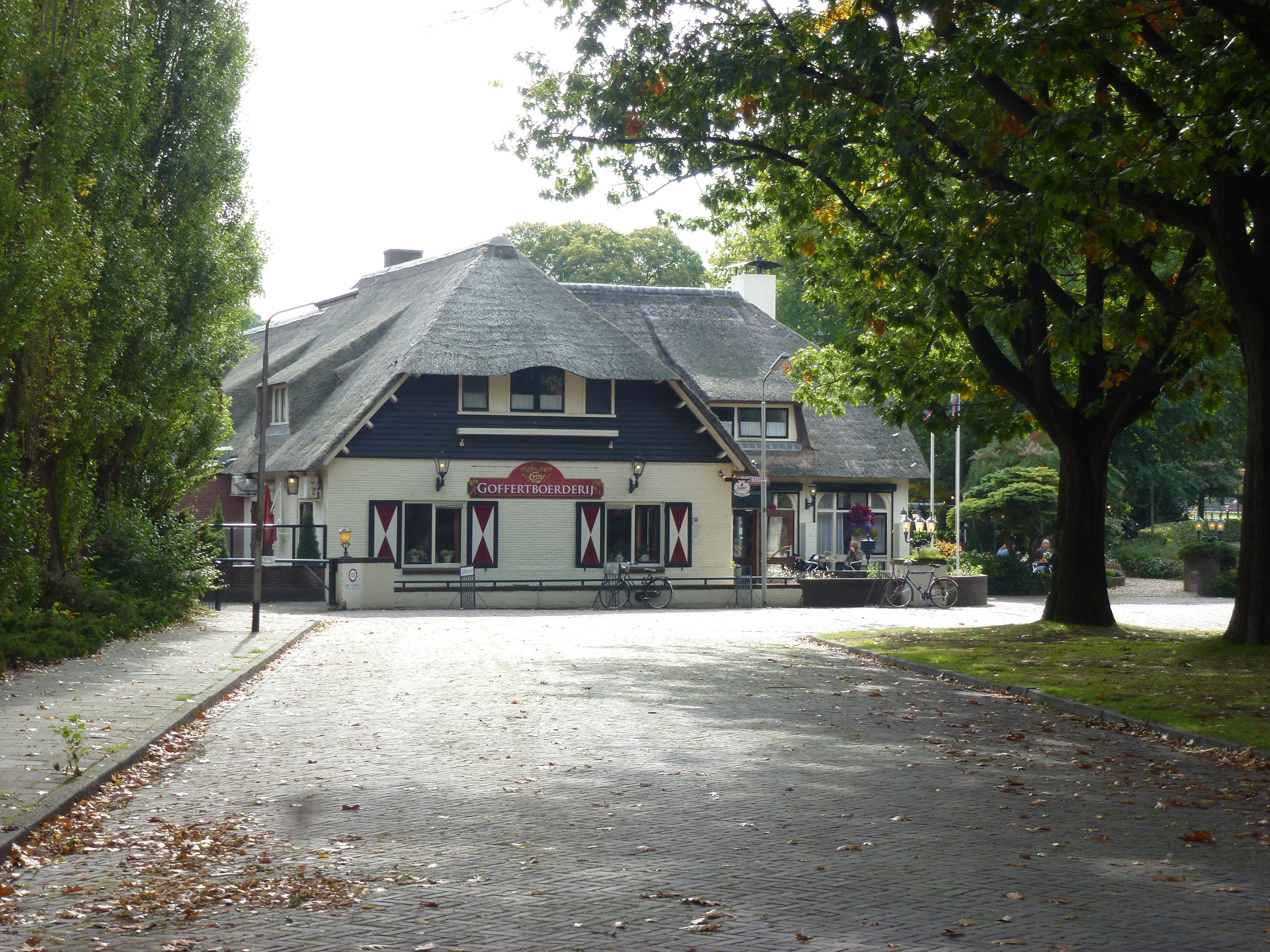
Goffert Farm

The Goffertpark is designated as a municipal monument.

In 1939, N.E.C. relocated to the stadium, which also serves as a venue for athletics and cycling. Sixty years after its opening, in 1999, the park and stadium underwent comprehensive refurbishment and modernization.

Renowned artists, including AC/DC, Aerosmith, Iron Maiden, Black Sabbath, Bon Jovi (twice), Bruce Springsteen and the E Street Band, Coldplay (twice), Deftones, Guns N' Roses (three times), Kings of Leon (twice), KISS, Korn, Limp Bizkit, Linkin Park, Eminem, Metallica, Mudvayne, Mumford and Sons, Phil Collins, Muse (twice), Pearl Jam (twice), Pink Floyd, Rammstein (twice), Robbie Williams, R.E.M., Radiohead, Red Hot Chili Peppers (three times), The Rolling Stones (twice), U2, Van Halen, and Velvet Revolver have performed at the Goffertpark as part of its concert series.

== See also ==
- Goffertstadion
