= List of Guns N' Roses members =

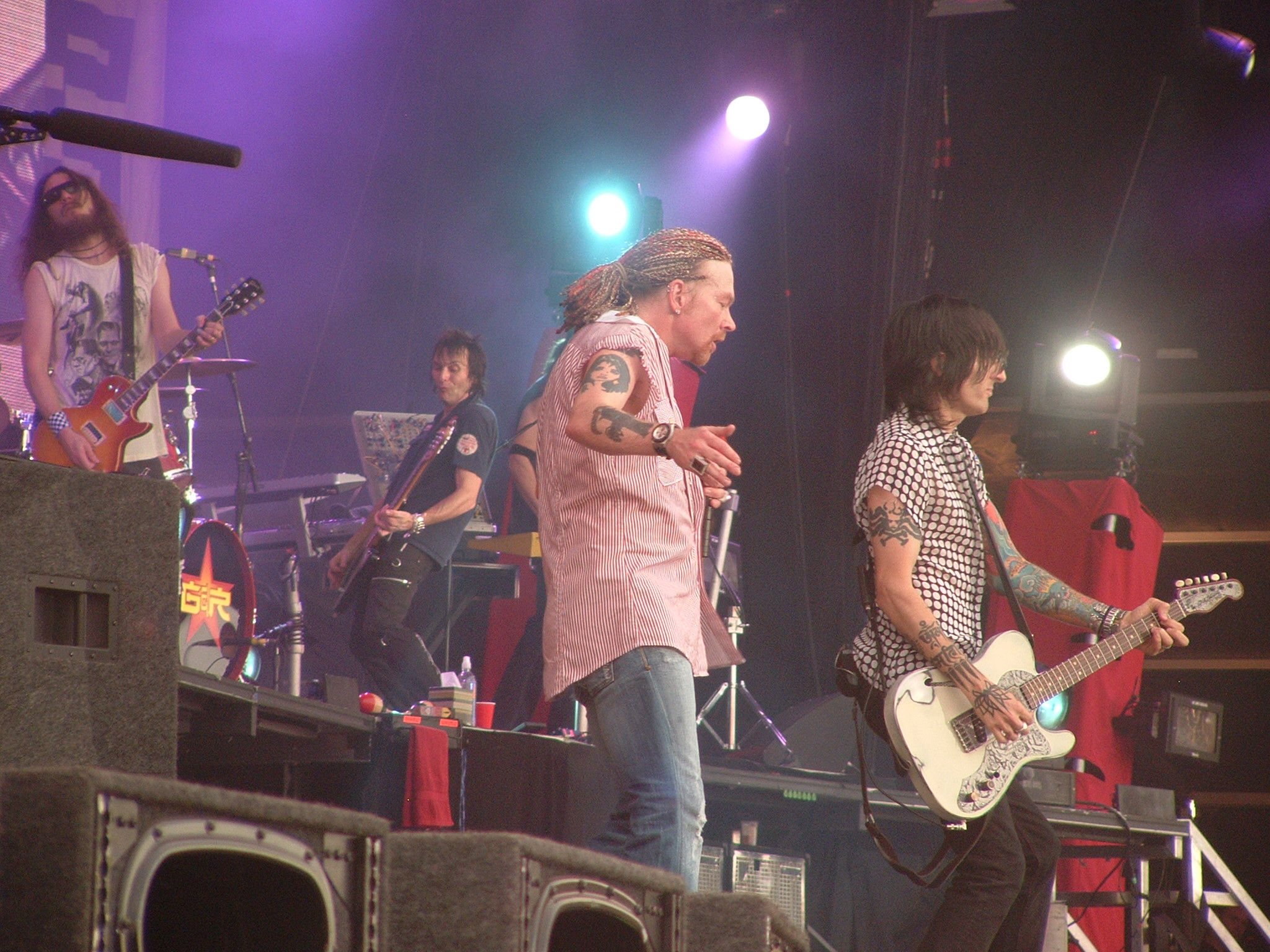
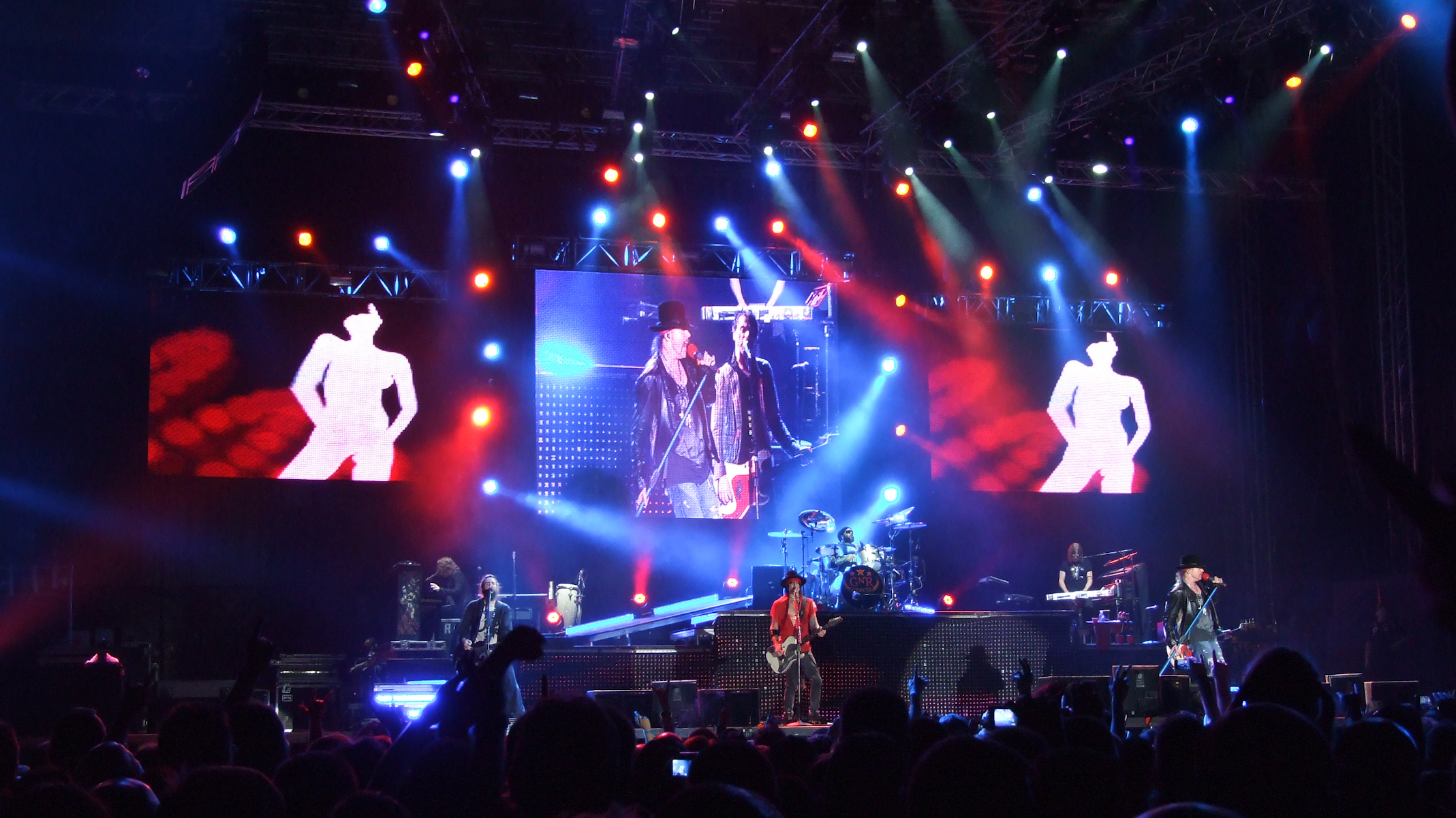
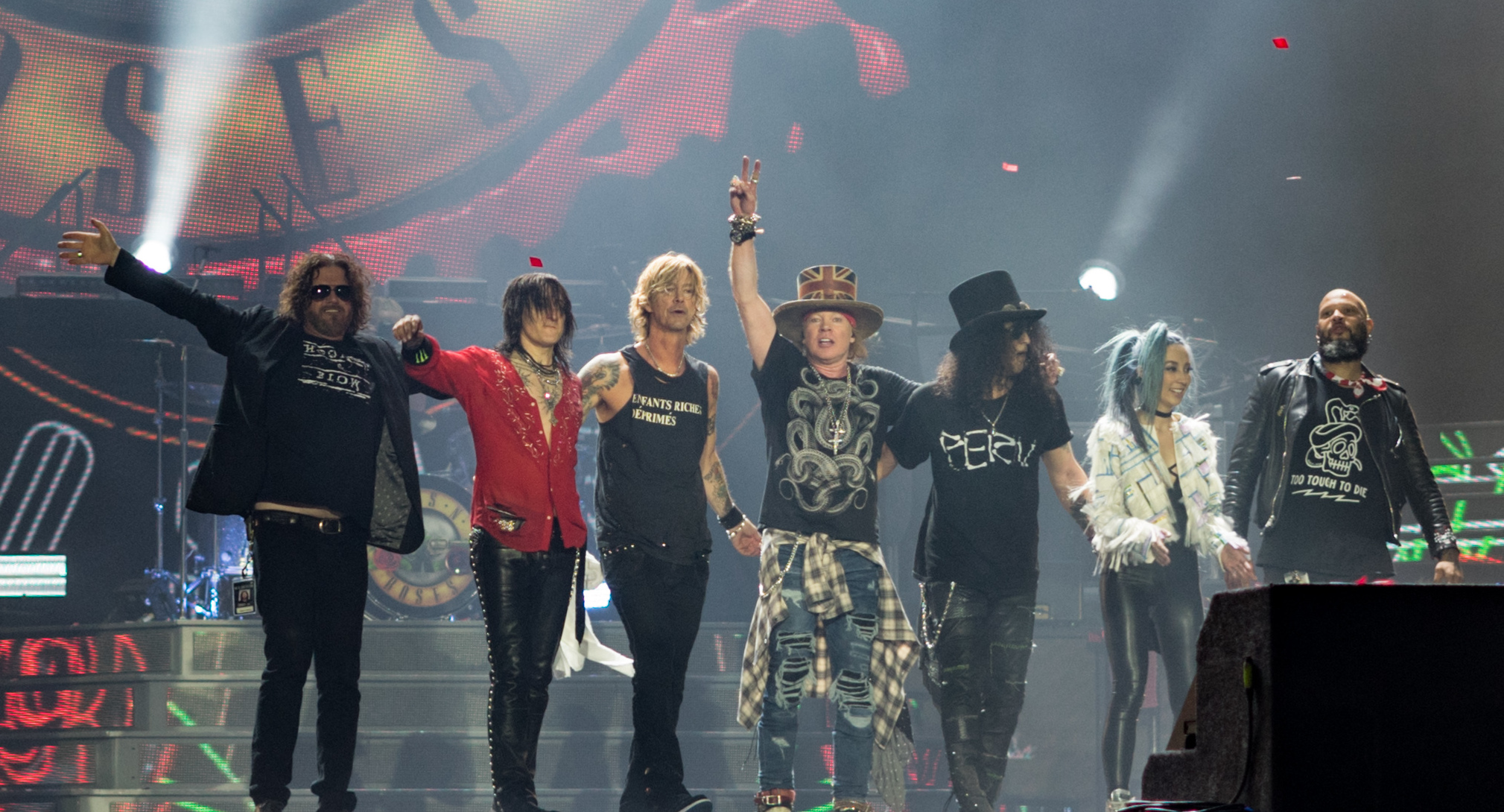
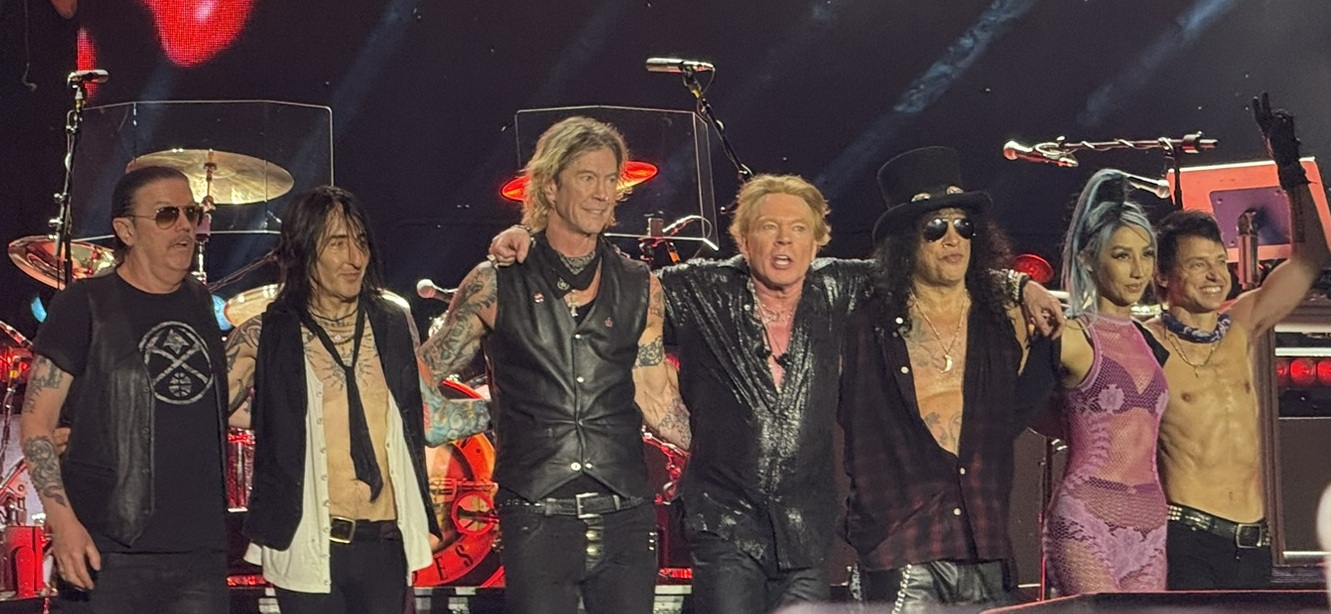
Four lineups of Guns N' Roses in 2006 (top), 2013 (second), 2017 (third), and 2025 (bottom).

Guns N' Roses is an American hard rock band from Los Angeles, California. Formed in 1985, the group originally consisted of vocalist Axl Rose, lead guitarist Tracii Guns, rhythm guitarist Izzy Stradlin, bassist Ole Beich and drummer Rob Gardner. The band has been through many lineup changes and currently includes Rose (a constant member), bassist Duff McKagan (from 1985 to 1997, and since 2016), lead guitarist Slash (from 1985 to 1996, and since 2016), keyboardist Dizzy Reed (since 1990), rhythm guitarist Richard Fortus (since 2002), keyboardist Melissa Reese (since 2016) and drummer Isaac Carpenter (since 2025).

== History ==
=== 1985–1997 ===
Guns N' Roses was formed in March 1985 by vocalist Axl Rose and rhythm guitarist Izzy Stradlin of Hollywood Rose, with lead guitarist Tracii Guns, bassist Ole Beich and drummer Rob Gardner of L.A. Guns. Before the group's first show on March 26, 1985, Beich was fired and replaced by Duff "Rose" McKagan. Shortly thereafter, Guns and Gardner were replaced by Slash and Steven Adler, respectively, both of whom had previously played with McKagan in Road Crew. The group released Appetite for Destruction in 1987, which as of 2017 had reportedly sold more than 30 million copies. During the resulting concert tour, Adler broke his hand in a fight and was replaced for a run of shows by Cinderella drummer Fred Coury. McKagan also missed a show in May 1988 when he got married, with The Cult's Kid "Haggis" Chaos substituting for the bassist.

G N' R Lies was released in 1988, selling almost 10 million copies worldwide as of 2018. Eagles drummer Don Henley performed with the group at the 1989 American Music Awards, after Adler was admitted to rehab for increasing drug problems. By the following July, the drummer had been fired from the band for his continued problems with substance abuse, with The Cult's Matt Sorum taking his place. Adler's last recording with Guns N' Roses was the Use Your Illusion II single "Civil War", which also featured newly-added sixth member Dizzy Reed on piano. The band's new lineup recorded Use Your Illusion I and II and embarked on the Use Your Illusion Tour in May 1991, a few months before their release. On November 7, however, Stradlin abruptly left Guns N' Roses due to the "air of chaos" which surrounded the band. He was replaced by Gilby Clarke, who debuted alongside fellow additions in touring keyboardist Teddy Andreadis, three backing vocalists and a three-piece horn section.

After the conclusion of the two-year long tour, Guns N' Roses released "The Spaghetti Incident?" in 1993, an album of cover versions. Work began the next year on a new studio album; however by October, Clarke had been replaced by Rose's childhood friend Paul "Huge" Tobias in time for the recording of their cover of "Sympathy for the Devil". Clarke was reportedly fired by Rose without the consent of the other band members, and Slash objected to the addition of Tobias, which led him to focus on his new side project Slash's Snakepit. Eventually, various differences led to the guitarist's departure in October 1996. He was soon followed by Sorum, who was fired in April 1997, after an argument with Rose regarding the hiring of Tobias. In August, McKagan became the final member of the Appetite for Destruction lineup to leave, explaining in his autobiography that the band was "so erratic that it didn't seem to fit with my hopes for parenthood, for stability".

=== 1997–2015 ===
Rose retained use of the Guns N' Roses name and began rebuilding the band in 1997. His first addition was former Nine Inch Nails guitarist Robin Finck, who joined to replace Slash in August on a two-year contract. He was followed early the next year by Sorum's replacement Josh Freese, who also signed a contract for two years, and McKagan's replacement Tommy Stinson. Later in the year, Chris Pitman joined on synthesizers & keyboards. The new lineup released "Oh My God" in 1999, which marked the first new Guns N' Roses material in five years. In August, however, Finck left the band to return to Nine Inch Nails upon the expiration of his contract with Rose. He was replaced in March the following year by experimental guitarist Buckethead. Freese left shortly after his arrival, with the guitarist recommending Brain as his replacement. Finck later returned, and Guns N' Roses played its first live show in the US in seven years on December 31, 2000.

After eight years with the group, Paul Tobias left Guns N' Roses in July 2002, with Richard Fortus taking his place. Later in the year, the band embarked on the first leg of its extensive Chinese Democracy Tour, which was their first since 1993. After more touring, Buckethead abruptly left in March 2004, causing the band to cancel its appearance at Rock in Rio. The group continued work on new album Chinese Democracy, but didn't perform again until May 2006 when Buckethead's replacement Ron "Bumblefoot" Thal debuted. In June, Frank Ferrer temporarily replaced Brain for a run of shows, when the regular drummer was forced to return home earlier than expected to be with his pregnant wife. Brain ultimately chose not to return to the band, and Ferrer took over on a permanent basis. Chinese Democracy was released in November 2008, 15 years after the previous studio album, and with an estimated budget of $13 million in production costs.

In March 2009, Finck left Guns N' Roses for a second time to rejoin Nine Inch Nails, with Sixx:A.M.'s DJ Ashba taking his place. The band continued touring in the years following the 2008 release of Chinese Democracy, including the 2012 Up Close and Personal Tour which saw the group downgrading its production for a run of shows in smaller venues. The Appetite for Democracy tour, which began with a 12-night residency in Las Vegas, spawned the group's first live release since 1999, Appetite for Democracy 3D, in 2014. Reports of a follow-up to Chinese Democracy were made by various members of the band during these years, too, including Ashba and Fortus in 2012, and Rose and Reed in 2014. However, in July 2015 it was announced that Ashba had left the group to focus on Sixx:A.M. and his family. Around the same time, after much speculation, it was also confirmed that Thal had left after the conclusion of the 2014 tour. Stinson also left shortly after the tour for personal reasons.

=== 2015 onwards ===
Despite the recent departure of three long-term members, Ferrer confirmed in July 2015 that Guns N' Roses "still exists" and was "moving forward". The following month, former lead guitarist Slash announced that he had become friends with Axl Rose again, after almost 20 years of not talking to his former bandmate. Alongside the recent departures of both lead guitarists, this fuelled renewed rumors of a potential reunion of the 'classic' lineup of Guns N' Roses, which continued as it was reported that the group was being touted for several European festivals in 2016. The rumours ultimately proved to be true to some extent, as it was announced in January 2016 that both Slash and bassist Duff McKagan would be rejoining Guns N' Roses for a headline performance at Coachella Festival. The reunion was later expanded into the Not in This Lifetime... Tour, which commenced in June. Richard Fortus, Frank Ferrer and Dizzy Reed remained present, while Melissa Reese took the place of Chris Pitman. The lineup remained unchanged until Frank Ferrer's last show on November 5, 2023. A day after Guns n' Roses' announced Ferrer's departure on March 19, 2025, they confirmed Isaac Carpenter as his replacement. Reese would not join the band on their 2026 tour "due to unforeseen personal reasons".

== Members ==
=== Current ===
Image	Name	Years active	Instruments	Release contributions
	W. Axl Rose	1985–present	lead vocals; piano; occasional rhythm guitar and percussion	all Guns N' Roses releases
	Michael "Duff" McKagan	1985–1997; 2016–present (Note: Duff McKagan also performed with the band as a live guest at a show on October 14, 2010, and as a touring substitute for Tommy Stinson in 2014.)	bass; backing and occasional lead vocals; acoustic guitar; percussion	all Guns N' Roses releases from Live ?!*@ Like a Suicide (1986) to "Sympathy for the Devil" (1994); Live Era '87–'93 (1999), "Absurd" (2021) and onward
	Slash (Saul Hudson)	1985–1996; 2016–present	lead and rhythm guitars; occasional backing vocals	all Guns N' Roses releases from Live ?!*@ Like a Suicide (1986) to "Sympathy for the Devil" (1994); Live Era '87–'93 (1999), "Absurd" (2021) and onward
	Darren "Dizzy" Reed	1990–present	piano; keyboards; backing vocals; percussion	all Guns N' Roses releases from "Civil War" (1990) onward
	Richard Fortus	2002–present	rhythm and lead guitars; backing vocals	all Guns N' Roses releases from Chinese Democracy (2008) onward
	Melissa Reese	2016–present (Note: Reese did not join the band on their 2026 tour)	keyboards; synthesizers; sub-bass; programming; percussion; backing vocals	"Absurd" (2021), "Hard Skool" (2021)
	Isaac Carpenter	2025–present	drums; percussion	none to date

=== Former ===
Image	Name	Years active	Instruments	Release contributions
	Izzy Stradlin (Jeff Isbell)	1985–1991 (Note: Izzy Stradlin also performed with the band as a touring substitute for Gilby Clarke in 1993, and as a live guest at several shows in 2006 and 2012.)	rhythm and lead guitars; backing and occasional lead vocals; percussion	all Guns N' Roses releases from Live ?!*@ Like a Suicide (1986) to Use Your Illusion II (1991); Live Era '87–'93 (1999)
	Rob Gardner	1985	drums; backing vocals	none (Note: Guns and Gardner (alongside Rose, McKagan and Stradlin) recorded a demo EP with Guns N' Roses in March 1985, but it was not released.)
	Tracii Guns (Tracy Ulrich)	1985	lead and rhythm guitars	none
	Ole Beich	1985 (died 1991)	bass	none
	Steven Adler (Michael Coletti)	1985–1990 (Note: Adler appeared as a live guest during the band's Not in This Lifetime... Tour, on July 6, July 9, and August 19, 2016.)	drums; percussion	all Guns N' Roses releases from Live ?!*@ Like a Suicide (1986) to Civil War (1990); Live Era '87–'93 (1999)
	Matt Sorum	1990–1997	drums; percussion; backing vocals	all Guns N' Roses releases from "Knockin' on Heaven's Door" (Days of Thunder version) (1990) to "Sympathy for the Devil" (1994); Live Era '87–'93 (1999)
	Gilby Clarke	1991–1994	rhythm and lead guitars; backing vocals	Use Your Illusion World Tour 1992 in Tokyo I & II (1992); "The Spaghetti Incident?" (1993); Live Era '87–'93 (1999)
	Paul "Huge" Tobias (Note: Credited as either Paul Huge or Paul Tobias.)	1994–2002	rhythm and lead guitars; backing vocals; occasional piano	"Sympathy for the Devil" (1994); "Oh My God" (1999); Chinese Democracy (2008)
	Robert "Robin" Finck	1997–1999; 2000–2008 (Note: Finck appeared as a live guest on the March 12, 2012, show at the House of Blues in Los Angeles.)	lead and rhythm guitars; occasional keyboards; backing vocals	"Oh My God" (1999); Chinese Democracy (2008); "Atlas" (2025)
	Josh Freese	1997–2000	drums; percussion	"Oh My God" (1999) (Note: Josh Freese's drum recordings were not included on Chinese Democracy, being re-recorded by Brain after Freese left the band, but Freese was credited for arrangements on four tracks.)
	Tommy Stinson	1998–2014	bass; backing and occasional lead vocals	"Oh My God" (1999); Chinese Democracy (2008); Appetite for Democracy 3D (2014)
	Chris Pitman	1998–2016	keyboards; synthesizers; sub-bass; programming; backing vocals; percussion; occasional guitar (Note: Pitman filled in on bass guitar in a 2007 show that Tommy Stinson was unable to attend.)	"Oh My God" (1999); Chinese Democracy (2008); Appetite for Democracy 3D (2014)
	Buckethead (Brian Carroll)	2000–2004	lead and rhythm guitars	Chinese Democracy (2008)
	Brain (Bryan Mantia) (Note: Often miscredited as Brian Mantia.)	2000–2006 (Note: Brain appeared as a live guest on the March 12, 2012, show at the House of Blues in Los Angeles.)	drums; percussion	Chinese Democracy (2008); "Absurd" (2021); "Hard Skool" (2021); "Perhaps" / "The General" (2023); " Nothin'" / "Atlas" (2025)
	Ron "Bumblefoot" Thal (Ronald Blumenthal)	2006–2014	lead and rhythm guitars; backing and occasional lead vocals	Chinese Democracy (2008); Appetite for Democracy 3D (2014)
	Frank Ferrer	2006–2025	drums; percussion	Chinese Democracy (2008); Appetite for Democracy 3D (2014)
	Daren "DJ" Ashba	2009–2015	lead and rhythm guitars	Appetite for Democracy 3D (2014)

=== Touring ===
Image	Name	Years active	Instruments	Details
	Fred Coury	1987–1988	drums	Coury substituted for Steven Adler between late 1987 and early 1988 after the drummer injured his hand during a fight.
	Kid "Haggis" Chaos (Stephen Harris)	1988	bass	Harris replaced Duff McKagan for a show on May 27, 1988, when the bassist took a leave of absence for his wedding.
	Don Henley	1989	drums; backing vocals	Henley replaced Steven Adler for the 1989 American Music Awards after the drummer was admitted to a rehab clinic.
	Teddy Andreadis	1991–1993	keyboards; percussion; harmonica; backing vocals	Additional members of the Use Your Illusion Tour band from December 1991 to February 1993.
	Roberta Freeman	1991–1993	backing vocals; tambourine	Additional members of the Use Your Illusion Tour band from December 1991 to February 1993.
	Tracey Amos	1991–1993	backing vocals; tambourine	Additional members of the Use Your Illusion Tour band from December 1991 to February 1993.
	Diane Jones	1991–1993	backing vocals; tambourine	Additional members of the Use Your Illusion Tour band from December 1991 to February 1993.
	Cece Worrall	1991–1993	saxophones	Additional members of the Use Your Illusion Tour band from December 1991 to February 1993.
	Lisa Maxwell	1991–1993	saxophones	Additional members of the Use Your Illusion Tour band from December 1991 to February 1993.
	Anne King	1991–1993	trumpet	Additional members of the Use Your Illusion Tour band from December 1991 to February 1993.

== Session musicians ==
Image	Name	Years active	Instruments	Release contributions
	Adriana Smith	1987	vocals	Appetite for Destruction (1987) – "Rocket Queen"
	West Arkeen (Aaron Arkeen) (Note: Arkeen co-wrote several songs with the group early on, and Rose considered him "the sixth member of Guns N' Roses".)	1988; 1990–1991; (died 1997)	percussion; acoustic guitar	G N' R Lies (1988) – "Patience", "Used to Love Her", "You're Crazy", "One in a Million"; Use Your Illusion I (1991) – "The Garden"
	Howard Teman	1988; 1990–1991	percussion; piano	G N' R Lies (1988) – "Patience", "Used to Love Her", "You're Crazy", "One in a Million"; Use Your Illusion II (1991) – "So Fine"
	Rick Richards	1988	percussion	G N' R Lies (1988) – "Patience", "Used to Love Her", "You're Crazy", "One in a Million"
	Ray Grden	1988	percussion	G N' R Lies (1988) – "Patience", "Used to Love Her", "You're Crazy", "One in a Million"
	Michael Monroe (Matti Fagerholm)	1990–1991; 1992–1993	harmonica; saxophone; vocals	Use Your Illusion I (1991) – "Bad Obsession"; "The Spaghetti Incident?" (1993) – "Ain't It Fun"
	Stuart Bailey	1990–1991; 1992–1993	backing vocals	Use Your Illusion I (1991) – "November Rain"; "The Spaghetti Incident?" (1993) – "I Don't Care About You"
	Shannon Hoon (Richard Hoon)	1990–1991 (died 1995)	vocals	Use Your Illusion I (1991) – "Live and Let Die", "Don't Cry", "You Ain't the First", "November Rain", "The Garden"; Use Your Illusion II (1991) – "Don't Cry" (alt. lyrics)
	Johann Langlie	1990–1991	keyboards; drums; programming	Use Your Illusion I (1991) – "Live And Let Die", "November Rain", "Garden Of Eden", "Coma"; Use Your Illusion II (1991) – "My World"
	Alice Cooper (Vincent Furnier)	1990–1991	vocals	Use Your Illusion I (1991) – "The Garden"
	Jon Thautwein	1990–1991	horns	Use Your Illusion I (1991) – "Live and Let Die"
	Matthew McKagan	1990–1991	horns	Use Your Illusion I (1991) – "Live and Let Die"
	Rachel West	1990–1991	horns	Use Your Illusion I (1991) – "Live and Let Die"
	Robert Clark	1990–1991	horns	Use Your Illusion I (1991) – "Live and Let Die"
	Tim Doyle	1990–1991	tambourine	Use Your Illusion I (1991) – "You Ain't the First"
	Reba Shaw	1990–1991	backing vocals	Use Your Illusion I (1991) – "November Rain"
	Mike Clink	1990–1991	nutcracker	Use Your Illusion I (1991) – "Dead Horse"
	Bruce Foster	1990–1991	programming	Use Your Illusion I (1991) – "Coma"
	Diane Mitchell	1990–1991	spoken word vocals	Use Your Illusion I (1991) – "Coma"
	Michelle Loiselle	1990–1991	spoken word vocals	Use Your Illusion I (1991) – "Coma"
	Monica Zierhut-Soto	1990–1991	spoken word vocals	Use Your Illusion I (1991) – "Coma"
	Patricia Fuenzalida	1990–1991	spoken word vocals	Use Your Illusion I (1991) – "Coma"
	Rose Mann	1990–1991	spoken word vocals	Use Your Illusion I (1991) – "Coma"
	Susanne Filkins	1990–1991	spoken word vocals	Use Your Illusion I (1991) – "Coma"
	The Waters	1990–1991	backing vocals	Use Your Illusion II (1991) – "Knockin' on Heaven's Door"
	Mike Staggs	1992–1993	guitar	"The Spaghetti Incident?" (1993) – "Ain't It Fun"
	Mike Fasano	1992–1993	percussion	"The Spaghetti Incident?" (1993) – "Hair of the Dog"
	Richard Duguay	1992–1993	guitars	"The Spaghetti Incident?" (1993) – "You Can't Put Your Arms Around a Memory"
	Eddie Huletz	1992–1993	backing vocals	"The Spaghetti Incident?" (1993) – "You Can't Put Your Arms Around a Memory"
	Blake Stanton	1992–1993	backing vocals	"The Spaghetti Incident?" (1993) – "I Don't Care About You"
	Eric Mills	1992–1993	backing vocals	"The Spaghetti Incident?" (1993) – "I Don't Care About You"
	Riki Rachtman (David Rachtman)	1992–1993	backing vocals	"The Spaghetti Incident?" (1993) – "I Don't Care About You"
	Carlos Booy	1992–1993	acoustic guitar	"The Spaghetti Incident?" (1993) – "Look at Your Game, Girl"
	Sid Riggs (Sean Riggs) (Note: Riggs worked as a studio drummer sporadically for Guns N' Roses while working on the follow-up to "The Spaghetti Incident?". Riggs contributed to the songwriting of "Oh My God", although did not perform on the track.)	1994–1999	drums	"Oh My God" (1999)
	Zakk Wylde (Jeffrey Wielandt) (Note: Wylde performed with the band in studio for several weeks auditioning for a guitar spot, but he ultimately was not brought in.)	1995	guitar	none
	Krys Baratto (Note: Baratto performed with the band in the studio while McKagan was away working on Neurotic Outsiders.)	1996–1997	bass	none
	Chris Vrenna (Note: Vrenna performed with the band for several months as drummer in 1997 during the sessions for what would become Chinese Democracy; however, none of his contributions or writing are featured on the album.)	1997	drums and programming	none
	Dave Abbruzzese (Note: Abbruzzese auditioned for the band after Vrenna left during the sessions for what would become Chinese Democracy; however, none of his contributions or writing are featured on the album.)	1997	drums	none
	Joey Castillo (Note: Castillo auditioned for the band during the sessions for what would become Chinese Democracy; however, none of his contributions or writing are featured on the album.)	1997	drums	none
	Michael Bland (Note: Bland auditioned for the band during the sessions for what would become Chinese Democracy; however, none of his contributions or writing are featured on the album.)	1997	drums	none
	Brian May (Note: May recorded lead guitar for several songs during the Chinese Democracy sessions, including "Catcher in the Rye" in 1999, but his contributions were removed from the final album.)	1999	guitar	none
	Dave Navarro	1999	guitar	"Oh My God" (1999)
	Gary Sunshine	1999	guitar	"Oh My God" (1999)
	Stuart White	1999	programming	"Oh My God" (1999)
	Eric Caudieux	2002–2007	drum machine; sub drums; engineering	all Guns N' Roses releases from Chinese Democracy (2008) onward
	Pete Scaturro	2002–2007	keyboards	Chinese Democracy (2008)
	Marco Beltrami	2003	orchestra	Chinese Democracy (2008) – "Street of Dreams", "There Was a Time", "Madagascar", "This I Love", "Prostitute"; "The General" (2023)
	Paul Buckmaster	2004 (died 2017)	orchestra	Chinese Democracy (2008) – "Street of Dreams", "There Was a Time", "Madagascar", "Prostitute"
	Suzy Katayama	2004–2007	French horn	Chinese Democracy (2008) – "Madagascar"
	Patti Hood	2004–2007	harp	Chinese Democracy (2008) – "This I Love"
	Caram Costanzo	2000–2023	sub drums; keyboards; production; engineering; mixing; live mixing	all Guns N' Roses releases from Chinese Democracy (2008) onward
	Sebastian Bach (Sebastian Bierk)	2007	vocals	Chinese Democracy (2008) – "Sorry"
	Marc Haggard	2002	guitar	"The General" (2023)

== Lineups ==
Period	Members	Releases
March 1985	Axl Rose – lead vocals; Tracii Guns – lead and rhythm guitar, backing vocals; Izzy Stradlin – rhythm and lead guitar, backing vocals; Ole Beich – bass, backing vocals; Rob Gardner – drums, backing vocals	none
March – May 1985	Axl Rose – lead vocals; Tracii Guns – lead and rhythm guitar, backing vocals; Izzy Stradlin – rhythm and lead guitar, backing vocals; Duff McKagan – bass, backing vocals; Rob Gardner – drums, backing vocals	none
May 1985 – February 1990	Axl Rose – lead vocals, keyboards, piano; Slash – lead and rhythm guitar; Izzy Stradlin – rhythm and lead guitar, backing vocals; Duff McKagan – bass, backing vocals; Steven Adler – drums, percussion	Live ?!*@ Like a Suicide (1986); Appetite for Destruction (1987); Guns N' Roses (1988); G N' R Lies (1988); Live Era '87–'93 (1999) – three tracks
February – July 1990	Axl Rose – lead vocals, keyboards, piano; Slash – lead and rhythm guitar, backing vocals; Izzy Stradlin – rhythm and lead guitar, backing vocals; Dizzy Reed – keyboards, piano, backing vocals; Duff McKagan – bass, backing vocals; Steven Adler – drums, percussion	Use Your Illusion II (1991) – "Civil War" only
July 1990 – November 1991	Axl Rose – lead vocals, keyboards, piano; Slash – lead and rhythm guitar; Izzy Stradlin – rhythm and lead guitar, backing vocals; Dizzy Reed – keyboards, piano, percussion, backing vocals; Duff McKagan – bass, backing vocals; Matt Sorum – drums, percussion, backing vocals	Use Your Illusion I (1991); Use Your Illusion II (1991); Live Era '87–'93 (1999) – three tracks
November 1991 – October 1994	Axl Rose – lead vocals, keyboards, piano; Slash – lead, rhythm and slide guitar; Gilby Clarke – rhythm and lead guitar, backing vocals; Dizzy Reed – keyboards, piano, percussion, backing vocals; Duff McKagan – bass, backing vocals; Matt Sorum – drums, percussion, backing vocals	"The Spaghetti Incident?" (1993); Live Era '87–'93 (1999)
October 1994 – October 1996	Axl Rose – lead vocals, keyboards, piano; Slash – lead and rhythm guitar; Paul Tobias – rhythm and lead guitar, backing vocals; Dizzy Reed – keyboards, piano, percussion, backing vocals; Duff McKagan – bass, backing vocals; Matt Sorum – drums, percussion, backing vocals	"Sympathy for the Devil" (1994)
October 1996 – April 1997	Axl Rose – lead vocals, keyboards, piano; Paul Tobias – guitars, backing vocals; Dizzy Reed – keyboards, piano, percussion, backing vocals; Duff McKagan – bass, backing vocals; Matt Sorum – drums, percussion, backing vocals	none
April – August 1997	Axl Rose – lead vocals, keyboards, piano; Paul Tobias – guitars, backing vocals; Dizzy Reed – keyboards, piano, percussion, backing vocals; Duff McKagan – bass, backing vocals	none
August 1997	Axl Rose – lead vocals, keyboards, piano; Robin Finck – lead and rhythm guitar, keyboards, backing vocals; Paul Tobias – rhythm and lead guitar, backing vocals; Dizzy Reed – keyboards, piano, percussion, backing vocals; Duff McKagan – bass, backing vocals	none
August 1997 – March 1998	Axl Rose – lead vocals, keyboards, piano; Robin Finck – lead and rhythm guitar, keyboards, backing vocals; Paul Tobias – rhythm and lead guitar, backing vocals; Dizzy Reed – keyboards, piano, percussion, backing vocals	Chinese Democracy (2008)
March – May 1998	Axl Rose – lead vocals, keyboards, piano; Robin Finck – lead and rhythm guitar, keyboards, backing vocals; Paul Tobias – rhythm and lead guitar, backing vocals; Dizzy Reed – keyboards, piano, percussion, backing vocals; Josh Freese – drums, percussion	Chinese Democracy (2008)
May – October 1998	Axl Rose – lead vocals, keyboards, piano; Robin Finck – lead and rhythm guitar, keyboards, backing vocals; Paul Tobias – rhythm and lead guitar, backing vocals; Dizzy Reed – keyboards, piano, percussion, backing vocals; Tommy Stinson – bass, backing vocals; Josh Freese – drums, percussion	Chinese Democracy (2008)
October 1998 – August 1999	Axl Rose – lead vocals, keyboards, piano; Robin Finck – lead and rhythm guitar, keyboards, backing vocals; Paul Tobias – rhythm and lead guitar, backing vocals; Dizzy Reed – keyboards, piano, percussion, backing vocals; Chris Pitman – keyboards, percussion, backing vocals; Tommy Stinson – bass, backing vocals; Josh Freese – drums, percussion	"Oh My God" (1999); Chinese Democracy (2008)
August 1999 – March 2000	Axl Rose – lead vocals, keyboards, piano; Paul Tobias – guitars, backing vocals; Dizzy Reed – keyboards, piano, percussion, backing vocals; Chris Pitman – keyboards, percussion, backing vocals; Tommy Stinson – bass, backing vocals; Josh Freese – drums, percussion	Chinese Democracy (2008)
March – October 2000	Axl Rose – lead vocals, keyboards, piano; Buckethead – lead and rhythm guitar; Paul Tobias – rhythm and lead guitar, backing vocals; Dizzy Reed – keyboards, piano, percussion, backing vocals; Chris Pitman – keyboards, percussion, backing vocals; Tommy Stinson – bass, backing vocals; Brain – drums, percussion	Chinese Democracy (2008)
October 2000 – July 2002	Axl Rose – lead vocals, keyboards, piano; Buckethead – lead and rhythm guitar; Robin Finck – lead and rhythm guitar, keyboards, backing vocals; Paul Tobias – rhythm and lead guitar, backing vocals; Dizzy Reed – keyboards, piano, percussion, backing vocals; Chris Pitman – keyboards, percussion, backing vocals; Tommy Stinson – bass, backing vocals; Brain – drums, percussion	Chinese Democracy (2008)
July 2002 – March 2004	Axl Rose – lead vocals, keyboards, piano; Buckethead – lead and rhythm guitar; Robin Finck – lead and rhythm guitar, keyboards, backing vocals; Richard Fortus – rhythm and lead guitar, backing vocals; Dizzy Reed – keyboards, piano, percussion, backing vocals; Chris Pitman – keyboards, percussion, backing vocals; Tommy Stinson – bass, backing vocals; Brain – drums, percussion	Chinese Democracy (2008)
March 2004 – May 2006	Axl Rose – lead vocals, keyboards, piano; Robin Finck – lead and rhythm guitar, keyboards, backing vocals; Richard Fortus – rhythm and lead guitar, backing vocals; Dizzy Reed – keyboards, piano, percussion, backing vocals; Chris Pitman – keyboards, percussion, backing vocals; Tommy Stinson – bass, backing vocals; Brain – drums, percussion	Chinese Democracy (2008)
May – October 2006	Axl Rose – lead vocals, keyboards, piano; Robin Finck – lead and rhythm guitar, keyboards, backing vocals; Ron "Bumblefoot" Thal – lead and rhythm guitar, backing vocals; Richard Fortus – rhythm and lead guitar, backing vocals; Dizzy Reed – keyboards, piano, percussion, backing vocals; Chris Pitman – keyboards, percussion, backing vocals; Tommy Stinson – bass, backing vocals; Brain – drums, percussion	Chinese Democracy (2008)
October 2006 – March 2009	Axl Rose – lead vocals, keyboards, piano; Robin Finck – lead and rhythm guitar, keyboards, backing vocals; Bumblefoot – lead and rhythm guitar, backing vocals; Richard Fortus – rhythm and lead guitar, backing vocals; Dizzy Reed – keyboards, piano, percussion, backing vocals; Chris Pitman – keyboards, percussion, backing vocals; Tommy Stinson – bass, backing vocals; Frank Ferrer – drums, percussion	Chinese Democracy (2008)
March 2009 – June 2014	Axl Rose – lead vocals, keyboards, piano; Bumblefoot – lead and rhythm guitar, backing vocals; DJ Ashba – lead and rhythm guitar; Richard Fortus – rhythm and lead guitar, backing vocals; Dizzy Reed – keyboards, piano, percussion, backing vocals; Chris Pitman – keyboards, percussion, backing vocals; Tommy Stinson – bass, backing vocals; Frank Ferrer – drums, percussion	Appetite for Democracy 3D (2014)
June 2014 – July 2015	Axl Rose – lead vocals, keyboards, piano; DJ Ashba – lead and rhythm guitar; Richard Fortus – rhythm and lead guitar, backing vocals; Dizzy Reed – keyboards, piano, percussion, backing vocals; Chris Pitman – keyboards, percussion, backing vocals; Frank Ferrer – drums, percussion	none
July – December 2015	Axl Rose – lead vocals, keyboards, piano; Richard Fortus – guitars, backing vocals; Dizzy Reed – keyboards, piano, percussion, backing vocals; Chris Pitman – keyboards, percussion, backing vocals; Frank Ferrer – drums, percussion	none
January – February 2016	Axl Rose – lead vocals, keyboards, piano; Slash – lead and rhythm guitar; Richard Fortus – rhythm and lead guitar, backing vocals; Dizzy Reed – keyboards, piano, percussion, backing vocals; Chris Pitman – keyboards, percussion, backing vocals; Duff McKagan – bass, backing vocals; Frank Ferrer – drums, percussion	none
March 2016 – February 2025	Axl Rose – lead vocals, keyboards, piano; Slash – lead and rhythm guitar; Richard Fortus – rhythm and lead guitar, backing vocals; Dizzy Reed – keyboards, piano, percussion, backing vocals; Melissa Reese – keyboards, percussion, backing vocals; Duff McKagan – bass, backing vocals; Frank Ferrer – drums, percussion	"ABSUЯD" (single) (2021) (Note: These recordings developed from tracks originated during the Chinese Democracy sessions and include musicians who were no longer members of Guns N' Roses at time of release. Former drummer Brain performs drums on each track instead of Ferrer, and former keyboardist Chris Pitman performs on "The General".); "Hard Skool" (single) (2021); "Hard Skool" (EP) (2022); "Perhaps" (single) (2023); "The General" (single) (2023)
March 2025 – present	Axl Rose – lead vocals, keyboards, piano; Slash – lead and rhythm guitar; Richard Fortus – rhythm and lead guitar, backing vocals; Dizzy Reed – keyboards, piano, percussion, backing vocals; Melissa Reese – keyboards, percussion, backing vocals; Duff McKagan – bass, backing vocals; Isaac Carpenter – drums, percussion	"Nothin'" (single) (2025) (Note: These recordings developed from tracks originated during the Chinese Democracy sessions and include musicians who were no longer members of Guns N' Roses at time of release. Former drummer Brain performs drums on each track instead of Carpenter, and former guitarist Robin Finck contributed guitar to "Atlas".); "Atlas" (single) (2025)
