= We're F'N' Back! Tour =

2021–23 concert tour by Guns N' Roses

- Tour by Guns N' Roses
- Tour poster for European stops
- Location: Asia; Europe; North America; Oceania; South America
- Start date: July 31, 2021
- End date: December 10, 2022
- Legs: 5
- No. of shows: 72
- Box office: $140.7 million (50 shows)

Guns N' Roses concert chronology
- Not in This Lifetime... Tour (2016–2019); We're F'N' Back! Tour (2021–2022); 2023 Tour (2023)

The We're F'N' Back! Tour was a concert tour by the American hard rock band Guns N' Roses spanning from July 31, 2021 to December 10, 2022.

== Background ==
After a one-off show on January 31, 2020, in Miami in conjunction with Super Bowl LIV, the band was slated to tour Central and South America in March and April.

On February 6, 2020, a tour with The Smashing Pumpkins as openers was planned for several dates in July 2020. The first tour date took place as scheduled on March 14, 2020, in Mexico City as part of the Vive Latino Festival (where they played "So Fine" with Duff McKagan on vocals for the first time since 1993), in spite of the rapid advance of the COVID-19 pandemic. Although it was announced two days later on March 16, 2020, that the remaining Latin American dates had been postponed until October through December 2020, the shows would later be postponed indefinitely. On May 11, 2020, the band announced on Twitter that the European leg of the tour, which was originally scheduled to begin on May 20 in Lisbon, Portugal, had been cancelled.

On May 20, 2020, the band announced that the North American leg of the tour was "being rescheduled out of an abundance of caution". The postponed leg was originally slated to begin on July 4 in Milwaukee and end on August 26 in Missoula, Montana.

The now-cancelled August 8 appearance at SoFi Stadium in the Los Angeles area would have been (in addition to being the band's return to their home town) the first rock and roll show at the new stadium.

On November 19, 2020, the band announced 8 new Oceania dates. The Oceania tour is scheduled to begin on November 6, 2021, in Gold Coast, Australia, before wrapping things up on November 24, 2021, in Perth, Australia. The Toronto date for July 26 was cancelled on June 1, 2021.

On August 3, 2021, at Fenway Park in Boston, the band played "Absurd", a reworking of the song "Silkworms" from the Chinese Democracy sessions, performed live four times back in 2001.

After the band's show at Wrigley Field on September 16, 2021, Rose released a statement saying he was suffering from food poisoning during the show, however he performed the show in full.

On September 24, 2021, the band released "Hard Skool", another reworking of a song from the Chinese Democracy sessions, and played live on September 26, 2021, in Royal Farms Arena in Baltimore. The song had been rumored to be released and had been played at soundchecks in 2019, 2020 (at the band's last show before the pandemic, with Rose present) and 2021.

According to figures reported to Billboard Boxscore, the U.S. leg of the Guns N' Roses 2021 Tour grossed $50 million and sold 363,000 tickets.

On September 9, 2022, Axl Rose apologized on his Twitter account for the concert held at Rock in Rio in Rio de Janeiro. On his account, he wrote that: "I want to apologize for being a bit under the weather, thankful not Covid. I tried to keep my cough between lines. Love you. Thank you to the fans and Rock in Rio for everything and what a fucking great crowd."

== Tour dates ==
List of concerts
Date	City	Country	Venue	Opening act	Attendance	Revenue
July 31, 2021	Hershey	United States	Hersheypark Stadium	Mammoth WVH	23,908 / 25,000	$2,289,600
August 3, 2021	Boston	United States	Fenway Park	Mammoth WVH	25,549 / 30,000	$3,742,808
August 5, 2021	East Rutherford	United States	MetLife Stadium	Mammoth WVH	35,611 / 38,000	$4,532,815
August 8, 2021	Detroit	United States	Comerica Park	Mammoth WVH	19,105 / 21,000	$1,824,930
August 11, 2021	Fargo	United States	Fargodome	Mammoth WVH	9,100 / 10,087	$988,411
August 13, 2021	Missoula	United States	Washington–Grizzly Stadium	Mammoth WVH	15,500 / 18,000	$1,602,149
August 16, 2021	Commerce City	United States	Dick's Sporting Goods Park	Mammoth WVH	15,488 / 16,414	$1,824,855
August 19, 2021	Los Angeles	United States	Banc of California Stadium	Mammoth WVH	21,950 / 21,950	$3,487,948
August 22, 2021	Portland	United States	Moda Center	Mammoth WVH	10,553 / 10,553	$1,414,302
August 25, 2021	San Jose	United States	SAP Center	Mammoth WVH	10,438 / 10,438	$1,393,972
August 27, 2021	Las Vegas	United States	Allegiant Stadium	Mammoth WVH	36,096 / 37,000	$4,140,215
August 30, 2021	Phoenix	United States	Footprint Center	Mammoth WVH	12,709 / 12,971	$1,669,206
September 1, 2021	Dallas	United States	American Airlines Center	Mammoth WVH	11,880 / 11,880	$1,746,349
September 4, 2021 (Note: The performance in Napa on September 14, 2021 was part of BottleRock Napa Valley.)	Napa	United States	Napa Valley Expo	—N/a	—N/a	—N/a
September 8, 2021	Indianapolis	United States	Lucas Oil Stadium	Mammoth WVH	19,223 / 22,702	$2,370,635
September 11, 2021	Atlantic City	United States	Hard Rock Live	Mammoth WVH	9,432 / 9,432	$2,426,763
September 12, 2021	Atlantic City	United States	Hard Rock Live	Mammoth WVH	9,432 / 9,432	$2,426,763
September 16, 2021	Chicago	United States	Wrigley Field	Mammoth WVH	23,464 / 28,959	$2,734,917
September 18, 2021 (Note: The performance in Milwaukee on September 18, 2021 was part of Summerfest.)	Milwaukee	United States	American Family Insurance Amphitheater	—N/a	—N/a	—N/a
September 21, 2021	St. Paul	United States	Xcel Energy Center	Mammoth WVH	10,548 / 10,548	$1,409,647
September 23, 2021	Columbus	United States	Schottenstein Center	Mammoth WVH	9,315 / 10,540	$1,459,582
September 26, 2021	Baltimore	United States	Royal Farms Arena	Mammoth WVH	8,705 / 9,321	$1,315,527
September 29, 2021	Raleigh	United States	PNC Arena	Mammoth WVH	10,888 / 10,888	$1,704,619
October 2, 2021	Hollywood	United States	Hard Rock Live	Mammoth WVH	11,877 / 11,877	$3,262,308
October 3, 2021	Hollywood	United States	Hard Rock Live	Mammoth WVH	11,877 / 11,877	$3,262,308
June 4, 2022	Lisbon	Portugal	Passeio Marítimo de Algés	Gary Clark Jr.	42,500 / 58,628	$3,112,803
June 7, 2022	Seville	Spain	Estadio Benito Villamarín	Gary Clark Jr.	44,429 / 47,701	$3,887,964
June 11, 2022 (Note: The performance in Sölvesborg on June 11, 2022 was part of the Sweden Rock Festival.)	Sölvesborg	Sweden	Norje Havsbad	—N/a	—N/a	—N/a
June 15, 2022	Stavanger	Norway	Forus Travbane	Turbonegro; Gary Clark Jr.	39,010 / 44,481	$4,000,076
June 18, 2022	Prague	Czechia	Letňany	Gary Clark Jr.	35,000 / 48,382	$2,504,505
June 20, 2022	Warsaw	Poland	PGE Narodowy	Gary Clark Jr.	49,026 / 49,026	$3,206,462
June 23, 2022	Groningen	Netherlands	Stadspark	Gary Clark Jr.	52,140 / 52,140	$4,932,297
June 25, 2022 (Note: The performance in Clisson on June 25, 2022 was part of the Hellfest festival.)	Clisson	France	Val de Moine	—N/a	—N/a	—N/a
June 28, 2022	Dublin	Ireland	Marlay Park	Gary Clark Jr.	36,471 / 36,805	$4,100,999
July 1, 2022	London	England	Tottenham Hotspur Stadium	Gary Clark Jr.	92,762 / 95,213	$11,265,674
July 2, 2022	London	England	Tottenham Hotspur Stadium	Gary Clark Jr.	92,762 / 95,213	$11,265,674
July 8, 2022	Munich	Germany	Olympiastadion	Gary Clark Jr.	61,920 / 62,444	$6,449,824
July 10, 2022	Milan	Italy	San Siro	Gary Clark Jr.	53,623 / 55,758	$4,211,062
July 13, 2022	Vienna	Austria	Praterstadion	Gary Clark Jr.	40,000 / 54,002	$3,991,505
July 15, 2022	Hanover	Germany	Niedersachsenstadion	Gary Clark Jr.	40,000 / 43,980	$3,465,934
September 1, 2022	Manaus	Brazil	Arena da Amazônia	—N/a	27,543 / 30,000	$2,533,876
September 4, 2022	Recife	Brazil	Arena Pernambuco	—N/a	24,271 / 30,001	$1,656,606
September 8, 2022 (Note: The performance in Rio de Janeiro on September 8, 2022 was part of Rock in Rio.)	Rio de Janeiro	Brazil	Barra Olympic Park	—N/a	—N/a	—N/a
September 11, 2022	Goiânia	Brazil	Estádio Serra Dourada	—N/a	39,712 / 40,000	$3,000,937
September 13, 2022	Belo Horizonte	Brazil	Mineirão	—N/a	29,017 / 34,001	$1,832,408
September 16, 2022	Ribeirão Preto	Brazil	Arena Eurobike	—N/a	27,539 / 29,998	$2,506,981
September 18, 2022	Florianópolis	Brazil	Hard Rock Live	—N/a	28,916 / 29,998	$2,358,630
September 21, 2022	Curitiba	Brazil	Pedreira Paulo Leminski	—N/a	19,450 / 32,000	$1,837,577
September 24, 2022	São Paulo	Brazil	Allianz Parque	—N/a	45,032 / 45,032	$4,278,001
September 26, 2022	Porto Alegre	Brazil	Arena do Grêmio	Tokyo Drive	36,686 / 39,997	$2,539,969
September 30, 2022	Buenos Aires	Argentina	Estadio River Plate	Airbag	58,312 / 59,997	$4,764,644
October 2, 2022	Montevideo	Uruguay	Estadio Centenario	4 Cuervos	25,352 / 26,998	$2,446,052
October 5, 2022	Santiago	Chile	Estadio Nacional; Julio Martínez Prádanos	Molotov; Frank's White Canvas	57,352 / 57,352	$4,363,049
October 8, 2022	Lima	Peru	Estadio Universidad San Marcos	Molotov	33,371 / 34,998	$2,655,209
October 11, 2022	Bogotá	Colombia	Estadio El Campín	Aterciopelados	85,264 / 90,255	$6,837,113
October 12, 2022	Bogotá	Colombia	Estadio El Campín	Aterciopelados	85,264 / 90,255	$6,837,113
October 15, 2022	Mérida	Mexico	Hacienda Xmatkuil	Molotov	—	—
October 18, 2022	Zapopan	Mexico	Estadio Akron	Molotov	—	—
October 21, 2022	Mexico City	Mexico	Estadio Ciudad de los Deportes	—N/a	—	—
October 23, 2022	Monterrey	Mexico	Estadio de Béisbol Monterrey	The Warning	—	—
November 5, 2022	Saitama	Japan	Saitama Super Arena	Loudness	—	—
November 6, 2022	Saitama	Japan	Saitama Super Arena	Granrodeo; Band-Maid	—	—
November 9, 2022	Bangkok	Thailand	Thunderdome Stadium	—N/a	—	—
November 12, 2022	Singapore		National Stadium	—N/a	—	—
November 18, 2022	Perth	Australia	Optus Stadium	The Chats; Cosmic Psychos	—	—
November 22, 2022	Brisbane	Australia	Suncorp Stadium	The Chats; Cosmic Psychos	—	—
November 24, 2022	Gold Coast	Australia	Metricon Stadium	The Chats; Cosmic Psychos	—	—
November 27, 2022	Sydney	Australia	Accor Stadium	The Chats; Cosmic Psychos	51,087 / 51,087	—
November 29, 2022	Adelaide	Australia	Adelaide Oval	The Chats; Cosmic Psychos	—	—
December 3, 2022	Melbourne	Australia	Melbourne Cricket Ground	The Chats; Cosmic Psychos	52,745 / 52,745	—
December 8, 2022	Wellington	New Zealand	Sky Stadium	The Chats; Alien Weaponry	—	—
December 10, 2022	Auckland	New Zealand	Eden Park	The Chats; Alien Weaponry	—	—
Total					—	—

=== Cancelled dates ===
List of concerts, showing date, city, country, venue, and reason for cancellation
Date	City	Country	Venue	Reason
May 21, 2022 (Note: The concert on May 21, 2022 was supposed to be a part of Welcome to Rockville.)	Daytona Beach	United States	Daytona International Speedway	Weather concerns
July 5, 2022	Glasgow	Scotland	Glasgow Green	Illness

== Personnel ==
=== Guns N' Roses ===
- Axl Rose – lead vocals, piano, percussion
- Slash – lead guitar, talkbox, slide guitar
- Duff McKagan – bass, backing vocals, lead vocals
- Dizzy Reed – keyboards, piano, percussion, backing vocals
- Richard Fortus – rhythm guitar, lead guitar, backing vocals
- Frank Ferrer – drums, percussion
- Melissa Reese – keyboards, synthesizers, sub-bass, programming, percussion, backing vocals

=== Guests ===
- P!nk – vocals during the song "Patience" (September 4, 2021)
- Dave Grohl – vocals and guitar during the song "Paradise City" (September 4, 2021)
- Wolfgang Van Halen – guitar and vocals during the song "Paradise City" (October 2, 2021 & October 3, 2021)
- Carrie Underwood - vocals during the songs "Sweet Child o' Mine" and "Paradise City" (July 1, 2022; July 2, 2022)
