= Guns N' Roses 2023 Tour =

2021–23 concert tour by Guns N' Roses

- Tour by Guns N' Roses
- Poster to the concert in Dessel, Belgium
- Location: Asia; Europe; North America
- Start date: June 1, 2023
- End date: November 5, 2023
- Legs: 2
- No. of shows: 50 (51 scheduled)
- Box office: $96.2 million (31 shows)

Guns N' Roses concert chronology
- We're F'N' Back! Tour (2021–2022); Guns N' Roses 2023 Tour (2023); Because What You Want & What You Get Are Two Completely Different Things Tour (2025)

American hard rock band Guns N' Roses toured throughout Asia, Europe and North America in 2023. The tour began on 1 June 2023 at the Etihad Arena and concluded on 5 November 2023 at the Hell & Heaven Metal Festival. The tour was marked by the inclusion of songs that had not been performed in a long time (notably "Anything Goes", "Bad Obsession", "Pretty Tied Up" and "Down On The Farm"). On August 18, 2023, at PNC Park in Pittsburgh, the band debuted the new single "Perhaps", which was released on digital platforms on the same date. "The General", later released as the B-side on the "Perhaps" 7-inch vinyl in December, was performed live for the first time at the Hollywood Bowl on November 2, 2023. It was the last tour to feature drummer Frank Ferrer before his departure in March 2025.

== Tour dates ==
List of 2023 concerts, showing date, city, country, venue, opening act, tickets sold, number of available tickets, and amount of gross revenue
Date	City	Country	Venue	Opening act	Attendance	Revenue
June 1, 2023	Abu Dhabi	United Arab Emirates	Etihad Arena	Girish and the Chronicles	—	—
June 5, 2023	Tel Aviv	Israel	Park Hayarkon	Eifo HaYeled	—	—
June 9, 2023	Madrid	Spain	Cívitas Metropolitano	The Pretenders	—	—
June 12, 2023	Vigo	Spain	Estadio Abanca Balaidos	The Pretenders	—	—
June 15, 2023 (Note: The performance in Dessel on June 15, 2023, was part of Graspop Metal Meeting.)	Dessel	Belgium	Festivalpark Stenehei	—N/a	—N/a	—N/a
June 17, 2023 (Note: The performance in Copenhagen on June 17, 2023, was part of Copenhell.)	Copenhagen	Denmark	Refshaleøen	—N/a	—N/a	—N/a
June 21, 2023 (Note: The performance in Oslo on June 21, 2023, was part of Tons of Rock.)	Oslo	Norway	Ekebergsletta	—N/a	—N/a	—N/a
June 24, 2023 (Note: The performance in Pilton on June 24, 2023, was part of Glastonbury Festival)	Pilton	England	Worthy Farm	—N/a	—N/a	—N/a
June 27, 2023	Glasgow	Scotland	Bellahouston Park	The Pretenders	—	—
June 30, 2023 (Note: The performance in London on June 30, 2023, was part of British Summer Time)	London	England	Hyde Park	—N/a	—N/a	—N/a
July 3, 2023	Frankfurt	Germany	Deutsche Bank Park	The Pretenders	—	—
July 5, 2023	Bern	Switzerland	Bernexpo	The Pretenders	—	—
July 8, 2023	Rome	Italy	Circo Massimo	The Pretenders	—	—
July 11, 2023	Weert (Note: Originally scheduled at Megaland in Landgraaf with The Pretenders as the opening act, but relocated to Evenemententerrein Weert Noord in Weert without an opening act.)	Netherlands	Evenemententerrein Weert Noord	—N/a	—	—
July 13, 2023	Paris	France	Paris La Défense Arena	Generation Sex	—	—
July 16, 2023	Bucharest	Romania	Arena Națională	Phil Campbell and the Bastard Sons	—	—
July 19, 2023	Budapest	Hungary	Puskás Aréna	Phil Campbell and the Bastard Sons	—	—
July 22, 2023	Athens	Greece	Olympic Stadium	The Last Internationale	—	—
August 5, 2023	Moncton	Canada	Croix-Bleue Medavie Stadium	Carrie Underwood	—	—
August 8, 2023	Montreal	Canada	Parc Jean-Drapeau	Carrie Underwood	—	—
August 11, 2023	Hershey	United States	Hersheypark Stadium	The Pretenders	—	—
August 15, 2023	East Rutherford	United States	MetLife Stadium	The Pretenders	—	—
August 18, 2023	Pittsburgh	United States	PNC Park	The Pretenders	—	—
August 21, 2023	Boston	United States	Fenway Park	The Pretenders	—	—
August 24, 2023	Chicago	United States	Wrigley Field	The Pretenders	—	—
August 26, 2023	Nashville	United States	Geodis Park	Carrie Underwood	—	—
August 29, 2023	Charlotte	United States	Spectrum Center	Dirty Honey	—	—
September 1, 2023	Saratoga Springs	United States	Saratoga Performing Arts Center	Dirty Honey	25,000	—
September 3, 2023	Toronto	Canada	Rogers Centre	The Pretenders	—	—
September 6, 2023	Lexington	United States	Rupp Arena	Dirty Honey	—	—
September 12, 2023	Knoxville	United States	Thompson-Boling Arena	Dirty Honey	—	—
September 15, 2023	Hollywood	United States	Hard Rock Live	The Warning	—	—
September 17, 2023 (Note: The performance in Atlanta on September 17, 2023, was part of Music Midtown.)	Atlanta	United States	Piedmont Park	—N/a	—N/a	—N/a
September 20, 2023	Biloxi	United States	Mississippi Coast Coliseum	Dirty Honey	—	—
September 23, 2023	Kansas City	United States	Kauffman Stadium	Alice in Chains	—	—
September 26, 2023	San Antonio	United States	Alamodome	Alice in Chains	—	—
September 28, 2023	Houston	United States	Minute Maid Park	Alice in Chains	—	—
October 1, 2023	San Diego	United States	Snapdragon Stadium	Alice in Chains	—	—
October 6, 2023 (Note: The performance in Indio on October 6, 2023, was part of Power Trip Festival.)	Indio	United States	Empire Polo Club	—N/a	—N/a	—N/a
October 8, 2023 (Note: The performance in Sacramento on October 8, 2023, was part of Aftershock Festival.)	Sacramento	United States	Discovery Park	—N/a	—N/a	—N/a
October 11, 2023	Phoenix	United States	Talking Stick Resort Amphitheatre (Note: Original venue was Chase Field but changed to Talking Stick Resort Amphitheatre due to MLB playoffs.)	Alice in Chains	—	—
October 14, 2023	Seattle	United States	Climate Pledge Arena	Ayron Jones	—	—
October 16, 2023	Vancouver	Canada	BC Place	Alice in Chains	—	—
October 19, 2023	Edmonton	Canada	Rogers Place	Ghost Hounds	—N/a	—N/a
October 22, 2023	Nampa	United States	Ford Idaho Center	Ghost Hounds	—N/a	—N/a
October 24, 2023	Salt Lake City	United States	Delta Center	Ghost Hounds	—N/a	—N/a
October 27, 2023	Denver	United States	Ball Arena	Ayron Jones	—N/a	—N/a
November 1, 2023	Los Angeles	United States	Hollywood Bowl	The Black Keys	—N/a	—N/a
November 2, 2023	Los Angeles	United States	Hollywood Bowl	The Black Keys	—N/a	—N/a
November 5, 2023 (Note: The performance in Toluca on November 5, 2023, was part of Hell & Heaven Metal Fest.)	Toluca	Mexico	Foro Pegaso	—N/a	—N/a	—N/a
Total					—	—

=== Cancelled dates ===
List of concerts, showing date, city, country, venue, and reason for cancellation
Date	City	Country	Venue	Reason
September 9, 2023	St. Louis	United States	Busch Stadium	Illness

== Personnel ==
=== Guns N' Roses ===
- Axl Rose – lead vocals, piano, percussion
- Slash – lead guitar, talkbox, slide guitar
- Duff McKagan – bass, backing vocals, lead vocals
- Dizzy Reed – keyboards, piano, percussion, backing vocals
- Richard Fortus – rhythm guitar, lead guitar, backing vocals
- Frank Ferrer – drums, percussion
- Melissa Reese – keyboards, synthesizers, sub-bass, programming, percussion, backing vocals

=== Guests ===
- Dave Grohl – vocals and guitar during the song "Paradise City" (June 24, 2023)
- Carrie Underwood – vocals during the songs "Sweet Child o' Mine" and "Paradise City" (August 5, 2023; August 8, 2023; August 26, 2023)
- Bubbles – vocals during the song "Knockin' on Heaven's Door" (August 5, 2023)
- Chrissie Hynde – harmonica during the song "Bad Obsession" (August 21, 2023)
- Mike McCready – guitar during the song "Paradise City" (October 14, 2023)
