= Perhaps (song) =

2023 single by Guns N' Roses

Single by Guns N' Roses
- B-side: "The General"
- Released: August 18, 2023
- Recorded: 1999–2001; 2020–2023 (overdubs)
- Length: 3:48
- Label: Geffen
- Songwriters: Axl Rose; Duff McKagan; Slash; Paul Tobias
- Producers: Axl Rose; Caram Costanzo

Guns N' Roses singles chronology
| "Hard Skool" (2021) | "Perhaps" (2023) | "The General" (2023) |

Audio
- "Perhaps" on YouTube

Music video
- "Perhaps" on YouTube

"Perhaps" is a song by the American hard rock band Guns N' Roses, released as a single on August 18, 2023. A limited edition 7-inch vinyl, with "The General" as its "R-side", was originally scheduled to be released on October 27, 2023 but the release was postponed to December 8, 2023. Like the band's previous two singles, "Absurd" and "Hard Skool", the origins of this song date back to the writing and recording process of Chinese Democracy from the late 1990s.

== Background ==
"Perhaps" was originally recorded during the Chinese Democracy sessions in 2000, and was leaked online in 2019 alongside other tracks from the same era.

The song was rehearsed at the soundcheck for the Tel Aviv concert on June 5, 2023, and again before the band's Glasgow concert on June 27, 2023. Prior to the release, the song was leaked through digital jukeboxes in bars across the United States. The song features drumming from former band member Brain.

"Perhaps" was first played live on August 18, 2023, at PNC Park in Pittsburgh, Pennsylvania.

The music video for the song shows footage of the band live and backstage during the European leg of the 2023 Tour.

The single's "R-side" "The General" was announced to be the B-side to "Perhaps" and the vinyl originally set for release on October 27 but since the band was not happy with the quality, it was pushed back for December 8.

== Reception ==
Rolling Stone called the piano-driven track good and described it as being "mid-tempo rocker in the vein of Use Your Illusion II's more mellow "Yesterdays" or Chinese Democracy's standout "Catcher in the Rye"". In its positive review, Billboard described the song as "a twisty, turgid ballad" featuring "a piano-pounding riff", "Rose's signature howl" and "one of Slash's classic hurricane solos". Ultimate Classic Rock' ranked it fourth out of the six post-reunion singles, stating ""Perhaps" picks up where the Use Your Illusion albums left off: a peppy, Elton John-style piano rocker featuring remorseful lyrics and biting, multi-tracked vocals. It's easy to see how "Perhaps" could have fit on Chinese Democracy alongside similar piano-based songs... If there's a downside to the song, it's the pedestrian rhythm section and uninspired guitar solo. Still, the bones of a solid song are here.

== Track listing ==
7-inch vinyl

'G' side
| No. | Title | Writer(s) | Length |
|---|---|---|---|
| 1. | "Perhaps" | Axl Rose, Slash, Duff McKagan, Paul Tobias | 3:48 |

'R' side
| No. | Title | Writer(s) | Length |
|---|---|---|---|
| 2. | "The General" | Rose, Slash, McKagan, Brain, Steve Freeman, Marc Haggard | 4:22 |

== Personnel ==
Guns N' Roses

- Axl Rose – vocals, piano, production
- Slash – guitar
- Duff McKagan – bass, backing vocals
- Dizzy Reed – keyboards
- Richard Fortus – guitar
- Brain – drums

Additional credits

- Caram Costanzo – keyboards, production, engineer
- Eric Caudieux, Sean Beavan – additional engineering
- Joe Barresi – mixer
- Bob Ludwig – mastering engineer

== Charts ==
Chart performance for "Perhaps"
| Chart (2023) | Peak position |
|---|---|
| Croatia (HRT) | 93 |
| Japan (Oricon) | 21 |
| New Zealand Hot Singles (RMNZ) | 40 |
| UK Rock & Metal (OCC) | 36 |
| US Digital Song Sales (Billboard) | 24 |
| US Hot Rock & Alternative Songs (Billboard) | 48 |
