= Hacienda Xmatkuil =

- Site of the Yucatán State Fair
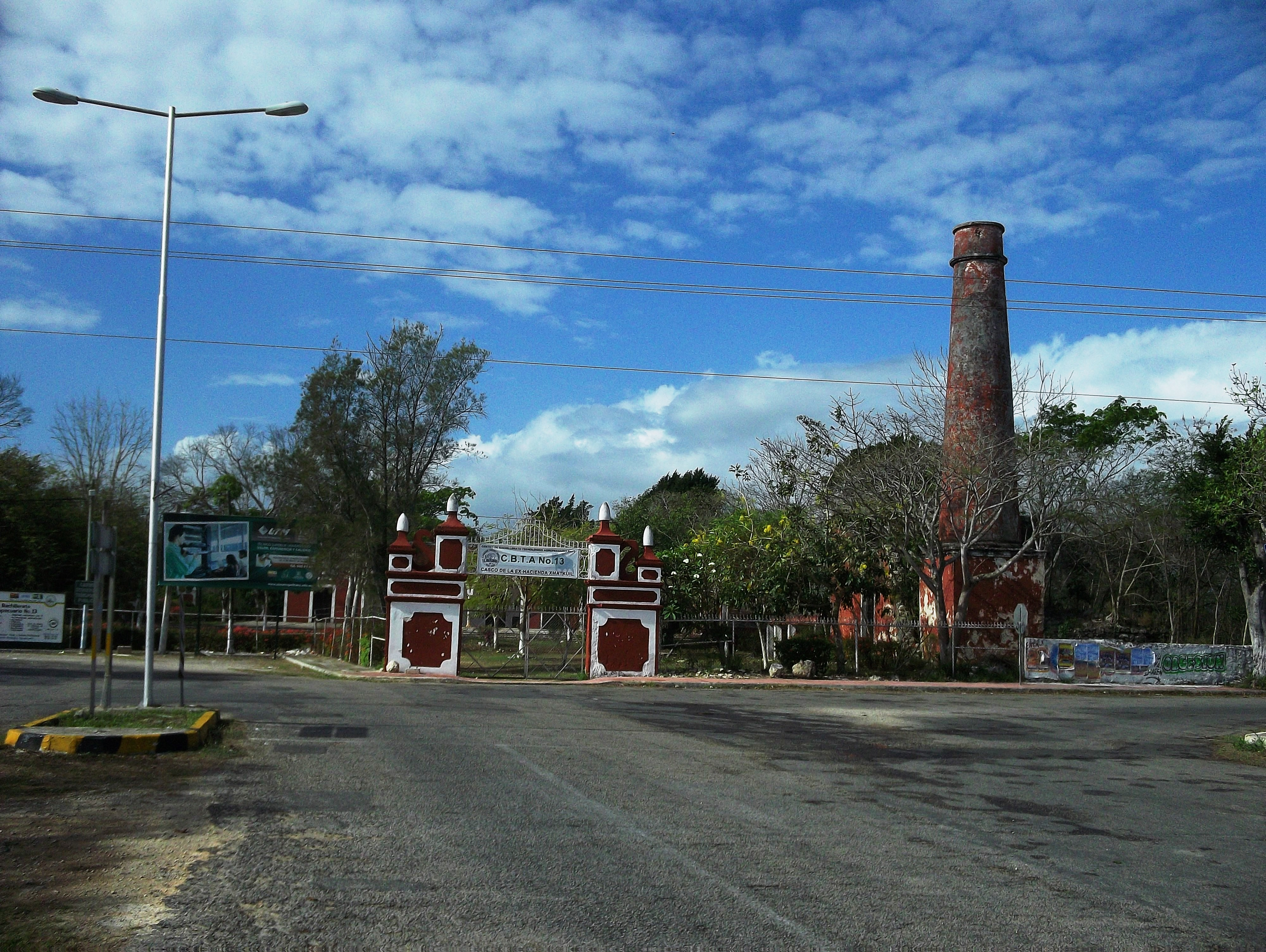
- Entrance Hacienda Xmatkuil, Yucatán.

- Cuxtal Ecological Reserve

- Location in Mexico
- Coordinates: 20°51′41″N 89°37′28″W
- Country: Mexico
- Mexican States: Yucatán
- Municipalities: Mérida Municipality
- Time zone: UTC−6 (CST)
  - Summer (DST): UTC−5 (CDT)
- Postal code: 97316
- Area code: 999

Hacienda Xmatkuil (Spanish pronunciation: [iʃmaðˈkwil]) is located in the Mérida Municipality in the state of Yucatán in southeastern Mexico. It is one of the properties that arose during the nineteenth century henequen boom. It is part of the Cuxtal Ecological Reserve, which was set aside in 1993 to protect both the artificial and natural history of the reserve area of Mérida.

Since 1974, the former hacienda has served as the site of the Yucatán State Fair and features agricultural events, competitions and fair rides each November.

== Toponymy ==
The name (Xmatkuil) comes from the Mayan language and means "the place where you pray to God".

== How to get there ==
The property is located 10 km south of Mérida on Calle 50.

== History ==
The Hacienda Xmatkuil was originally used for agricultural purposes and during the henequen boom was dedicated to sisal production. In 1974, the former grounds became an exhibition location for the county fair. Initially, the event was limited to showing livestock, industrial equipment, agricultural produce and artisan products, but it quickly expanded with restaurants, competitions in art and sports, and other events to become the largest fair on the Yucatán Peninsula. The current event, which occurs annually on the second weekend of November, includes arts and crafts show, livestock shows, rodeo events, concerts, sporting events, a dog show, and a children's petting zoo. It usually runs through 3 weekends.

On 28 June 1993, the Cuxtal Ecological Reserve was designated to protect the history of the 7 large haciendas, their adjoining pueblas, 12 minor archaeological sites, 6 cenotes and one of Merida's important water supply stations. Hacienda Xmatkuil was part of this historic designation.

Within the reserve are the following protected haciendas:

- Hacienda Hunxectamán in the village of Uxec Taman.
- Hacienda San Antonio Tahdzibichén.
- Hacienda San Ignacio Tesip in the village of Tesip.
- Hacienda San Nicolás Dzoyaxché, which contains Cenote Dzonot-Ich on its grounds.
- Hacienda San Pedro Chimay.
- Hacienda Santa Cruz Palomeque.
- Hacienda Xmatkuil.

== Demographics ==
All of the henequen plantations ceased to exist as autonomous communities with the agrarian land reform implemented by President Lázaro Cárdenas in 1937. His decree turned the haciendas into collective ejidos, leaving only 150 hectares to the former landowners for use as private property. Figures before 1937 indicate populations living on the farm. After 1937, figures indicate those living in the community, as the remaining Hacienda Xmatkuil houses only the owner's immediate family.

According to the 2005 census conducted by the INEGI, the population of the city was 357 inhabitants, of whom 189 were men and 168 were women.

Population of Xmatkuil by year
Year	1900	1910	1921	1930	1940	1950	1960	1970	1980	1990	1995	2000	2005
Population	125	?	238	195	156	126	149	400	202	250	258	336	357

== Bibliography ==
- Bracamonte, P and Solís, R., Los espacios de autonomía maya, Ed. UADY, Mérida, 1997.
- Gobierno del Estado de Yucatán, "Los municipios de Yucatán", 1988.
- Kurjack, Edward y Silvia Garza, Atlas arqueológico del Estado de Yucatán, Ed. INAH, 1980.
- Patch, Robert, La formación de las estancias y haciendas en Yucatán durante la colonia, Ed. UADY, 1976.
- Peón Ancona, J. F., "Las antiguas haciendas de Yucatán", en Diario de Yucatán, Mérida, 1971.

== Photo gallery ==
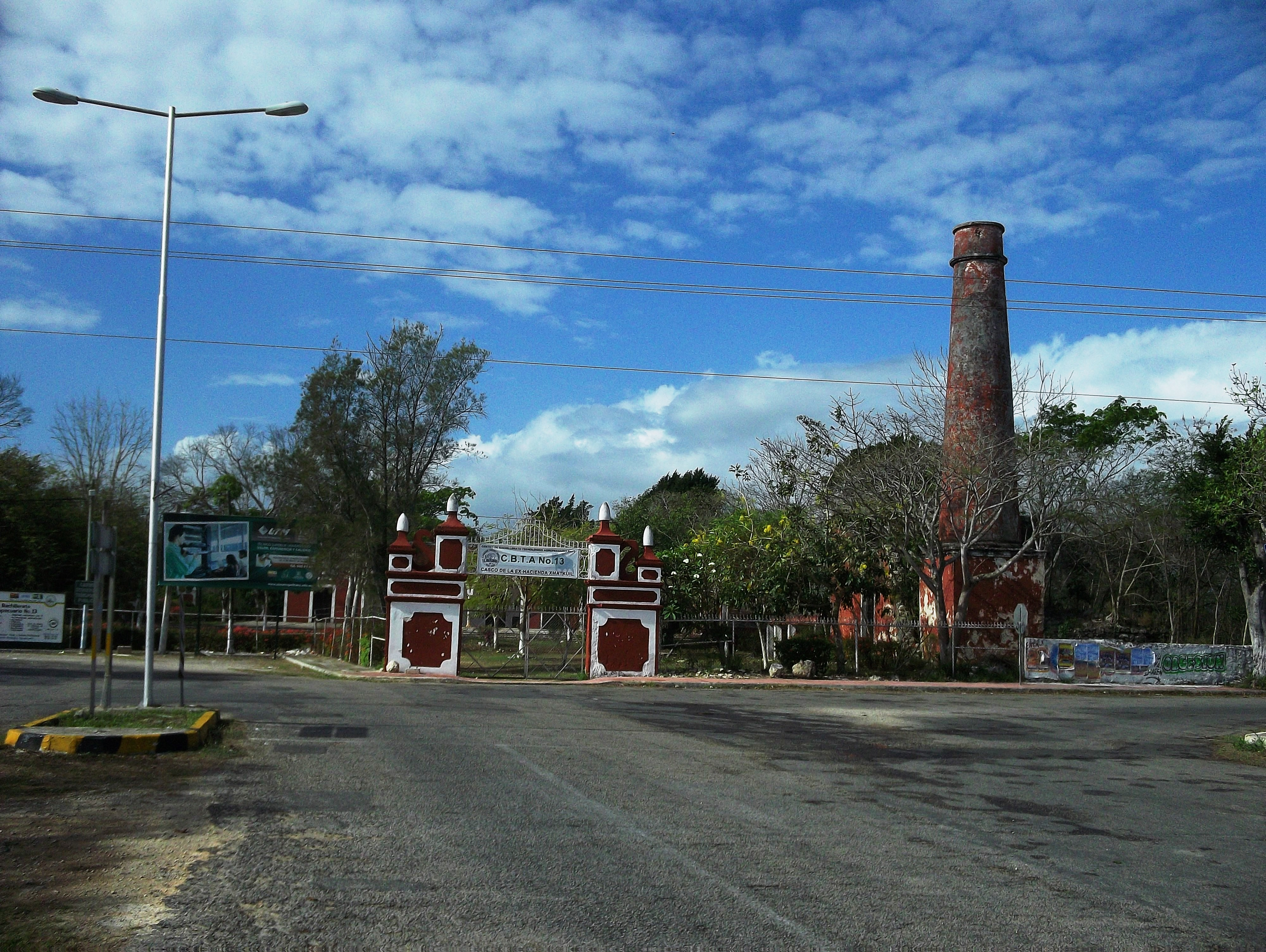
View of the Hacienda Xmatkuil

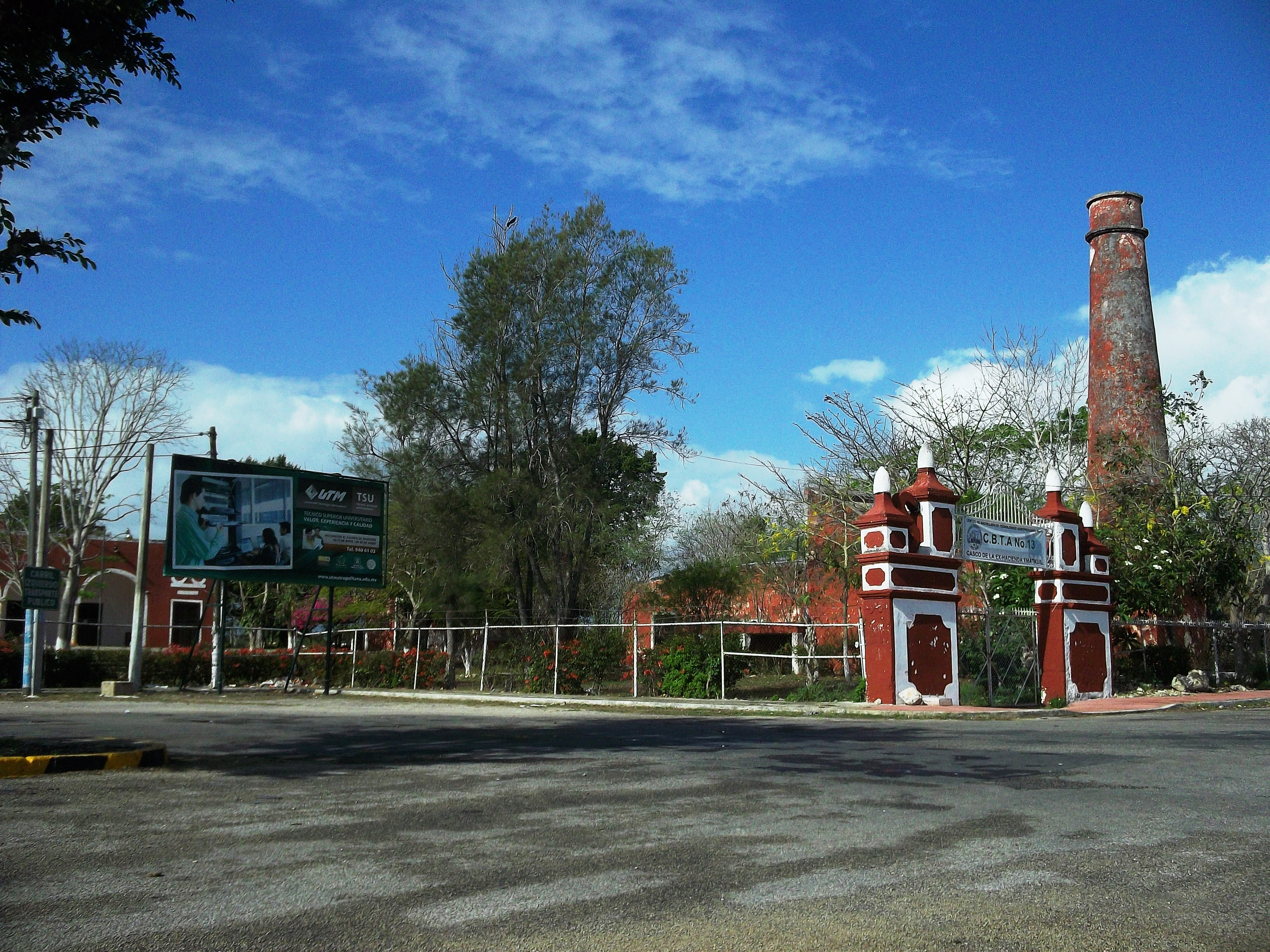
View of the Hacienda Xmatkuil

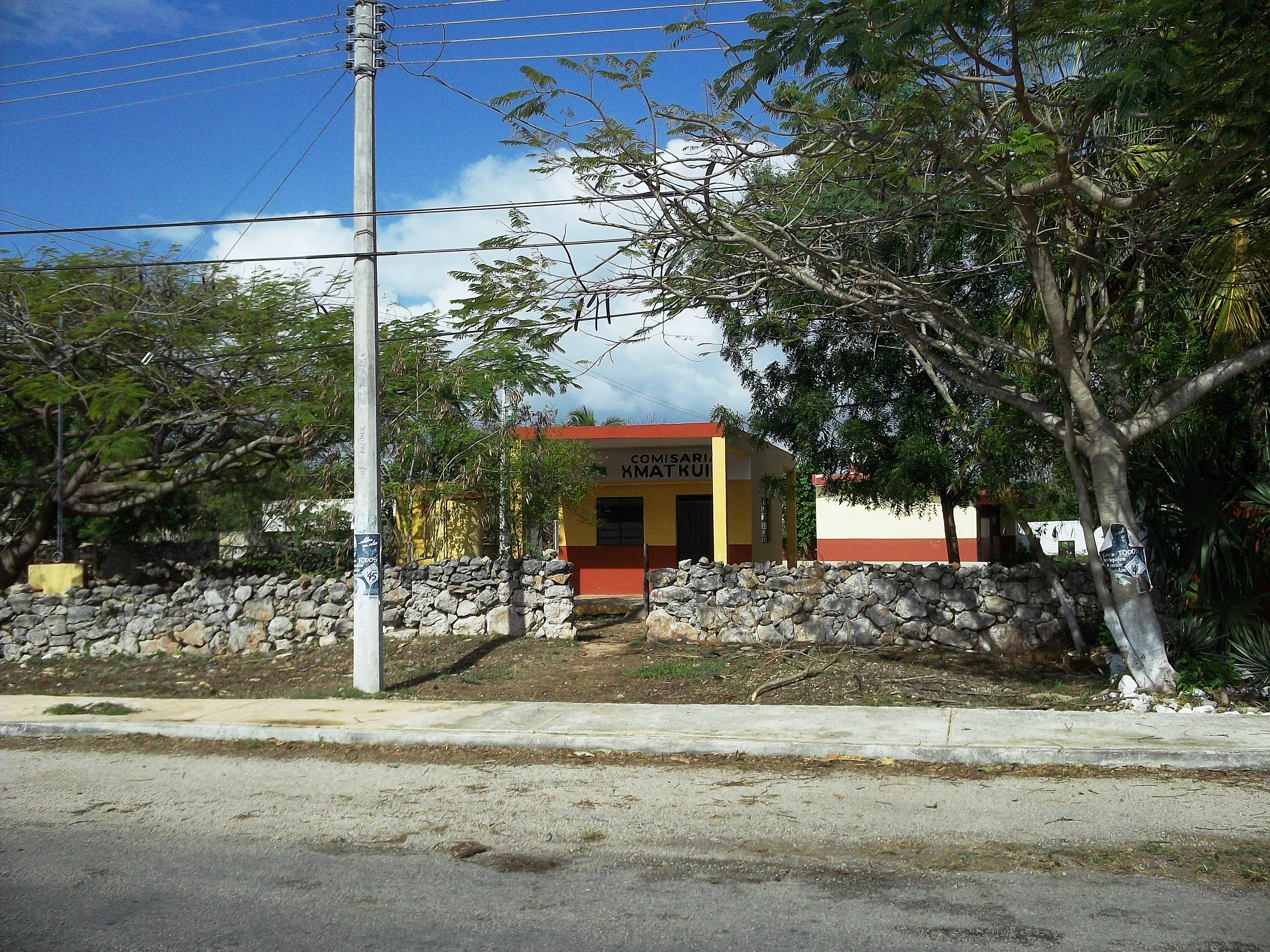
Company Store of the Hacienda Xmatkuil

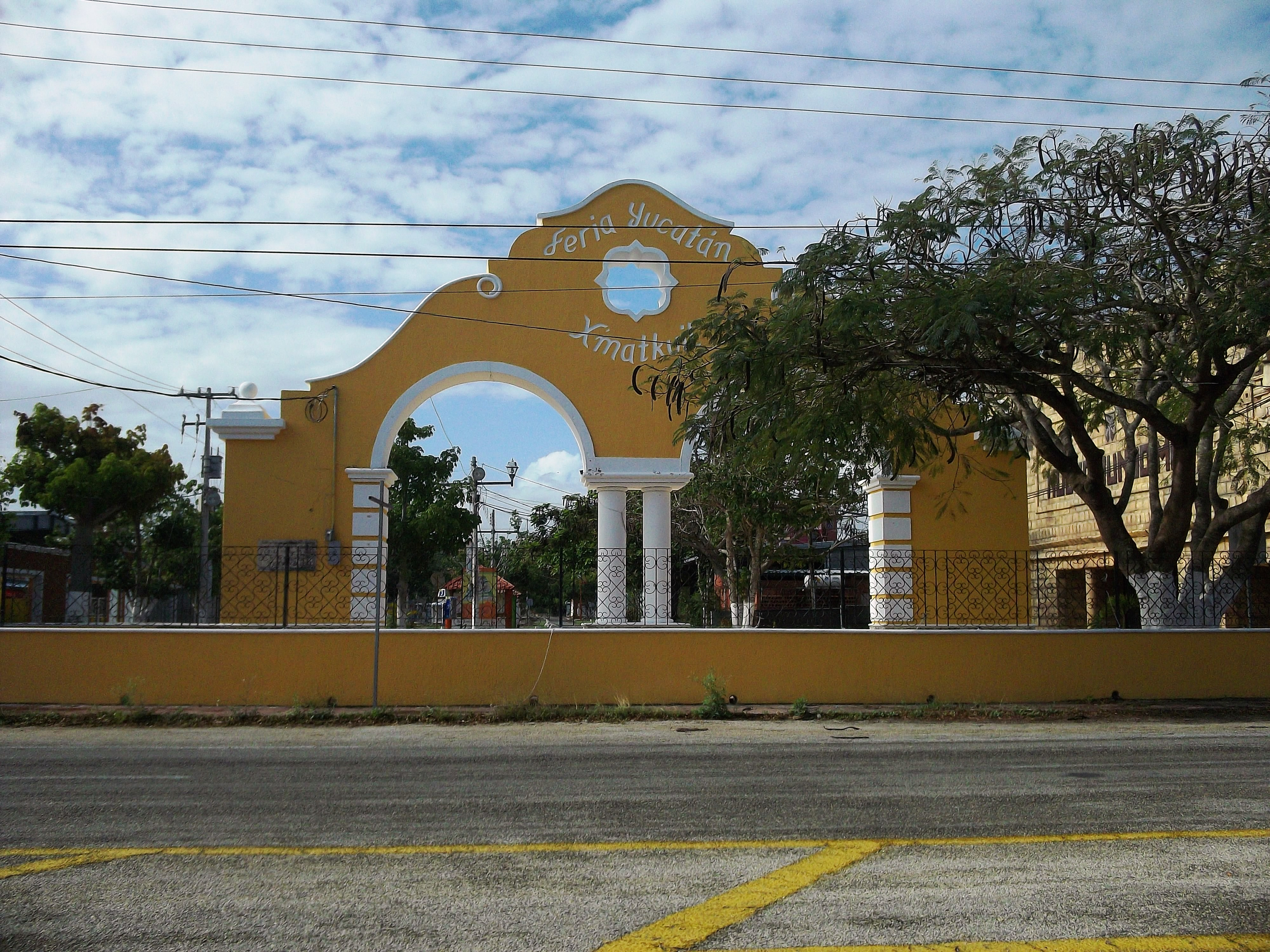
Facilities of the trade fair at Xmatkuil

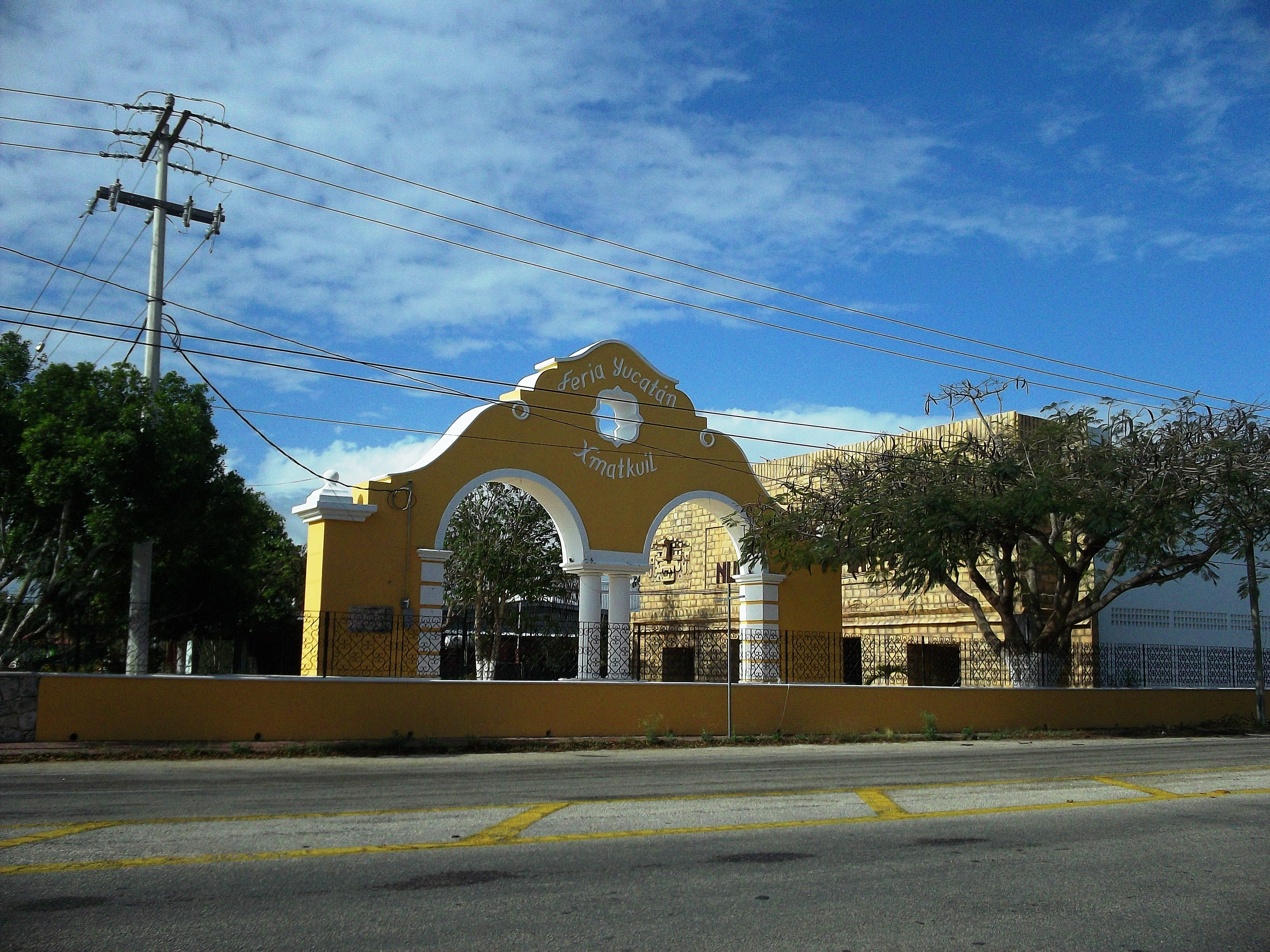
Facilities of the trade fair at Xmatkuil

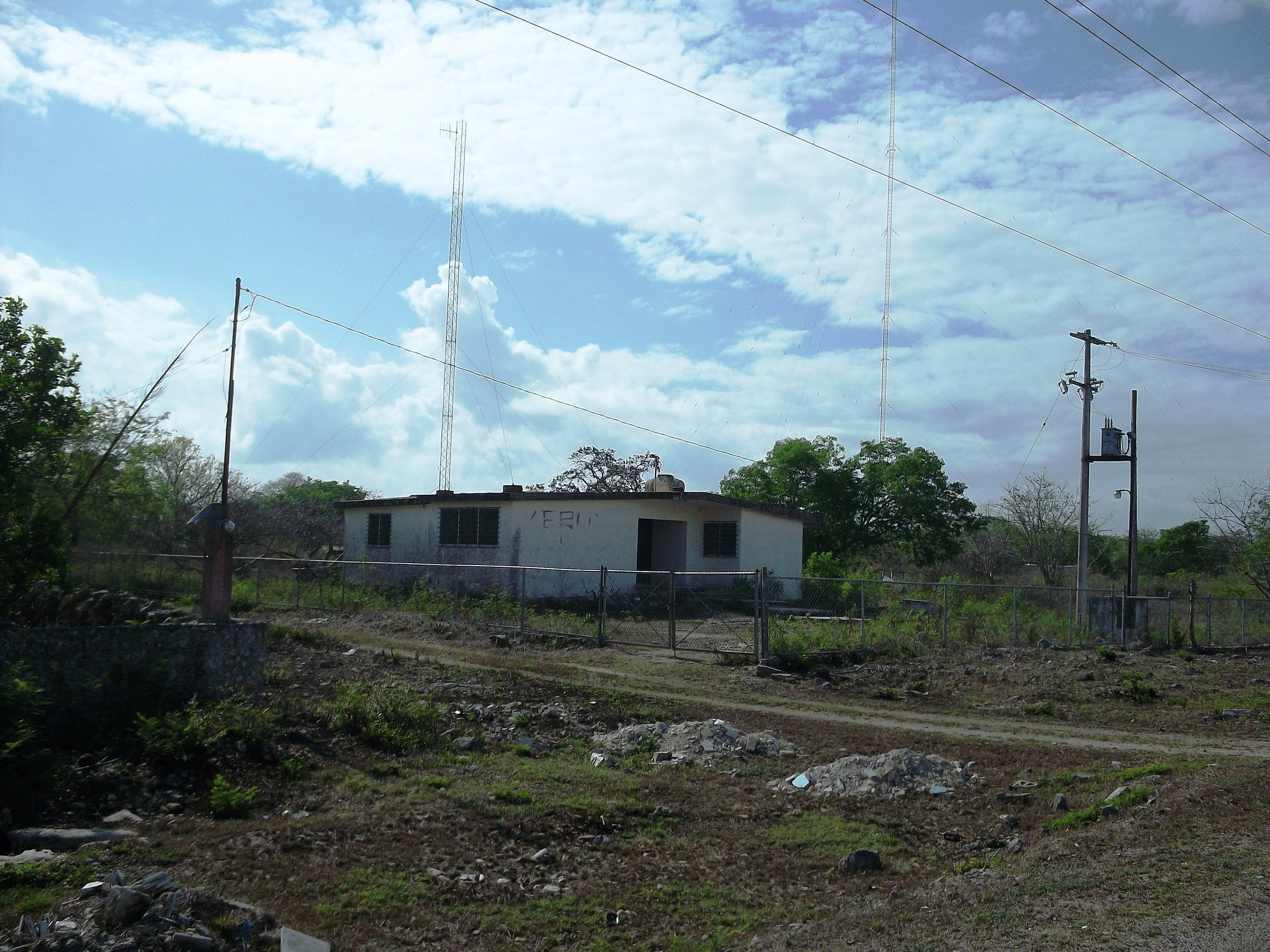
XERUY Yucatan Radio

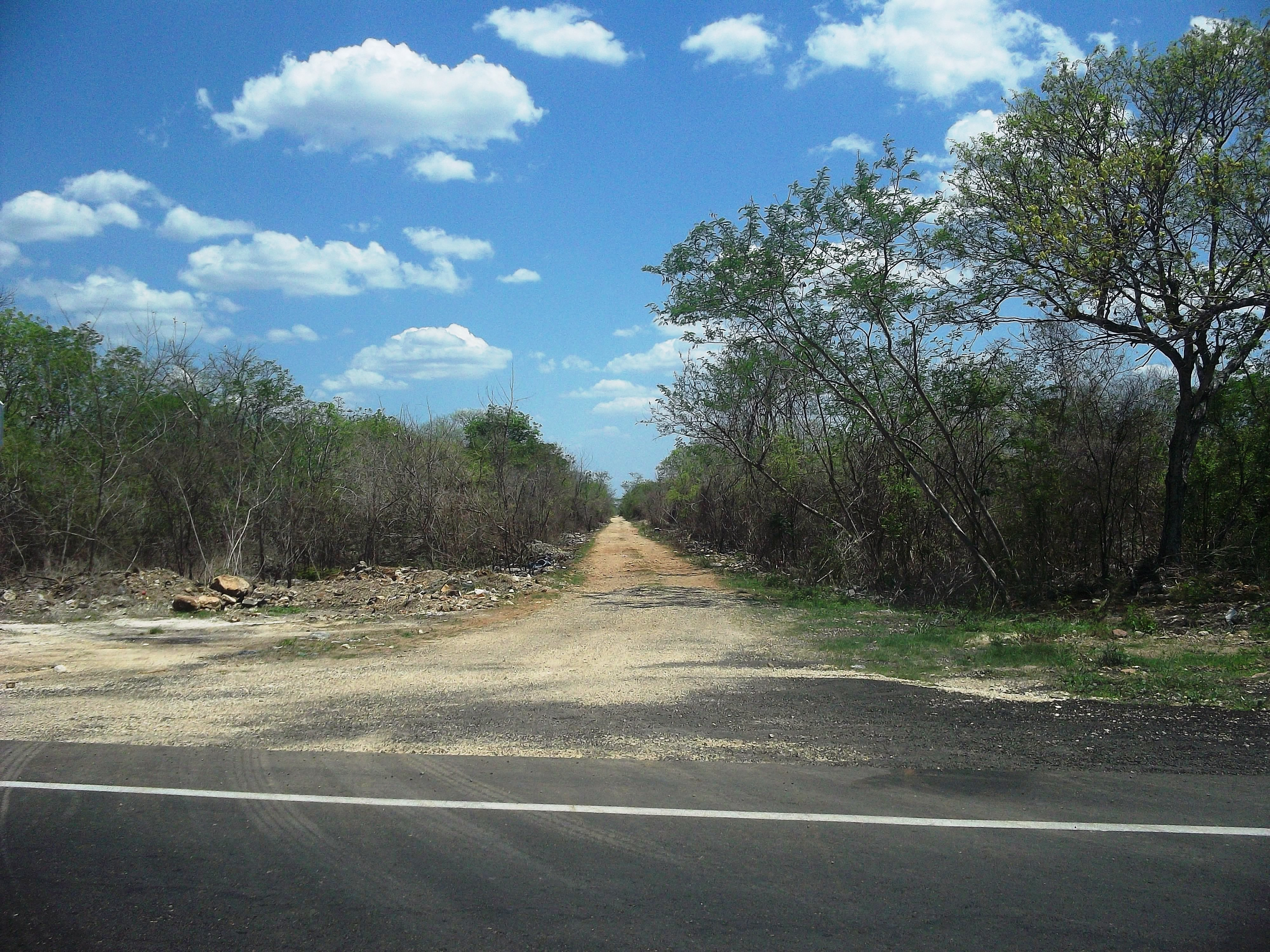
Former railway track toward Molas

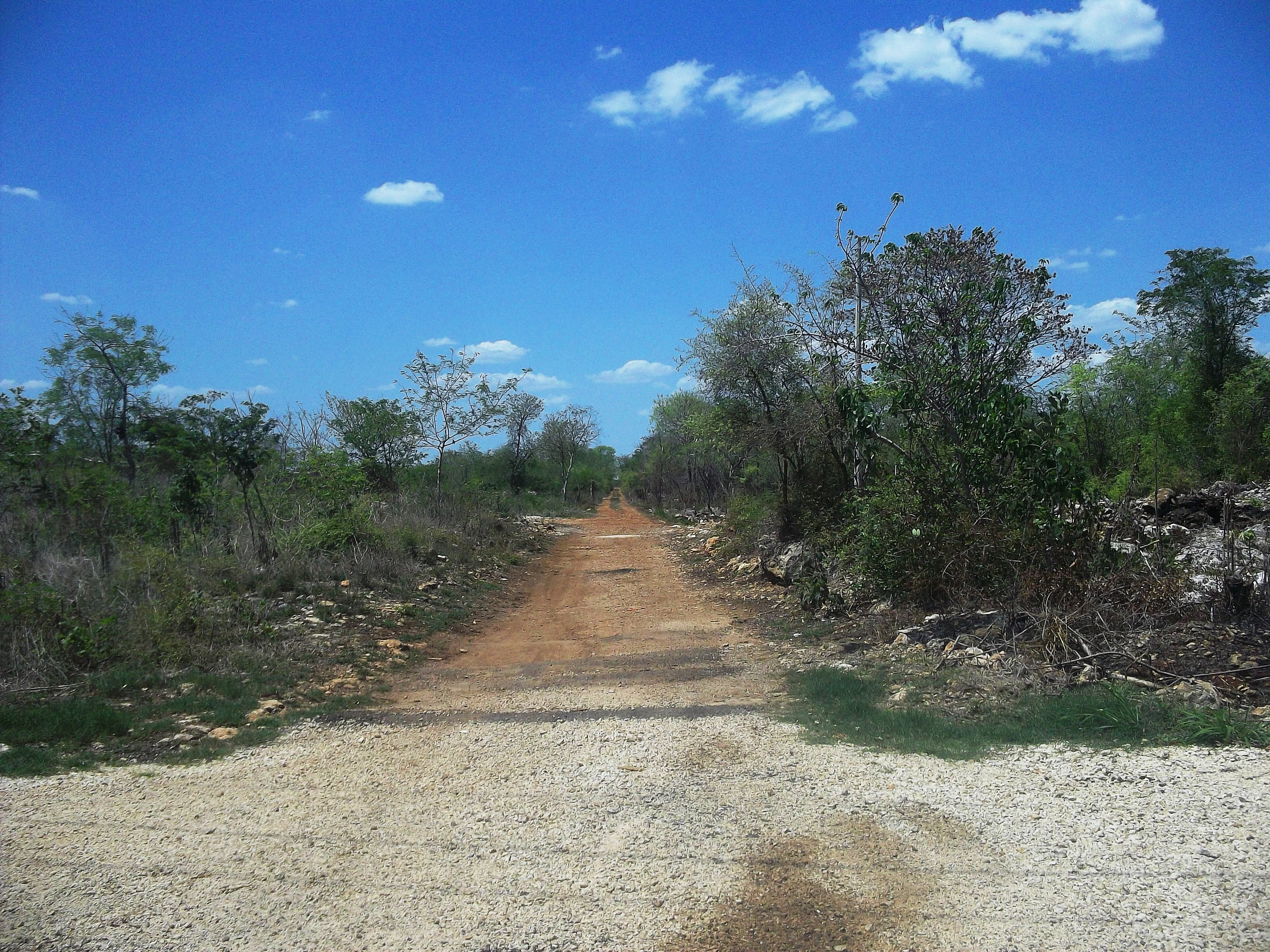
Former railway track toward Mérida
