= Hard Skool =

Guns N' Roses EP with new singles

EP / single by Guns N' Roses
- Released: January 28, 2022
- Genres: Hard rock; alternative metal; punk rock; industrial rock
- Length: 15:52
- Labels: Geffen; UMG
- Producers: Axl Rose; Caram Costanzo

Guns N' Roses chronology
Appetite for Destruction: Locked N' Loaded (2018)	Hard Skool (2022)	Use Your Illusion Super Deluxe (2022)

Guns N' Roses singles chronology
"Absurd" (2021)	"Hard Skool" (2021)	"Perhaps" (2023)

Audio
- "Hard Skool" on YouTube

Lyric Video
- "Hard Skool" on YouTube

Hard Skool is a single and the fourth extended play by the American hard rock band Guns N' Roses. The single was released on September 24, 2021, with the EP following on January 28, 2022. The EP consists of two singles and two live tracks, and is their first EP release with guitarist Slash and bassist Duff McKagan since they rejoined the band in 2016, as well as the first works to feature new keyboardist Melissa Reese.

== Background ==
Slash and McKagan left Guns N’ Roses in the late '90s, with Slash and vocalist Axl Rose having a longstanding public feud until repairing their relationship in 2015. A year later Slash and McKagan rejoined the band for the record-setting Not in This Lifetime… Tour, with the band stating they intended to make new music.

The tracks "Absurd" and "Hard Skool" were initially recorded during the Chinese Democracy sessions, although an earlier version of "Hard Skool" might have been written in 1996. A snippet of "Hard Skool" was posted online in 2006 under the title "Checkmate". In 2008, Rose mentioned that the working title of the song was "Jackie Chan". The full version from the Chinese Democracy sessions, under the name "Hard School", leaked in 2019.

"Hard Skool" was first performed by members of the band at soundcheck before the last concert of the canceled — due to the COVID-19 pandemic — tour on March 14, 2020, and then in August and September 2021. It was then released as a single on September 24. The track peaked at number 9 on the Billboard Mainstream Rock Airplay chart. The official lyric video of the song debuted on Good Morning Football on December 3, 2021.

The Hard Skool EP was announced on September 25, 2021 and slated for release on February 25, 2022. Exclusive to the band's online store, it features live versions of "You're Crazy" and "Don't Cry", songs originally released on 1987's Appetite for Destruction and 1991's Use Your Illusion I, respectively. The Hard Skool CD and cassette, as well as the 7-inch single featuring a live version of "Absurd" as B-side, eventually became available earlier than originally announced, on January 28, 2022. A second 7-inch vinyl version was released June 2022 to the Nightrain fan club. It features "Hard Skool" and a new live version of "Shadow of Your Love".

== Reception ==
"Hard Skool" was well received, with several publications describing it as "vintage" Guns N' Roses. Ultimate Classic Rock ranked the song second out of the six post-reunion singles, saying "This brisk rocker is the closest GN'R have gotten to their "vintage" sound since reuniting, full of taut riffs, economical solos and blistering vocals. It's damn catchy to boot. "Hard Skool" isn't perfect. Once again, there's a strange production sheen over Rose's vocals, making the gap between the initial recording and contemporary overdubs all the more apparent. The official version also cuts the more ambitious elements of the previously circulated demo. Nevertheless, it gets points for its catchiness and verve."

== Track listing ==
CD, cassette
No.	Title	Writer(s)	Length
1.	"Hard Skool"	Axl Rose, Slash, Duff McKagan, Robin Finck, Josh Freese, Tommy Stinson, Paul Tobias	3:41
2.	"Absurd"	Rose, Dizzy Reed, Slash, McKagan	3:23
3.	"Don't Cry" (live)	Rose, Izzy Stradlin	4:24
4.	"You're Crazy" (live)	Guns N' Roses	4:24
Total length:			15:52

7-inch vinyl
No.	Title	Writer(s)	Length
1.	"Hard Skool"	Rose, Slash, McKagan, Finck, Freese, Stinson, Tobias	3:41
2.	"Absurd" (live)	Rose, Reed, Slash, McKagan	3:40

Transparent vinyl
No.	Title	Writer(s)	Length
1.	"Hard Skool"	Rose, Slash, McKagan, Finck, Freese, Stinson, Tobias	3:41
2.	"Absurd" (live)	Rose, Reed, Slash, McKagan	3:40
3.	"Shadow of Your Love" (live)	Rose, Stradlin, Tobias	2:55

== Charts ==
Weekly chart performance for "Hard Skool"
Chart (2021–2022)	Peak position
Hungary (Single Top 40)	25
Japan Hot Overseas (Billboard Japan)	13
Japan (Oricon)	18
US Mainstream Rock (Billboard)	9

== Personnel ==
Guns N' Roses

- Axl Rose – lead vocals, piano, production, programming
- Slash – lead guitar
- Duff McKagan – bass guitar, backing vocals
- Dizzy Reed – piano, keyboards, backing vocals, programming
- Richard Fortus – rhythm guitar
- Frank Ferrer – drums, percussion (live tracks only)
- Melissa Reese – keyboards, sub-bass, percussion, backing vocals

Additional credits

- Caram Costanzo – production, mixing, engineer
- Eric Caudieux, Sean Beavan – additional engineering
- Brain – drums, percussion (studio tracks only)
