= Melissa Reese =

American musician (born 1990)

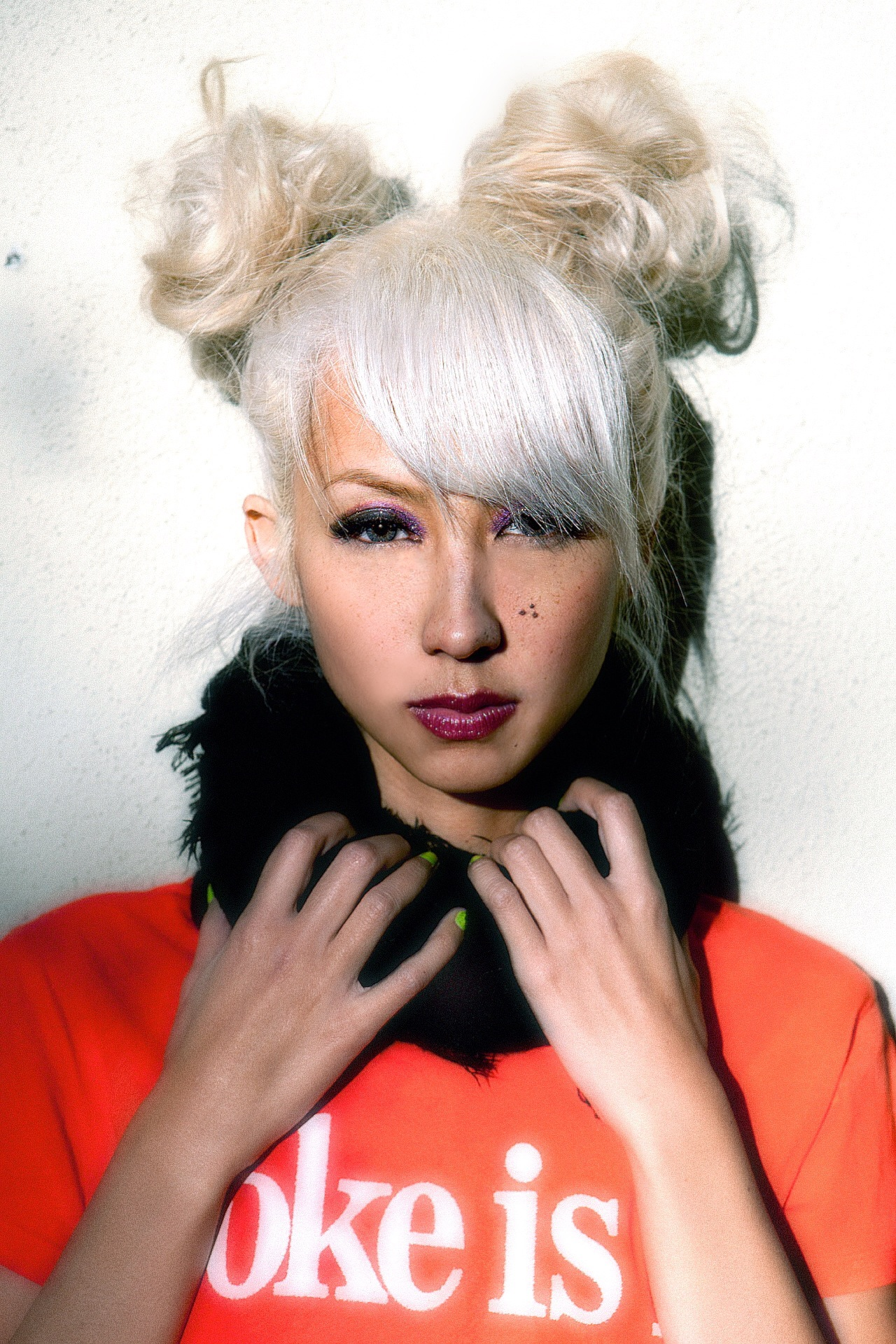
- Reese in 2012

Background information
- Born: March 1, 1990 (age 36); Seattle, Washington, U.S.
- Genres: Hard rock; heavy metal; glam metal; alternative rock; alternative metal; electronica; experimental rock; punk rock
- Occupations: Musician; songwriter; singer; producer
- Instruments: Synthesizers; keyboards; vocals
- Years active: 2006–present
- Label: Geffen
- Member of: Guns N' Roses
- Website: melissareesemusic.com

Melissa Reese (born March 1, 1990) is an American musician who has collaborated frequently with Bryan "Brain" Mantia and is a current member of hard rock band Guns N' Roses.

== Early life ==
Reese was born in Seattle, Washington. She is the youngest of three children.

Reese began singing and playing piano at age 4. She started writing music on the piano at age 12. At 13 years old, her talents were discovered by musician Tom Whitlock, who helped her get into the music industry. When she was 17, she learned Pro Tools, Reason, and Logic Pro then began performing and producing her own music. She attended Roosevelt High School, where she sang in the vocal jazz ensemble. Reese won an outstanding soloist award at the Lionel Hampton Jazz Festival in high school. After graduating school, Reese began experimenting with recording, creating a module that featured a Boss BR-8 and a Roland Groovebox.

In her early 20s, she moved to Los Angeles to study music full-time.

== Career ==
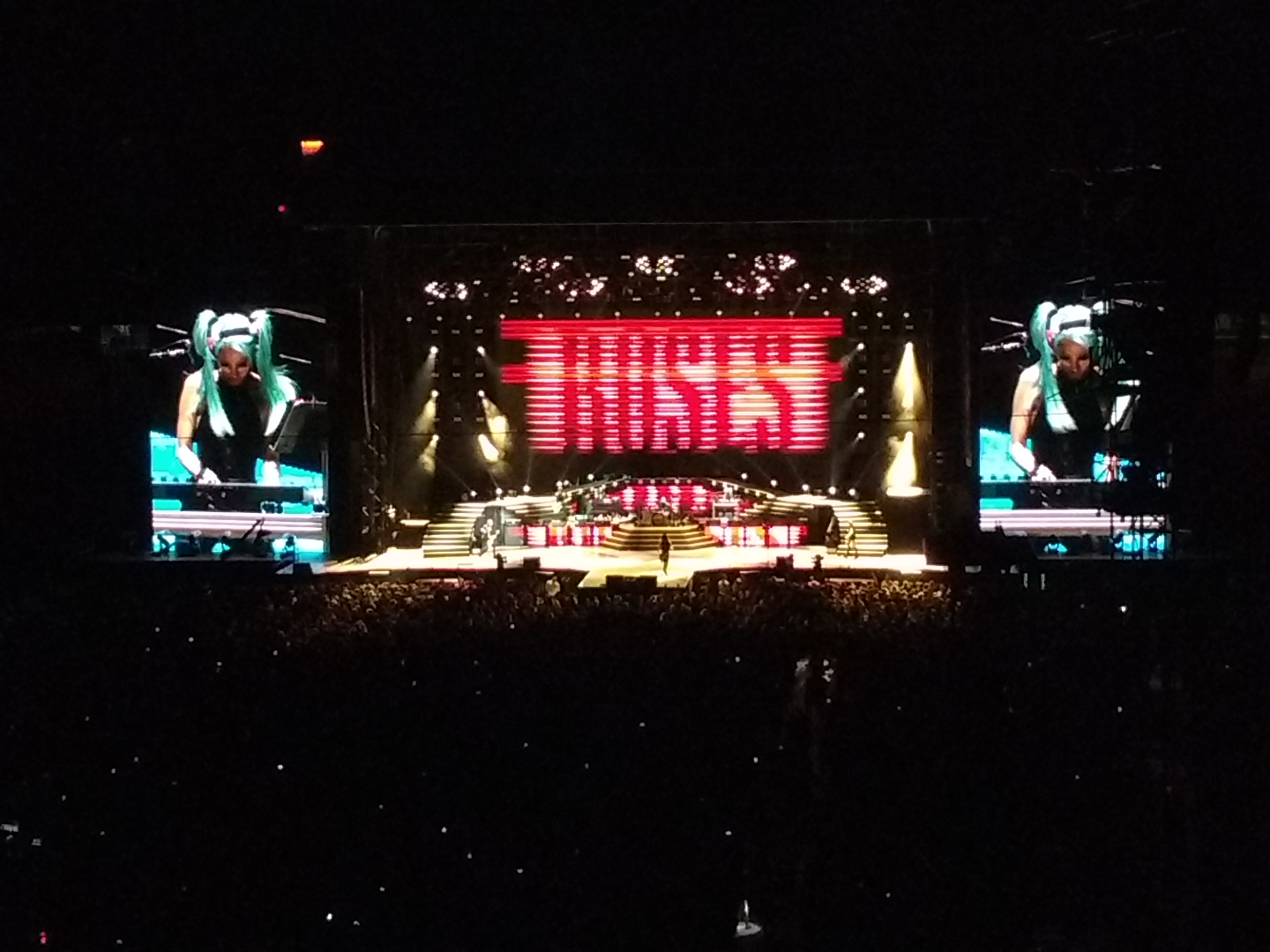
Reese performing with Guns N' Roses in 2016.

Her first EP was released under the name Lissa (2007), and featured collaboration with Bryan Mantia and Pete Scaturro. Three of the songs of the EP were featured in various TV shows, including Gossip Girl and Keeping up with the Kardashians.

Reese has worked with funk artist Bootsy Collins, rapper Chuck D, singer Vanessa Carlton, soul artist Goapele and singer Taylor Swift. In addition to composing, Reese has produced work for artists such as Drumma Boy. She also did work on the soundtrack for the movie The Assignment.

In October 2016, Reese sang "The Star-Spangled Banner" before a Seattle Seahawks game.

=== Brain and Melissa ===
Reese has worked on several projects with Mantia, a composing team dubbed "Brain and Melissa". In 2010, along with Buckethead, they released the multi-CD sets Kind Regards and Best Regards. Brain and Melissa composed part of the soundtrack in the video game Infamous 2, for which they were nominated for "Outstanding Achievement in Original Composition" by the Academy of Interactive Arts and Sciences awards. Other video games the duo worked on include PlayStation Home, ModNation Racers, Twisted Metal, Fantasia: Music Evolved and Infamous: Second Son. They also scored the films Detention and Power/Rangers. They have worked with music video director Joseph Kahn on several television commercials for NASCAR, SEAT, and Qoros. In addition, they scored a commercial for Johnnie Walker Blue which featured a computer-generated Bruce Lee. They also worked on several remixes of songs from Chinese Democracy for a planned remix album. In addition, the two created a stock music album called Eclectic Cinema alongside former Guns N' Roses guitarist Paul Tobias, and Guns N' Roses and Buckethead collaborator Pete Scaturro. They wrote the soundtrack for the Joseph Kahn film Bodied.

The duo performed at a Houston Rockets halftime show on November 10, 2017, performing remixes of "Sorry" and "If the World" from Chinese Democracy, and a cover of Kiss's "Do You Love Me?" from Destroyer. They played another NBA halftime show, this time for the Los Angeles Clippers, on November 27, 2017.

=== Guns N' Roses ===
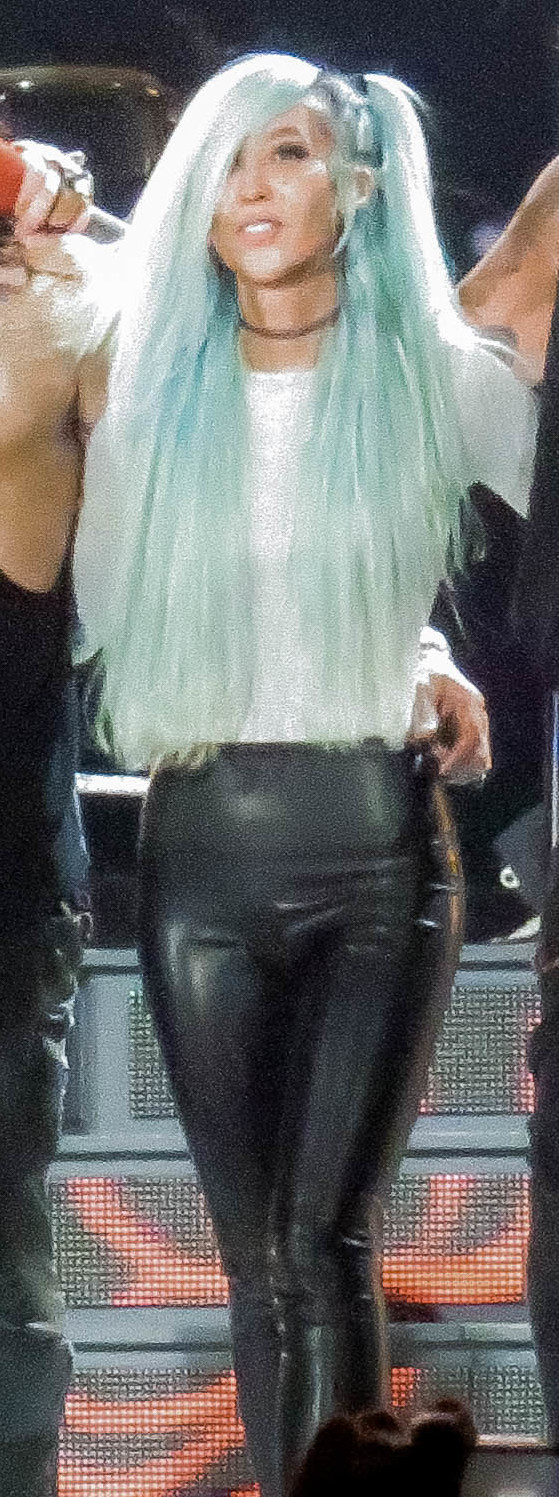
Reese after a Guns N' Roses concert in 2016.

Reese joined Guns N' Roses in March 2016 as the band's second keyboardist, replacing Chris Pitman, while also playing synthesizer, sub-bass, background vocals, and programming for all electronic sounds during live performances. She first performed with the band on the Not in This Lifetime... Tour. Upon joining the band, she had two weeks to learn 50 songs to prepare for the tour, working 15 hours a day to learn them. Reese described how she joined the band, stating "They knew of me as a producer and heard about my poetry work. I knew a lot of people in their camp. It just came up as an idea: what about her? I thought it was a joke." Axl later called her composing partner Brain, and asked "Do I have your blessing on this? [...] Can she pull it off?"

As well as singing backing vocals, Reese's role in the band has been described as the "enhancer", using Akai samplers among other tools to produce sounds from Chinese Democracy songs, and playing the Moog synthesizer on "Paradise City". Speaking of her role, she stated "I don't want to get in the way of these songs. On the keys, I add sonic layers to thicken our sound, without sticking out like a sore thumb. Anything from synths [to] organic patches and samples." She first appears with the band on "Absurd" and "Hard Skool", released in 2021.

== Discography ==
=== Solo ===
EP

- Lissa (2007) (featuring Brain and Pete Scaturro)
  - "Feel It" (2:49)
  - "Girlfriend" (2:25)
  - "Pretty Please" (2:43)
  - "Oooh La La" (2:35)
  - "Old Skool" (2:56) (featuring Mar Brooks)
  - "Remember the Times" (3:18) (feat. Mar Brooks and Buckethead)

Other appearances

- "Modnation Theme" – from ModNation Racers soundtrack (2010)

=== Other projects ===
Brain & Melissa

- PlayStation Home – "You and Me", "My World", "Forever" (2008)
- Don King Presents: Prizefighter – "Main Theme" (2008)
- MLB 2K11 – "MLB 2K Theme" (2011)
- Detention soundtrack (2011)
- Infamous 2 – "Infamous 2 Theme", "The Swamp", "Eroico Con Moto" (2011)
- Fear Not – "Fear Not 1&2" (2011)
- The Horror of Barnes Folly – "Main Theme" (2011)
- Twisted Metal – "Race 2 Destruction", "Ready to Die", "Twisted Metal Theme" (2012)
- Power/Rangers soundtrack (2015)
- Bloodborne – "Bloodborne", "The Night Unfurls", "Moonlit Melody" (2015)
- Infamous Second Son – "BadAss Combat", "Double Crossed", "Higher Elevation" (2015)

with Brain and Buckethead

- Best Regards (2010)
- Kind Regards (2010)
- Warm Regards (unreleased)

The Valence Project

- The Valence Project – "No Way", "Future People", "If We Get it – We Know We're Getting Good", "In This Life" (2010) (also featuring Brain)

Guns N' Roses

- "Absurd" (2021)
- "Hard Skool" (2021)

Other projects

- Eclectic Cinema – "Ride or Die", "Ooh La La", "Feel It", "Girlfriend", "Pretty Please", "Mother Nature", "Old Skool", "Remember the Times" (released 2013, also featuring Paul Tobias)

Session work

- The Assignment – "Tomboy" (Raney Shockne) (2017)
