= The General (Guns N' Roses song) =

2023 single by Guns N' Roses

Single by Guns N' Roses
- A-side: "Perhaps"
- Released: December 8, 2023
- Genre: Psychedelic rock; trip hop
- Length: 4:24
- Label: Geffen
- Songwriters: Axl Rose; Slash; Duff McKagan; Brain; Steve Freeman; Marc Haggard
- Producers: Axl Rose; Caram Costanzo

Guns N' Roses singles chronology
"Perhaps" (2023)	"The General" (2023)	"Nothin'" (2025)

Music video
- "The General" on YouTube

"The General" is a song by the American hard rock band Guns N' Roses. It was first released as an "R-side" to their single "Perhaps", and as a standalone single on December 8, 2023. Like the other singles released since the band's semi-reunion in 2016, it was conceived during the Chinese Democracy recording sessions from the late '90s to 2000s.

== Background ==
The title of the song came from drummer Brain, who named it so when the band was eating General Tso's chicken "but when [he] turned it in to Axl he thought it was called ‘The General’ because [he] was kind of making fun of Tommy [Stinson] as Tommy was, the band, you know, kind of like the MD [...] and he thought, like, you know, I was like poking fun at Tommy as being, like, you know, like a general... and I was like, ‘No, dude, it was because we ate general's chicken.’

"The General" was initially recorded during the sessions for Chinese Democracy. Parts of the orchestral arrangements in the song were played as an intro at the band's shows during the 2000s. The song features former Guns N' Roses members Brain and Chris Pitman as well as composer Marco Beltrami and guitarist Marc Haggard. Before the song was released, the band performed it live for the first time at the Hollywood Bowl on November 2, 2023. It was later released on streaming platforms on December 8, 2023, and a partially AI-generated music video for the track was released on January 24, 2024. Of the song, Sebastian Bach said:

"I was at a Christmas party at [Axl Rose]'s house last year and he played me all of Chinese Democracy - Four Albums - worth of material. The heaviest song is called The General. It’s so demonic and evil. I’ve never heard Axl sing as high as he does on that - except for maybe on my record."

Bach also said that Rose told him the song is a sequel to Use Your Illusion II's "Estranged", and so part of the group consisting of "November Rain", "Don't Cry" and "Estranged".

Slash said of his contributions to the song "Basically, the material was there, and I just got in there during covid and re-did the guitars, Duff did the bass, and we went from there and just put it out."

== Reception ==
Billboard described it as "bombastic". NME described it as "slow-burning [and] soaring". Louder Sound called it "epic" and described it as "a slow-burner" featuring "one of Axl Rose's more anguished vocals" Stereogum described the song as "Other than Axl Rose's instantly recognizable voice, 'The General' doesn't sound much like classic GNR. The verses match some spindly arpeggios and sitar that remind me of Abbey Road-era The Beatles with something like a trip-hop beat." Metal Injection described the track as having "Korn-esque clean/FX'ed guitars in the verse […] a big, angular chorus with a completely blown-out vocal track", calling it "out of the ordinary for Guns N' Roses".

While ranking all 84 Guns N' Roses songs from worst to best, Ultimate Classic Rock ranked "The General" second worst, at 83rd, whilst Loudwire placed it at 53 out of 68. Ultimate Classic Rock ranked the song 5th out of 6 post-reunion singles, saying "Rose's trip-hop affinity rears its head on "The General," a genre-hopping curio anchored around electronic beats and wah-drenched guitar licks. The frontman employs multiple vocal registers on the track, singing simultaneously in a baritone croon and pinched, nasally sneer. There aren't many conventional rock elements to be found, save for its doom-laden chorus, which is marred by heavy-handed vocal compression. In terms of composition and production, this song still feels stuck in demo form. Nothing particularly clicks here."

== Personnel ==
Credits per Apple Music

Guns N' Roses

- Axl Rose – vocals, production
- Richard Fortus – guitar
- Slash – guitar
- Duff McKagan – bass, backing vocals
- Dizzy Reed – keyboards
- Chris Pitman – keyboards
- Brain – drums

Additional credits

- Marc Haggard – guitar
- Marco Beltrami – strings, composition
- Caram Costanzo – keyboards, production, mixing engineer
- Eric Caudieux – additional engineering
