= Absurd (song) =

Single by Guns N' Roses
- Released: August 6, 2021
- Genre: Hard rock; alternative metal; punk rock; industrial rock; electronic rock
- Length: 3:23
- Label: Geffen; UMG
- Songwriters: Axl Rose; Dizzy Reed; Slash; Duff McKagan
- Producers: Axl Rose; Caram Costanzo

Guns N' Roses singles chronology
"Shadow of Your Love" (2018)	"Absurd" (2021)	"Hard Skool" (2021)

Music video
- "Absurd" on YouTube

"Absurd" (stylized as "ABSUЯD") is a song by the American hard rock band Guns N' Roses, released as a single on August 6, 2021. The song marks the group's first release of new material since the release of Chinese Democracy in 2008. It is also the first new track to feature guitarist Slash and bassist Duff McKagan since the 1994 release of "Sympathy for the Devil". Originally written during the Chinese Democracy sessions, "Absurd" was first performed live in 2001 as "Silkworms". The reworked version made its live debut on August 3, 2021, in Boston.

== Background ==
The song was initially written during the Chinese Democracy sessions as "Silkworms" by keyboardists Chris Pitman and Dizzy Reed. It was performed live four times in 2001. In 2008, Pitman talked about the song in an interview shortly before the release of Chinese Democracy, stating: "It ended up being this incredible track that sounded like Guns N' Roses 10 or 15 years in the future. It was so far removed from our other songs that we had to put it in this other place. Concept-wise, it didn't fit with Chinese Democracy. We hope we will have other songs that match that kind of futuristic sound. It's a really exciting track because it morphs into this crazy sound, but it was out so much in the other direction that we have to let time catch up with it. Following the release of Chinese Democracy, vocalist Axl Rose stated that the song had been reworked, now with "a lot of guitars, lots of different drum[s] [and] the chorus is gone". Two different studio recordings of the song leaked online in 2018 and 2019, respectively.

On August 3, 2021, the song was performed live in Boston during the We're F'N' Back! Tour. Axl Rose introduced it by stating: "Some of you might have heard this under another name, but this is really kind of absurd to try this. Wasn't that funny? And they don't even know the joke yet. Okay, this is called 'Absurd'." The officially released version of the song was produced by Axl Rose and Caram Costanzo, the latter whom also recorded and mixed the track. It also features former Guns N' Roses drummer Brain. An accompanying video was also made, animated by Creative Works. The song is officially credited as written by Rose, Reed, Slash and McKagan.

== Style ==
Alternative Nation compared the 2018 leaked version of the song to the works of Nine Inch Nails, Linkin Park, and The Prodigy, stating it has a "very late 90's/early 2000's electronica and industrial rhythm". Ultimate Classic Rock's Corey Irwin described the 2021 live version as "one of the hardest tracks in [Guns N' Roses'] arsenal" with "blistering drums and a frantic, punk rock pace", comparing Rose's vocals to Rage Against the Machine. Discussing the studio version, Irwin noted how the electronic influences found on "Silkworms" had given way to "heavy handed guitar solos and bombastic drums". Classic Rock's Stephen Hill described Rose's vocals on the song as "an amalgam of John Lydon and T.S.O.L.'s Jack Grisham", comparing them to "old school punk rock". Hill also noted similarities between the song's ambient interlude and the works of Sigur Rós. The song's opening riff was described by Hill as "an alt-metal stomper" in the vein of "Helmet or the Rollins Band, if those bands were trying to pay tribute to The Cult".

== Reception ==
Classic Rock's Stephen Hill gave "Absurd" a positive review, noting how the song makes the band "sound genuinely pumped up, aggressive and full of boisterous energy". While he noted that some listeners may be disappointed that the song doesn't sound like "classic" Guns N' Roses, he also remarked that "there really is no way that they - or indeed anyone else - is ever going to be able to top that legacy material". Upon release, Loudwire noted a divide among audiences, with some "digging the track" while others "don't seem so into it". Ultimate Classic Rock, in an article naming the song the "weirdest Guns N' Roses song", stated "'Absurd' is brash, distasteful and a laughably illogical choice as a comeback single from the semi-reunited GNR lineup. In other words, it's classic Guns N' Roses." Ultimate Classic Rock later named the song as the worst Guns N’ Roses song in a ranking of all 84 songs from worst to best, stating "Absurd" features all the pieces you'd want in a new GNR song - piercing wails from Axl Rose, grinding guitar from Slash and a thumping bassline from McKagan. Too bad it's all thrown together in a confusingly shapeless, grating jumble.”
