= Guns N' Roses discography =

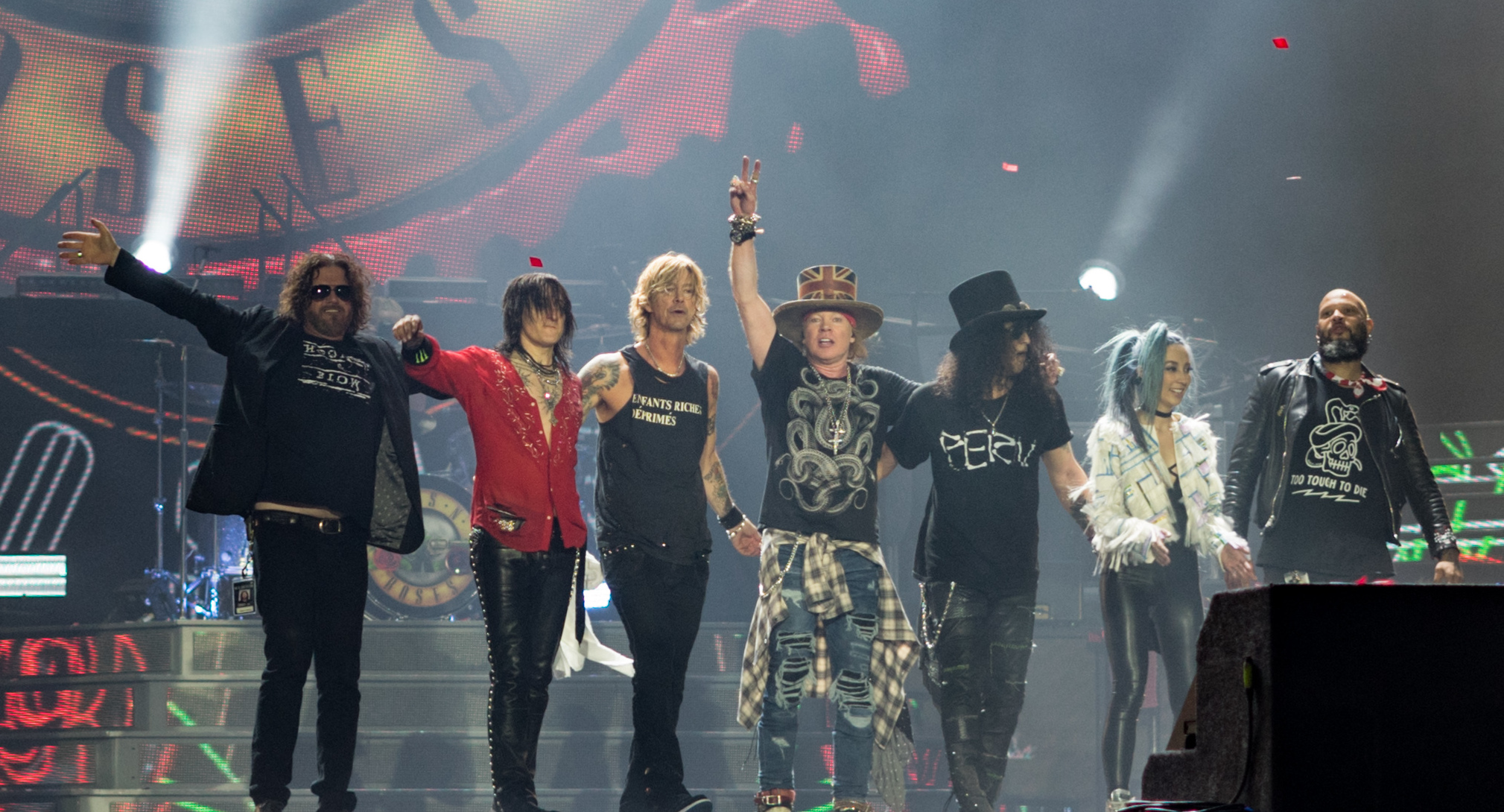
- Guns N' Roses in 2017
- Studio albums: 6
- Extended plays: 5
- Live albums: 1
- Compilation albums: 2
- Singles: 24
- Video albums: 10
- Music videos: 27

The discography of Guns N' Roses, an American hard rock band, consists of six studio albums, one live album, two compilation albums, five extended plays (EPs), 24 singles, ten video albums and 27 music videos. Guns N' Roses was formed in Los Angeles, California with an original recording lineup of lead vocalist Axl Rose, lead guitarist Slash, rhythm guitarist Izzy Stradlin, bassist Duff McKagan and drummer Steven Adler. After self-releasing the EP Live ?!*@ Like a Suicide in December 1986, the band signed with Geffen Records and released its debut studio album Appetite for Destruction the following July. It topped the US Billboard 200 and went on to become one of the best-selling albums of all time, with reported sales over 30 million units worldwide, 18 million of which are in the US. Three singles – "Welcome to the Jungle", "Sweet Child o' Mine" and "Paradise City" – reached the US Billboard Hot 100 top ten, with "Sweet Child o' Mine" topping the chart.

G N' R Lies followed in November 1988, comprising the four tracks from Live ?!*@ Like a Suicide and four new acoustic recordings. The album peaked at number 2 in the US and was certified six times platinum, while its lead single "Patience" reached number 4 on the singles chart. After adding keyboardist Dizzy Reed and replacing Adler with Matt Sorum, Guns N' Roses released Use Your Illusion I and Use Your Illusion II in September 1991. Upon their release, the albums occupied the top two positions on the US Billboard Top 200 Album chart. Use Your Illusion II reached number 1, which Axl Rose credited to fans knowing more of the songs from II due to live performances. "November Rain" was the most successful single from the albums domestically, reaching number 3 on the Hot 100.

During the Use Your Illusion Tour, Stradlin was replaced by Gilby Clarke. In 1992 the band released two live videos from the tour, Use Your Illusion World Tour: 1992 in Tokyo I and II, which both reached the top 20 of the Billboard Music Video Sales chart and were certified gold. On November 23 the following year saw the release of "The Spaghetti Incident?", an album of punk rock cover versions. The album garnered no US hit singles, but reached number 4 on the US album chart. Two singles – "Ain't It Fun" and "Since I Don't Have You" – reached the top ten of the UK Singles Chart. Clarke was replaced by Rose's friend Paul Tobias for a recording of "Sympathy for the Devil" for the Interview with the Vampire soundtrack in 1994, which charted at number 55 in the US and number 9 in the UK.

Guns N' Roses changed drastically in the mid-1990s, as Slash left in 1996, and Sorum and McKagan left in 1997. The band went through numerous lineup changes as it worked on its new album in 1997 with Rose, Reed, and Tobias the only remaining members from the previous lineup, and Rose himself the only member from the first album's release in 1987. The group's first live album Live Era '87–'93 was issued in 1999, and reached number 45 on the US Billboard Top 200 Album chart. In 2004, Geffen Records released a Greatest Hits album. It was a commercial success that topped the album charts in several countries, including the UK, and sold 5 million copies in the US. The band's sixth studio album Chinese Democracy was released in November 2008, after 10 years in the making and over $13 million in production costs. It reached number 3 on the US Billboard Top 200 Album chart, and sold roughly 2.5 million copies worldwide. Appetite for Democracy 3D, the first Guns N' Roses live video album since 1992, was released in 2014 and reached number 1 on the US Billboard Music Video Sales chart. Slash and McKagan rejoined the band in 2016, and in 2018, the band released a remastered box set of their debut album, titled the Appetite for Destruction: Locked N' Loaded edition.

Slash and McKagan's first recordings since rejoining the band, the singles "Absurd" & "Hard Skool", were released in 2021, the band's first new material released since 2008. On September 21, 2022, the band announced a remastered box set of the Use Your Illusion albums, featuring both albums remastered, two complete live performances, and a version of "November Rain" with re-recorded orchestration. The set was released on November 11, 2022.

== Albums ==
=== Studio albums ===
List of studio albums, with selected chart positions, sales figures and certifications
Title	Album details	Peak chart positions										Certifications
Title	Album details	US	AUS	AUT	CAN	GER	NLD	NOR	NZ	SWE	UK	Certifications
Appetite for Destruction	Released: July 21, 1987; Label: Geffen; Formats: CD, LP, CS	1	7	3	3	11	3	9	1	7	5	RIAA: 18× Platinum; ARIA: 7× Platinum; BPI: 9× Platinum; BVMI: Platinum; IFPI AUT: Platinum; IFPI SWE: Gold; MC: Diamond; NVPI: Platinum; RMNZ: 5× Platinum
G N' R Lies	Released: November 29, 1988; Label: Geffen; Formats: CD, LP, CS	2	18	10	16	37	12	6	5	15	22	RIAA: 5× Platinum; BPI: Gold; BVMI: Gold; IFPI AUT: Gold; RMNZ: Platinum
Use Your Illusion I	Released: September 17, 1991; Label: Geffen; Formats: CD, LP, CS	2	2	2	1	4	2	3	2	3	2	RIAA: 7× Platinum; ARIA: 4× Platinum; BPI: Platinum; BVMI: 2× Platinum; IFPI AUT: 2× Platinum; IFPI NOR: 2× Platinum; IFPI SWE: Platinum; MC: Diamond; NVPI: 2× Platinum; RMNZ: Platinum
Use Your Illusion II	Released: September 17, 1991; Label: Geffen; Formats: CD, LP, CS	1	1	1	1	2	2	2	1	2	1	RIAA: 7× Platinum; ARIA: 5× Platinum; BPI: Platinum; BVMI: 5× Gold; IFPI AUT: 2× Platinum; IFPI NOR: 2× Platinum; IFPI SWE: Platinum; MC: 9× Platinum; NVPI: Platinum; RMNZ: Platinum
"The Spaghetti Incident?"	Released: November 23, 1993; Label: Geffen; Formats: CD, LP, CS	4	1	4	3	5	4	2	3	3	2	RIAA: Platinum; ARIA: Platinum; BPI: Gold; BVMI: Gold; IFPI AUT: Gold; IFPI NOR: Platinum; IFPI SWE: Platinum; MC: 3× Platinum; NVPI: Platinum; RMNZ: Platinum
Chinese Democracy	Released: November 23, 2008; Label: Geffen, Black Frog; Formats: CD, LP, DL	3	3	3	1	2	4	2	1	1	2	RIAA: Platinum; ARIA: Platinum; BPI: Platinum; BVMI: Gold; IFPI SWE: Gold; RMNZ: Platinum

=== Live albums ===
List of live albums, with selected chart positions, sales figures and certifications
Title	Album details	Peak chart positions										Certifications
Title	Album details	US	AUT	CAN	FIN	NLD	NOR	NZ	SWE	SWI	UK	Certifications
Live Era '87–'93	Released: November 30, 1999; Label: Geffen; Formats: CD, LP, CS	45	29	25	29	16	17	32	49	31	45	RIAA: Gold; ARIA: Platinum; BPI: Gold; MC: Platinum

=== Compilation albums ===
List of compilation albums, with selected chart positions, sales figures and certifications
Title	Album details	Peak chart positions										Sales	Certifications
Title	Album details	US	AUS	AUT	CAN	FIN	NOR	NZ	SWE	SWI	UK	Sales	Certifications
Use Your Illusion	Released: August 25, 1998; Label: Geffen; Formats: CD, LP, CS	—	—	—	—	—	—	—	—	—	—		
Greatest Hits	Released: March 23, 2004; Label: Geffen; Formats: CD, LP, CS	3	5	1	2	1	1	1	2	2	1	US: 6,002,000	RIAA: 5× Platinum; ARIA: 9× Platinum; BPI: 8× Platinum; IFPI AUT: Gold; IFPI FIN: Platinum; IFPI SWE: Platinum; IFPI SWI: Platinum; MC: 4× Platinum; RMNZ: 6× Platinum
"—" denotes a release that did not register on that chart or was not issued in that region.

== Extended plays ==
=== Studio EPs ===
List of studio extended plays
Title	EP details
Live ?!*@ Like a Suicide	Released: December 16, 1986; Label: Uzi Suicide; Format: 12" vinyl, CS

=== Compilation EPs ===
List of compilation extended plays
Title	EP details
Guns N' Roses (aka. Live from the Jungle)	Released: 1988; Label: Geffen; Formats: 12" vinyl, CC, CD
The "Civil War" EP	Released: May 24, 1993; Label: Geffen; Format: CD
Hard Skool	Released: February 25, 2022; Label: Geffen; Format: CC, CD, 7" vinyl
London 1991	Released: March 29, 2023; Label: Geffen; Format: CD

== Box sets ==
List of box sets
Title	Box set details
Appetite for Destruction Locked N' Loaded Edition	Released: June 29, 2018; Label: UMG
Use Your Illusion Super Deluxe Edition	Released: November 11, 2022; Label: UMG

== Singles ==
=== 1980s ===
List of singles, with selected chart positions and certifications, showing year released and album name
Title	Year	Peak chart positions										Certifications	Album
Title	Year	US	AUS	CAN	IRL	NLD	NOR	NZ	SWE	SWI	UK	Certifications	Album
"It's So Easy" / "Mr. Brownstone"	1987	—	—	—	—	—	—	—	—	—	84	RMNZ: Gold	Appetite for Destruction
"Welcome to the Jungle"	1987	7	41	—	14	84	—	6	—	—	24	RIAA: Gold; BPI: 2× Platinum; RMNZ: 4× Platinum	Appetite for Destruction
"Sweet Child o' Mine"	1988	1	11	7	4	20	—	5	27	15	6	RIAA: Platinum; ARIA: 8× Platinum; BPI: 6× Platinum; RMNZ: 9× Platinum	Appetite for Destruction
"Paradise City"	1989	5	48	10	1	2	4	2	3	7	6	BPI: 3× Platinum; RMNZ: 5× Platinum	Appetite for Destruction
"Patience"	1989	4	16	—	2	3	—	4	—	16	10	RIAA: Gold; ARIA: Gold; BPI: Silver; RMNZ: Platinum	G N' R Lies
"Nightrain"	1989	93	61	—	2	—	—	21	—	—	17	BPI: Silver; RMNZ: Gold	Appetite for Destruction
"—" denotes a release that did not register on that chart or was not issued in that region.

=== 1990s ===
List of singles, with selected chart positions and certifications, showing year released and album name
Title	Year	Peak chart positions										Certifications	Album
Title	Year	US	AUS	CAN	IRL	NLD	NOR	NZ	SWE	SWI	UK	Certifications	Album
"Knockin' on Heaven's Door"	1990	—	—	56	—	—	—	—	—	—	—	BPI: Platinum; RMNZ: 3× Platinum	Days of Thunder (soundtrack) (later featured on Use Your Illusion II)
"You Could Be Mine"	1991	29	3	30	2	4	2	2	2	2	3	RIAA: Gold; ARIA: Platinum; BPI: Silver; RMNZ: Platinum	Use Your Illusion II
"Don't Cry"	1991	10	5	11	1	7	2	2	9	3	8	RIAA: Gold; ARIA: Gold; BPI: Silver; RMNZ: Platinum	Use Your Illusion I
"Live and Let Die"	1991	33	10	56	5	13	3	1	15	19	5	ARIA: Gold; BPI: Gold; RMNZ: Platinum	Use Your Illusion I
"November Rain"	1992	3	5	5	3	3	7	7	38	8	4	RIAA: Gold; ARIA: 4× Platinum; BPI: 2× Platinum; NVPI: Gold; RMNZ: 4× Platinum	Use Your Illusion I
"Knockin' on Heaven's Door"	1992	—	12	—	1	1	6	2	10	5	2	ARIA: Gold; BPI: Gold; NVPI: Platinum	Use Your Illusion II
"Yesterdays"	1992	72	14	52	5	7	5	7	16	19	8		Use Your Illusion II
"Civil War"	1993	—	45	—	15	16	10	27	—	—	11	ARIA: Gold; BPI: Silver; RMNZ: Platinum	Use Your Illusion II
"Ain't It Fun"	1993	—	—	—	14	22	3	36	5	15	9		"The Spaghetti Incident?"
"Estranged"	1994	—	40	—	—	—	—	28	26	41	—	RMNZ: Gold	Use Your Illusion II
"Since I Don't Have You"	1994	69	47	20	16	—	—	48	40	—	10		"The Spaghetti Incident?"
"Sympathy for the Devil"	1994	55	12	48	5	9	5	13	7	15	9		Interview with the Vampire
"—" denotes a release that did not register on that chart or was not issued in that region.

=== 2000s ===
List of singles, with selected chart positions and certifications, showing year released and album name
Title	Year	Peak chart positions										Album
Title	Year	US	US Main	AUS	CAN	NLD	NOR	NZ	SWE	SWI	UK	Album
"Chinese Democracy"	2008	34	5	54	10	15	1	27	3	11	27	Chinese Democracy

=== 2010s ===
List of singles, with selected chart positions and certifications, showing year released and album name
Title	Year	Peak chart positions			Album
Title	Year	US Airplay	US Hard Rock Digi.	US Main	Album
"Shadow of Your Love"	2018	18	11	5	Appetite for Destruction: Locked N' Loaded Edition

=== 2020s ===
List of singles, with selected chart positions and certifications, showing year released and album name
Title	Year	Peak chart positions						Album
Title	Year	US Airplay	US Hard Rock Digi.	US Hard Rock	US Main	US Rock Digi.	NZ Hot	Album
"Absurd"	2021	—	2	5	—	6	—	Hard Skool EP
"Hard Skool"	2021	20	1	2	9	4	28	Hard Skool EP
"Perhaps"	2023	24	1	8	12	3	40	Non-album singles
"The General"	2023	—	3	10	—	7	—	Non-album singles
"Nothin'"	2025	18	2	15	7	9	—	Non-album singles
"Atlas"	2025	—	4	—	—	12	—	Non-album singles
"—" denotes a release that did not register on that chart or was not issued in that region.

=== Promotional singles ===
List of singles, with selected chart positions and certifications, showing year released and album name
Title	Year	Peak chart positions				Album
Title	Year	US Hard Rock Digi.	US Main	CAN Act.	CAN Rock	Album
"Welcome to the Jungle" (US only)	1987	—	—	—	—	Appetite for Destruction
"It's So Easy" (Spain only)	1990	—	—	—	—	Appetite for Destruction
"Knockin' on Heaven's Door" (Days of Thunder version)	1990	—	—	—	—	Days of Thunder Soundtrack
"14 Years"	1991	—	—	—	—	Use Your Illusion II
"Pretty Tied Up (The Perils of Rock n Roll Decadence)"	1992	—	35	—	—	Use Your Illusion II
"So Fine"	1992	—	—	—	—	Use Your Illusion II
"Garden of Eden"	1992	—	—	—	—	Use Your Illusion I
"Dead Horse"	1993	—	—	—	—	Use Your Illusion I
"Hair of the Dog"	1993	—	11	—	—	This Spaghetti Incident?
"New Rose"	1993	—	—	—	—	This Spaghetti Incident?
"Oh My God"	1999	—	26	—	—	Music From and Inspired by the Motion Picture End of Days
"Better"	2008	—	18	15	37	Chinese Democracy
"Street of Dreams"	2009	—	—	44	—	Chinese Democracy
"Welcome to the Jungle" (1986 Sound City Session)	2018	—	—	—	—	Appetite for Destruction: Locked N' Loaded Edition
"Move to the City" (1988 acoustic version)	2018	—	—	—	—	Appetite for Destruction: Locked N' Loaded Edition
"November Rain" (piano version / 1986 Sound City session)	2018	—	—	—	—	Appetite for Destruction: Locked N' Loaded Edition
"You Could Be Mine" (live in New York, Ritz Theatre – May 16, 1991)	2022	—	—	—	—	Use Your Illusion (Super Deluxe)
"Double Talkin' Jive" (live in Las Vegas, Thomas & Mack Center – January 25, 1992)	2022	—	—	—	—	Use Your Illusion (Super Deluxe)
"November Rain" (2022 version)	2022	15	—	—	—	Use Your Illusion (Super Deluxe)

=== Other charted songs ===
- "I.R.S." (leaked demo) – #49, Radio & Records Active Rock National Airplay (US) for week ending February 24, 2006.

== Videos ==
=== Video albums ===
List of video albums, with selected chart positions and certifications
Title	Album details	Peak chart positions										Certifications
Title	Album details	US	AUS	BEL (FL)	BEL (WA)	FIN	GER	JPN	NLD	SPA	UK	Certifications
Use Your Illusion I: World Tour – 1992 in Tokyo	Released: December 8, 1992; Label: Geffen; Formats: VHS, DVD, LD	11	—	—	—	1	—	—	28	—	3	RIAA: Gold; ARIA: Platinum; BPI: Platinum
Use Your Illusion II: World Tour – 1992 in Tokyo	Released: December 8, 1992; Label: Geffen; Formats: VHS, DVD, LD	15	—	—	—	2	—	—	—	—	6	RIAA: Gold; ARIA: Platinum; BPI: Platinum
Use Your Illusion I & II: World Tour – 1992 in Tokyo	Released: December 8, 1992; Label: Geffen; Formats: VHS, LD	3	—	—	—	—	—	—	—	—	—	
Garden of Eden: Strictly Limited Edition Video Single	Released: May 24. 1993; Label: Geffen; Formats: VHS	—	—	—	—	—	—	—	—	—	—	
Don't Cry: Makin' F@*!ing Videos Part I	Released: June 1993; Label: Geffen; Formats: VHS, LD	—	—	—	—	—	—	—	—	—	—	
November Rain: Makin' F@*!ing Videos Part II	Released: June 1993; Label: Geffen; Formats: VHS, LD	—	—	—	—	—	—	—	—	—	—	
Makin' F@*!ing Videos Part I & II	Released: June 1993; Label: Geffen; Formats: VHS, LD	—	—	—	—	—	—	—	—	—	—	
The Making of Estranged: Part IV of the Trilogy!!!	Released: April 1994; Label: Geffen; Formats: VHS, LD	—	—	—	—	—	—	—	—	—	—	
Welcome to the Videos	Released: October 27, 1998; Label: Geffen; Formats: VHS, DVD, VCD	5	37	—	—	2	—	92	—	—	11	RIAA: 2× Platinum; ARIA: 7× Platinum
Appetite for Democracy 3D	Released: July 1, 2014; Label: Geffen, Black Frog; Format: DVD, BD	1	—	191	79	44	57	112	4	93	—	
"—" denotes a release that did not register on that chart or was not issued in that region.

=== Music videos ===
List of music videos, showing year released, director(s) and album name
Title	(Appearance) Year	Director(s)	Album	Ref.
"Welcome to the Jungle"	1987	Nigel Dick	Appetite for Destruction	
"Sweet Child o' Mine"	1988	Nigel Dick	Appetite for Destruction	
"Paradise City"	1988	Nigel Dick	Appetite for Destruction	
"Patience"	1989	Nigel Dick	G N' R Lies	
"Knockin' on Heaven's Door" (Days of Thunder version)	1990		Days of Thunder Soundtrack	
"You Could Be Mine" (Terminator 2 version)	1991	Jeffrey Abelson; Andy Morahan; Stan Winston	Use Your Illusion II	
"Don't Cry"	1991	Andy Morahan	Use Your Illusion I	
"Live and Let Die"	1991	Josh Richman	Use Your Illusion I	
"Knockin' on Heaven's Door" (live)	1992	Live at Wembley Stadium, London, UK; The Freddie Mercury Tribute Concert; April 20, 1992	Use Your Illusion II	
"November Rain"	1992	Andy Morahan	Use Your Illusion I	
"Yesterdays" (2 versions, normal & with pictures)	1992	Andy Morahan	Use Your Illusion II	
"Garden of Eden" (2 versions, normal & with pappers)	1992	Andy Morahan	Use Your Illusion I	
"Dead Horse"	1993	Guns N' Roses; Louis Marciano	Use Your Illusion I	
"The Garden"	1993	Del James	Use Your Illusion I	
"Estranged"	1993	Andy Morahan	Use Your Illusion II	
"Since I Don't Have You"	1994	Sante D'Orazio	"The Spaghetti Incident?"	
"It's So Easy" (live)	1999	Jeff Richter	Live Era '87–'93	
"Welcome to the Jungle" (live)	1999	Jeff Richter	Live Era '87–'93	
"Sweet Child o' Mine" (Black & White version from 1988)	2004	Nigel Dick	Greatest Hits	
"Bad Apples"(Footage from "Don't Cry" video 1991)	2009	Andy Morahan	Use Your Illusion I	
"Shadow of Your Love" (1986, 2 versions, Lyric & Tour Edition NITL Tour 2017-2018)	2018	Guns N' Roses team	Appetite for Destruction Super Deluxe Edition	
"Move to the City" (1988 acoustic version, lyric video with pictures from NITL Tour 2017-2018)	2018	Guns N' Roses team	Appetite for Destruction Super Deluxe Edition	
"It's So Easy" (new edit of the 1989 version)	2018	Nigel Dick	Appetite for Destruction	
"Hard Skool" (lyric video with pictures from the 2021 tour)	2021	Guns N' Roses team	Hard Skool EP	
"You Could Be Mine" (new edit of Live in New York, Ritz Theatre - May 16, 1991)	2022		Use Your Illusion Super Deluxe Edition	
"Perhaps"	2023		"Perhaps"	
"The General"	2024	Daniel G. Potter	"The General"	
Unreleased music videos
"It's So Easy" (original 1989 version)	1989	Nigel Dick	Appetite for Destruction	
"Mr. Brownstone"	1991	Mark Racco	Appetite for Destruction	
"My Michelle"	1991	Mark Racco	Appetite for Destruction	
"You Could Be Mine" (director's cut 1991 version)	1991	Mark Racco	Use Your Illusion II	
"Don't Cry" (alt. lyrics)	1991	Andy Morahan	Use Your Illusion II	
"I Don't Care About You"	1994	August Jakobsson	"The Spaghetti Incident?"	
"Better"	2009	Dale Resteghini	Chinese Democracy	
