= Use Your Illusion =

1998 compilation album by Guns N' Roses

Compilation album by Guns N' Roses
- Released: August 25, 1998
- Recorded: January 1990 – August 1991
- Studio: A&M (Hollywood); Record Plant (Los Angeles); Studio 56 (Los Angeles); Image Recording (Hollywood); Conway (Los Angeles); Metalworks (Mississauga, Ontario)
- Genre: Hard rock
- Length: 63:50
- Label: Geffen
- Producer: Guns N' Roses; Mike Clink

Guns N' Roses chronology
"The Spaghetti Incident?" (1993)	Use Your Illusion (1998)	Welcome to the Videos (1998)

Use Your Illusion is the name of two releases by American rock band Guns N' Roses: a 1998 compilation album, drawing from the Use Your Illusion I and II studio albums featuring songs without explicit lyrics; and a 2022 box set anniversary edition of both albums.

The first compilation was only released in the United States, and was primarily sold at Walmart and Kmart, two retail outlets that refused to stock the unedited Use Your Illusion I and II due to explicit lyrics. The second compilation featured remastered versions of both albums alongside several live shows in honor of the album's 30th anniversary.

== Overview ==
"Knockin' on Heaven's Door" appears in an edited version without Josh Richman's speech, removed for unknown reasons. Therefore, the track length is reduced to 5:20, instead of 5:36 from the version included on Use Your Illusion II. Richman's speech was instead included in the Greatest Hits compilation album.

The cover art of the album simply combines the color schemes from the covers of Use Your Illusion I and Use Your Illusion II, which were originally designed by Mark Kostabi. Like the original two, the image is a detail of the Raphael painting The School of Athens.

== Track listing ==
1. "Live and Let Die" (Paul McCartney, Linda McCartney) – 3:04
2. "Don't Cry (Original)" (Axl Rose, Izzy Stradlin) – 4:44
3. "You Ain't the First" (Stradlin) – 2:36
4. "November Rain" (Rose) – 8:57
5. "The Garden" (Rose, West Arkeen, Del James) – 5:22
6. "Dead Horse" (Rose) – 4:17
7. "Civil War" (Rose, Slash, Duff McKagan) – 7:42
8. "14 Years" (Rose, Stradlin) – 4:21
9. "Yesterdays" (Rose, Arkeen, James, Billy McCloud) – 3:16
10. "Knockin' on Heaven's Door" (Bob Dylan) – 5:20
11. "Estranged" (Rose) – 9:23
12. "Don't Cry (Alternate Lyrics)" (Rose, Stradlin) – 4:43

== Personnel ==
=== Guns N' Roses ===
- W. Axl Rose – lead vocals, piano, choir, and synthesizer programming on "November Rain", acoustic guitar on "Dead Horse", backing vocals on "You Ain't the First" and "14 Years"
- Slash – lead guitar, acoustic and slide guitar on "The Garden", dobro on "You Ain't the First", acoustic guitar on "Civil War"
- Izzy Stradlin – rhythm guitar, backing vocals, acoustic guitar on "You Ain't the First", lead vocals on "You Ain't the First" and "14 Years"
- Duff McKagan – bass guitar, backing vocals, acoustic guitar on "You Ain't the First", percussion
- Matt Sorum – drums, backing vocals, choir on "November Rain"
- Dizzy Reed – keyboards, piano, organ on "Yesterdays", backing vocals

=== Additional personnel ===
- Steven Adler – drums on "Civil War"
- Shannon Hoon – backing vocals on tracks 1, 2, 4, 5 & 12
- Alice Cooper – lead vocals on "The Garden"
- Johann Langlie – programming on "November Rain", "Live and Let Die"
- Reba Shaw, Stuart Bailey – backing vocals on "November Rain"
- Jon Thautwein, Matthew McKagan, Rachel West, Robert Clark – horn on "Live and Let Die"
- West Arkeen – acoustic guitar on "The Garden"
- Mike Clink – nutcracker on "Dead Horse"
- The Waters – backing vocals on "Knockin' on Heaven's Door"
- Tim Doyle – tambourine on "You Ain't the First"

== Remastered box set ==
Use Your Illusion (Super Deluxe)

Box set by Guns N' Roses
- Released: November 11, 2022
- Recorded: January 13, 1990 – January 25, 1992
- Studio: A&M Studios; Record Plant Studios; Studio 56; Image Recording; Conway Studios; Metalworks Recording Studio
- Genre: Hard rock
- Label: Geffen

Guns N' Roses chronology
Hard Skool (2022)	Use Your Illusion (Super Deluxe) (2022)

Per the Guns N' Roses website, the Use Your Illusion (Super Deluxe) has 7 CD's and 1 Blu-ray with the following:

CD 1

Use Your Illusion I - Original Album Remastered

1. Right Next Door to Hell
2. Dust N' Bones
3. Live and Let Die
4. Don't Cry (Original)
5. Perfect Crime
6. You Ain't the First
7. Bad Obsession
8. Back Off Bitch
9. Double Talkin' Jive
10. November Rain* (2022 Version)
11. The Garden
12. Garden of Eden
13. Don't Damn Me
14. Bad Apples
15. Dead Horse
16. Coma

CD 2

Use Your Illusion II - Original Album Remastered

1. Civil War
2. 14 Years
3. Yesterdays
4. Knockin' on Heaven's Door
5. Get in the Ring
6. Shotgun Blues
7. Breakdown
8. Pretty Tied Up
9. Locomotive
10. So Fine
11. Estranged
12. You Could Be Mine
13. Don't Cry (Alt. Lyrics)
14. My World

CD 3

Live in New York, Ritz Theatre – May 16, 1991

1. Pretty Tied Up*
2. Bad Obsession*
3. Right Next Door to Hell*
4. Mr. Brownstone*
5. Dust N' Bones
6. Live and Let Die*
7. Paradise City*
8. Voodoo Child (Slight Return) / Civil War*
9. Drum Solo*
10. Slash Solo*
11. You Could Be Mine*

CD 4

Live in New York, Ritz Theatre – May 16, 1991

1. I Was Only Joking / Patience*
2. Only Women Bleed / Knockin' on Heaven's Door*
3. Don't Cry (Original)* [features Shannon Hoon On Vocals]
4. You Ain't the First* [features Shannon Hoon On Vocals]
5. My Michelle*
6. Estranged*
7. Double Talkin' Jive*
8. Sweet Child o' Mine*
9. Welcome to the Jungle*

CD 5

Live in Las Vegas, Thomas & Mack Center – January 25, 1992

1. Nightrain
2. Mr. Brownstone*
3. Live and Let Die*
4. Attitude*
5. It's So Easy*
6. Bad Obsession*
7. Welcome to the Jungle*
8. Double Talkin' Jive*
9. Voodoo Child (Slight Return) / Civil War / Voodoo Child (Slight Return)*

CD 6

Live in Las Vegas, Thomas & Mack Center – January 25, 1992

1. Don't Cry (Original)*
2. Wild Horses*
3. Patience*
4. You Could Be Mine*
5. So Fine*
6. November Rain*
7. Band Intros / Drum Solo*
8. Slash Solo*
9. Speak Softly, Love (Love Theme from The Godfather)*
10. Rocket Queen

CD 7

Live in Las Vegas, Thomas & Mack Center – January 25, 1992

1. Sail Away Sweet Sister*
2. Sweet Child o' Mine*
3. Move to the City*
4. Hotel California / Only Women Bleed / Knockin' on Heaven's Door*
5. Yesterdays
6. My Michelle*
7. Estranged*
8. Mother / Paradise City*
9. Live and Let Die (Live in Tokyo) #
10. Don't Cry (Original) (Live in Tokyo) #
11. Voodoo Child (Slight Return) / Civil War / Voodoo Child (Slight Return) (Live in Tokyo) #
12. You Could Be Mine (Live in Tokyo) #

Blu-Ray Video

Live in New York, Ritz Theatre – May 16, 1991

Concert: 1.44:1 Pillarbox / 1080p / 24fps

Audio: Dolby Atmos 48 kHz 24-bit / Dolby TrueHD 5.1 96 kHz 24-bit / PCM Stereo 48 kHz 24-bit

Regions: All

Run Time: 2hr 6min

1. Pretty Tied Up*
2. Bad Obsession*
3. Right Next Door to Hell*
4. Mr. Brownstone*
5. Dust N' Bones*
6. Live and Let Die*
7. Paradise City*
8. Voodoo Child (Slight Return) / Civil War*
9. Drum Solo*
10. Slash Solo*
11. You Could Be Mine*
12. I Was Only Joking / Patience*
13. Only Women Bleed / Knockin' on Heaven's Door*
14. Don't Cry (Original)* [feat. Shannon Hoon on Vocals]
15. You Ain't the First* [feat. Shannon Hoon on Vocals]
16. My Michelle*
17. Estranged*
18. Double Talkin' Jive*
19. Sweet Child o' Mine*
20. Welcome to the Jungle*

* Previously unreleased

# Special Bonus Tracks for Japan

== Certifications ==
Certifications for "Use Your Illusion (Super Deluxe)"
Region	Certification	Certified units/sales
Brazil (Pro-Música Brasil)	Diamond	160,000^{‡}
^{‡} Sales+streaming figures based on certification alone.
