= Guns N' Roses/Metallica Stadium Tour =

1992 concert tour by Guns N' Roses and Metallica

- Tour by Guns N' Roses and Metallica
- A poster for the concert on August 12, 1992 in Denver, Colorado, which was postponed due to James Hetfield's injuries in Montreal
- Associated album: Use Your Illusion I; Use Your Illusion II; Metallica; Angel Dust
- Start date: July 17, 1992
- End date: October 6, 1992
- No. of shows: 26
Guns N' Roses tour chronology
Use Your Illusion Tour (1991–1992)	Guns N' Roses/Metallica Stadium Tour (1992)	Use Your Illusion Tour (1992–1993)
Metallica tour chronology
Wherever We May Roam Tour (1991–1992)	Guns N' Roses/Metallica Stadium Tour (1992)	Nowhere Else to Roam (1993)

The Guns N' Roses/Metallica Stadium Tour was a co-headlining concert tour by the American rock bands Guns N' Roses and Metallica during 1992. It took place in the middle of Guns N' Roses' Use Your Illusion Tour, promoting their Use Your Illusion I and II albums, and between Metallica's Wherever We May Roam Tour and Nowhere Else to Roam, promoting their eponymous fifth album Metallica. The tour's initial opening act was Faith No More as Axl Rose had originally wanted Seattle rock band Nirvana to be the opening act, but frontman Kurt Cobain refused.

== History ==
"When you have to get Guns N' Roses and Metallica on the same tour to sell tickets, it shows everyone that you have to put real big packaging together to make a difference."

— Ronnie James Dio, on WERS' Nasty Habits show

On May 12, 1992, Metallica's drummer, Lars Ulrich, and Guns N' Roses' lead guitarist, Slash, held a press conference at the Gaslight in Los Angeles, California, announcing that both Metallica and Guns N' Roses would tour together that summer, beginning in Washington, D.C., at RFK Stadium on July 17, 1992. Footage of Metallica's opening song "Creeping Death" was later recorded for their documentary A Year and a Half in the Life of Metallica.

On July 22, 1992, at the Hoosier Dome in Indianapolis, Indiana; Blind Melon's lead vocalist, Shannon Hoon, joined Guns N' Roses onstage for the original version of their song "Don't Cry".

Following James Hetfield's injuries stemming from his burns during their ill-fated performance in Montreal, the tour resumed in Avondale, Arizona, at the Phoenix International Raceway on August 25, 1992, with Hetfield wearing a thick elbow-to-finger bandage and unable to play guitar until his arm was fully healed. Former Metallica roadie, former Metallica guitar tech, and Metal Church guitarist John Marshall filled in for the rest of the tour on rhythm guitar, while Hetfield continued to sing. Metallica's performance of "Nothing Else Matters" was recorded for their documentary A Year and a Half in the Life of Metallica.

Faith No More lead guitarist Jim Martin joined Metallica onstage for their cover of the Misfits song "Last Caress" on September 5, 1992, at Texas Stadium in Irving, Texas.

Body Count was hired to open the tour on September 22, 1992 after Faith No More was fired from the bill the day prior. Body Count performed their first concert as the opening act in Kansas City, Missouri, at Arrowhead Stadium on September 17, 1992, and continued opening for the rest of the tour, along with Motörhead on the last three dates of the tour. Motörhead opened for the show at the Los Angeles Coliseum in Los Angeles, California, on September 27, 1992, as Body Count was dropped from the bill for the Coliseum show.

Comedian Andrew Dice Clay introduced Guns N' Roses before they came onstage on October 3, 1992 at the Rose Bowl Stadium in Pasadena, California.

The tour was financially successful for Metallica, but Guns N' Roses did not profit as much. According to Slash, in his self-titled autobiography, the band lost about 80% of their earnings primarily due to Rose's extravagant spending, which included funding expensive backstage theme parties at every show, as well as the band being fined heavily for multiple late appearances. The tour also earned both bands a Metal Edge Readers' Choice Award in 1992, when it was voted "Best Concert Tour".

=== Incidents ===
- On July 21, 1992, when Guns N' Roses was performing at the Pontiac Silverdome in Pontiac, Michigan; the band had finished performing their song "You Could Be Mine", when Axl Rose vomited onstage and left soon afterwards. The band continued in his absence with Duff on vocals covering a few older punk songs. Axl returned to the stage about 30 minutes later and apologized to the audience for the poor performance. He wanted to do right by the fans and because he felt that their performance of the song wasn't up to par, the band performed the song again.
- On July 29, 1992, while Guns N' Roses was performing during the second show at Giants Stadium in East Rutherford, New Jersey, frontman Axl Rose encountered severe pain in his throat, but continued the show until he was hit in the genitals by a cigarette lighter thrown from the audience during "Knockin' on Heaven's Door", forcing him to retreat backstage to recover, while bassist Duff McKagan took over on vocals as the set would be cut short soon afterwards.
- On July 30, 1992, while on a rest day in New York City, Rose was diagnosed with severe damage to his vocal chords, and was told by doctors that he could not sing for at least a week, resulting in three shows of the tour being rescheduled.
- On September 21, 1992, Faith No More was fired from the tour due in large part to the band's dissatisfaction with Guns N' Roses' management and singer Mike Patton's obscene retaliatory behavior in which he allegedly urinated on Axl Rose's teleprompter.

==== Montreal Riot ====
On August 8, 1992, during the performance at Montreal's Olympic Stadium; halfway into Metallica's set, during the song "Fade to Black", frontman and rhythm guitarist James Hetfield accidentally stepped into a 3,200°F magnesium flash due to a miscommunication with the pyrotechnics director, forcing the band to cut their set short as Hetfield was rushed to the hospital. After Hetfield was taken to the hospital, lead guitarist Kirk Hammett, bassist Jason Newsted and drummer Lars Ulrich took the stage and told the crowd the band could not continue the show. After a lengthy delay, the audience became increasingly impatient as Guns N' Roses eventually took the stage after a two hour and fifteen minute wait. However, the shortened time between sets did not allow for adequate tuning of the band's stage monitors, resulting in multiple band members noticing audial issues. Singer Axl Rose later blamed the issues on bad audio and vocal problems stemming from his diagnosis on July 30. Rose forced the band to end their set short after performing only nine songs, then proclaiming to the crowd "Thank you, your money will be refunded, we're out of here!" before throwing his microphone and storming offstage. Following the set, the screens on the sides of the stage flashed the message "The show is over, please check the media for more news.", which led to an estimated crowd of 2,000 people to start rioting within the stadium and surrounding areas, the fans would overturn police cars, loot various souvenir booths, and set multiple bonfires within the stadium causing an estimated $600,000 in damage to the stadium and surrounding areas. Footage from the incident was later included in Metallica's 1992 documentary A Year and a Half in the Life of Metallica. According to multiple reports from Metallica's road crew, guitarist Kirk Hammett and bassist Jason Newsted, Rose and the band showed little remorse for the incident following the mayhem, and was even reported by Hammett to have returned to his dressing room drinking with other band members while the bands were forced to remain inside the Expos' locker rooms during the destruction. Inside the locker rooms, Newsted stated that Rose was smoking and drinking while complaining about his voice.

Six shows were forced to be rescheduled due to Hetfield's injuries, including a cancelled performance in Vancouver at BC Place for August 17.

On August 27, 1992 during a performance of U2's Zoo TV Tour, frontman Bono jokingly imitated Rose regarding the incident to the crowd, asking fans "Oh hey, what time is it? Looks like we gotta go!".

Metallica would later perform two half-priced shows at the Montreal Forum in February 1993. The Régie des Installations Olympiques banned Guns N' Roses for life from the venue.

On August 11 and 13, 2023, as part of their M72 World Tour playing two shows for every city, Metallica returned to the Olympic Stadium for the first time since the events.

== Guns N' Roses setlists ==
=== First setlist ===
(Taken from the Orchard Park, New York, Rich Stadium show on July 25, 1992)

1. "Nightrain"
2. "Mr. Brownstone"
3. "Live and Let Die" (Paul McCartney and Wings cover)
4. "Attitude" (Misfits cover)
5. "Bad Obsession"
6. "Double Talkin' Jive"
7. "Civil War"
8. "Wild Horses" (The Rolling Stones cover)
9. "Patience"
10. "It's So Easy"
11. "Welcome to the Jungle"
12. "You Could Be Mine"
13. "It's Alright" (Black Sabbath cover)
14. "November Rain"
15. "Sweet Child o' Mine"
16. "Knockin' on Heaven's Door" (Bob Dylan cover)
17. "Don't Cry (Original)"
18. "Paradise City"

=== Second setlist ===
(Taken from the Pittsburgh, Pennsylvania, Three Rivers Stadium show on July 26, 1992)

1. "It's So Easy"
2. "Nightrain"
3. "Mr. Brownstone"
4. "Live and Let Die" (Paul McCartney and Wings cover)
5. "Attitude" (Misfits cover)
6. "Bad Obsession"
7. "Double Talkin' Jive"
8. "Civil War"
9. "Move to the City"
10. "Wild Horses" (The Rolling Stones cover)
11. "Patience"
12. "Welcome to the Jungle"
13. "You Could Be Mine"
14. "November Rain"
15. "Sweet Child o' Mine"
16. "Knockin' on Heaven's Door" (Bob Dylan cover)
17. "Don't Cry (Original)"
18. "Paradise City"

=== Third setlist ===
(Taken from the Houston, Texas, Astrodome show on September 4, 1992)

1. "Welcome to the Jungle"
2. "Mr. Brownstone"
3. "Live and Let Die" (Paul McCartney and Wings cover)
4. "Attitude" (Misfits cover)
5. "Nightrain"
6. "Bad Obsession"
7. "It's So Easy"
8. "Wild Horses" (The Rolling Stones cover)
9. "Patience"
10. "Double Talkin' Jive"
11. "Civil War"
12. "It's Alright" (Black Sabbath cover)
13. "November Rain"
14. "You Could Be Mine"
15. "Sweet Child o' Mine"
16. "Knockin' on Heaven's Door" (Bob Dylan cover)
17. "Don't Cry (Original)"
18. "Paradise City"

=== Fourth setlist ===
(Taken from the Columbia, South Carolina, Williams-Brice Stadium show on September 7, 1992)

1. "Welcome to the Jungle"
2. "Mr. Brownstone"
3. "Live and Let Die" (Paul McCartney and Wings cover)
4. "Attitude" (Misfits cover)
5. "It's So Easy"
6. "Bad Obsession"
7. "Nightrain"
8. "Double Talkin' Jive"
9. "Civil War"
10. "Move to the City"
11. "Wild Horses" (The Rolling Stones cover)
12. "Patience"
13. "You Could Be Mine"
14. "It's Alright" (Black Sabbath cover)
15. "November Rain"
16. "Sweet Child o' Mine"
17. "Knockin' on Heaven's Door" (Bob Dylan cover)
18. "Paradise City"

=== Fifth setlist ===
(Taken from the Foxborough, Massachusetts, Foxboro Stadium show on September 11, 1992)

1. "Welcome to the Jungle"
2. "Mr. Brownstone"
3. "Live and Let Die" (Paul McCartney and Wings cover)
4. "Attitude" (Misfits cover)
5. "It's So Easy"
6. "Double Talkin' Jive"
7. "Civil War"
8. "Wild Horses" (The Rolling Stones cover)
9. "Patience"
10. "Nightrain"
11. "Out ta Get Me"
12. "You Could Be Mine"
13. "It's Alright" (Black Sabbath cover)
14. "November Rain"
15. "Sweet Child o' Mine"
16. "Knockin' on Heaven's Door" (Bob Dylan cover)
17. "Don't Cry (Original)"
18. "Paradise City"

=== Sixth setlist ===
(Taken from the San Diego, California, Jack Murphy Stadium show on September 30, 1992)

1. "Welcome to the Jungle"
2. "It's So Easy"
3. "Mr. Brownstone"
4. "Nightrain"
5. "Attitude" (Misfits cover)
6. "Live and Let Die" (Paul McCartney and Wings cover)
7. "Bad Obsession"
8. "Wild Horses" (The Rolling Stones cover)
9. "Patience"
10. "Double Talkin' Jive"
11. "Civil War"
12. "You Could Be Mine"
13. "It's Alright" (Black Sabbath cover)
14. "November Rain"
15. "Sweet Child o' Mine"
16. "Knockin' on Heaven's Door" (Bob Dylan cover)
17. "Don't Cry (Original)"
18. "Paradise City"

== Metallica setlists ==
=== First setlist ===
(Taken from the Orchard Park, New York, Rich Stadium show on July 25, 1992)

1. "Creeping Death"
2. "Harvester of Sorrow"
3. "Fade to Black"
4. "Sad but True"
5. "Wherever I May Roam"
6. "Of Wolf and Man"
7. "For Whom the Bell Tolls"
8. "The Unforgiven"
9. "The Shortest Straw"
10. "Bass Solo"
11. "Guitar Solo"
12. "Welcome Home (Sanitarium)"
13. "Master of Puppets"
14. "Seek & Destroy"
15. "Whiplash"
16. "Nothing Else Matters"
17. "Am I Evil?" (Diamond Head cover)
18. "Last Caress" (Misfits cover)
19. "One"
20. "Enter Sandman"

=== Second setlist ===
(Taken from the Pittsburgh, Pennsylvania, Three Rivers Stadium show on July 26, 1992)

1. "Creeping Death"
2. "Harvester of Sorrow"
3. "Fade to Black"
4. "Sad but True"
5. "Wherever I May Roam"
6. "Of Wolf and Man"
7. "For Whom the Bell Tolls"
8. "The Unforgiven"
9. "The Shortest Straw"
10. "Bass Solo"
11. "Guitar Solo"
12. "Welcome Home (Sanitarium)"
13. "Master of Puppets"
14. "Seek & Destroy"
15. "Whiplash"
16. "Nothing Else Matters"
17. "Am I Evil?" (Diamond Head cover)
18. "Last Caress" (Misfits cover)
19. "One"
20. "Enter Sandman"

=== Third setlist ===
(Taken from the Houston, Texas, Astrodome show on September 4, 1992)

1. "Creeping Death"
2. "Harvester of Sorrow"
3. "Welcome Home (Sanitarium)"
4. "Sad but True"
5. "Wherever I May Roam"
6. "Of Wolf and Man"
7. "For Whom the Bell Tolls"
8. "The Unforgiven"
9. "The Shortest Straw"
10. "Bass Solo"
11. "Guitar Solo"
12. "Fade to Black"
13. "Master of Puppets"
14. "Seek & Destroy"
15. "Whiplash"
16. "Nothing Else Matters"
17. "Am I Evil?" (Diamond Head cover)
18. "Last Caress" (Misfits cover)
19. "One"
20. "Enter Sandman"

=== Fourth setlist ===
(Taken from the Columbia, South Carolina, Williams-Brice Stadium show on September 7, 1992)

1. "Creeping Death"
2. "Harvester of Sorrow"
3. "Welcome Home (Sanitarium)"
4. "Sad but True"
5. "Wherever I May Roam"
6. "Of Wolf and Man"
7. "For Whom the Bell Tolls"
8. "The Unforgiven"
9. "The Shortest Straw"
10. "Bass Solo"
11. "Guitar Solo"
12. "Fade to Black"
13. "Master of Puppets"
14. "Seek & Destroy"
15. "Whiplash"
16. "Nothing Else Matters"
17. "Am I Evil?" (Diamond Head cover)
18. "Last Caress" (Misfits cover)
19. "One"
20. "Enter Sandman"

=== Fifth setlist ===
(Taken from the Foxborough, Massachusetts, Foxboro Stadium show on September 11, 1992)

1. "Creeping Death"
2. "Harvester of Sorrow"
3. "Welcome Home (Sanitarium)"
4. "Sad but True"
5. "Wherever I May Roam"
6. "Of Wolf and Man"
7. "For Whom the Bell Tolls"
8. "The Unforgiven"
9. "The Shortest Straw"
10. "Bass Solo"
11. "Guitar Solo"
12. "Fade to Black"
13. "Master of Puppets"
14. "Seek & Destroy"
15. "Whiplash"
16. "Nothing Else Matters"
17. "Am I Evil?" (Diamond Head cover)
18. "Last Caress" (Misfits cover)
19. "One"
20. "Enter Sandman"

=== Sixth setlist ===
(Taken from the San Diego, California, Jack Murphy Stadium show on September 30, 1992)

1. "Creeping Death"
2. "Harvester of Sorrow"
3. "Welcome Home (Sanitarium)"
4. "Sad but True"
5. "Wherever I May Roam"
6. "Of Wolf and Man"
7. "For Whom the Bell Tolls"
8. "The Unforgiven"
9. "The Shortest Straw"
10. "Bass Solo"
11. "Guitar Solo"
12. "Fade to Black"
13. "Master of Puppets"
14. "Seek & Destroy"
15. "Whiplash"
16. "Nothing Else Matters"
17. "Am I Evil?" (Diamond Head cover)
18. "Last Caress" (Misfits cover)
19. "One"
20. "Enter Sandman"

== Tour dates ==
List of 1992 concerts
Date (1992)	City	Country	Venue	Opening act	Attendance	Revenue
July 17	Washington, D.C.	United States	RFK Stadium	Faith No More	47,498 / 47,498	$1,306,195
July 18	East Rutherford	United States	Giants Stadium	Faith No More	54,300 / 54,300	$1,479,830
July 21	Pontiac	United States	Pontiac Silverdome	Faith No More	47,540 / 47,540	$1,378,660
July 22	Indianapolis	United States	Hoosier Dome	Faith No More	38,900 / 46,000	$1,039,720
July 25	Orchard Park	United States	Rich Stadium	Faith No More	44,833 / 59,326	$1,322,574
July 26	Pittsburgh	United States	Three Rivers Stadium	Faith No More	49,345 / 49,345	$1,356,988
July 29	East Rutherford	United States	Giants Stadium	Faith No More	49,250 / 55,000	$1,338,618
August 8	Montreal	Canada	Olympic Stadium	Faith No More	54,666 / 54,666	$610,674
August 25	Avondale	United States	Phoenix International Raceway	Faith No More	29,903 / 29,903	$794,820
August 27	Las Cruces	United States	Aggie Memorial Stadium	Faith No More	35,373 / 35,373	$972,758
August 29	New Orleans	United States	Louisiana Superdome	Faith No More	39,278 / 39,278	$1,080,145
August 31	Atlanta	United States	Lakewood Amphitheatre	Faith No More	—N/a	—N/a
September 2	Orlando	United States	Citrus Bowl	Faith No More	48,035 / 50,000	$1,320,963
September 4	Houston	United States	Astrodome	Faith No More	44,025 / 44,025	$1,191,601
September 5	Irving	United States	Texas Stadium	Faith No More	44,391 / 44,391	$1,220,753
September 7	Columbia	United States	Williams-Brice Stadium	Faith No More	37,716 / 40,136	$1,037,190
September 11	Foxborough	United States	Foxboro Stadium	Faith No More	51,038 / 51,038	$1,402,335
September 13 (Note: The show on September 13 was originally scheduled on August 9, but was postponed due to James' injuries as a result of the pyrotechnic incident in Montreal.)	Toronto	Canada	Exhibition Stadium	Faith No More	49,888 / 49,888	$1,332,917
September 15	Minneapolis	United States	Hubert H. Humphrey Metrodome	Faith No More	43,292 / 43,292	$1,190,530
September 17	Kansas City	United States	Arrowhead Stadium	Faith No More; Body Count	36,356 / 43,500	$999,790
September 19 (Note: The show on September 19 was originally scheduled on August 12, but was postponed due to James' injuries as a result of the pyrotechnic incident in Montreal.)	Denver	United States	Mile High Stadium	Faith No More	44,096 / 44,096	$161,377
September 24 (Note: The show on September 24 was originally scheduled on August 21, but was postponed due to James' injuries as a result of the pyrotechnic incident in Montreal.)	Oakland	United States	Oakland–Alameda County Coliseum	Body Count	59,800 / 59,800	$1,650,668
September 27	Los Angeles	United States	Los Angeles Coliseum	Motörhead	35,293 / 45,000	$932,570
September 30 (Note: The show on September 30 was originally scheduled on August 14, but was postponed due to James' injuries as a result of the pyrotechnic incident in Montreal.)	San Diego	United States	Jack Murphy Stadium	Body Count	42,167 / 45,938	$1,159,593
October 3 (Note: The show on October 3 was originally scheduled on August 22, but was postponed due to James' injuries as a result of the pyrotechnic incident in Montreal.)	Pasadena	United States	Rose Bowl Stadium	Motörhead; Body Count	68,639 / 68,639	$1,852,978
October 6 (Note: The show on October 6 was originally scheduled on August 18, but was postponed due to James' injuries as a result of the pyrotechnic incident in Montreal.)	Seattle	United States	Kingdome	Motörhead; Body Count	37,226 / 40,000	$1,023,715
Total					1,132,848 / 1,187,972 (95.36%)	$27,157,962

=== Cancelled dates ===
List of 1992 concerts
Date (1992)	City	Country	Venue	Reason	Ref.
August 17	Vancouver	Canada	BC Place	James' injuries as a result of the pyrotechnic incident in Montreal	

== Personnel ==
Guns N' Roses

- W. Axl Rose – lead vocals, piano, whistle, whistling, tambourine
- Slash – lead guitar, backing vocals, talkbox
- Duff McKagan – bass, backing vocals, lead vocals on "Attitude"
- Matt Sorum – drums, percussion, backing vocals
- Dizzy Reed – keyboards, piano, organ, synthesizer, percussion, tambourine, backing vocals
- Gilby Clarke – rhythm guitar, backing vocals, drum on "Knocking On Heaven's Door"

Metallica

- James Hetfield – lead vocals, rhythm guitar
- Kirk Hammett – lead guitar, backing vocals
- Lars Ulrich – drums, percussion
- Jason Newsted – bass, backing vocals
- John Marshall – rhythm guitar (August 25 – October 6)

Faith No More (July 17-removed September 21)

- Mike Patton – lead vocals
- Jim Martin – lead guitar, backing vocals, rhythm guitar on "Last Caress" during Metallica's set
- Billy Gould – bass, backing vocals
- Mike Bordin – drums
- Roddy Bottum – keyboards, backing vocals

Motörhead (September 27-October 6)

- Ian "Lemmy" Kilmister – lead vocals, bass
- Phil "Wizzö" Campbell – lead guitar, backing vocals
- Würzel – lead guitar
- Mickey Dee – drums

Body Count (September 17-October 6)

- Ice-T – lead vocals
- Ernie C – lead guitar
- D-Roc the Executioner – rhythm guitar
- Mooseman – bass
- Beatmaster V – drums

Touring musicians for Guns N' Roses

- Teddy Andreadis – keyboards, backing vocals, harmonica, tambourine
- Roberta Freeman – backing vocals, tambourine
- Traci Amos – backing vocals, tambourine
- Diane Jones – backing vocals, tambourine
- Anne King – trumpet
- Cece Worrall-Rubin – saxophone
- Lisa Maxwell – saxophone

Additional musicians for Guns N' Roses

- Shannon Hoon – backing vocals on "Don't Cry" (Original) (July 22, 1992)
