= Garden of Eden (Guns N' Roses song) =

Promotional single by Guns N' Roses

from the album Use Your Illusion I
- Released: 1993
- Recorded: A&M Studios, Record Plant Studios, Studio 56, Image Recording, Conway Studios & Metalworks Recording Studios - 1991
- Genre: Art metal, speed metal, hard rock
- Length: 2:41
- Label: Geffen
- Songwriters: Axl Rose; Slash
- Producer: Mike Clink

Music video
- "Garden of Eden" on YouTube

"Garden of Eden" is a song by American hard rock band Guns N' Roses (written by Axl Rose and Slash), which appears on the album Use Your Illusion I.

According to Slash, the song was written while the band was rehearsing for an extended period of time in Chicago.

== Music videos ==
There is a music video of the song, which consists of one continuous shot which features a close-up of Rose with the band playing in the background, while keyboardist Dizzy Reed and Teddy Andreadis (who played the harmonica for the band during the Use Your Illusion Tour) are seen dancing in the background.

There are two versions of the video, both made in 1992: one, which can be found on music video sites like Yahoo Music, includes paper flying through the air throughout, while the other, which can be found on the Guns N' Roses music video compilation Welcome to the Videos, lacks the paper but includes the song's lyrics, complete with "follow-‌the-‌bouncing-‌ball" effect.

This video was used as music video fodder for the MTV re-airing of the pilot episode of Beavis and Butthead. Additionally, Rolling Stone ranked it 7th best out of 17 in its ranking of Guns N' Roses music videos.

== Garden of Eden: Strictly Limited Edition ==
Garden of Eden: Strictly Limited Edition

Video by Guns N' Roses
- Released: May 24, 1993
- Recorded: 1992–1993
- Genre: Heavy metal
- Length: 10:09
- Label: Geffen Home Video

Guns N' Roses chronology
The "Civil War" EP (1993)	Garden of Eden: Strictly Limited Edition (1993)	"The Spaghetti Incident?" (1993)

Garden of Eden: Strictly Limited Edition is a VHS video single released in 1992, featuring music videos by the American hard rock group Guns N' Roses recorded between 1992 and 1993.

The videos for "Garden of Eden" and "Dead Horse" received rotation on video networks to promote their releases as radio promos in 1993 and were both later included on the collection Welcome to the Videos in 1998. The live performance of "Yesterdays" was originally broadcast on the American Music Awards in 1992 prior to this release. The audio recording was made available on the "Yesterdays" single in 1992 and Live Era '87–'93 in 1999.

== Track listing ==
1. "Garden of Eden"
2. "Dead Horse"
3. "Yesterdays" (live: Las Vegas, USA; January 25, 1992)
