= Greatest Hits (Guns N' Roses album) =

Greatest hits album by Guns N' Roses
- Released: March 23, 2004
- Recorded: 1987–1994 (original); 1986–1994 (2020 reissue)
- Genres: Hard rock, heavy metal
- Length: 79:24 (original); 82:30 (2020 reissue)
- Label: Geffen
- Producers: Guns N' Roses, Mike Clink, Bill Levenson

Guns N' Roses chronology
Live Era '87–'93 (1999)	Greatest Hits (2004)	Chinese Democracy (2008)

Greatest Hits is a compilation album by the American hard rock band Guns N' Roses, released on March 23, 2004. Released by Geffen Records in part because of the delay in the making of Chinese Democracy, the album was subject to lawsuits by band member Axl Rose and former band members, in an attempt to block its release due to its track listing.

Despite the album having almost no promotion, it reached number one on the UK Albums Chart and number three on the Billboard 200 chart upon its release. Greatest Hits re-entered the Billboard 200 at number three in March 2012, selling about 85,000 copies as part of a promotion by both Amazon and Google Play that saw the album sold for 25 cents for one day. The album has proven a popular seller, selling over six million copies in the United States by 2018. Greatest Hits is one of the longest charting albums in the Billboard 200 era, being one of only seven albums to notch at least 400 weeks on the chart by June 2017. As of July 2023, it has spent 631 weeks on the chart.

== Lawsuit ==
Axl Rose immediately tried to block the release by suing Geffen, saying it would ruin his focus on Chinese Democracy and if he were to get the album finished and released sooner, the Greatest Hits album would be selling more, leaving the album unnoticed. Former bandmates Slash and Duff McKagan helped Rose file the lawsuit against Geffen, although they did not speak to each other in person. The lawsuit failed and the album was released under Geffen Records' rights.

== Reception ==
Professional ratings
Review scores
Source	Rating
AllMusic	3/5 stars
NME	9/10 stars
Pitchfork	3.9/10
Stylus	D+
Ultimate Guitar	9.4/10

The album received mixed reviews, with several critics complaining of the track listing, feeling several notable songs were missing. AllMusic criticized the album for "(giving) an inaccurate portrait of the band", saying "it bears all the hallmarks of a slapdash compilation, hastily assembled by the label as a way to buy time between releases. There are no liner notes, the cardboard packaging is flimsy, (&) the remastering isn't notable." The review singled out "Nightrain", "Estranged", "It's So Easy", "Mr. Brownstone" and "Used to Love Her" as songs that should have been on the album but weren't.

Pop Matters stated the album "does nothing to enhance the legacy of a once-proud rock band. There are no hidden insights into the inner workings of the group, no lost classics, and no evidence of their contribution to a new generation of musicians. Instead we are left with an inflated sticker price for a Pandora's box of tracks..." Pitchfork criticized the compilation for having too many covers, as well as not including songs such as "Out Ta Get Me", "Used to Love Her", and "One in a Million". BBC criticized the songs for being dated. The Maneater stated "The appearance of the album gives the impression of a record company that focused solely on the fact that people would buy the album even if it were wrapped in brown wrapping paper." and criticized the compilation for not including songs such as "Estranged", "Mr. Brownstone", and "Pretty Tied Up".

In a positive review, NME stated "It’s packed with pomp, spunk and circumstance, makes blokes want to fight and girls want to dance. What the fuck else is there?".

== Track listing ==
No.	Title	Writer(s)	Original album	Length
1.	"Welcome to the Jungle"	Axl Rose, Jeffrey Isbell, Saul Hudson, Michael McKagan, Steven Adler	Appetite for Destruction (1987)	4:32
2.	"Sweet Child o' Mine"	Rose, Isbell, Hudson, McKagan, Adler	Appetite for Destruction	5:55
3.	"Patience"	Rose, Isbell, Hudson, McKagan, Adler	G N' R Lies (1988)	5:56
4.	"Paradise City"	Rose, Isbell, Hudson, McKagan, Adler	Appetite for Destruction	6:47
5.	"Knockin' on Heaven's Door" (Bob Dylan cover)	Bob Dylan	Use Your Illusion II (1991)	5:36
6.	"Civil War"	Rose, Isbell, Hudson, McKagan	Nobody's Child: Romanian Angel Appeal (1990) also on Use Your Illusion II	7:42
7.	"You Could Be Mine"	Rose, Isbell, Hudson, McKagan	Use Your Illusion II	5:44
8.	"Don't Cry" (original version)	Rose, Isbell, Hudson, McKagan	Use Your Illusion I (1991)	4:51
9.	"November Rain"	Rose, Isbell, Hudson, McKagan	Use Your Illusion I	8:57
10.	"Live and Let Die" (Paul McCartney and Wings Cover version)	Paul McCartney, Linda McCartney	Use Your Illusion I	3:02
11.	"Yesterdays"	Rose, West Arkeen, Del James, Billy McCloud	Use Your Illusion II	3:18
12.	"Ain't It Fun" (radio version) (Dead Boys cover)	Cheetah Chrome, Peter Laughner	"The Spaghetti Incident?" (1993)	5:10
13.	"Since I Don't Have You" (The Skyliners cover)	Jackie Taylor, James Beaumont, Janet Vogel, Joseph Rock, Joe Verscharen, Lennie Martin, Wally Lester	"The Spaghetti Incident?"	4:18
14.	"Sympathy for the Devil" (The Rolling Stones cover)	Mick Jagger, Keith Richards	Interview with the Vampire (soundtrack) (1994)	7:36
Total length:				79:24

The 2020 re-issue adds "Shadow of Your Love" as track 3, advancing all subsequent entries by one position without omitting any original songs.

2020 re-issue
No.	Title	Writer(s)	Length
3.	"Shadow of Your Love"	Rose, Stradlin, Paul Tobias	3:06
Total length:			82:30

2023 Target exclusive vinyl
No.	Title	Writer(s)	Length
1.	"Welcome to the Jungle"	Axl Rose, Jeffrey Isbell, Saul Hudson, Michael McKagan, Steven Adler	4:32
2.	"Sweet Child o' Mine"	Rose, Isbell, Hudson, McKagan, Adler	5:55
3.	"Patience"	Rose, Isbell, Hudson, McKagan, Adler	5:56
4.	"Paradise City"	Rose, Isbell, Hudson, McKagan, Adler	6:47
5.	"You Could Be Mine"	Rose, Isbell, Hudson, McKagan	5:44
6.	"Don't Cry" (original version)	Rose, Isbell, Hudson, McKagan	4:57
7.	"November Rain"	Rose, Isbell, Hudson, McKagan	8:57
8.	"Hard Skool"	Guns N' Roses	3:42

== Personnel ==
Credits are adapted from the album's liner notes.

=== Guns N' Roses ===
- W. Axl Rose – lead vocals, percussion on "Welcome to the Jungle", whistling on "Patience" and "Civil War", synthesizer and whistle on "Paradise City", keyboards on "Since I Don't Have You" and "Live and Let Die", piano on "November Rain", "Yesterdays," and "Sympathy for the Devil"
- Slash – lead guitar, acoustic guitar on "Civil War", "Sweet Child o' Mine" and "Knockin' On Heaven's Door", lead acoustic guitar on "Patience"
- Izzy Stradlin – rhythm guitar (on tracks 1, 2, 4–11 and "Shadow of Your Love"), rhythm acoustic guitar on "Patience", backing vocals on tracks 1–11
- Duff McKagan – bass, backing vocals, rhythm acoustic guitar on "Patience"
- Steven Adler – drums (on tracks 1, 2, 4, and 6 and "Shadow of Your Love" and "Civil War"), backing vocals on "Patience"
- Matt Sorum – drums and backing vocals on tracks 5, 7–14
- Dizzy Reed – keyboards and piano on tracks 5–14, organ
- Gilby Clarke – rhythm guitar and backing vocals on "Ain't It Fun" and "Since I Don't Have You"
- Paul Huge – rhythm guitar on "Sympathy for the Devil"

=== Additional personnel ===
- Michael Monroe – co-lead vocals on "Ain't It Fun"
- Mike Staggs – additional guitars on "Ain't It Fun"
- West Arkeen – percussion on "Patience"
- Rick Richards – percussion on "Patience"
- Ray Grden – percussion on "Patience"
- Howard Teman – percussion on "Patience"
- The Waters – backing vocals on "Knockin' on Heaven's Door"
- Shannon Hoon – backing vocals on "Live and Let Die", "November Rain", co-lead vocals on "Don't Cry"
- Johann Langlie – programming on "Live and Let Die", "November Rain"
- Reba Shaw – backing vocals on "November Rain"
- Stuart Bailey – backing vocals on "November Rain"
- Jon Thautwein – horn on "Live and Let Die"
- Matthew McKagan – horn on "Live and Let Die"
- Rachel West – horn on "Live and Let Die"
- Robert Clark – horn on "Live and Let Die"

== Charts ==
=== Weekly charts ===
Weekly chart performance for Greatest Hits
Chart (2004–2020)	Peak position
Australian Albums (ARIA)	5
Austrian Albums (Ö3 Austria)	1
Belgian Albums (Ultratop Flanders)	1
Belgian Albums (Ultratop Wallonia)	26
Brazilian Albums (ABPD)	15
Canadian Albums (Billboard)	2
Danish Albums (Hitlisten)	4
Dutch Albums (Album Top 100)	3
Finnish Albums (Suomen virallinen lista)	1
French Albums (SNEP)	138
German Albums (Offizielle Top 100)	4
Hungarian Albums (MAHASZ)	1
Irish Albums (IRMA)	1
Italian Albums (FIMI)	2
New Zealand Albums (RMNZ)	1
Norwegian Albums (VG-lista)	1
Portuguese Albums (AFP)	7
Scottish Albums (Official Charts)	1
Singaporean Albums (RIAS)	1
Spanish Albums (PROMUSICAE)	8
Swedish Albums (Sverigetopplistan)	2
Swiss Albums (Schweizer Hitparade)	2
UK Albums (Official Charts)	1
US Billboard 200	3
US Top Rock Albums (Billboard)	7

=== Year-end charts ===
2004 year-end chart performance for Greatest Hits
Chart (2004)	Position
Australian Albums (ARIA)	21
Austrian Albums (Ö3 Austria)	16
Belgian Albums (Ultratop Flanders)	13
Dutch Albums (Album Top 100)	9
German Albums (Offizielle Top 100)	26
Hungarian Albums (MAHASZ)	21
Irish Albums (IRMA)	3
Italian Albums (FIMI)	27
New Zealand Albums (RMNZ)	2
Swedish Albums (Sverigetopplistan)	14
Swiss Albums (Schweizer Hitparade)	11
UK Albums (OCC)	11
US Billboard 200	42
Worldwide Albums (IFPI)	9

2005 year-end chart performance for Greatest Hits
Chart (2005)	Position
Australian Albums (ARIA)	88
UK Albums (OCC)	191
US Billboard 200	47

2006 year-end chart performance for Greatest Hits
Chart (2006)	Position
UK Albums (OCC)	148
US Billboard 200	73

2008 year-end chart performance for Greatest Hits
Chart (2008)	Position
UK Albums (OCC)	137

2009 year-end chart performance for Greatest Hits
Chart (2009)	Position
UK Albums (OCC)	116

2010 year-end chart performance for Greatest Hits
Chart (2010)	Position
Australian Albums (ARIA)	51
Swedish Albums (Sverigetopplistan)	96
UK Albums (OCC)	113
US Billboard 200	165

2011 year-end chart performance for Greatest Hits
Chart (2011)	Position
Italian Albums (FIMI)	81
UK Albums (OCC)	115

2012 year-end chart performance for Greatest Hits
Chart (2012)	Position
UK Albums (OCC)	159
US Billboard 200	108

2013 year-end chart performance for Greatest Hits
Chart (2013)	Position
Australian Albums (ARIA)	70
UK Albums (OCC)	175

2014 year-end chart performance for Greatest Hits
Chart (2014)	Position
Australian Albums (ARIA)	81

2015 year-end chart performance for Greatest Hits
Chart (2015)	Position
US Billboard 200	155

2016 year-end chart performance for Greatest Hits
Chart (2016)	Position
Canadian Albums (Billboard)	44
US Billboard 200	133

2017 year-end chart performance for Greatest Hits
Chart (2017)	Position
Australian Albums (ARIA)	31
Austrian Albums (Ö3 Austria)	74
Canadian Albums (Billboard)	25
US Billboard 200	140
US Top Rock Albums (Billboard)	21

2018 year-end chart performance for Greatest Hits
Chart (2018)	Position
Australian Albums (ARIA)	53
US Top Rock Albums (Billboard)	39

2019 year-end chart performance for Greatest Hits
Chart (2019)	Position
US Billboard 200	157
US Top Rock Albums (Billboard)	26

2020 year-end chart performance for Greatest Hits
Chart (2020)	Position
UK Albums (OCC)	84
US Top Rock Albums (Billboard)	44

2021 year-end chart performance for Greatest Hits
Chart (2021)	Position
Canadian Albums (Billboard)	50
US Billboard 200	115
US Top Rock Albums (Billboard)	19

2022 year-end chart performance for Greatest Hits
Chart (2022)	Position
Polish Albums (ZPAV)	71
US Billboard 200	81
US Top Rock Albums (Billboard)	9

2023 year-end chart performance for Greatest Hits
Chart (2023)	Position
UK Albums (OCC)	92
US Billboard 200	96
US Top Rock Albums (Billboard)	12

2024 year-end chart performance for Greatest Hits
Chart (2024)	Position
US Billboard 200	104

=== Decade-end charts ===
2000s decade-end chart performance for Greatest Hits
Chart (2000–2009)	Position
Australian Albums (ARIA)	75
UK Albums (OCC)	67
US Billboard 200	105

2010s decade-end chart performance for Greatest Hits
Chart (2010–2019)	Position
Australian Albums (ARIA)	48

== Certifications and sales ==
Certifications and sales for Greatest Hits
Region	Certification	Certified units/sales
Argentina (CAPIF)	2× Platinum	80,000^{^}
Australia (ARIA)	9× Platinum	630,000^{^}
Austria (IFPI Austria)	Gold	15,000^{*}
Belgium (BRMA)	Platinum	50,000^{*}
Brazil (Pro-Música Brasil)	Gold	50,000^{*}
Canada (Music Canada)	2× Platinum	200,000^{^}
Denmark (IFPI Danmark)	Platinum	40,000^{^}
Finland (Musiikkituottajat)	Platinum	31,665
Germany (BVMI)	Platinum	200,000^{^}
Greece (IFPI Greece)	Gold	10,000^{^}
Hungary (MAHASZ)	Gold	10,000^{^}
Ireland (IRMA)	6× Platinum	90,000^{^}
Italy (FIMI) sales since 2009	2× Platinum	100,000^{*}
Japan (RIAJ)	Gold	100,000^{^}
Mexico (AMPROFON)	Gold	50,000^{^}
Netherlands (NVPI)	Platinum	80,000^{^}
New Zealand (RMNZ)	6× Platinum	90,000^{^}
Poland (ZPAV)	3× Platinum	60,000^{‡}
Portugal (AFP)	Gold	20,000^{^}
Spain (Promusicae)	Platinum	100,000^{^}
Sweden (GLF)	Platinum	60,000^{^}
Switzerland (IFPI Switzerland)	Platinum	40,000^{^}
United Kingdom (BPI)	8× Platinum	2,400,000^{‡}
United States (RIAA)	5× Platinum	5,000,000^{^}
Summaries
Europe (IFPI)	4× Platinum	4,000,000^{*}
^{*} Sales figures based on certification alone.^{^} Shipments figures based on certification alone.^{‡} Sales+streaming figures based on certification alone.
