= Live Era '87–'93 =

Live album by Guns N' Roses
- Released: November 30, 1999
- Recorded: June 28, 1987; December 10, 1988; April 10 and 28, 1993; 1991–1992
- Genre: Hard rock
- Length: 133:02
- Label: Geffen
- Producer: Del James

Guns N' Roses chronology
Welcome to the Videos (1998)	Live Era '87–'93 (1999)	Greatest Hits (2004)

Professional ratings
Review scores
Source	Rating
AllMusic	2.5/5 stars
Rolling Stone	3.5/5 stars

Live Era '87–'93 is a double live album by the American hard rock band Guns N' Roses. It was released on November 30, 1999. The record was the first official Guns N' Roses release since "The Spaghetti Incident?" released 6 years prior in 1993.

The album is certified gold by the RIAA for shipments of 500,000 copies.

== Album information ==
The album was compiled by band associate Del James. The dates and locations of the tracks are not revealed in the liner notes and are referred to simply as being "recorded across the universe between 1987 and 1993". However, the majority are believed to be from the Use Your Illusion Tour of 1991—1993.

Axl Rose is alleged to have communicated through intermediaries with former Guns N' Roses members Slash and Duff McKagan to select the track list. "The live album was one of the easiest projects we all worked on," Slash noted. "I didn't actually see Axl, but we communicated via the powers that be." Slash notes that the album is "not pretty and there are a lot of mistakes, but this is Guns N' Roses, not the fucking Mahavishnu Orchestra. It's as honest as it gets." According to former band manager Doug Goldstein, the overdubs and retakes were "fixes as opposed to redoing the whole thing", and it was "the original recorded material but Slash spent most of the time re-dubbing tracks.... Axl did a couple of fixes but from what I remember it certainly wasn't every track." Matt Sorum and Gilby Clarke, who play on the majority of the tracks, are not credited as band members, but as "additional musicians". Classic-member drummer Steven Adler, who plays on only three tracks, and Izzy Stradlin, who plays on six, are credited as "main band members".

Two popular live songs, "Live and Let Die" and "Civil War" – both played frequently during the Use Your Illusion Tour – are omitted from this release. Songs that were played to a much lesser extent ("Pretty Tied Up" and "Move to the City") are included.

The Japanese and vinyl versions of the album contain a rare performance of "Coma".

"Knockin' on Heaven's Door" was performed and recorded at the Freddie Mercury Tribute Concert and was previously released on the "Knockin' on Heaven's Door" single.

"Estranged", "Don't Cry", "November Rain", "Pretty Tied Up", "You Could Be Mine" and "Move to the City" were previously released on the band's Use Your Illusion I and Use Your Illusion II videos. The live audio from "Yesterdays" was included as a B-side on that song's CD single.

In October 2025, a remastered version of Live Era was announced, arriving on vinyl on November 21.

== Track listing ==
All music and lyrics written by Guns N' Roses, except where noted.

Disc one
No.	Title	Writer(s)	Album	Length
1.	"Nightrain"		Appetite for Destruction (1987)	5:19
2.	"Mr. Brownstone"		Appetite for Destruction (1987)	5:42
3.	"It's So Easy"	Guns N' Roses, West Arkeen	Appetite for Destruction (1987)	3:28
4.	"Welcome to the Jungle"		Appetite for Destruction (1987)	5:09
5.	"Dust N' Bones"	Slash, Stradlin, McKagan	Use Your Illusion I (1991)	5:05
6.	"My Michelle"		Appetite for Destruction (1987)	3:53
7.	"You're Crazy"		Appetite for Destruction (1987) / G N' R Lies (1988)	4:45
8.	"Used to Love Her"		G N' R Lies (1987)	4:17
9.	"Patience"		G N' R Lies (1987)	6:42
10.	"It's Alright" (Black Sabbath cover)	Bill Ward	None	3:07
11.	"November Rain"	Rose	Use Your Illusion I (1991)	12:32
12.	"Coma"	Rose, Slash	Use Your Illusion I (Bonus) (1991)	10:50
Total length:				59:54

Disc 2
No.	Title	Writer(s)	Album	Length
1.	"Out ta Get Me"		Appetite for Destruction (1987)	4:33
2.	"Pretty Tied Up"	Stradlin	Use Your Illusion II (1991)	5:25
3.	"Yesterdays"	Rose, Arkeen, Del James, Billy McCloud	Use Your Illusion II (1991)	3:52
4.	"Move to the City"	Stradlin, Chris Weber, Daniel Nicolson (a/k/a D.J.)	Live ?!*@ Like a Suicide (1986)	8:00
5.	"You Could Be Mine"	Rose, Stradlin	Use Your Illusion II (1991)	6:02
6.	"Rocket Queen"		Appetite for Destruction (1987)	8:27
7.	"Sweet Child O' Mine"		Appetite for Destruction (1987)	7:25
8.	"Knockin' on Heaven's Door" (Bob Dylan cover)	Bob Dylan	Use Your Illusion II (1991)	7:27
9.	"Don't Cry"	Rose, Stradlin	Use Your Illusion I / II (1991)	4:44
10.	"Estranged"	Rose	Use Your Illusion II (1991)	9:52
11.	"Paradise City"		Appetite for Destruction (1987)	7:22
Total length:				1:13:09

== Personnel ==
Credits are adapted from the album's liner notes.

=== Band members ===
- W. Axl Rose – lead vocals, piano on "It's Alright" and "November Rain", whistling on "Patience", whistle on "Paradise City", backing vocals on "Dust N' Bones"
- Slash – lead guitar, rhythm guitar, acoustic guitar on "Patience", talkbox on "Dust N' Bones" and "Rocket Queen", slide guitar on "Rocket Queen", backing vocals
- Izzy Stradlin – rhythm guitar, backing vocals, lead vocals on "Dust N' Bones" (1987–1991)
- Duff McKagan – bass guitar, acoustic guitar on "Patience", backing vocals
- Steven Adler – drums (1987–1988)
- Dizzy Reed – keyboards, piano, synthesizer, percussion, backing vocals (1991–1993)
- Matt Sorum – drums, percussion, backing vocals (1991–1993)
- Gilby Clarke – rhythm guitar, co-lead guitar on "Nightrain", acoustic guitar on "Patience", backing vocals (1991–1993)

=== Backing musicians ===
- Shannon Hoon – co-lead/backing vocals on “Don’t Cry”
- Teddy Andreadis – backing vocals, harmonica, percussion, keyboards (1992)
- Roberta Freeman – backing vocals (1992)
- Tracey Amos – backing vocals (1992)
- Cece Worrall – horns (1992)
- Anne King – horns (1992)
- Lisa Maxwell – horns (1992)

== Charts ==
Chart performance for Live Era '87–'93
Chart (1999–2007)	Peak position
Austrian Albums (Ö3 Austria)	29
Canada Top Albums/CDs (RPM)	25
Dutch Albums (Album Top 100)	16
Finnish Albums (Suomen virallinen lista)	29
German Albums (Offizielle Top 100)	27
New Zealand Albums (RMNZ)	32
Norwegian Albums (VG-lista)	17
Spanish Albums (Promusicae)	96
Swedish Albums (Sverigetopplistan)	49
Swiss Albums (Schweizer Hitparade)	31
UK Albums (Official Charts)	45
US Billboard 200	45

== Certifications ==
Region	Certification	Certified units/sales
Argentina (CAPIF)	Platinum	60,000^{^}
Australia (ARIA)	Platinum	70,000^{^}
Brazil (Pro-Música Brasil)	Gold	100,000^{*}
Canada (Music Canada)	Platinum	100,000^{^}
Japan (RIAJ)	Gold	100,000^{^}
United Kingdom (BPI)	Gold	100,000^{^}
United States (RIAA)	Gold	500,000^{^}
^{*} Sales figures based on certification alone.^{^} Shipments figures based on certification alone.

== See also ==
- List of glam metal albums and songs
