= The "Civil War" EP =

EP by Guns N' Roses
- Released: May 24, 1993
- Recorded: 1990–1991
- Genre: Hard rock
- Length: 20:44
- Label: Geffen
- Producers: Mike Clink; Guns N' Roses

Guns N' Roses chronology
Use Your Illusion World Tour I and Use Your Illusion World Tour II (1992)	The "Civil War" EP (1993)	Garden of Eden: Strictly Limited Edition (1993)

The "Civil War" EP (better known as simply Civil War) is the third extended play by Guns N' Roses, released in the UK only on May 24, 1993. It is named after the song of the same name. The EP is a compilation, departing from the band's previous two live-style EPs. Included are songs from both Use Your Illusion I and Use Your Illusion II, and an exclusive interview with Slash.

== Artwork ==
The front cover to the EP is black. Each copy was individually numbered. On the case of the CD, the silver words "Guns N' Roses" were stuck on. The EP-style case features a flap advertisement in the "booklet", with one side advertising the band's gig at Milton Keynes, England, and the other side advertises the band's video single for "Garden of Eden", which was released on the same day.

On the German edition's front cover, the subtitle 'Civil War' and the blood-like graphical element is more on the right lower corner, and there is no individual numbering.

== Track listing ==
CD (GFSTD 43)
No.	Title	Writer(s)	Length
1.	"Civil War" (LP version)	Axl Rose, Slash, Duff McKagan	7:36
2.	"Garden of Eden" (LP version)	Slash, Rose	2:36
3.	"Dead Horse" (LP version)	Rose	4:11
4.	"Exclusive Interview with Slash" (incorrect length given as 7:21)		7:12

== Personnel ==
Guns N' Roses

- W. Axl Rose – lead vocals, whistling on "Civil War", sound effects on "Garden of Eden", acoustic guitar on "Dead Horse"
- Slash – lead guitar, banjo on "Civil War"
- Izzy Stradlin – rhythm guitar, backing vocals
- Duff McKagan – bass, backing vocals
- Matt Sorum – drums, percussion (except on "Civil War")
- Steven Adler – drums on "Civil War"
- Dizzy Reed – piano, backing vocals

Additional personnel

- Johann Langlie – synthesizer programming on "Garden of Eden"
- Mike Clink – nutcracker on "Dead Horse", production, engineering
- Bill Price – mixing
- George Marino – mastering

== Charts ==
Chart (1993)	Peak position
Ireland (IRMA) The "Civil War" EP	15
UK Singles (Official Charts) The "Civil War" EP	11
