= Welcome to the Videos =

Video by Guns N' Roses
- Released: October 27, 1998
- Recorded: 1987–1994
- Genre: Hard rock; heavy metal; glam metal
- Length: 70:46
- Label: Geffen Home Video

Guns N' Roses chronology
Use Your Illusion (1998)	Welcome to the Videos (1998)	Live Era '87–'93 (1999)

Professional ratings
Review scores
Source	Rating
Allmusic	4.5/5 stars

Welcome to the Videos is a video compilation originally released on VHS and VCD in 1998. It features music videos by the American rock group Guns N' Roses. All the videos featured were made between 1987 and 1994. In many ways, it is a video forerunner to their Greatest Hits compilation album of 2004. It was released on DVD in October 2003.

Licensing issues prevented the inclusion of the "You Could Be Mine" video, as it featured clips from Terminator 2: Judgment Day.

The release was certified 2× Platinum by the RIAA, shipping over 200,000 copies.

== Track listing ==
No.	Title	Length
1.	"Welcome to the Jungle"	4:40
2.	"Sweet Child o' Mine"	5:03
3.	"Paradise City"	6:49
4.	"Patience"	5:57
5.	"Don't Cry (Original version)"	5:14
6.	"Live and Let Die"	3:15
7.	"November Rain"	9:17
8.	"Yesterdays"	3:20
9.	"The Garden"	5:26
10.	"Dead Horse"	4:33
11.	"Garden of Eden"	2:55
12.	"Estranged"	9:48
13.	"Since I Don't Have You"	4:29

== Charts ==
Chart (2003)	Peak position
US Music Videos Chart	5

Chart (2004)	Peak position
Australian Music DVDs Chart	37
Finnish Music DVDs Chart	2
Irish Music DVDs Chart	4
New Zealand Music DVDs Chart	4

Chart (2005)	Peak position
Greek Music DVDs Chart	14

== Certifications ==
Region	Certification	Certified units/sales
Argentina (CAPIF)	Platinum	8,000^{^}
Australia (ARIA)	7× Platinum	105,000^{^}
Brazil (Pro-Música Brasil)	Gold	25,000^{*}
Mexico (AMPROFON)	Gold	10,000^{^}
New Zealand (RMNZ)	Platinum	5,000^{^}
United Kingdom (BPI)	3× Platinum	150,000^{*}
United States (RIAA)	2× Platinum	200,000^{^}
^{*} Sales figures based on certification alone.^{^} Shipments figures based on certification alone.
