= Dead Horse (song) =

Promotional single by Guns N' Roses

from the album Use Your Illusion I
- Released: 1993
- Recorded: A&M Studios, Record Plant Studios, Studio 56, Image Recording, Conway Studios & Metalworks Recording Studios 1990–1991
- Genre: Hard rock; heavy metal
- Length: 4:17
- Label: Geffen
- Songwriter: Axl Rose
- Producers: Mike Clink, Guns N' Roses

Music video
- "Dead Horse" on YouTube

"Dead Horse" is a song by American rock band Guns N' Roses. It appears on their 1991 release, Use Your Illusion I. The composition starts out with an acoustic section, which features a guitar riff written by lead vocalist Axl Rose. Following the sound of a nutcracker, the electric guitars soon come in for the heavier section which dominates the song. After the final climactic chorus, the opening section is reprised for another bar. The song ends with an audio effect featuring the song being fast-forwarded.

The song was never released as a single but was issued to radio stations in 1993 as a 5" CD radio promo. A music video made in 1993, directed by Louis Marciano, first appeared on the VHS only release entitled Garden of Eden: Strictly Limited Edition and later on the Welcome to the Videos compilation in 1998.

== Personnel ==
Guns N' Roses

- W. Axl Rose – lead vocals, acoustic guitar
- Slash – lead guitar
- Izzy Stradlin – rhythm guitar
- Duff McKagan – bass
- Matt Sorum – drums

Additional musicians

- Mike Clink – nutcracker
