= Yesterdays (Guns N' Roses song) =

1992 single by Guns N' Roses

Single by Guns N' Roses

from the album Use Your Illusion II
- B-side: "Yesterdays" (live)
- Released: November 2, 1992
- Genre: Blues rock; art rock
- Length: 3:13
- Label: Geffen
- Songwriters: Axl Rose; West Arkeen; Del James; Billy McCloud
- Producers: Mike Clink; Guns N' Roses

Guns N' Roses singles chronology
| "Knockin' on Heaven's Door" (1992) | "Yesterdays" (1992) | "Civil War" (1993) |

Music video
- "Yesterdays" on YouTube

"Yesterdays" is a song by the American hard rock band Guns N' Roses, which appears as the third track on their fourth studio album, Use Your Illusion II (1991). It was written by the band's vocalist, Axl Rose, with American musicians West Arkeen, Del James and Billy McCloud. The song is featured in the 2004 compilation album Greatest Hits, while a live version from Las Vegas was included as the single's B-side and on the 1999 live album Live Era '87–'93.

It was released as the album's third single on November 2, 1992, reaching number eight on the UK Singles Chart and numbers 58 and 72 on the US Cash Box Top 100 and Billboard Hot 100 charts.

== Composition ==
"Yesterday" has been described as combining the "rancorous blues-rock" of the band's debut studio album, Appetite for Destruction," with the "high-brow art-rock" of the rest of Use Your Ilusion I and Use Your Illusion II. Slash's arpeggiated guitar chords recall the intro of "Paradise City," while Axl Rose's piano chords and Dizzy Reed's organ work highlights the band's new direction.

== Music video ==
The music video of the song was directed by Andy Morahan. Filmed in black and white, the first version featured the band playing in an empty warehouse. The second version mixes clips of the band playing in the warehouse and photographs of band members during the Use Your Illusion Tour, as well as former members Izzy Stradlin and Steven Adler, who had left the group by then. It is included on their Welcome to the Videos DVD.

== Track listings ==
UK 7-inch vinyl (GEFS)
| No. | Title | Writer(s) | Length |
|---|---|---|---|
| 1. | "Yesterdays" (LP version) |
| 2. | "November Rain" (LP version) | Axl Rose |

UK 12-inch picture disc vinyl (GEFST)
| No. | Title | Writer(s) | Length |
|---|---|---|---|
| 1. | "Yesterdays" (LP version) |
| 2. | "November Rain" (LP version) | Rose |
| 3. | "Yesterdays" (Live in Las Vegas) |

UK and Korea CD (GEFSTD)
| No. | Title | Writer(s) | Length |
|---|---|---|---|
| 1. | "Yesterdays" (LP version) |
| 2. | "November Rain" (LP version) | Rose |
| 3. | "Yesterdays" (Live in Las Vegas) |
| 4. | "Knockin' on Heaven's Door" (Live at the Marquee in 1987 [previously released on Guns N' Roses (EP)]) | Bob Dylan |

== Personnel ==
- W. Axl Rose – lead vocals, piano
- Slash – lead guitar
- Izzy Stradlin – rhythm guitar
- Duff McKagan – bass guitar
- Matt Sorum – drums
- Dizzy Reed – organ

== Charts ==
=== Weekly charts ===
| Chart (1992) | Peak position |
|---|---|
| Australia (ARIA) | 14 |
| Austria (Ö3 Austria Top 40) | 18 |
| Belgium (Ultratop 50 Flanders) | 27 |
| Canada Top Singles (RPM) | 52 |
| Denmark (IFPI) | 6 |
| Europe (Eurochart Hot 100) | 14 |
| Finland (Suomen virallinen lista) | 22 |
| Germany (GfK) | 23 |
| Ireland (IRMA) | 5 |
| Netherlands (Dutch Top 40) | 6 |
| Netherlands (Single Top 100) | 7 |
| New Zealand (Recorded Music NZ) | 7 |
| Norway (VG-lista) | 5 |
| Portugal (AFP) | 8 |
| Sweden (Sverigetopplistan) | 16 |
| Switzerland (Schweizer Hitparade) | 19 |
| UK Singles (Official Charts) | 8 |
| UK Airplay (Music Week) | 15 |
| US Billboard Hot 100 | 72 |
| US Mainstream Rock Airplay (Billboard) | 13 |
| US Cash Box Top 100 | 58 |

=== Year-end charts ===
| Chart (1992) | Position |
|---|---|
| Netherlands (Dutch Top 40) | 87 |

== Release history ==
| Region | Date | Format(s) | Label(s) | Ref. |
|---|---|---|---|---|
| Australia | November 2, 1992 | CD; cassette | Geffen | |
| United Kingdom | November 9, 1992 | 7-inch vinyl; CD; cassette | Geffen | |
| United Kingdom | November 16, 1992 | 12-inch vinyl | Geffen | |
| Japan | December 16, 1992 | CD | Geffen | |
