= Patience (Guns N' Roses song) =

1989 single by Guns N' Roses

- Standard artwork (U.S. vinyl pictured)

Single by Guns N' Roses

from the album G N' R Lies
- B-side: "Rocket Queen"
- Released: March 31, 1989
- Recorded: July 29, 1987
- Studio: Take One Studio, Burbank, CA
- Genre: Acoustic rock; folk rock
- Length: 5:56
- Label: Geffen
- Songwriters: Axl Rose; Izzy Stradlin
- Producers: Guns N' Roses; Mike Clink

Guns N' Roses singles chronology
"Paradise City" (1989)	"Patience" (1989)	"Nightrain" (1989)

Music video
- Patience on YouTube

"Patience" is a song by American hard rock band Guns N' Roses from their second studio album, G N' R Lies (1988), released as a single in March 1989. The song peaked at number four on the US Billboard Hot 100. The song is a ballad, played using three acoustic guitars and was recorded in a single session by producer Mike Clink. A music video of the song was shot and appears on the band's music video DVD, Welcome to the Videos.

According to bass guitarist Duff McKagan, "Axl came up with a great idea for "Patience", seemingly out of nowhere", which became "the story and melody of that song". Drummer Steven Adler did not record on the track, although in some live performances prior to release of the album, such as their performance at the Orange County Fair in New York in the summer of 1988, percussion (and electric instruments) were used.

== Music video ==
In the video, the band members are situated in a hotel where they are the only constant images, as all other people are present for a moment, then fade away. Directed by Nigel Dick, it was one of the numerous videos produced by the band. The video was filmed on Valentine's Day during 1989, some scenes being shot at the Record Plant. It was the last video in which Steven Adler appeared (even though he did not play on the recorded track) and the last before the Use Your Illusion videos. Mike Clink is also featured in the video, sitting at the mixing board. The video was shot in The Ambassador Hotel, made famous due to Bobby Kennedy's assassination in 1968. The hotel was inoperative and scheduled for demolition, but was not demolished until 2006.

== Legacy and covers ==
The song is considered a classic hard rock ballad.

Rock musician Chris Cornell recorded a cover of the song, which was released posthumously on July 20, 2020.

== Live performances ==
"Patience" has been a staple in Guns N' Roses' setlists on all tours since the song was released. When performed live, electric guitars are often used instead of acoustic. Despite the album version of the song featuring no drumming, the drummers make active use of their drum kits during performances, and keyboardist Dizzy Reed makes use of his keyboard as well. In the 21st century, the band's lead guitarist (Slash or DJ Ashba) would play electric guitar, while the second guitarist (Buckethead, Paul Tobias, Richard Fortus, Bumblefoot or Duff McKagan) would play acoustic. Live performances are available on Appetite for Democracy 3D and Made in Stoke 24/7/11.

- The band performed the song live at the American Music Awards filmed at the Shrine Auditorium. Steven Adler was in rehab at the time of filming, and Don Henley filled in for him during the taping.

== Track listings ==
All tracks are written by Guns N' Roses.

US and UK 7-inch single (7-22996; GEF 56)
No.	Title	Length
1.	"Patience" (LP version)	5:56
2.	"Rocket Queen" (LP version)	6:13

UK 12-inch and mini-CD single (GEF 56T; GEF 56CD)
No.	Title	Length
1.	"Patience" (LP version)	5:56
2.	"Rocket Queen" (LP version)	6:13
3.	"Interview with W. Axl Rose" (recorded in Los Angeles 19 May 1989)	7:44

== Personnel ==
- W. Axl Rose – lead vocals, whistling
- Slash – lead acoustic guitar
- Izzy Stradlin – rhythm acoustic guitar, backing vocals
- Duff McKagan – rhythm acoustic guitar, backing vocals
- Steven Adler - backing vocals

== Charts ==
=== Weekly charts ===
Chart (1989–1990)	Peak position
Australia (ARIA)	16
Belgium (Ultratop 50 Flanders)	9
Finland (The Official Finnish Charts)	8
Ireland (IRMA)	2
Netherlands (Dutch Top 40)	4
Netherlands (Single Top 100)	3
New Zealand (Recorded Music NZ)	4
Switzerland (Schweizer Hitparade)	16
UK Singles (OCC)	10
US Billboard Hot 100	4
US Mainstream Rock (Billboard)	7
West Germany (GfK)	38

=== Chris Cornell cover ===
Chart (2020)	Peak position
US Rock & Alternative Airplay (Billboard)	4
US Hot Rock & Alternative Songs (Billboard)	17

=== Year-end charts ===
Chart (1989)	Position
Australia (ARIA)	56
Belgium (Ultratop Flanders)	75
Netherlands (Dutch Top 40)	24
Netherlands (Single Top 100)	24
US Billboard Hot 100	71

=== Chris Cornell cover ===
Chart (2020)	Position
US Rock Airplay (Billboard)	27
US Hot Rock & Alternative Songs (Billboard)	72

== Certifications ==
Region	Certification	Certified units/sales
Australia (ARIA)	Gold	35,000^{^}
Brazil (Pro-Música Brasil)	2× Platinum	120,000^{‡}
Italy (FIMI)	Gold	50,000^{‡}
United Kingdom (BPI)	Silver	200,000^{‡}
United States (RIAA)	Gold	500,000^{^}
^{^} Shipments figures based on certification alone.^{‡} Sales+streaming figures based on certification alone.

== Release history ==
Region	Date	Format(s)	Label(s)	Ref.
United States	March 31, 1989	7-inch vinyl; cassette	Geffen	
United Kingdom	June 19, 1989	7-inch vinyl; 12-inch vinyl; CD; cassette	Geffen	

== See also ==
- List of glam metal albums and songs
