= "The Spaghetti Incident?" =

1993 studio album by Guns N' Roses

Studio album of cover songs by Guns N' Roses
- Released: November 23, 1993
- Recorded: 1990–1993
- Studios: A&M Studios; Record Plant Studios; Rumbo Recorders; Can-Am Recorders; Sound Techniques; Triad Studios; Conway Recording Studios; Ocean Way Recording (Los Angeles)
- Genres: Hard rock; punk rock
- Length: 46:03
- Label: Geffen
- Producers: Mike Clink; Guns N' Roses; Duff McKagan; Jim Mitchell

Guns N' Roses chronology
Garden of Eden: Strictly Limited Edition (1993)	"The Spaghetti Incident?" (1993)	Use Your Illusion (1998)

Singles from "The Spaghetti Incident?"
- 1. "Ain't It Fun" Released: November 1993; 2. "Since I Don't Have You" Released: February 1994

"The Spaghetti Incident?" is the fifth studio album by the American hard rock band Guns N' Roses. The album is composed of covers of older songs mostly in the punk rock and hard rock genres. "The Spaghetti Incident?" is the only studio album to feature rhythm guitarist Gilby Clarke, who replaced original Guns N' Roses member Izzy Stradlin (some of Stradlin's parts are on the album) during the band's Use Your Illusion Tour in 1991, as well as the last album to feature guitarist Slash, bassist Duff McKagan, and drummer Matt Sorum, following their departures in 1996 and 1997, respectively (though Slash and McKagan later returned in 2016). It is also their final album to date featuring longtime producer Mike Clink.

It is the only Guns N' Roses album release not backed by a tour. Although generally well received critically, it is the band's worst-selling studio album, having sold one million copies in the United States by 2018.

== Background ==
Initially, the band planned to release an EP of covers in 1992 or 1993; however, they decided to record a full album instead.

To sort of alleviate the pressure of being in the studio, and trying to get the new songs recorded, and all the other fuckin' barrage of fuckin' hassles that go into making a record, we would just get together and jam on old songs, to sort of loosen up. And we ended up recording four songs. And we thought this would make a great EP... So we kept the four songs, finished Use Your Illusions, went out on the road. Then, somewhere along the line, we started recording more of them – in between gigs and stuff – and, at the very end of it, we had 13 songs.

— Slash

Many of the tracks were recorded during the same sessions as the Illusions albums, which were intended to produce three or four albums. Izzy Stradlin's guitar parts were reportedly re-recorded entirely by Gilby Clarke. (Note: Clarke later disputed the claim, stating "Izzy didn't play on a lot of them, so I got to just put my parts on songs that were recorded. So it was a little bit of both.") Slash described the recording as "spontaneous and unpainted", and recording the songs served as "a purpose to alleviate the pressure of making the Illusions records". The band wanted to increase the profile of some of their favorite bands and help them financially via royalties with the tracklist selection, and considered naming the album "Pension Fund". Rose concedes that the proposed title was because the group were "helping these guys pay some rent". Speaking to an interviewer, Rose related the album's motives: "Some of those songs I liked, I got ridiculed and criticized for at the time those songs were out. So, it was kinda like, well, now maybe some of those people will listen to it. It's the energy and the defiance that punk rock had and that it didn't really hit the mainstream all that much. And we are, whether we like it or not, in some ways in the mainstream, so we've got to bring certain songs to people's attention."

The album is a collection of punk and glam rock covers. The album features songs by punk artists such as U.K. Subs, The Damned, New York Dolls, The Stooges, Dead Boys, Misfits, Johnny Thunders, The Professionals, FEAR, as well as T. Rex, Soundgarden and The Skyliners. Of the Sex Pistols song "Black Leather", Slash remarked, "I thought we did a much better version than him [Pistols guitarist Steve Jones]. That's the only song I can say that about." The record has a more scaled-back sound than Use Your Illusion I and II (both 1991); Entertainment Weekly wrote that this was evidence that the group "aims to prove it doesn't need two padded CDs, a horn section and a bevy of backup singers to make a joyful racket".

The lead single, "Ain't It Fun" featured Hanoi Rocks singer Michael Monroe as a guest vocalist.

During the sessions, the band recorded instrumental tracks for "Beer and a Cigarette", originally by Hanoi Rocks. The vocals were not recorded and the song was left off the record because the band did not want songwriter Andy McCoy to receive money. The band also did an instrumental version of "Down on the Street" by The Stooges. This too went unreleased.

== Title and artwork ==
The title references an incident Steven Adler had in 1989 while the band was temporarily staying at an apartment in Chicago. Adler stored his drugs in a refrigerator next to the band's takeout containers, which contained Italian food. McKagan explained that Adler's code word for his stash was "spaghetti". In his lawsuit against the band, Adler's lawyer asked the band to "tell us about the spaghetti incident", which the band found amusing and used as the title of the album.

At the bottom of the album cover, a message is written in a code created by the Zodiac Killer. Years later, it was decoded as reading "Fuck 'Em All".

== Controversy ==
The album includes a hidden track, a cover of "Look at Your Game, Girl", originally by cult leader Charles Manson. The track was kept secret and left off advance tapes sent to reviewers. The inclusion of the song caused controversy, with law enforcement and victims' rights groups expressing outrage. Rose stated "...we wanted to downplay it. We don't give any credit to Charles Manson on the album". Label president David Geffen commented, "[If] Rose had realized how offensive people would find this, he would not have ever recorded this song." Slash mentioned that the song was "done with naive and innocent black humor on our part". Rose stated he would donate all performance royalties from the song to a nonprofit environmental organization. The band was planning to remove the song before learning that royalties would be donated to the son of one of Manson's victims. Geffen Records stated their share of royalties would be donated to the Doris Tate Crime Victims Bureau.

== Live performances ==
Although Guns N' Roses never toured in support of "The Spaghetti Incident?", some of the songs were performed live prior to its release. The first track, "Since I Don't Have You", was performed a few times as an intro to songs "Sweet Child o' Mine" or "Paradise City" in 1992 and 1993. "Down on the Farm" was performed once in its full length during the band's 1990 performance at Farm Aid IV. The band later played the track a few times during the Chinese Democracy Tour in 2006. They also played it during their 2023 World Tour, including their headline slot at The Glastonbury Festival, on June 24, 2023. This was a nod to literally performing on a farm. On May 27, 2025, "Human Being" was performed live by the band for the first time in their career. The band performed "Hair of the Dog" once in 1988, and again in 1990, during the only known performance by "The Gak" (a band featuring members of Guns N' Roses, Metallica and Skid Row). "Attitude" was performed frequently during the Use Your Illusion Tour and the Not in This Lifetime... Tour, and McKagan played it with his side project Loaded and his solo career. Other songs played live by McKagan are "New Rose", "You Can't Put Your Arms Around a Memory" and "Raw Power".

The other songs were never played live by Guns N' Roses, but might have been played by some of the members' side projects, like Matt Sorum's supergroup Camp Freddy, which plays cover versions of famous songs, as well as Neurotic Outsiders, the supergroup Duff McKagan and Matt Sorum were part of. Guns N' Roses played "Attitude" and—for the first time—"Raw Power" live in Buenos Aires, Argentina, in April 2014 with Duff McKagan on vocals. "Raw Power" and "New Rose" were played during the Not in This Lifetime... Tour. As of 2026, many of the album's songs have been played sporadically over the decade since the band reunited, with "Down on the Farm" being the most played, and "Human Being" and "Black Leather" receiving their live debuts.

== Commercial performance and reception ==
Professional ratings
Review scores
Source	Rating
AllMusic	2/5 stars
Calgary Herald	B+
Entertainment Weekly	A−
Music Week	5/5 stars
NME	7/10
Q	3/5 stars
Rolling Stone	3.5/5 stars
Select	2/5 medals
The Village Voice	A−
Vox	6/10

"The Spaghetti Incident?" debuted at No. 4 on the Billboard 200, selling about 190,000 albums in its first week of release, significantly fewer than their previous releases. The album was certified platinum by RIAA on January 26, 1994. Slash contends that the album was "killed" in the US by the controversy surrounding "Look at Your Game, Girl", especially as "everybody in LA and who was 30 or older was in complete upheaval. Not to mention David Geffen, who said, 'Don't work the record'." The album reached No. 2 on the UK Albums Chart, behind Meat Loaf's Bat Out of Hell II: Back Into Hell.

Reviews of the album in the specialist press were cautious, with Kerrang! deemed the album to be "average". Caren Myers of Melody Maker dismissed the band's desire for credibility and their determination to "impress their authentic punky pedigree" on listeners, resulting in a "hideously sincere effort to honour their roots" that instead reveals "how little they understand them". For Select critic Clark Collis, the group's method of "disinterring...punk classics and subjecting them to the old GN'R treatment" meant recording faithful covers but with extra guitar riffs, resulting in the overall impression of "pub-rockery gone mad". Roger Morton of NME wrote that the knee-jerk reaction to a "Guns N' Roses-go-punk LP" would be to compare it to "George Michael [going] busking", but conceded that it works on a "primal, inebriated, reptilian brain level" and noted how the choice of covers "zig-zags from the obscure to the predictable to the preposterous", resulting in "a bizarre mixture of swagger, nihilism and bad attitood which is as funny as it is exhilarating".

Describing "The Spaghetti Incident?" as "an album of mostly punky cover versions of drunkrock classics", Rolling Stone reviewer Jonathan Gold commented that the album was the band's attempt to "reassert their roots in hard-edged rock & roll — some punk rock, some not — the way that U2 tried to with Rattle and Hum when their 'authenticity' had become suspect. But in recording half an album's worth of punk-rock songs, Guns n' Roses reveal themselves as a glam-rock band, and a good one, as if T. Rex and the Dolls had come out of early punk rather than the other way around." Robert Christgau praised the album in The Village Voice, highlighting the unlikeliness of Fear, UK Subs and Nazareth songs belonging on the same record and quipping: "As someone who never thought punk had much to do with musicianship or musicianship much to do with GN'R, I remain impressed even with the excitement worn off."

Some critics contextualized the material more broadly; Eric Weisbard wrote in Spin that the band's choice of covers demonstrated their belief that "early-'70s metal and its sworn enemy, punk rock, were essentially the same beast, connected through glam and testosterone", and added that while this view was unradical in the wake of grunge, the group's move from metal to punk "took more guts and imagination than Seattle's reverse". Deeming the album an "exercise in nostalgia", Simon Reynolds opined in The New York Times that, by covering punk songs, Guns N' Roses was not only paying respects to bands that influenced them but was "trying to rewrite its place in rock history as a descendant of punk as opposed to heavy metal".

In his retrospective review for AllMusic, music critic Stephen Thomas Erlewine said that, "As punk albums go, "The Spaghetti Incident?" lacks righteous anger and rage. As Guns N' Roses albums go, it's a complete delight, returning to the ferocious, hard-rocking days of Appetite for Destruction." Classic Rock's Howard Johnson finds that only eight of the thirteen songs could be loosely considered punk, with the remaining cuts revealing Guns N' Roses' "traditional eclecticism" by covering songs by hard rock, grunge and doo-wop bands, meaning "that's where the punk rock really exists on The Spaghetti Incident? – in attitude more than music." Johnson believes the album has "stood the test of time rather well" and that its energetic sound showed how the band avoiding becoming "bloated by the sheer enormity of their success". In The Virgin Encyclopedia of Popular Music (1997), Colin Larkin calls it a "much vaunted collection of covers with a punk foundation" that is nonetheless a "perfunctory affair" mostly notable for the Charles Manson cover and for "lining the pockets of several long-forgotten musicians" like UK Subs, Nazareth, Misfits and Fear. In The Rough Guide to Rock (1999), Essi Berelian deemed it a "trawl through the band's personal record collections" and an "interesting insight" into their influences, chiefly worth hearing for Rose's "hilarious attempt at an English accent" on "Down on the Farm".

== Legacy ==
"The reviews that greeted The Spaghetti Incident? upon its release in November 1993 veered between the perplexed and the hostile. It sold just a million copies in the US – small change next to Appetite For Destruction, but enough to boost both the profile and the bank balance of those who wrote the songs that GN'R had covered on it."

— Dave Everley, Classic Rock (2024)

Dave Everley of Classic Rock credits "The Spaghetti Incident?" for "[bringing] a load of mostly obscure, mostly punk-rock tracks to a wider audience", and comments that it was "a curve ball from one of the biggest rock bands on the planet". The Guns N' Roses cover of "Ain't It Fun" revived the fortunes of the Dead Boys; as the song's co-writer Gene "Cheetah Chrome" O'Connor later explained: "At that point, the Dead Boys were kind of becoming a footnote. At the time, it was kind of nice that somebody actually remembered us. ... Having your song on a Guns N' Roses album is a considerable chunk of change. I moved down to Nashville, got resettled down there and was able to live and not work for a while. Definitely turned my life around a little bit. It got me through a rough time." Duff McKagan, who was the central inspiration behind The Spaghetti Incident?, released his first solo album Believe in Me in the same season as "The Spaghetti Incident?".

In 2025, Uncut ranked "The Spaghetti Incident?" at number 141 in their list of "The 200 Greatest Heavy Rock Albums". The editors wrote that, regardless of whether the album is "best deemed as a bid for critical reassessment or a cavalier stopgap", the "enjoyably messy" record is, amid slim competition, the group's most satisfying release since Use Your Illusion.

== Track listing ==
No.	Title	Writer(s)	Original artist	Length
1.	"Since I Don't Have You"	Joseph Rock, James Beaumont, Jackie Taylor, Janet Vogel, Joe Verscharen, Lennie Martin, and Wally Lester	The Skyliners	4:20
2.	"New Rose"	Brian James	The Damned	2:38
3.	"Down on the Farm"	Alvin Gibbs, Charlie Harper, Nicholas Garratt	U.K. Subs	3:29
4.	"Human Being"	Johnny Thunders, David Johansen	New York Dolls	6:48
5.	"Raw Power"	Iggy Pop, James Williamson	The Stooges	3:12
6.	"Ain't It Fun" (featuring Michael Monroe)	Cheetah Chrome, Peter Laughner	Dead Boys	5:06
7.	"Buick Makane (Big Dumb Sex)"	Marc Bolan / Chris Cornell	T. Rex / Soundgarden	2:40
8.	"Hair of the Dog"	Dan McCafferty, Pete Agnew, Manny Charlton, Darrell Sweet	Nazareth	3:55
9.	"Attitude"	Glenn Danzig	Misfits	1:27
10.	"Black Leather"	Steve Jones	Sex Pistols	4:09
11.	"You Can't Put Your Arms Around a Memory"	Johnny Thunders	Johnny Thunders	3:35
12.	"I Don't Care About You"	Lee Ving	Fear	2:17
13.	"Look at Your Game, Girl" (hidden track starting at 2:17 of track 12)	Charles Manson	Charles Manson	2:34
Total length:				46:03

== Personnel ==
Credits are adapted from the album's liner notes.

Guns N' Roses

- W. Axl Rose – lead vocals, keyboards on "Since I Don't Have You", kazoo on "Human Being"
- Slash – lead guitar, co-lead vocals on "Buick Mackane (Big Dumb Sex)", talkbox on "Hair of the Dog", backing vocals on "Attitude"
- Duff McKagan – bass, backing vocals, acoustic guitar, lead vocals on "You Can't Put Your Arms Around a Memory", "New Rose" and "Attitude", co-lead vocals on "Raw Power", drums on "You Can't Put Your Arms Around A Memory", production
- Matt Sorum – drums, percussion on "Hair of the Dog", backing vocals on "Human Being" and "Attitude"
- Dizzy Reed – keyboards, piano on "Since I Don't Have You", percussion on "Look at Your Game Girl", backing vocals on "You Can't Put Your Arms Around a Memory"
- Gilby Clarke – rhythm guitar, backing vocals except on "You Can't Put Your Arms Around a Memory" & "Look At Your Game, Girl"

Production

- Mike Clink – production on all tracks except 1 and 11
- Jim Mitchell – production on track 11
- Bill Price – mixing
- George Marino – mastering
- Kevin Reagan – art direction; graphic design
- Dennis Keeley, Gene Kirkland & Robert John – photography

Additional musicians

- Michael Monroe – co-lead vocals on "Ain't It Fun"
- Mike Staggs – additional guitar on "Ain't It Fun"
- Mike Fasano – percussion on "Hair of the Dog"
- Eddie Huletz – backing vocals on "You Can't Put Your Arms Around a Memory"
- Blake Stanton – backing vocals on "I Don't Care About You"
- Eric Mills – backing vocals on "I Don't Care About You"
- Rikki Rachtman – backing vocals on "I Don't Care About You"
- Stuart Bailey – backing vocals on "I Don't Care About You"
- Carlos Booy – acoustic guitar on "Look at Your Game, Girl"
- Izzy Stradlin – rhythm guitar, vocals on "Black Leather", "I Don't Care About You", "New Rose", "Attitude", and "Down on the Farm" (uncredited)

== Charts ==
=== Weekly charts ===
Chart (1993)	Peak position
Australian Albums (ARIA)	1
Austrian Albums (Ö3 Austria)	4
Dutch Albums (Album Top 100)	4
German Albums (Offizielle Top 100)	5
Hungarian Albums (MAHASZ)	3
New Zealand Albums (RMNZ)	3
Norwegian Albums (VG-lista)	2
Spanish Albums (AFYVE)	2
Swedish Albums (Sverigetopplistan)	2
Swiss Albums (Schweizer Hitparade)	3
UK Albums (Official Charts)	2
US Billboard 200	4

=== Year-end charts ===
Chart (1993)	Position
Australian Albums (ARIA)	29
Dutch Albums (Album Top 100)	37

Chart (1994)	Position
Dutch Albums (Album Top 100)	67
German Albums (Offizielle Top 100)	56
Swiss Albums (Schweizer Hitparade)	48
US Billboard 200	61

== Certifications ==
Region	Certification	Certified units/sales
Australia (ARIA)	Platinum	70,000^{^}
Austria (IFPI Austria)	Gold	25,000^{*}
Brazil (Pro-Música Brasil)	Platinum	250,000^{*}
Canada (Music Canada)	3× Platinum	300,000^{^}
Finland (Musiikkituottajat)	Gold	33,935
France (SNEP)	2× Gold	200,000^{*}
Germany (BVMI)	Gold	250,000^{^}
Italy (FIMI) since 2009	Gold	25,000^{*}
Japan (RIAJ)	Platinum	200,000^{^}
Netherlands (NVPI)	Platinum	100,000^{^}
New Zealand (RMNZ)	Platinum	15,000^{^}
Norway (IFPI Norway)	Platinum	50,000^{*}
Spain (Promusicae)	Platinum	100,000^{^}
Sweden (GLF)	Platinum	100,000^{^}
Switzerland (IFPI Switzerland)	Gold	25,000^{^}
United Kingdom (BPI)	Gold	100,000^{^}
United States (RIAA)	Platinum	1,000,000^{^}
^{*} Sales figures based on certification alone.^{^} Shipments figures based on certification alone.

== See also ==
- List of number-one albums in Australia during the 1990s
