= You Could Be Mine =

1991 single by Guns N' Roses

- CD single

Single by Guns N' Roses

from the album Use Your Illusion II
- B-side: "Civil War"
- Released: June 25, 1991
- Studio: A&M (Hollywood); Record Plant (Los Angeles); Studio 56 (Los Angeles); Image Recording (Hollywood); Conway (Los Angeles); Metalworks (Mississauga, Ontario)
- Genre: Hard rock; heavy metal
- Length: 5:44
- Label: Geffen; Uzi Suicide
- Songwriters: Axl Rose; Izzy Stradlin
- Producers: Mike Clink; Guns N' Roses

Guns N' Roses singles chronology
"Nightrain" (1989)	"You Could Be Mine" (1991)	"Don't Cry" (1991)

Music videos
- "You Could Be Mine" on YouTube
- "You Could Be Mine" (Live) on YouTube

"You Could Be Mine" is a song by the American rock band Guns N' Roses from their fourth album, Use Your Illusion II (1991). The song was released on June 25, 1991, as the first single from the album. The song was also included in the 1991 science fiction action film Terminator 2: Judgment Day. Backed with "Civil War", also from Use Your Illusion II, the single reached number 29 on the US Billboard Hot 100, number three on the UK Singles Chart, and number one in Finland and Spain. It became a top-five hit in more than 10 additional countries.

== History ==
Slash states that the song's writing began at the first preproduction session for Appetite for Destruction. "You Could Be Mine" was selected to be included in the James Cameron film Terminator 2: Judgment Day. Arnold Schwarzenegger had the band members over for dinner at his home to negotiate the deal.

== Composition ==
"You Could Be Mine" was described by Sam Law of Kerrang! as "unchained hard rock", and by Greg Prato of Ultimate Guitar as exemplifying the band's primary hard rock and heavy metal sound.

== Music video ==
The music video for the song was directed by Andy Morahan, Stan Winston and Jeffrey Abelson. A T-800 Terminator is assembled, given the appearance of Arnold Schwarzenegger, and dispatched to assassinate the band at one of their concerts. The video consists of clips from the movie, including its teaser trailer, intercut with footage of the band performing the song as the T-800 makes his way to the front of the crowd. After the song ends, he confronts the band as they leave the venue through a back door and analyzes each member individually; Izzy Stradlin is absent at this point, replaced by keyboardist Dizzy Reed. The T-800 scans Axl Rose last and concludes that killing the band would be a "Waste of Ammo". Lowering his shotgun, he gives Rose a brief smirk and walks away.

As the video features clips from the movie, it could not be put on the DVD Welcome to the Videos due to licensing issues. The video was also not included on any of the DVD releases of Terminator 2: Judgment Day, although it was included with a special double tape edition of the film, released on VHS in 1993.

On October 6, 2022, a music video of "You Could Be Mine", with only a mix of scenes from a concert in New York at the Ritz Theatre recorded on May 16, 1991, was released to promote the Use Your Illusion (Super Deluxe Edition) box set.

== Other usage ==
The song was featured in Terminator Salvation during the scene where John Connor tries to hijack a Moto-Terminator. It also includes direct references to the film.

== Track listings ==
- 7-inch single (GEFS7-19039)
1. "You Could Be Mine" (LP version) – 5:48
2. "Civil War" (LP version) – 7:38
- European CD single (GED 19039)
1. "You Could Be Mine" (LP version) – 5:48
2. "Civil War" (LP version) – 7:58

== Personnel ==
- W. Axl Rose – lead vocals
- Slash – lead guitar, rhythm guitar
- Izzy Stradlin – rhythm guitar, backing vocals
- Duff McKagan – bass, backing vocals
- Matt Sorum – drums

== Charts ==
=== Weekly charts ===
Chart (1991)	Peak position
Australia (ARIA)	3
Austria (Ö3 Austria Top 40)	8
Belgium (Ultratop 50 Flanders)	10
Canada Top Singles (RPM)	30
Canada Retail Singles (The Record)	3
Denmark (IFPI)	2
Europe (Eurochart Hot 100)	2
Finland (Suomen virallinen lista)	1
France (SNEP)	8
Germany (GfK)	5
Greece (IFPI)	6
Ireland (IRMA)	2
Italy (Musica e dischi)	2
Japan (Oricon)	23
Luxembourg (Radio Luxembourg)	9
Netherlands (Dutch Top 40)	5
Netherlands (Single Top 100)	4
New Zealand (Recorded Music NZ)	2
Norway (VG-lista)	2
Portugal (AFP)	3
Spain (AFYVE)	1
Sweden (Sverigetopplistan)	2
Switzerland (Schweizer Hitparade)	2
UK Singles (Official Charts)	3
UK Airplay (Music Week)	48
US Billboard Hot 100	29
US Mainstream Rock (Billboard)	3

=== Year-end charts ===
Chart (1991)	Position
Australia (ARIA)	5
Belgium (Ultratop)	54
Germany (Media Control)	27
Netherlands (Dutch Top 40)	36
Netherlands (Single Top 100)	32
New Zealand (RIANZ)	4
Sweden (Topplistan)	4
Switzerland (Schweizer Hitparade)	8
UK Singles (OCC)	50

== Certifications ==
Region	Certification	Certified units/sales
Australia (ARIA)	Platinum	70,000^{^}
Japan (RIAJ)	Gold	50,000^{^}
New Zealand (RMNZ)	Platinum	10,000^{*}
Sweden (GLF)	Gold	25,000^{^}
United Kingdom (BPI)	Silver	200,000^{‡}
United States (RIAA)	Gold	500,000^{^}
^{*} Sales figures based on certification alone.^{^} Shipments figures based on certification alone.^{‡} Sales+streaming figures based on certification alone.

== Release history ==
Region	Date	Format(s)	Label(s)	Ref.
United States	June 25, 1991	Cassette	Geffen; Uzi Suicide	
United Kingdom	July 1, 1991	7-inch vinyl; 12-inch vinyl; CD; cassette	Geffen; Uzi Suicide	
Japan	July 21, 1991	Mini-CD	Geffen	
