= Civil War (song) =

1990 song by Guns N' Roses

Single by Guns N' Roses

from the album Nobody's Child: Romanian Angel Appeal and Use Your Illusion II
- B-side: "Garden of Eden" (LP version) (German); "Exclusive Interview with Slash" (German)
- Released: May 3, 1993
- Recorded: 1990
- Genre: Hard rock; progressive rock
- Length: 7:40
- Label: Geffen; Uzi Suicide
- Songwriters: Axl Rose; Slash; Duff McKagan
- Producers: Mike Clink; Guns N' Roses

Guns N' Roses singles chronology
"Yesterdays" (1992)	"Civil War" (1993)	"Ain't It Fun" (1993)

"Civil War" is a song by American hard rock band Guns N' Roses, written by Axl Rose, Slash and Duff McKagan. A protest song on war, it refers to all war as "civil war" and states that war only "feeds the rich while it buries the poor". In the song, Rose asks, "What's so civil about war, anyway?" It opens with a sample from the film Cool Hand Luke and a whistled folk melody.

The band first performed "Civil War" at Farm Aid in April 1990. It first appeared on the 1990 charity compilation Nobody's Child: Romanian Angel Appeal, peaking at number four on the US Album Rock Tracks chart (now the Mainstream Rock chart), before opening the band's 1991 album Use Your Illusion II. It was the first song recorded with keyboardist Dizzy Reed and the only song on the Use Your Illusion albums to feature drummer Steven Adler.

Released as a single worldwide in 1993, "Civil War" reached number two in Spain and charted in Australia, Belgium, the Netherlands, Norway, and New Zealand; in the United Kingdom and Ireland it was instead released on The "Civil War" EP, which reached numbers 11 and 15 respectively. While some critics have found its lyrics simplistic, the song's arrangement has been widely praised, and retrospective rankings frequently place it among the band's best. It remains a regular part of the band's live set.

== Background and writing ==
"Civil War" was written by Guns N' Roses members Axl Rose, Slash, and Duff McKagan. Slash has said that the song began as an instrumental he wrote shortly before the band left for the Japanese leg of its Appetite for Destruction world tour; Rose wrote the lyrics, and it was worked into a full song at a soundcheck in Melbourne, Australia. According to Classic Rock, the band had been playing the riff at soundchecks and drilled it into shape before two shows in Australia in December 1988.

In a September 27, 1993, interview on Rockline, McKagan explained where the lyrics' reference to Martin Luther King came from:

I went in a peace march, when I was a little kid, with my mom. I was like four years old. For Martin Luther King. And that's when: "Did you wear the black arm band when they shot the man who said: 'Peace could last forever'?" It's just true-life experiences, really.

Rose has said that the lyrics were inspired by a man he knew as Riad, who had briefly been a brother-in-law of Rose's ex Erin Everly. Rose described Riad as being of part-Lebanese descent and a former student of Pepperdine University, who claimed to be an international arms dealer and billionaire with ambitions of being "King of the World", as well as an expert in military strategy and global finance. Rose wrote that Riad was the inspiration for "Civil War", which was written at his request as a song about how gullible people were and how readily they could be sold anything because of their appetite for killing one another. Riad also inspired the later song "Riad N' The Bedouins".

== Recording ==
Guns N' Roses began recording what would become the Use Your Illusion albums in January 1990, starting with an attempt to capture "Civil War", a song the band had sketched out in 1988. The sessions immediately ran into difficulty because of Steven Adler's heroin addiction; according to Rolling Stone, he began nodding off at his drum kit, and Slash later said that Adler could not manage the drum parts and was not honest with his bandmates about getting clean. Adler has said that he was sick from opiate withdrawal during one session for the song and failed around twenty attempts to play it, while Slash and McKagan shouted at him.

After consulting lawyers, the band placed Adler on probation, and within months he was removed from the group altogether. He was dismissed on July 11, 1990. Slash had seen The Cult's Matt Sorum perform in April 1990 and recruited him as Adler's replacement. Keyboardist Dizzy Reed, whom Rose brought into the band around the same time, has said that "Civil War" was the first song he played on with Guns N' Roses. "Civil War" was Adler's only recorded contribution to the Use Your Illusion albums and the last Guns N' Roses track he played on. The song was produced by Mike Clink and the band.

== Composition and lyrics ==
=== Music ===
"Civil War" is built around a slow-building structure that runs just under eight minutes. It opens with a sample of Strother Martin's prison-warden speech from the 1967 film Cool Hand Luke, which includes the line "What we've got here is... failure to communicate", while Rose whistles "When Johnny Comes Marching Home", a song associated with the American Civil War; piano and Rose's vocals are accompanied by layered electric guitars. Slash's lead guitar and Adler's drums enter at roughly the 1:19 mark, at which point Rose shifts to a harsher, shouted delivery, and the song alternates between quiet verses and loud choruses for several more minutes. Rolling Stone noted that the acoustic-guitar opening gives way to amplified anger, with the song's central question accompanied by sound effects of thunder and rain. Paste wrote that acoustic guitar arpeggios from Slash and Izzy Stradlin are layered beneath large distorted chords, an approach it compared to the quiet–loud dynamics later used by grunge bands such as Nirvana and Soundgarden, and noted a double-time, barroom-style passage in the song's final two minutes. The closing section breaks down into a rolling piano line and riffing in the style of the Rolling Stones, accompanied by a thunderstorm sound effect and further whistling by Rose.

The song combines several styles and has been described as hard rock and progressive rock. Rolling Stone called it a seven-minute power ballad, while Louder described it as a heavy, brooding, epic anti-war protest song unlike anything on Appetite for Destruction and Classic Rock as the band's most detailed epic.

=== Lyrics ===
Lyrically, "Civil War" is an anti-war protest song. It describes war as profiting the wealthy while the poor pay the price, and accuses power-hungry leaders of treating soldiers as commodities. The Guardian summarized the song's argument as being that all war is civil war, since humanity is harming itself. The lyrics reference the Vietnam War and the assassinations of Martin Luther King Jr. and John F. Kennedy.

The song's final bridge, delivered rapidly by Rose, quotes a speech by a Peruvian Shining Path guerrilla officer describing a policy of "selective annihilation" of mayors and government officials in order to create a power vacuum, with the claim that peace comes closer as popular war advances.

== Release ==
"Civil War" made its live debut on April 7, 1990, at Farm Aid IV in Indianapolis, the band's first public performance in six months and the last with Adler. Rose introduced the song as "something new we got". Rolling Stone described the band's set as a disaster, with the performance of "Civil War" hampered by Adler's difficulty learning the song.

The studio recording first appeared in 1990 as Guns N' Roses' contribution to Nobody's Child: Romanian Angel Appeal, a charity compilation benefiting the Romanian Angel Appeal Foundation's efforts to help state orphanages in Romania as the country moved on from communist rule. In June 1991 it was issued as the B-side of the single "You Could Be Mine", a song that also appeared in the film Terminator 2: Judgment Day. "Civil War" then opened Use Your Illusion II, released on September 17, 1991, alongside Use Your Illusion I. Use Your Illusion II debuted at number one on the Billboard 200 with first-week sales of about 770,000 copies.

"Civil War" was released as an A-side single on May 3, 1993, the seventh single of the Use Your Illusion campaign and the fourth from Use Your Illusion II. Overseas editions of the single included additional album tracks and a March 1993 interview with Slash. In the United Kingdom and Ireland, the song was instead released on The "Civil War" EP.

== Critical reception ==
In his 1991 Rolling Stone review of Use Your Illusion II, Christian Wright wrote that "Civil War" turns away from the band's usual patriotism toward anger and a sober treatment of political betrayal. He felt that because the band was writing beyond its own experience, Rose's central question was "almost excusable". In NME, Mary Anne Hobbs was dismissive of both Use Your Illusion albums, citing the "slack political rhetoric" of "Civil War" as one example of lyrics she regarded as foolish. Robert Christgau gave Use Your Illusion II a "choice cuts" designation in his The Village Voice Consumer Guide, naming "Civil War" as its one standout track.

Retrospective assessments have generally been more favorable, though several qualify their praise by noting the lyrics' simplicity. In 2012, the Rock and Roll Hall of Fame named "Civil War" one of ten essential Guns N' Roses songs, describing it as a sweeping narrative about war whose audio samples added to its dramatic scale. In 2023, Classic Rock's Paul Rees ranked "Civil War" seventh on a list of the 50 greatest Guns N' Roses songs; he acknowledged that its anti-war message lacks nuance but called it the band's "most finely detailed epic", noting the layered arrangement and the extended coda. Writing for Uproxx in 2022, Steven Hyden placed it ninth on a list of his 40 favorite band songs and called it, alongside Metallica's "One", the best anti-war song of the Reagan–Bush years, arguing that the band's working-class audience was made up of the kind of people who fought such wars. The Guardian placed it tenth on its 2022 ranking of the band's 20 best songs, with Matt Mills praising its succession of climactic melodies and finding its central lyric amusingly pseudo-philosophical. Kerrang! ranked it 14th in 2020, describing it as an unusual protest song and a sincere high point of Use Your Illusion II. Ultimate Classic Rock ranked it second among the band's album openers, arguing that with its broad anti-war sentiment, it might have been a disaster but instead showed the scope of the band's new ambition. They later ranked it as the fourth best Guns N' Roses song, calling it the band's "deepest song, both musically and lyrically".

Others were more guarded. In a 2016 ranking of every Guns N' Roses song, Spin placed it 24th of 60, praising the opening whistling and sample and remarking that the song was, unfortunately, as timely as ever. Paste ranked it eighth in 2017. Bryan Rolli judged it a failure as a protest song, citing the vagueness of its criticism of a war that ended when the band members were barely teenagers, the naïveté of Rose's central question, and Rose's earlier controversy over the G N' R Lies track "One in a Million". As a rock song, however, he called it a "brilliant spectacle" and a rightful fan favorite. MetalSucks ranked it 23rd of 81 songs in 2022; Axl Rosenberg recalled that as a child Rose's central question had seemed like the cleverest thing he had ever heard, although even then he knew it made no sense. Jay Busbee of Cuepoint ranked it 11th of 80 songs in 2016; he dismissed the lyrics as "middle-school-level political commentary" but said the song's ambition showed the band aiming beyond its core audience. Writing in 2021, Gary Graff described it as one of the most notorious songs in the band's catalog and said its anti-war message remained as resonant as at its original release.

=== Rankings ===
Select rankings of "Civil War" among Guns N' Roses songs
Publication	List	Year	Rank	Ref.
Spin	"Every Guns N' Roses Song, Ranked"	2016	24	
LA Weekly	"The Ultimate Ranking of Every Guns N' Roses Song"	2016	11	
Cuepoint	"All 80 Guns N' Roses Songs, Ranked"	2016	11	
Paste	"The 15 Best Guns N' Roses Songs"	2017	8	
Kerrang!	"The 20 Greatest Guns N' Roses Songs – Ranked"	2020	14	
WMMR	"Guns N' Roses: All Songs Ranked"	2020	13	
MetalSucks	"All 81 Guns N' Roses Songs, Ranked From Worst to Best"	2022	23	
Uproxx	"The Best Guns N' Roses Songs, Ranked"	2022	9	
Consequence	"Guns N' Roses' 10 Best Songs"	2022	6	
The Guardian	"Guns N' Roses – their 20 greatest songs, ranked!"	2022	10	
Classic Rock	"The 50 greatest Guns N' Roses songs ever, and the stories behind them"	2023	7	
Ultimate Classic Rock	"All 84 Guns N' Roses Songs Ranked Worst to Best"	2024	4	
Yahoo Entertainment	"Guns N' Roses Greatest Hits: 11 Top Tracks"	2024	8	
Loudwire	"Every Guns N' Roses Song Ranked Worst to Best"	2024	9	
American Songwriter	"Guns N' Roses' Top 10 Songs"	2021	7	

== Commercial performance ==
On its original release on Nobody's Child, "Civil War" peaked at number four on the Billboard Album Rock Tracks chart (now the Mainstream Rock chart). When it was issued as a single in 1993, it charted in Australia, Belgium, the Netherlands, New Zealand and Norway, and reached number two in Spain. The "Civil War" EP peaked at number 11 on the UK Singles Chart and number 15 in Ireland. The song was later certified Gold in Australia in 2021 and Silver in the United Kingdom in 2025.

== Live performances ==
After its live debut at Farm Aid in 1990, "Civil War" was performed throughout the Use Your Illusion Tour in 1991, 1992 and 1993. It was not played again until December 4, 2011, at the Bridgestone Arena in Nashville, Tennessee, during the Chinese Democracy Tour, its first live performance in 18 years. Following the band's 2016 reunion, the song became a regular part of the setlist for the Not in This Lifetime... Tour (2016–2019); with 45 performances in 2016, 83 in 2017, 28 in 2018 and 16 in 2019. In total, there were 605 performances of the song by the band between its 1990 debut and November 2026. Performances from 2022 onwards have displayed the Ukrainian Flag on screen in support of Ukraine after the Russian invasion of Ukraine.

== Cover versions ==
In 2014, Rise Against frontman Tim McIlrath recorded an acoustic cover of "Civil War" for This Concerns Everyone, a protest-song compilation released by A-F Records on November 18, 2014. American metal band Bad Wolves released a cover in September 2020. In July 2025, industrial metal band 3Teeth released a cover as a standalone single.

== Track listings ==
Germany CD (GED 21810)
No.	Title	Length
1.	"Civil War" (LP version)
2.	"Garden of Eden" (LP version)
3.	"Exclusive Interview with Slash" (March 1993)

Japan CD (MVCG 13007)
No.	Title	Length
1.	"Civil War" (LP version)
2.	"Don't Damn Me" (LP version)
3.	"Back off Bitch" (LP version)
4.	"Exclusive Interview with Slash" (March 1993)

== Personnel ==
Personnel per the Use Your Illusion II liner notes.

- W. Axl Rose – lead vocals, whistling
- Slash – lead guitar, acoustic guitar
- Izzy Stradlin - rhythm guitar, backing vocals
- Duff McKagan – bass guitar, backing vocals
- Steven Adler – drums
- Dizzy Reed – piano, backing vocals

== Charts ==
Chart (1990)	Peak position
US Mainstream Rock Airplay (Billboard)	4

Chart (1993)	Peak position
Australia (ARIA)	45
Belgium (Ultratop 50 Flanders)	39
Netherlands (Single Top 100)	22
New Zealand (Recorded Music NZ)	27
Norway (VG-lista)	10
Spain (AFYVE)	2
UK Airplay (Music Week)	31

== Certifications ==
Region	Certification	Certified units/sales
Australia (ARIA)	Gold	35,000^{‡}
United Kingdom (BPI)	Silver	200,000^{‡}
^{‡} Sales+streaming figures based on certification alone.

== Release history ==
Region	Date	Format(s)	Label(s)	Ref.
Europe	May 3, 1993	CD	Geffen; Uzi Suicide	
Australia	May 10, 1993	CD; cassette	Geffen; Uzi Suicide	
Japan	June 23, 1993	CD	Geffen	

== See also ==
- List of anti-war songs
