= Don't Cry =

1991 single by Guns N' Roses

Single by Guns N' Roses

from the album Use Your Illusion I and II
- B-side: "Don't Cry" (alt. lyrics) (LP version)
- Released: September 2, 1991
- Studio: A&M (Hollywood); Record Plant (Los Angeles); Studio 56 (Los Angeles); Image Recording (Hollywood); Conway (Los Angeles); Metalworks (Mississauga, Ontario)
- Genre: Hard rock
- Length: 4:45
- Label: Uzi Suicide; Geffen
- Songwriters: Axl Rose; Izzy Stradlin
- Producers: Mike Clink; Guns N' Roses

Guns N' Roses singles chronology
"You Could Be Mine" (1991)	"Don't Cry" (1991)	"Live and Let Die" (1991)

Music video
- "Don't Cry" on YouTube

"Don't Cry" is a song by American hard rock band Guns N' Roses, two versions of which were released simultaneously on different albums. The version with the original lyrics is the fourth track on Use Your Illusion I (1991), while the version with the alternate lyrics is the 13th track on Use Your Illusion II (1991). Only the vocal tracks differ, and even then only in the verses; however, in those verses, not only are the words entirely different, but the meter and melody are also slightly different. There is also a third version, officially released only on the single for the song, which was recorded during Appetite for Destruction sessions in 1986.

Referred to as a power ballad, "Don't Cry" reached the top 10 in many countries, including peaking at number eight on the UK Singles Chart and number 10 on the US Billboard Hot 100. In Ireland, "Don't Cry" became Guns N' Roses' second number-one single, and in Finland, it became the second number-one hit from the Use Your Illusion albums. The song also topped Portugal's music chart, reached number two in New Zealand and Norway, and peaked within the top five in Australia, Denmark, and Switzerland. Andy Morahan and Mark Racco directed its accompanying music video.

== Composition and recording ==
Stradlin and Rose wrote the song (with the working title "Don't You Cry Tonight") in March 1985, shortly after Guns N' Roses was formed in Los Angeles. In fact, at a show in Atlantic City, New Jersey, on September 12, 2021, Rose claimed it was "the first song that was written for Guns N' Roses.” In the 1993 video Don't Cry: Makin' F@*!ing Videos Part I Rose says that "Don't Cry" was their most Hanoi Rocks -influenced song. In the Special Collector's Edition of Rolling Stone dedicated to the band, Kory Grow quotes Rose:

It was [about] a girl that Izzy had gone out with, and I was really attracted to her, and they split up. I was sitting outside the Roxy, and I was really in love with this person and she was realizing this wasn't going to work – she wanted to do other things, and she was telling me goodbye and I sat down and just started crying, and she was telling me, 'Don't cry.' The next night, we got together and wrote the song in five minutes.

At the September 2021 Atlantic City show cited above, Rose told the crowd:

“I went over to Izzy’s and I threw some rocks at his window. He came to the window and was worried I came over there to kick his ass. We’d been in an argument for a few months. It was like the Blues Brothers. ‘We gotta get the band back together'...We sat down, and I was like, ‘Hey, I got some really depressing lyrics.’ He was like, ‘I got a really depressing guitar part.’ I was like, ‘Perfect, we got it made.'”

In his book Over the Top: The True Story of Guns N' Roses, Mark Putterford notes the song's contrast with much of the other material on the Illusion albums, citing Rose's "deeply ingrained whore/madonna dichotomy" and his "dew-eyed romantic cooing with tenderness." "Don't Cry" features Shannon Hoon of Blind Melon as a co-lead vocalist. Hoon sings an octave higher than Rose, and his voice is placed further back in the mix; Hoon also appears in the music video, singing alongside Rose during the helipad scenes. In his autobiography, Slash states that Hoon's harmony vocal "made that song all the more soulful." Along with "Estranged" and "November Rain," it forms a narrative inspired in part by the short story "Without You" by Del James.

== Music video ==
The official music video for the song was directed by Andy Morahan and Mark Racco. John Linson was the producer of the video.

Rose commented on the difficulty of filming the video and how certain scenes inspired by his relationship with Erin Everly affected him emotionally:

With our video for "Don't Cry," and the fight that Stephanie Seymour, (Axl's then-current girlfriend) and I had over the gun, you don't necessarily know what's going on. But in real life that happened with Erin Everly (Axl's ex-wife) and myself. I was going to shoot myself. We fought over the gun and I finally let her win. I was kind of mentally crippled after that. Before shooting our documentary, I said, "This seems really hard, 'cause it really happened." And the night we wrote the scene, my friend Josh said, "Okay, how are you going to play that?" He wanted to rehearse and I was like, "Look, leave me alone." But he kept pushing until, finally, I stood up. I had this cigarette lighter that looked like a real gun and I said, "Look, I'm gonna do it like this." And I just went over and slammed around in the hallway a bit and threw the gun and said, "Is that good enough for you?"

Izzy Stradlin did not attend the music video shoot by the time the band came to film the video and therefore does not appear in the video for the song he co-wrote. A month later, it was announced he had quit the band. A sign saying 'Where's Izzy' can be seen in the video. Stradlin later deemed the multi-million dollar video "a pointless indulgence."

Axl Rose also briefly wore a St. Louis Cardinals baseball cap in the video. This is possibly a reference to the Riverport Riot that occurred after Guns N' Roses performed at the Riverport Amphitheater in St. Louis on July 2, 1991. They were banned from performing there again, but played there again on July 27, 2017 on the Not In This Lifetime... Tour.

== Live performances ==
"Don't Cry" was performed quite frequently during the early tours and the Use Your Illusion Tour. It was absent from the early legs (i.e. 2001–02) of the Chinese Democracy Tour but reappeared to an extent in 2006, as guitarist Bumblefoot began using an instrumental version of the song as a guitar solo spot. In 2007, during the Bumblefoot solo spot, Axl came on stage to sing along to the solo on two occasions, marking the first times since 1993 that Axl had sung it live.

"Don't Cry" made another return during the 2009/2010 World Tour, with Axl singing along with the solo spot on each occasion that it has been played.

A recording of the song from the Tokyo Dome was released on the album Live Era '87–'93 and a VHS/DVD. A further recording was issued on Appetite for Democracy 3D.

== Track listing ==
- CD single (Geffen 21651)
1. "Don't Cry" (original) – 4:42
2. "Don't Cry" (alt. lyrics) – 4:42
3. "Don't Cry" (demo – 1985 Mystic Studio Sessions) – 4:42

== Personnel ==
- W. Axl Rose – lead vocals
- Slash – lead guitar
- Izzy Stradlin – rhythm guitar, backing vocals
- Duff McKagan – bass, backing vocals
- Matt Sorum – drums
- Dizzy Reed – keyboard

Additional musicians

- Shannon Hoon – co-lead vocals
- Steven Adler – drums (demo version)

== Charts ==
=== Weekly charts ===
Chart (1991–1992)	Peak position
Australia (ARIA)	5
Belgium (Ultratop 50 Flanders)	10
Canada Top Singles (RPM)	11
Denmark (IFPI)	3
Europe (Eurochart Hot 100)	5
Europe (European Radio Top 50)	17
Europe (European Hit Radio)	8
Finland (Suomen virallinen lista)	1
France (SNEP)	25
Germany (GfK)	22
Ireland (IRMA)	1
Japan (Oricon)	48
Luxembourg (Radio Luxembourg)	3
Netherlands (Dutch Top 40)	6
Netherlands (Single Top 100)	7
New Zealand (Recorded Music NZ)	2
Norway (VG-lista)	2
Portugal (AFP)	1
Spain (AFYVE)	10
Sweden (Sverigetopplistan)	9
Switzerland (Schweizer Hitparade)	3
UK Singles (Official Charts)	8
UK Airplay (Music Week)	18
Uruguay (UPI)	4
US Billboard Hot 100	10
US Cash Box Top 100	7

=== Year-end charts ===
Chart (1991)	Position
Australia (ARIA)	61
Canada Top Singles (RPM)	87
Europe (Eurochart Hot 100)	63
Europe (European Hit Radio)	68
Netherlands (Dutch Top 40)	92
Netherlands (Single Top 100)	69
New Zealand (RIANZ)	25
Sweden (Topplistan)	42

Chart (1992)	Position
Europe (Eurochart Hot 100)	99
Sweden (Topplistan)	77

== Certifications ==
Region	Certification	Certified units/sales
Denmark (IFPI Danmark)	Gold	45,000^{‡}
Italy (FIMI)	Platinum	50,000^{‡}
New Zealand (RMNZ)	Gold	5,000^{*}
Spain (Promusicae)	Platinum	60,000^{‡}
United Kingdom (BPI)	Silver	200,000^{‡}
United States (RIAA)	Gold	500,000^{^}
^{*} Sales figures based on certification alone.^{^} Shipments figures based on certification alone.^{‡} Sales+streaming figures based on certification alone.

== Release history ==
Region	Date	Format(s)	Label(s)	Ref.
Australia	September 2, 1991	7-inch vinyl; 12-inch vinyl; CD; cassette	Uzi Suicide; Geffen	
Japan	September 11, 1991	Mini-CD	Geffen	
