= Mike Clink =

American record producer

- Born: United States
- Genres: Rock; glam metal; heavy metal; pop
- Occupation: Record producer
- Labels: Geffen, Chrysalis
- Website: mikeclinkproductions.com

Mike Clink is an American record producer. He began his career as an engineer at Record Plant Studios, recording such bands as Whitesnake, Triumph, Guns N' Roses, Mötley Crüe, Megadeth, UFO, Jefferson Starship, the Babys, Heart, and Eddie Money.

== Career ==
Clink began producing in 1986. "After a series of failed attempts", Steve Kurutz at AllMusic noted, "a young band named Guns N' Roses asked Clink to produce their debut album, Appetite for Destruction." "We could have made it all smooth and polished with (original producer) Spencer Proffer," noted Axl Rose, "[but] it was too fucking radio (i.e., radio-friendly). That's why we went with Mike Clink."

In 1988, Clink began work on Metallica's ...And Justice for All but was replaced with Flemming Rasmussen, who had helmed the band's preceding two albums.

In 1989, Clink produced the Sea Hags' critically acclaimed, self-titled debut album, recorded at Captain and Tennille's Rumbo Recorders. It would be the band's only album. The following year, Clink coproduced the successful Rust in Peace by American thrash metal band Megadeth. He left the project shortly before finishing it in order to work with Guns N' Roses.

Clink has spoken on panels focusing on digital rights, new media technology, and copyright protection.

== Selected discography ==
=== As producer ===
Artist	Album name	Year
Triumph	The Sport of Kings	1986
Survivor	When Seconds Count	1986
Guns N' Roses	Appetite for Destruction	1987
Mari Hamada	In the Precious Age	1987
Hurricane	Over the Edge	1988
Guns N' Roses	Lies	1988
Whitesnake	Slip of the Tongue	1989
Sea Hags	Sea Hags	1989
Little Caesar	Street Survivors	1989
Megadeth	Rust in Peace	1990
Guns N' Roses	Use Your Illusion I	1991
Guns N' Roses	Use Your Illusion II	1991
Roxy Blue	Want Some?	1992
Guns N' Roses	"The Spaghetti Incident?"	1993
I Mother Earth	Dig	1993
Slash	"Magic Carpet Ride" from Coneheads	1993
Sammy Hagar	(Un)boxed	1994
Guns N' Roses	"Sympathy for the Devil" from Interview with the Vampire	1994
Slash's Snakepit	It's Five O'Clock Somewhere	1995
Beth Hart Band	Immortal	1996
Sammy Hagar	Marching to Mars	1997
Size 14	Size 14	1997
Fuzzbubble	"Out There" from Godzilla: The Album	1998
Fuzzbubble	"Bliss" from the Hell City, Hell soundtrack	1998
Pushmonkey	Pushmonkey	1998
Mötley Crüe	New Tattoo	2000
Pushmonkey	El Bitche	2001
Pure Rubbish	Glamorous Youth	2001
Steve Vai	The Infinite Steve Vai: An Anthology (co-produced)	2003
The Glitterati	The Glitterati	2005
Camp Freddy	"The Jean Genie"	2006
Warner Drive	Fully Loaded	2006
Crushed	My Machine	2006
Sarah Kelly	Where the Past Meets Today	2006
Brad Cox	New Directions	2008
Crushed	Shadows and Substance	2008
Camp Freddy	"Merry Xmas Everybody"	2008
The Sonic Graffiti	"Mystery Number" from The Haiti Project	2010
State Line Empire	Octane EP	2011
Mumiy Troll	Vladivostok	2012
Shelter Dogs	Take Me Home	2014
Archer	Culling the Weak	2015
Jaime Wyatt	Felony Blues	2017
Lucie	"Nejlepší, kterou znám" from EvoLucie	2018
Les Stroud	Bittern Lake	2018
American Bombshell	"My Drug" from Tattooed 'N Bruised	2019
Les Stroud	Mother Earth	2019
Archer Nation	Beneath the Dream	2019
Capital Theatre	A Hero's Journey	2021
Slash	Orgy of the Damned	2024
Various artists	Magic Power: All Star Tribute to Triumph	2025

=== As engineer ===
Artist	Album name	Year
UFO	Strangers in the Night	1979
Jefferson Starship	Freedom at Point Zero	1979
Eddie Money	Playing for Keeps	1980
Jefferson Starship	Modern Times	1981
707	The Bridge	1983
Survivor	Caught in the Game	1983
Shooting Star	Silent Scream	1985
Metallica	...And Justice for All	1988
Metallica	Garage Inc.	1998
Sammy Hagar	Ten 13	2000

== Awards and nominations ==
Several of Clink's productions and recordings have received awards and nominations, including Lucie's single "Nejlepší, kterou znám", from the album EvoLucie. Both the single and the album won Anděl Awards, for Song of the Year and Album of the Year, respectively.

Artist	Work / Recording name	Award	Result	Credit
Guns N' Roses	G N' R Lies	Grammy: Best Hard Rock Performance	Nominated	Producer, engineer
Megadeth	Rust in Peace	Grammy: Best Metal Performance	Nominated	Producer, engineer
Guns N' Roses	Use Your Illusion I	Grammy: Best Hard Rock Performance	Nominated	Producer, engineer
Guns N' Roses	"Live and Let Die"	Grammy: Best Hard Rock Performance	Nominated	Producer, engineer
I Mother Earth	Dig	Juno: Best Hard Rock Album	Won	Producer, engineer
Sarah Kelly	Where the Past Meets Today	Grammy: Best Rock or Rap Gospel Album	Nominated	Producer, engineer
Lucie	"Nejlepší, kterou znám"	Anděl Award: Song of the Year	Won	Producer, engineer, mixer
Lucie	EvoLucie	Anděl Award: Album of the Year	Won	Producer, engineer, mixer
Guns N' Roses	Appetite for Destruction – Locked N' Loaded edition	Grammy: Best Boxed or Special Ltd Edition Pkg	Nominated	Producer, engineer
