= List of songs recorded by Guns N' Roses =

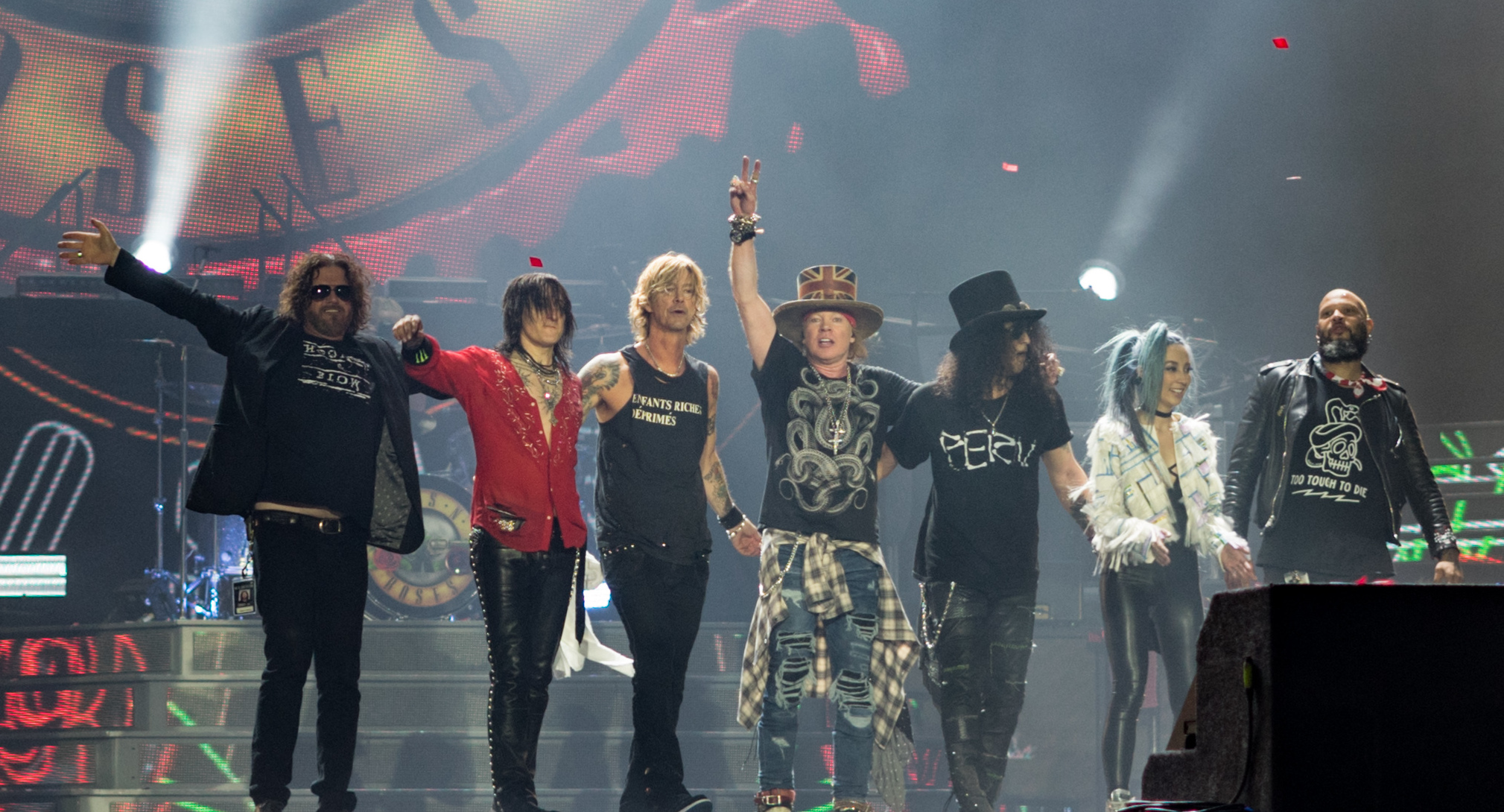
Guns N' Roses onstage in 2017.

Guns N' Roses is an American hard rock band originally formed in 1985 by members of Hollywood Rose and L.A. Guns. After signing with Geffen Records in 1986, the band released its debut album Appetite for Destruction in 1987. All songs on the album were credited as written by the full band, composed of vocalist Axl Rose, guitarists Slash and Izzy Stradlin, bassist Duff McKagan and drummer Steven Adler, while "It's So Easy" was co-written by West Arkeen and "Anything Goes" was co-written by Chris Weber, formerly of Hollywood Rose. The following year saw the release of the band's second album G N' R Lies, made up of all four tracks from 1986's Live ?!*@ Like a Suicide EP and four acoustic-based tracks.

Following a period of touring, in 1990 Guns N' Roses replaced Adler with Matt Sorum, and keyboardist Dizzy Reed was added to the lineup. On September 17, 1991, the band released its third and fourth studio albums Use Your Illusion I and Use Your Illusion II. The songs on the albums were credited to their individual songwriters rather than the band as a whole, with Rose, Stradlin and Slash contributing to the majority of tracks. Other band members besides Rose performed lead vocals on a number of tracks, and the albums also featured a range of guest musicians including Shannon Hoon, Michael Monroe, and Alice Cooper. Stradlin later left the band and was replaced by Gilby Clarke.

In 1993 the band released "The Spaghetti Incident?", an album of cover versions and the band's first release to feature Clarke. Among others, the album featured recordings of "Raw Power" by The Stooges, "Since I Don't Have You" by The Skyliners and a medley of "Buick Mackane" and "Big Dumb Sex" by T. Rex and Soundgarden, respectively. The following year, Clarke was replaced with Paul Tobias and the band released a cover of The Rolling Stones song "Sympathy for the Devil" for the soundtrack to the film Interview with the Vampire. This would prove to be the final involvement for long-term band members Slash, McKagan, and Sorum, who would later leave at various points over the next few years.

In the years after the release of "The Spaghetti Incident?", Guns N' Roses went through a number of lineup changes during the recording of the long-awaited Chinese Democracy. In 1999, the song "Oh My God" – the band's first original recording since the Use Your Illusion albums – was released on the soundtrack for End of Days, featuring Dave Navarro and Gary Sunshine on guitar. Chinese Democracy was eventually released, after a number of delays, on November 23, 2008, over 17 years after the release of Use Your Illusion I and II. The album featured contributions from most of the members the band had featured between 1994 and 2008, including vocalist Rose, bassisst Tommy Stinson, guitarists Buckethead, Robin Finck, Richard Fortus and Tobias, drummers Brain and Frank Ferrer, and keyboardists Reed and Chris Pitman, with a number of these performers having co-written songs on the album. Slash and McKagan rejoined the band in 2016 (alongside new member Melissa Reese, replacing Pitman), and a remastered box set of Appetite for Destruction was released in 2018, preceded by the lead single "Shadow of Your Love". From 2021, the band started releasing re-workings of Chinese-era songs, with "Absurd" and "Hard Skool" coming out that year, and "Perhaps" and "The General" in 2023. "Nothin'" and "Atlas" followed in December 2025.

== Songs ==
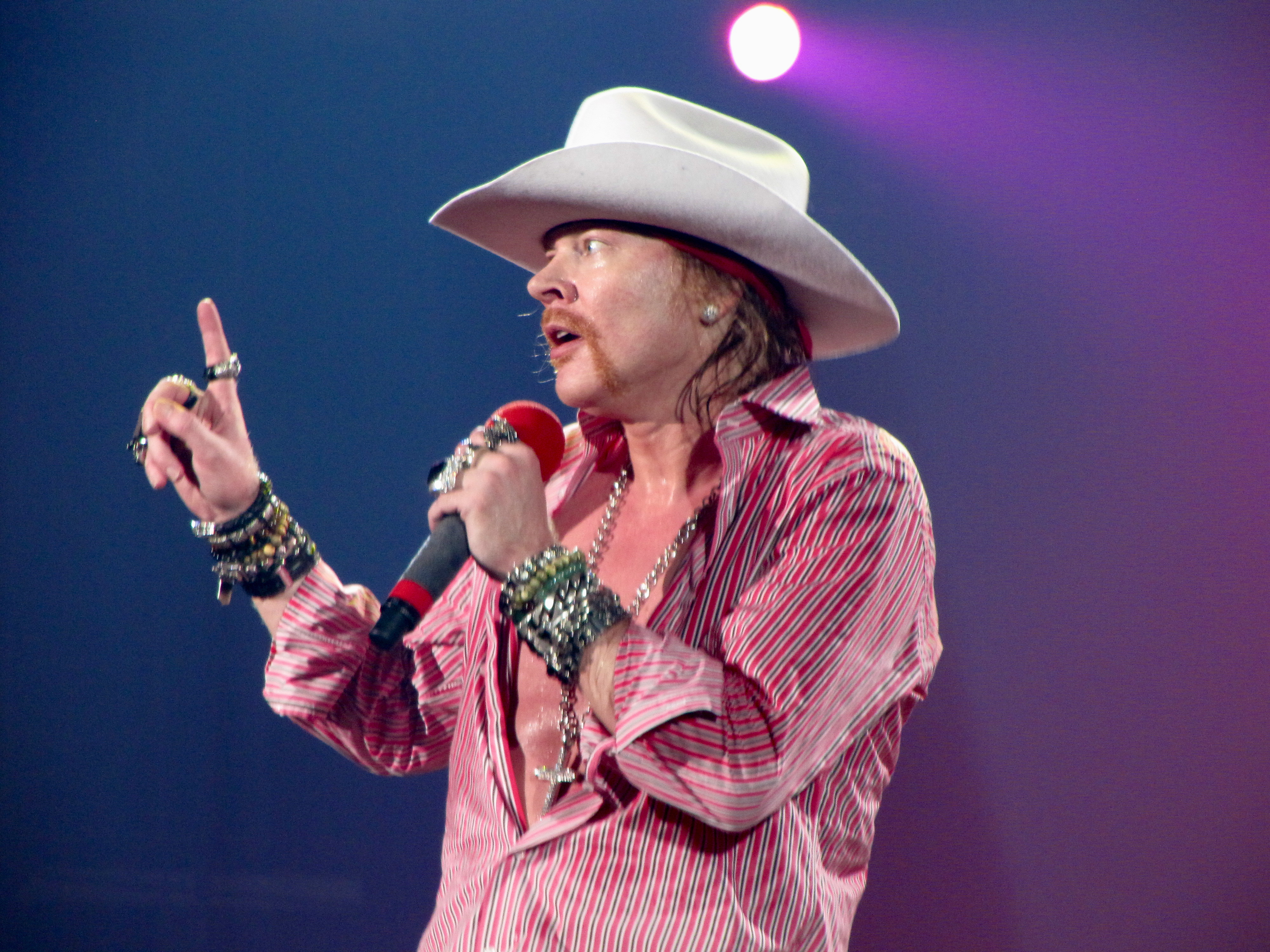
Axl Rose remains the band's only constant member since its formation.

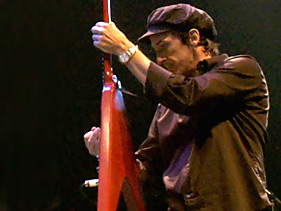
Izzy Stradlin was the original rhythm guitarist for Guns N' Roses, and wrote prolifically during his time with the band.

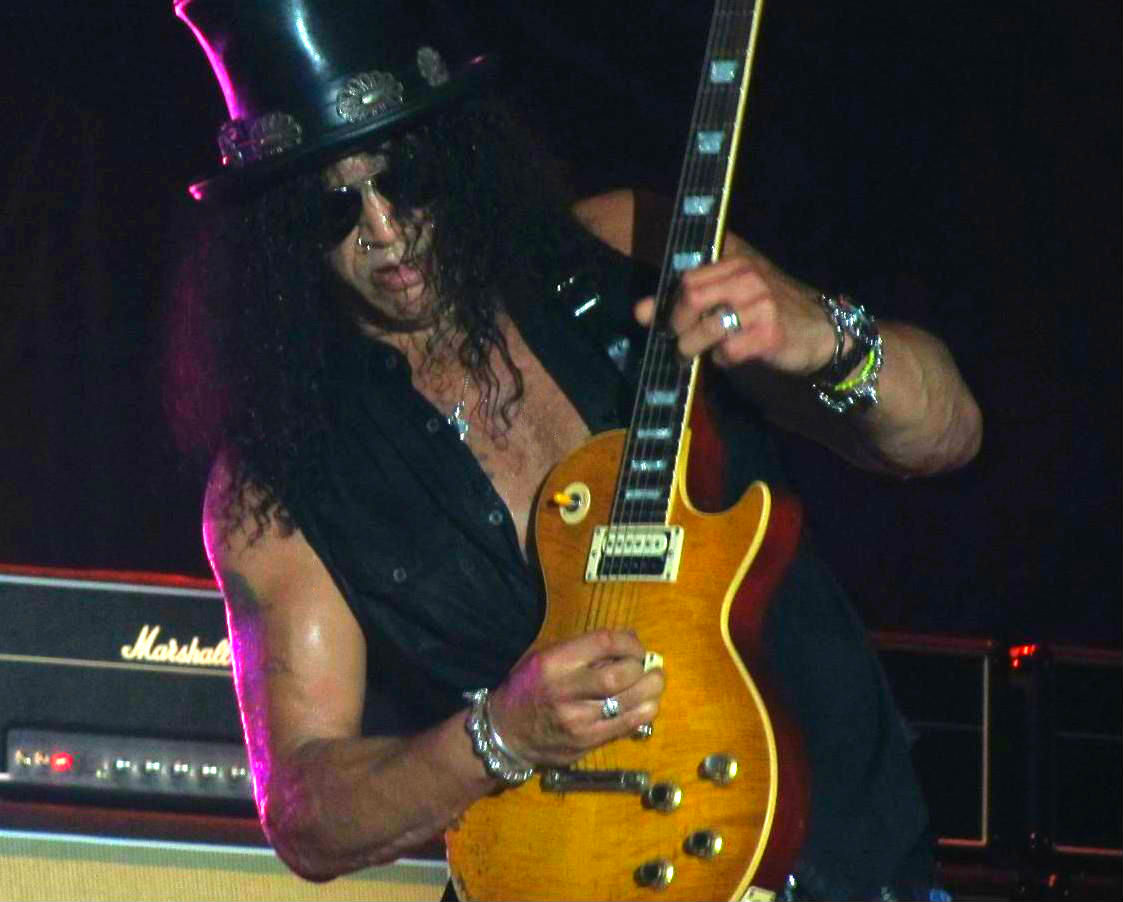
Slash wrote and performed with the band from 1985 to around 1996, rejoining in 2016

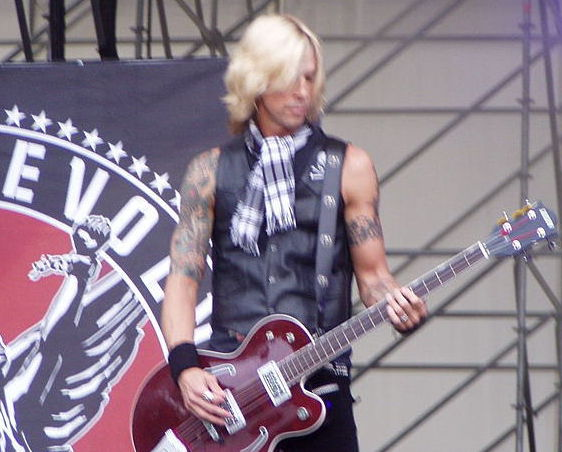
Duff McKagan performed on the band's first five albums, before leaving in 1997 and rejoining in 2016

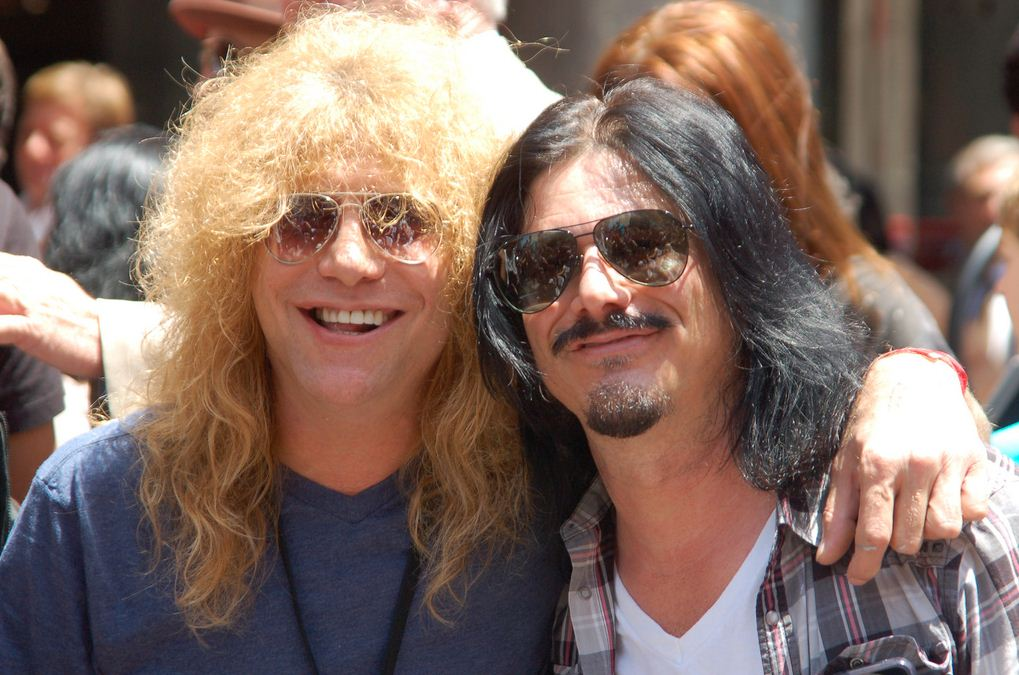
Drummer Steven Adler (left) performed on the band's first two albums; rhythm guitarist Gilby Clarke (right) performed on 1993's "The Spaghetti Incident?"

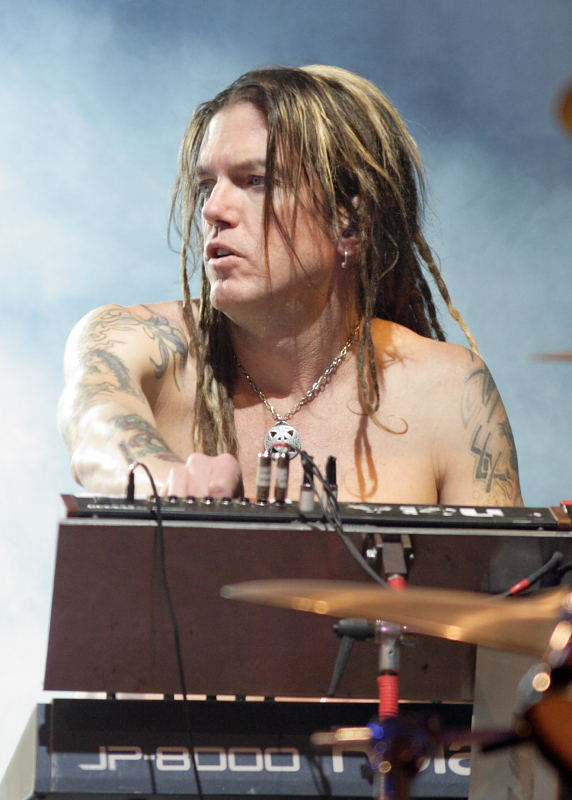
After Rose, keyboardist Dizzy Reed remains the longest-standing member of Guns N' Roses, having joined in 1990.

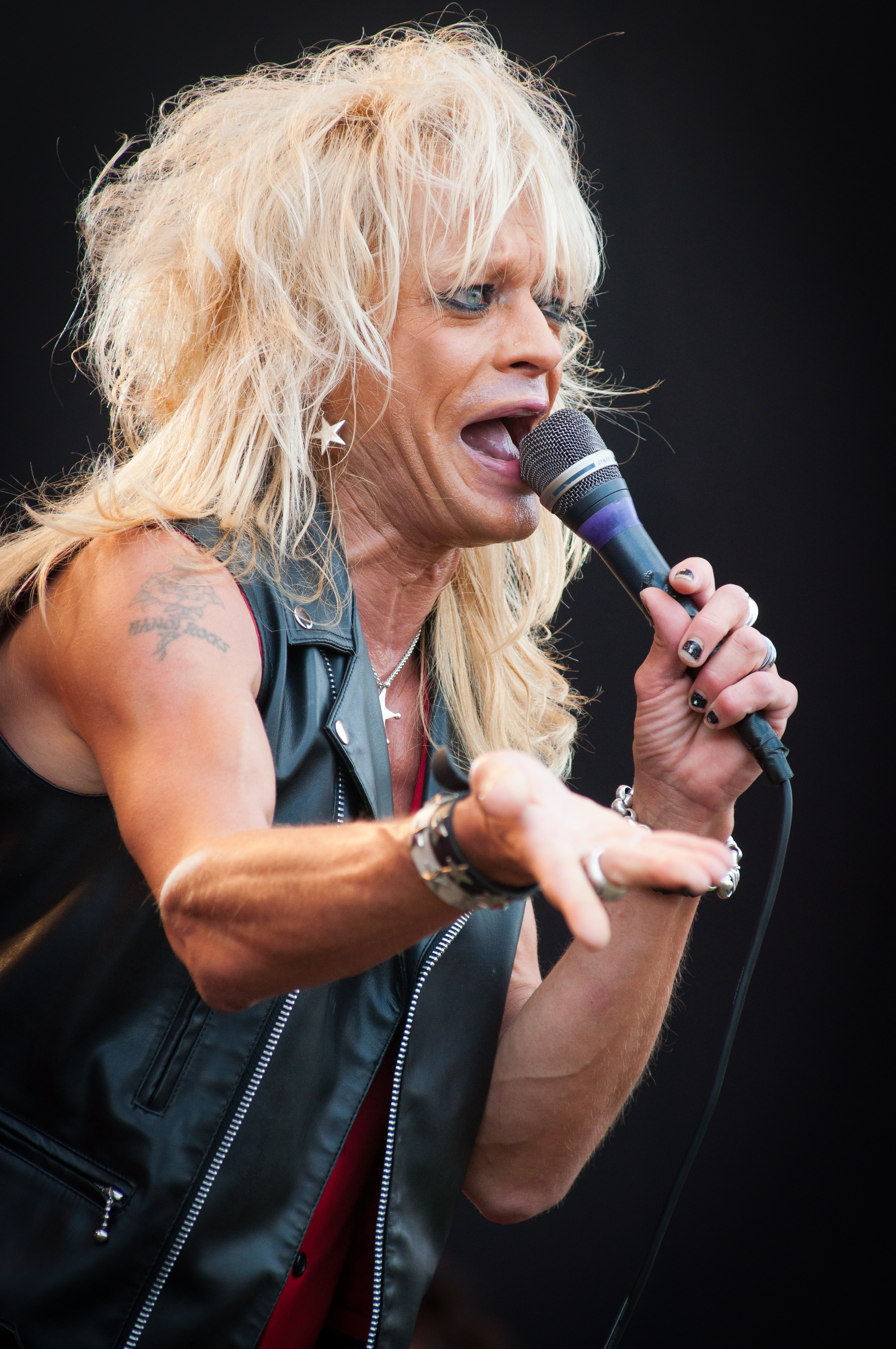
Hanoi Rocks frontman Michael Monroe made guest appearances on "Bad Obsession" and "Ain't It Fun".

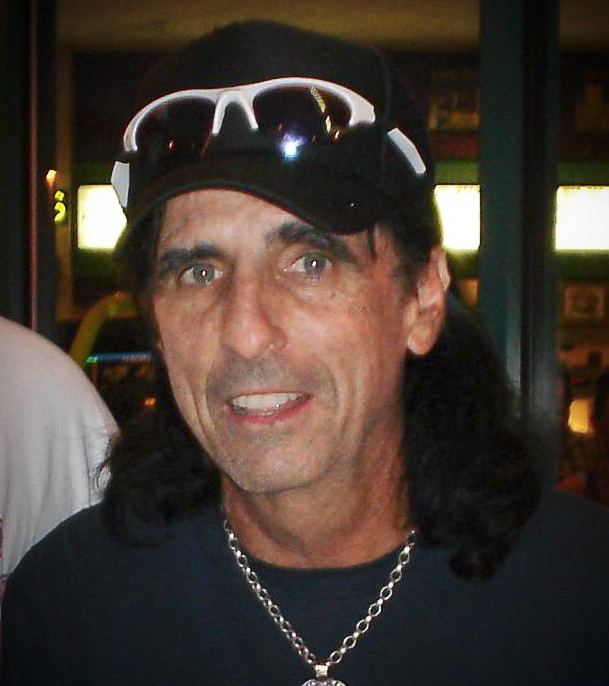
Alice Cooper performed additional vocals on the track "The Garden"

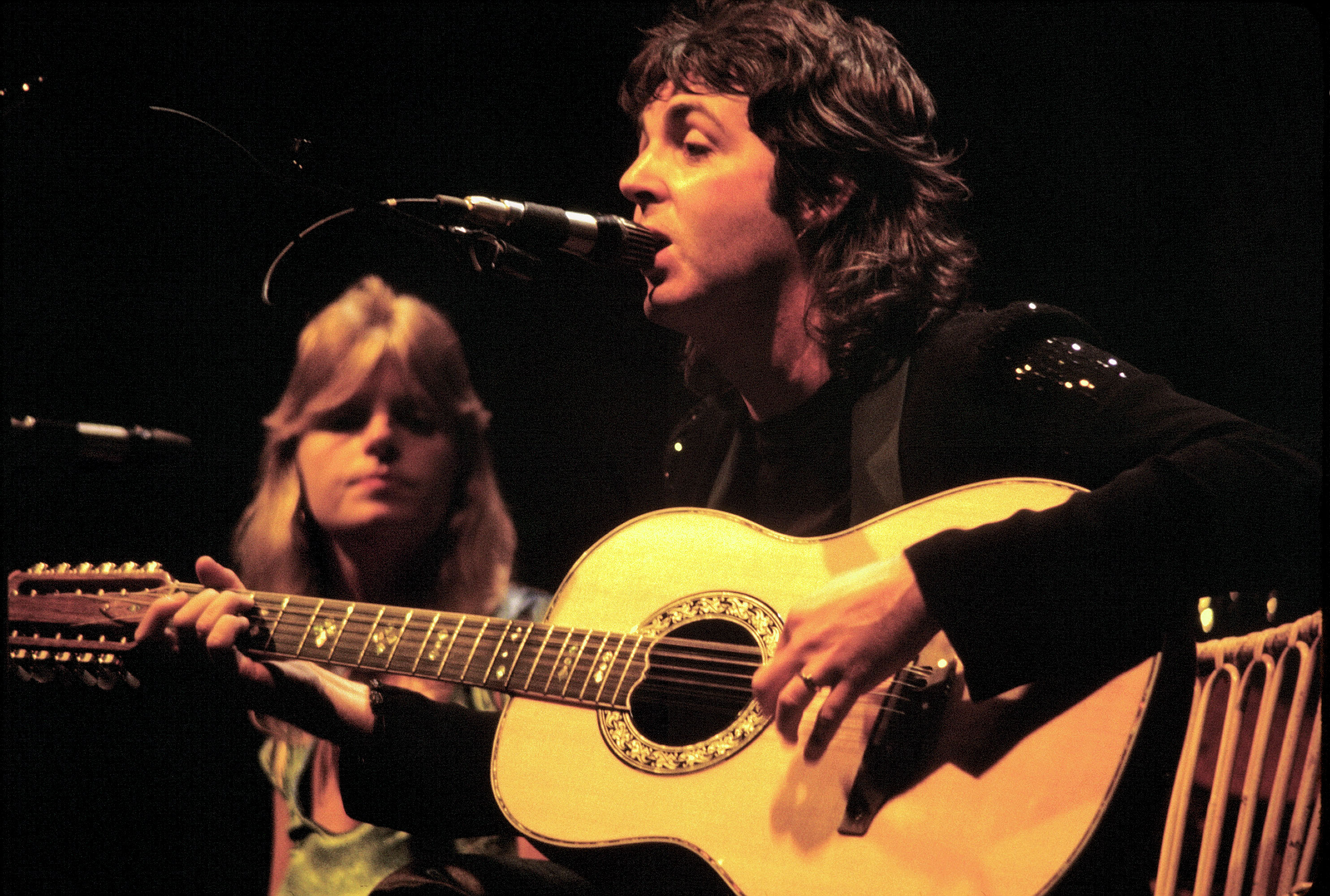
Guns N' Roses released a recording of "Live and Let Die", written by Paul and Linda McCartney, in 1991.

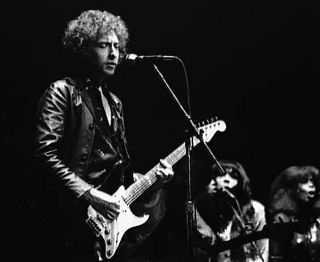
The band also covered Bob Dylan's "Knockin' on Heaven's Door"

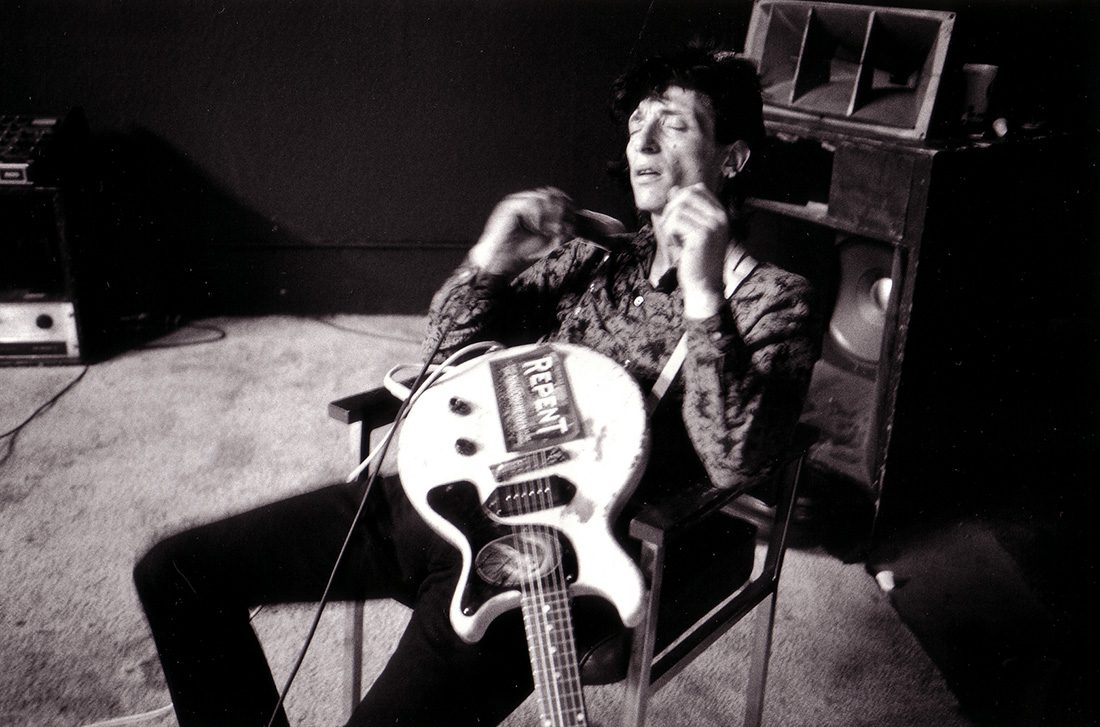
"The Spaghetti Incident?" features two songs written by Johnny Thunders

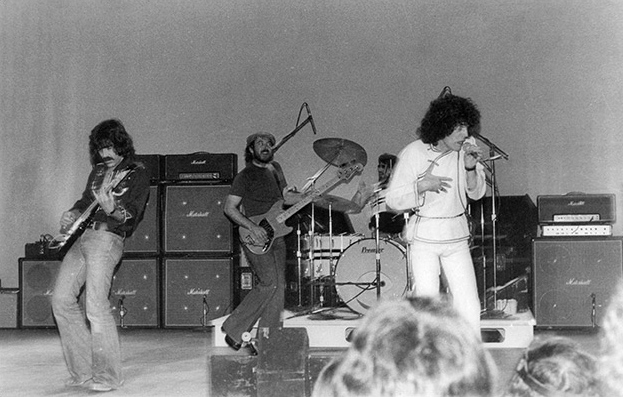
Nazareth's "Hair of the Dog" was recorded for "The Spaghetti Incident?"

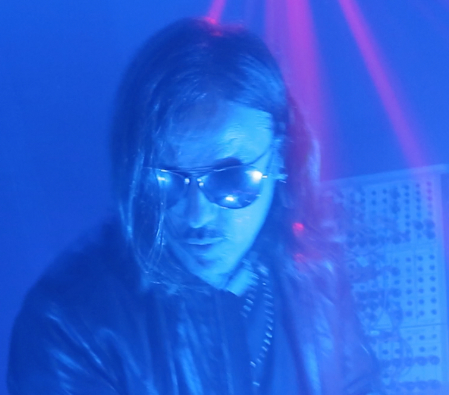
Chris Pitman, who was a band member between 1998 and 2016, contributed to every track on Chinese Democracy.

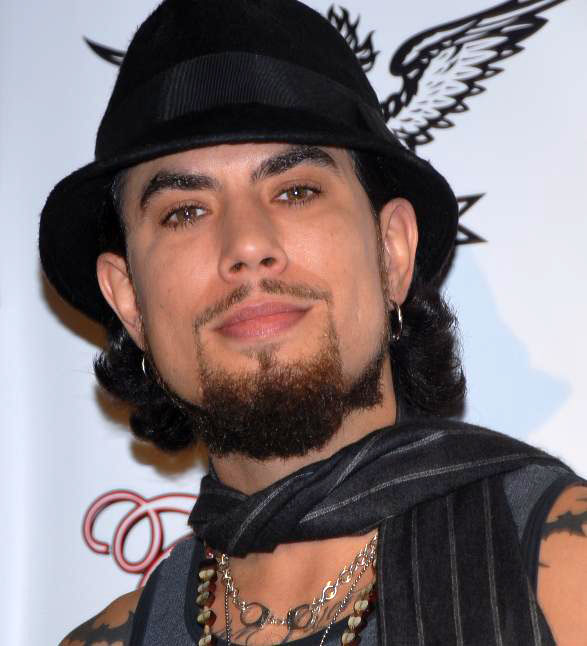
Guitarist Dave Navarro performed on the 1999 song "Oh My God"

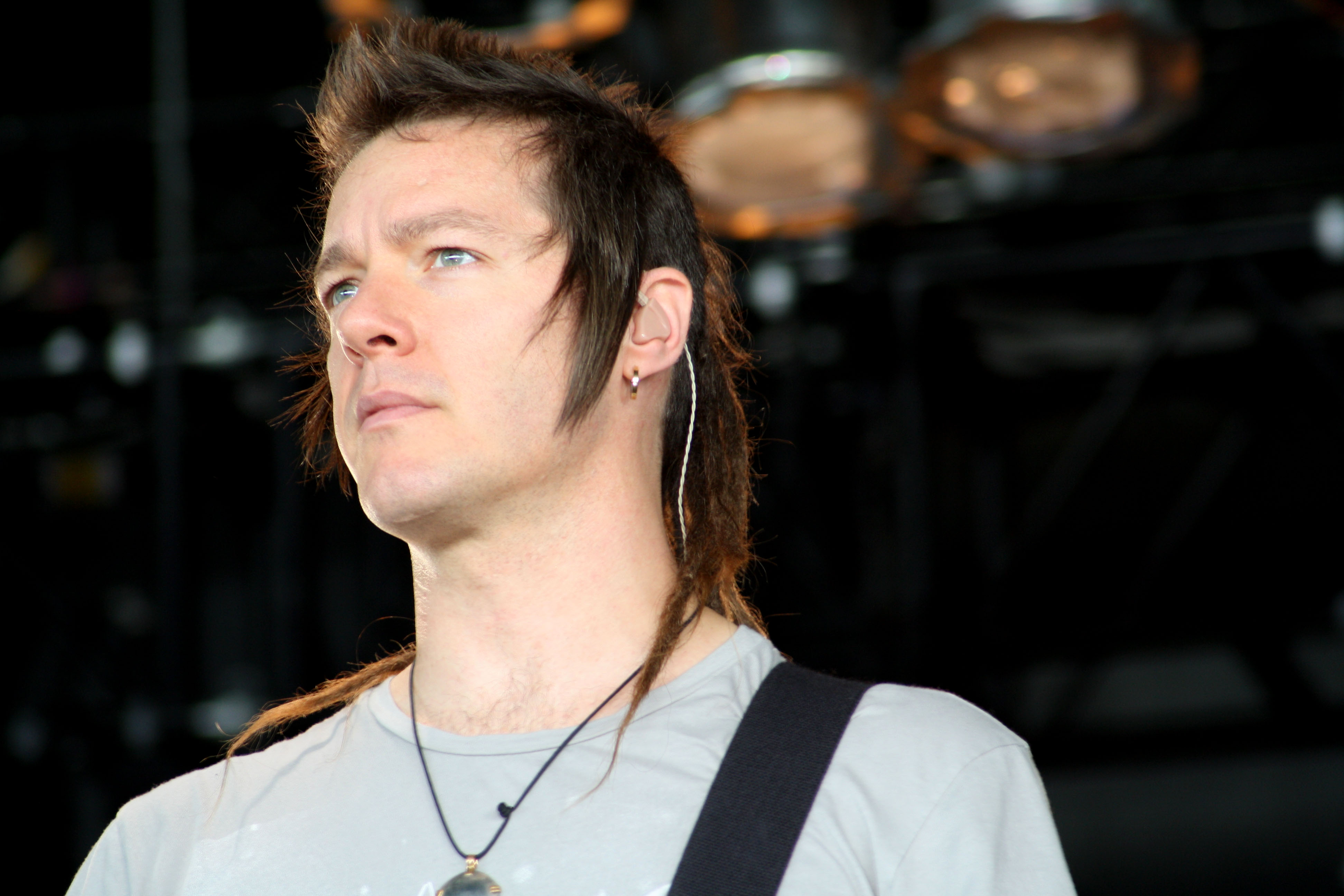
Robin Finck performed guitar on every track on Chinese Democracy, and also co-wrote the song "Better"

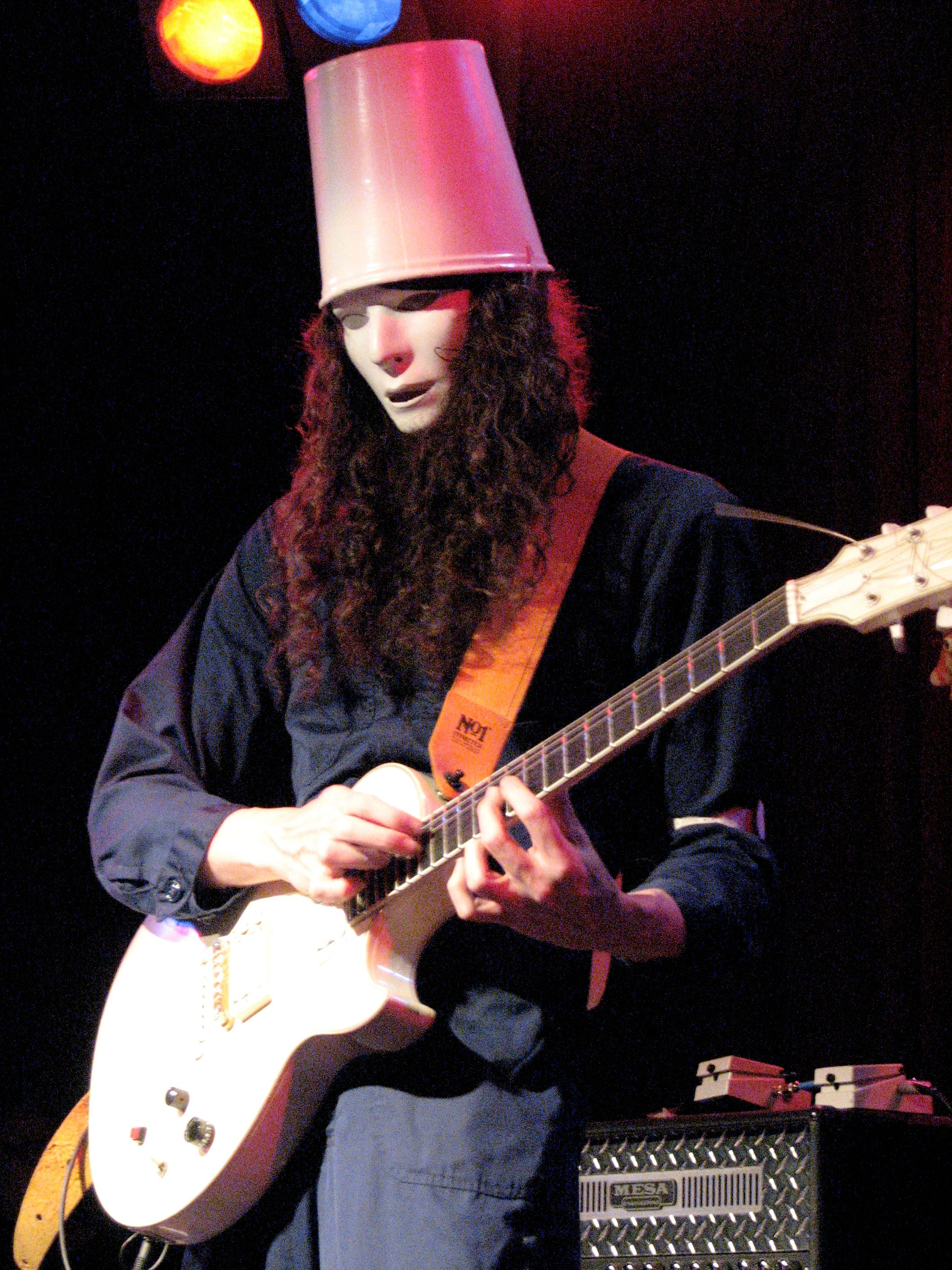
Guitarist Buckethead performed on all but two tracks on Chinese Democracy

Key
†	Indicates song released as a single
§	Indicates song released as a promotional single

Song	Credited writer(s)	Release	Year	Ref.	Notes	Video
"14 Years"§	W. Axl Rose; Izzy Stradlin	Use Your Illusion II	1991			
"Absurd" †	W. Axl Rose; Darren Reed; Saul Hudson; Duff McKagan	Hard Skool	2021		(Note: Originally known as "Silkworms" written by Chris Pitman and Dizzy Reed, recorded during the Chinese Democracy sessions, played live in 2001, leaked to the internet in 2018. Reworked and re-debuted live in 2021 before being released as a single.)	
"Ain't It Fun" †	Eugene O'Connor; Peter Laughner	"The Spaghetti Incident?"	1993		(Note: "Ain't It Fun" was originally recorded by Dead Boys.)	
"Ain't Going Down"	Guns N' Roses; Chris Weber	Guns N' Roses Pinball	1994		(Note: "Ain't Going Down" is also known as "Ain't Going Down No More". Not to be confused with the unreleased song "Going Down", which was leaked in 2012.)	
"Anything Goes"	Guns N' Roses; Chris Weber	Appetite for Destruction	1987			
"Atlas" †	Guns N' Roses	"Nothin'" / "Atlas"	2025		(Note: Working title was "Atlas Shrugged", originally featuring Brian May, leaked in 2019, soundchecked in 2025))	
"Attitude"	Glenn Danzig	"The Spaghetti Incident?"	1993		(Note: "Attitude" was originally recorded by Misfits.)	
"Back Off Bitch"	W. Axl Rose; Paul Tobias	Use Your Illusion I	1991			
"Bad Apples"	W. Axl Rose; Izzy Stradlin; Saul Hudson; Duff McKagan	Use Your Illusion I	1991			
"Bad Obsession"	Izzy Stradlin; Aaron Arkeen	Use Your Illusion I	1991			
"Better"§	W. Axl Rose; Robert Finck	Chinese Democracy	2008		(Note: working title was "Three Dollar Pyramid")	
"Black Leather"	Steve Jones; Paul Cook	"The Spaghetti Incident?"	1993		(Note: "Black Leather" was originally recorded by The Runaways.)	
"Breakdown"	W. Axl Rose	Use Your Illusion II	1991			
"Buick Makane (Big Dumb Sex)"	Marc Bolan; Chris Cornell	"The Spaghetti Incident?"	1993		(Note: "Buick Makane (Big Dumb Sex)" is a medley of "Buick Mackane", originally recorded by T. Rex, and "Big Dumb Sex", originally recorded by Soundgarden.)	
"Catcher in the Rye"	W. Axl Rose; Robert Finck; Darren Reed; Paul Tobias; Tommy Stinson	Chinese Democracy	2008			
"Chinese Democracy" †	W. Axl Rose; Robert Finck; Paul Tobias; Tommy Stinson; Darren Reed; Josh Freese; Caram Costanzo; Eric Caudieux	Chinese Democracy	2008		(Note: working title was "Chinese Stew")	
"Civil War"	W. Axl Rose; Saul Hudson; Duff McKagan	Nobody's Child: Romanian Angel Appeal; Use Your Illusion II	1990; 1991			
"Coma"	W. Axl Rose; Saul Hudson	Use Your Illusion I	1991			
"Dead Horse"§	W. Axl Rose	Use Your Illusion I	1991			
"Don't Cry" †	W. Axl Rose; Izzy Stradlin	Use Your Illusion I Use Your Illusion II	1991; 1991		(Note: Two versions of "Don't Cry" were recorded – the "original version" on Use Your Illusion and the "alternate lyrics" version on Use Your Illusion II.)	
"Don't Damn Me"	W. Axl Rose; Saul Hudson; Dave Lank	Use Your Illusion I	1991			
"Double Talkin' Jive"	Izzy Stradlin	Use Your Illusion I	1991			
"Down on the Farm"	Charlie Harper; Alvin Gibbs; Nicholas Garrett	"The Spaghetti Incident?"	1993		(Note: "Down on the Farm" was originally recorded by U.K. Subs.)	
"Dust N' Bones"	Saul Hudson; Duff McKagan; Izzy Stradlin	Use Your Illusion I	1991			
"Estranged" †	W. Axl Rose	Use Your Illusion II	1991			
"Garden of Eden"§	W. Axl Rose; Saul Hudson	Use Your Illusion I	1991			
"Get in the Ring"	W. Axl Rose; Saul Hudson; Duff McKagan	Use Your Illusion II	1991			
"Hair of the Dog"§	William McCatterfy; Manny Charlton; Peter Agnew; Darrell Sweet	"The Spaghetti Incident?"	1993		(Note: "Hair of the Dog" was originally recorded by Nazareth.)	
"Hard Skool" †	W. Axl Rose; Saul Hudson; Duff McKagan; Robert Finck; Josh Freese; Tommy Stinson; Paul Tobias	Hard Skool	2021		(Note: Also known as "Hard School", "Hardschool", "Jackie Chan" and "Checkmate"(originally recorded during the Chinese Democracy sessions, snippet leaked in 2006, full song leaked in 2019, reworked and released as a single in 2021.))	
"Heartbreak Hotel"	Mae Boren Axton; Thomas Durden; Elvis Presley	Appetite for Destruction Super Deluxe Edition	2018		(Note: "Heartbreak Hotel" was originally recorded by Elvis Presley)	
"Human Being"	David Johansen; John Genzale	"The Spaghetti Incident?"	1993		(Note: "Human Being" was originally recorded by New York Dolls.)	
"I Don't Care About You"	Lee James Jude	"The Spaghetti Incident?"	1993		(Note: "I Don't Care About You" was originally recorded by Fear.)	
"I.R.S."	W. Axl Rose; Darren Reed; Paul Tobias	Chinese Democracy	2008			
"If the World"	W. Axl Rose; Chris Pitman	Chinese Democracy	2008		(Note: working title was "If")	
"It's Alright"	Bill Ward	Live Era '87–'93	1999			
"It's So Easy" †	Guns N' Roses; Aaron Arkeen	Appetite for Destruction	1987			
"Jumpin' Jack Flash"	Jagger-Richards; Bill Wyman	Appetite for Destruction Super Deluxe Edition	2018		(Note: "Jumpin' Jack Flash" was originally recorded by The Rolling Stones)	
"Knockin' on Heaven's Door" †	Bob Dylan	Days Of Thunder; Use Your Illusion II	1990; 1991		(Note: "Knockin' on Heaven's Door" was originally recorded by Bob Dylan.)	
"Live and Let Die" †	Paul McCartney; Linda McCartney	Use Your Illusion I	1991		(Note: "Live and Let Die" was originally recorded by Paul McCartney & Wings.)	
"Locomotive (Complicity)"	W. Axl Rose; Saul Hudson	Use Your Illusion II	1991			
"Look at Your Game, Girl"	Charles Manson	"The Spaghetti Incident?"	1993		(Note: "Look at Your Game, Girl", originally recorded by Charles Manson, was featured as a hidden track at the end of "I Don't Care About You".)	
"Madagascar"	W. Axl Rose; Chris Pitman; Martin Luther King Jr.	Chinese Democracy	2008			
"Mama Kin"	Steven Tyler	Live ?!*@ Like a Suicide	1986		(Note: "Mama Kin" was originally recorded by Aerosmith.) (Note: "Mama Kin", "Move to the City", "Nice Boys" and "Reckless Life" were also later released on G N' R Lies.)	
"Move to the City"§	Guns N' Roses; Chris Weber	Live ?!*@ Like a Suicide; Appetite for Destruction Super Deluxe Edition	1986; 2018		(Note: "Move to the City (1988 Acoustic Version)" was released as a promotional single in 2018.)	
"Mr. Brownstone"	Guns N' Roses	Appetite for Destruction	1987			
"My Michelle"§	Guns N' Roses	Appetite for Destruction	1987			
"My World"	W. Axl Rose	Use Your Illusion II	1991			
"New Rose"§	Brian James	"The Spaghetti Incident?"	1993		(Note: "New Rose" was originally recorded by The Damned.)	
"New Work Tune"	Guns N' Roses	Appetite for Destruction Super Deluxe Edition	2018			
"Nice Boys"	Gary Anderson; Mick Cocks; Peter Wells; Gordon Leach; Dallas Royall	Live ?!*@ Like a Suicide	1986		(Note: "Nice Boys" was originally recorded by Rose Tattoo.)	
"Nightrain" †	Guns N' Roses	Appetite for Destruction	1987			
"Nothin'" †	Guns N' Roses	"Nothin'" / "Atlas"	2025		(Note: Working title was "Nothing", a rough demo leaked in 2019, soundchecked in 2025)	
"November Rain" †§	W. Axl Rose	Use Your Illusion I Appetite for Destruction Super Deluxe Edition	1991; 2018		(Note: "November Rain (Piano version / Sound City Sessions 1986)" was released as a promotional single in 2018.)	
"Oh My God"§	W. Axl Rose; Darren Reed; Paul Tobias; Tommy Stinson; Josh Freese; Sean Riggs	End of Days	1999			
"One in a Million"	Guns N' Roses	G N' R Lies	1988			
"Out ta Get Me"	Guns N' Roses	Appetite for Destruction	1987			
"Paradise City" †	Guns N' Roses	Appetite for Destruction	1987			
"Patience" †	Guns N' Roses	G N' R Lies	1988			
"Perfect Crime"	W. Axl Rose; Saul Hudson; Izzy Stradlin	Use Your Illusion I	1991			
"Perhaps" †	Guns N' Roses		2023		(Note: Originally recorded during the Chinese Democracy sessions, full song leaked in 2019, rehearsed at the soundcheck for the Tel Aviv concert in 2023. Reworked and released as a single in 2023.)	
"The Plague"	Guns N' Roses	Appetite for Destruction Super Deluxe Edition	2018			
"Pretty Tied Up (The Perils of Rock n' Roll Decadence)"§	Izzy Stradlin	Use Your Illusion II	1991			
"Prostitute"	W. Axl Rose; Paul Tobias; Robert Finck	Chinese Democracy	2008			
"Raw Power"	Iggy Pop; James Williamson	"The Spaghetti Incident?"	1993		(Note: "Raw Power" was originally recorded by Iggy & the Stooges.)	
"Reckless Life"	Guns N' Roses; Chris Weber	Live ?!*@ Like a Suicide	1986		(Note: Also known as "Wreckless" and "Reckless")	
"Riad N' the Bedouins"	W. Axl Rose; Tommy Stinson; Robert Finck; Darren Reed; Paul Tobias	Chinese Democracy	2008		(Note: working title was "Rhiad", samples "Wherever You Are" and "A Strangely Isolated Place" by Ulrich Schnauss.)	
"Right Next Door to Hell"	W. Axl Rose; Izzy Stradlin; Timo Caltia	Use Your Illusion I	1991			
"Rocket Queen"	Guns N' Roses	Appetite for Destruction	1987			
"Scraped"	W. Axl Rose; Brian Caroll; Caram Costanzo	Chinese Democracy	2008		(Note: "Scraped" is also known as "Lies They Tell".)	
"Shadow of Your Love"	W. Axl Rose; Izzy Stradlin; Paul Tobias	"It's So Easy/Mr. Brownstone"; Guns N' Roses; Appetite for Destruction Super Deluxe Edition	1987; 1988; 2018			
"Shackler's Revenge"	W. Axl Rose; Brian Caroll; Robert Finck; Bryan Mantia; Caram Costanzo; Pete Scaturro	Chinese Democracy	2008		(Note: "Shackler's Revenge" was first released on the video game Rock Band 2, working title was "Shankler's Revenge")	
"Shotgun Blues"	W. Axl Rose	Use Your Illusion II	1991			
"Since I Don't Have You" †	Joseph Rock; James Beaumont; John Taylor; Janet Vogel; Joseph Verscharen; Walter Lester	"The Spaghetti Incident?"	1993		(Note: "Since I Don't Have You" was originally recorded by The Skyliners.)	
"So Fine"§	Duff McKagan	Use Your Illusion II	1991			
"Sorry"	W. Axl Rose; Brian Caroll; Bryan Mantia; Pete Scaturro	Chinese Democracy	2008			
"Street of Dreams"§	W. Axl Rose; Tommy Stinson; Darren Reed; Robert Finck; Paul Tobias	Chinese Democracy	2008		(Note: "Street of Dreams" was originally known as "The Blues")	
"Sweet Child o' Mine" †	Guns N' Roses	Appetite for Destruction	1987			
"Sympathy for the Devil" †	Jagger-Richards	Interview with the Vampire	1994		(Note: "Sympathy for the Devil" was originally recorded by The Rolling Stones.)	
"The Garden"	W. Axl Rose; Aaron Arkeen; Del James	Use Your Illusion I	1991			
"The General"	W. Axl Rose; Saul Hudson; Duff McKagan; Brain; Steve Freeman; Marc Haggard		2023		(Note: Featuring Marco Beltrami on strings, snippet leaked in 2018 and demo leaked in 2023, first played live at The Hollywood Bowl on November 2, 2023 and released digitally and on the vinyl edition of the "Perhaps" single on December 8, 2023.)	
"There Was a Time"	W. Axl Rose; Paul Tobias; Darren Reed; Tommy Stinson	Chinese Democracy	2008		(Note: working title was "TWAT")	
"Think About You"	Guns N' Roses	Appetite for Destruction	1987			
"This I Love"	W. Axl Rose	Chinese Democracy	2008			
"Used to Love Her"	Guns N' Roses	G N' R Lies	1988			
"Welcome to the Jungle" †§	Guns N' Roses	Appetite for Destruction	1987		(Note: "Welcome to the Jungle (1986 Sound City Sessions)" was released as a promotional single in 2018.)	
"Yesterdays" †	W. Axl Rose; Aaron Arkeen; Del James; Billy McCloud	Use Your Illusion II	1991			
"You Ain't the First"	Izzy Stradlin	Use Your Illusion I	1991			
"You Can't Put Your Arms Around a Memory"	John Genzale	"The Spaghetti Incident?"	1993		(Note: "You Can't Put Your Arms Around a Memory" was originally recorded by Johnny Thunders.)	
"You Could Be Mine" †	W. Axl Rose; Izzy Stradlin	Use Your Illusion II	1991			
"You're Crazy"	Guns N' Roses	Appetite for Destruction; G N' R Lies	1987; 1988		(Note: "You're Crazy" was later reworked and released on G N' R Lies.)	

== Unreleased songs ==
=== Appetite for Destruction sessions ===
- "Bring It Down Home" (leaked) (Note: Also known as "Bring It Back Home")
- "Cornshucker" (recorded during the Sound City Studio Sessions produced by Manny Charlton, as well as the GNR Lies sessions, leaked)
- "It Tastes Good, Don't It"
- "Just Another Sunday" (leaked)
- "Too Much Too Fast" (leaked) (Note: Also known as "Too Much Too Soon")
- "Sentimental Movie" (leaked)

=== Use Your Illusion sessions ===
- "A Beer And A Cigarette" (Hanoi Rocks cover, potential use on "The Spaghetti Incident?")
- "Bring It Down Home" (Note: Also known as "Bring It Back Home")
- "Crash Diet" (co-written with West Arkeen, Danny Clarke and Del James, leaked, Recorded by Asphalt Ballet for their second album Pigs (1993) and by Wildside on their 2004 The Wasted Years LP.)
- "Down on the Street" (The Stooges cover, potential use on "The Spaghetti Incident?")
- "It Tastes Good, Don't It"
- "Just Another Sunday"
- "Too Much Too Fast" (Note: Also known as "Too Much Too Soon")
- "Untitled" (played during the Making of Estranged video, later reworked as "Back and Forth Again" on It's Five O'Clock Somewhere by Slash's Snakepit.)

=== Chinese Democracy sessions ===
In 2019, 19 discs of demos and rough mixes from the Chinese Democracy sessions were leaked online after a fan purchased a storage locker (believed to belong to label rep Tom Zutaut) that contained them. Many previously unknown song titles were revealed from the discs, although the titles may be working titles.

- "As It Began" (instrumental leaked in 2019)
- "Better Gone" (a remix of "Better" by Brain, leaked in 2013)
- "Billionaire" (instrumental leaked in 2019)
- "Blood in the Water" (a remix of "Prostitute" by Brain, leaked in 2013)
- "Circus Maximus" (instrumental leaked in 2019)
- "Curly Shuffle" (instrumental leaked in 2019)
- "D Tune" (instrumental leaked in 2019)
- "Devious Bastard" (instrumental leaked in 2019)
- "Down by the Ocean" (co-written by Izzy Stradlin)
- "Dub Suplex" (instrumental leaked in 2019)
- "Dummy" (instrumental leaked in 2019)
- "Eye On You" (leaked in 2019)
- "Going Down" (Note: Also known as "Tommy Demo #2") (sung by Tommy Stinson, leaked in 2013)
- "Ides of March"
- "Inside Out" (instrumental leaked in 2019)
- "Me and My Elvis" (featuring Marco Beltrami, instrumental leaked in 2019)
- "Monsters" (Note: Several working titles existed for the song, including Elvis Presley and the Monster of Soul, The Soul Monster, and Leave Me Alone) (leaked in 2023)
- "Mustache" (instrumental leaked in 2019)
- "Oklahoma (instrumental leaked in 2019)
- "P.R.L." (instrumental leaked in 2019)
- "Prom Violence" (instrumental leaked in 2019)
- "Quick Song" (instrumental leaked in 2019)
- "Realdoll.com" (instrumental leaked in 2019)
- "Seven"
- "State of Grace" (leaked in 2019)
- "The Rebel" (instrumental leaked in 2019)
- "Tommy Demo #1" (Note: Also known as "Ten Percenter") (sung by Tommy Stinson, leaked in 2019)
- "Tonto" (instrumental leaked in 2019)
- "Thyme" (featuring Marco Beltrami, instrumental leaked in 2019)
- "Zodiac 13" (instrumental leaked in 2019)

== See also ==
- Guns N' Roses discography
