= Locomotive (Complicity) =

Song by Guns N' Roses

from the album Use Your Illusion II
- Written: 1989–1990
- Released: September 17, 1991
- Recorded: January 13, 1990 – August 3, 1991
- Studio: A&M (Hollywood); Record Plant (Los Angeles); Studio 56 (Los Angeles); Image Recording (Hollywood); Conway (Los Angeles); Metalworks (Mississauga, Ontario)
- Genre: Funk metal; progressive rock
- Length: 8:42
- Composer: Slash
- Lyricist: Axl Rose
- Producers: Mike Clink; Guns N' Roses

"Locomotive (Complicity)" is a song by the American rock band Guns N' Roses, appearing on their 1991 studio album, Use Your Illusion II. At eight minutes and forty-two seconds, the song is the second longest on the album behind "Estranged".

== Background ==
Manager Doug Goldstein mentioned in a book by Mick Wall about the song "Granted, I was with Slash and Duff when they were writing the music for Use Your Illusion, And 'Locomotive' and 'Coma,' they were doing that shit without Axl's participation. But I'd get these phone calls from the studio, and Axl would say, 'I fucking hate Slash. Have you heard this song 'Locomotive' yet? How the fuck am I supposed to write lyrics to this shit?' I'd go, 'Hey, man, I don't know. That's your gig, right? I do the management. You do the songwriting."

== Personnel ==
- W. Axl Rose – vocals
- Slash – lead guitar, rhythm guitar
- Duff McKagan – bass, percussion
- Matt Sorum – drums, percussion
- Dizzy Reed – piano

== Live performances ==
Guns N' Roses played the song a few times on the Use Your Illusion Tour. They planned to perform the song with Jeff Beck on June 6, 1992, in Paris, but Beck had to pull out due to a severe case of tinnitus. During the Not in This Lifetime... Tour, the band played the song a total of three times.

== Reception ==
The song has been met with positive reviews throughout the years since its release. In 2021, the website Ultimate Classic Rock said this about the song "The band's newfound musical maturity was readily apparent in the haunting, "Layla"-esque coda to "Locomotive," replete with urgent piano chords, Axl Rose's multi-tracked crooning and one last yearning guitar solo from Slash. Bassist Duff McKagan and drummer Matt Sorum anchored the multi-part epic with airtight grooves, showing just how far Guns' rhythm section had come since their Appetite days."

In 2016, Spin ranked the song 4th out of 79 on their rankings of every Guns N' Roses song, saying "No other band could keep a song as big and volatile as this on the tracks — few moments in the GN’R catalog are as suspenseful or stunning as how Axl seems to lose the rhythm on the song’s chugging chorus". The song ranked number 14 on Ultimate Classic Rock's rankings. WMGK ranked the song as number 73 in 2018.
