= Use Your Illusion (disambiguation) =

Use Your Illusion can refer to several works by American hard rock band Guns N' Roses:

- Use Your Illusion I, the first 1991 album
- Use Your Illusion II, the second 1991 album
- Use Your Illusion Tour, a tour to support the release of the above albums
- Use Your Illusion World Tour – 1992 in Tokyo I, a 1992 live video
- Use Your Illusion World Tour – 1992 in Tokyo II, a 1992 live video
- Use Your Illusion, 1998 compilation album
