= Use Your Illusion World Tour – 1992 in Tokyo I =

Video by Guns N' Roses
- Released: December 8, 1992
- Recorded: February 22, 1992
- Venue: Tokyo Dome (Tokyo, Japan)
- Genre: Hard rock
- Length: 84:45
- Label: Geffen Home Video

Guns N' Roses video chronology
Use Your Illusion I and Use Your Illusion II (1991)	Use Your Illusion World Tour I and Use Your Illusion World Tour II (1991)	The "Civil War" EP (1993)

Use Your Illusion World Tour – 1992 in Tokyo I is a live VHS/DVD by American hard rock band Guns N' Roses. Filmed live at Tokyo Dome, Japan, on February 22, 1992, during the Japanese leg of the Use Your Illusion tour, this recording features the first half of the concert, the second half appearing on sister volume Use Your Illusion II. The VHS titles were distributed by Geffen Home Video in 1992.

The concert was originally recorded by Japan Satellite Broadcasting, Inc. for a programme to be aired on their TV channel, and that programme is split between the two DVDs or tapes.

The songs "Pretty Tied Up", "Don't Cry", "November Rain" and the second part of "Patience" from this event were used in the band's 1999 live album Live Era '87–'93.

The cover is similar to the band's single cover used for "Live and Let Die".

The release is certified gold by the RIAA, selling 50,000 copies.

== Track listing ==
1. "Introduction": "Tokyo! Banzai motherfuckers! From Hollywood... Guns N Roses!"
2. "Nightrain"
3. "Mr. Brownstone"
4. "Live and Let Die"
5. "It's So Easy"
6. "Bad Obsession"
7. "Attitude"
8. "Pretty Tied Up"
9. "Welcome to the Jungle"
10. "Don't Cry" (Original)
11. "Double Talkin' Jive"
12. "Civil War"
13. "Wild Horses"/"Patience"
14. "November Rain"

== Reviews ==
Glenn Kenny writing for Entertainment Weekly described the video as "deadly dull" and as having a "wimpy sound mix" before awarding it a 'D' grade (on a scale of A-F, A being the highest). Eamonn McCusker reviewed the DVD version for The Digital Fix, and was also critical of the video's production, describing it as an "uninspired recording". "Many fans will be disappointed with this video," warned Barry Weber for AllMusic, criticizing their tendency to overdo it on stage.

== Credits ==
Uzi Suicide Co.; an original production of TDK Core Co., Ltd. and Japanese Satellite Broadcasting

=== Artists ===
Guns N' Roses:

- W. Axl Rose – lead vocals, piano, whistling
- Slash – lead guitar, backing vocals, slide guitar on "Bad Obsession"
- Duff McKagan – bass, backing vocals, lead vocals on "Attitude"
- Matt Sorum – drums, percussion, backing vocals
- Dizzy Reed – keyboards, percussion, backing vocals
- Gilby Clarke – rhythm guitar, backing vocals

Guests:

- Cece Worrall-Rubin, Lisa Maxwell, Anne King – horns
- Tracey Amos, Roberta Freeman – backing vocals
- Teddy Andreadis – keyboards, harmonica, backing vocals

=== Crew ===
- Director: Paul Becher
- Producers: Shuji Wakai, Tsugihiko Imai, Tamamatsu Kuwata, Ichiro Misu, Yasumi Takeuchi, Noboru Shimasaki, Reiko Nakano, Shigeo Iguro
- Light Design: Phil Ealy
- Sound Engineers: David Kehrer, Jim Mitchell
- Art Director: Kevin Reagan

== Certifications ==
Region	Certification	Certified units/sales
Argentina (CAPIF)	10× Platinum	80,000^{^}
Australia (ARIA)	Platinum	15,000^{^}
Brazil (Pro-Música Brasil)	Gold	25,000^{*}
Canada (Music Canada)	Platinum	10,000^{^}
Germany (BVMI)	Gold	25,000^{^}
Mexico (AMPROFON)	Gold	10,000^{^}
Portugal (AFP)	Silver	
United Kingdom (BPI)	Platinum	50,000^{^}
United States (RIAA)	Gold	50,000^{^}
^{*} Sales figures based on certification alone.^{^} Shipments figures based on certification alone.
