= UYI =

UYI may refer to:

- Neighbourhood Youth Alliance of Iran (United Youth of Iran) - a network of Iranian youth activists created late 2022
- Use Your Illusion - various music and music videos
- Uruguay peso en Unidades Indexadas (URUIURUI, funds code), an ISO4217 registered currency
- University of Yaoundé I – public university in Yaoundé, Cameroon
