= So Fine =

So Fine may refer to:

- So Fine (film), a 1981 movie starring Ryan O'Neal

== Albums ==
- So Fine (Ike & Tina Turner album), 1968
- So Fine (Loggins and Messina album), 1975
- So Fine!, a 1994 album by Finnish band Waltari

== Songs ==
- "So Fine" (Electric Light Orchestra song), 1976
- "So Fine" (Guns N' Roses song), 1991
- "So Fine" (Howard Johnson song), 1982
- "So Fine" (Johnny Otis song), a 1959 song by The Fiestas, covered by many artists
- "So Fine" (Sean Paul song), 2009
- "So Fine", a 1981 song by Chic from the album Take It Off
- "So Fine", a 1993 song by Mint Condition from the album From the Mint Factory
- "So Fine", a 2018 song by Avelino (rapper)
