= Use Your Illusion World Tour – 1992 in Tokyo II =

1992 live VHS/DVD by Guns N' Roses

Video by Guns N' Roses
- Released: December 8, 1992
- Recorded: February 22, 1992
- Venue: Tokyo Dome (Tokyo, Japan)
- Genre: Hard rock; heavy metal
- Length: 74:16
- Label: Geffen Home Video

Guns N' Roses video chronology
Use Your Illusion I and Use Your Illusion II (1991)	Use Your Illusion World Tour I and Use Your Illusion World Tour II (1991)	The "Civil War" EP (1993)

Use Your Illusion World Tour – 1992 in Tokyo II is a live VHS/DVD by American hard rock band Guns N' Roses. Filmed live at the Tokyo Dome, Japan, on February 22, 1992, during the Japanese leg of the Use Your Illusion Tour, this recording features the second half of the concert, the first half appearing on sister volume Use Your Illusion I. Both VHS titles were distributed by Geffen Home Video in 1992.

The songs "You Could Be Mine", "Move to the City" and "Estranged" from this event were used in the band's 1999 live album Live Era '87–'93.

The release is certified gold by the RIAA, selling 50,000 copies.

== Track listing ==
1. "Introduction"
2. "You Could Be Mine"
3. "Drum Solo & Guitar Solo"
4. "Theme from The Godfather"
5. "Sweet Child o' Mine"
6. "So Fine"
7. "Rocket Queen" (w/ "It Tastes Good, Don't It?")
8. "Move to the City"
9. "Knockin' on Heaven's Door"
10. "Estranged"
11. "Paradise City"

== Credits ==
Uzi Suicide Co.; an original production of TDK Core Co., Ltd. and Japanese Satellite Broadcasting

=== Artists ===
Guns N' Roses:

- W. Axl Rose – lead vocals, piano, tambourine, whistle
- Slash – lead guitar, backing vocals, talkbox
- Duff McKagan – bass, timpani, backing vocals, lead vocals
- Matt Sorum – drums, percussion, backing vocals
- Dizzy Reed – keyboards, percussion, backing vocals, tambourine
- Gilby Clarke – rhythm guitar, backing vocals

Guests:

- Cece Worrall-Rubin, Lisa Maxwell, Anne King – horns
- Tracey Amos, Roberta Freeman – backing vocals
- Teddy Andreadis – keyboards, harmonica, backing vocals

=== Crew ===
- Director: Paul Becher
- Producers: Shuji Wakai, Tsugihiko Imai, Tamamatsu Kuwata, Ichiro Misu, Yasumi Takeuchi, Noboru Shimasaki, Reiko Nakano, Shigeo Iguro
- Light Design: Phil Ealy
- Sound Engineers: David Kehrer, Jim Mitchell
- Art Director: Kevin Reagan

== Certifications ==
Region	Certification	Certified units/sales
Argentina (CAPIF)	12× Platinum	96,000^{^}
Australia (ARIA)	Platinum	15,000^{^}
Canada (Music Canada)	Platinum	10,000^{^}
Germany (BVMI)	Gold	25,000^{^}
Mexico (AMPROFON)	Gold	10,000^{^}
Portugal (AFP)	Silver	
United States (RIAA)	Gold	50,000^{^}
^{^} Shipments figures based on certification alone.
