= Nothin' (Guns N' Roses song) =

2025 single by Guns N' Roses

Single by Guns N' Roses
- A-side: "Atlas"
- Released: December 4, 2025
- Length: 4:23
- Label: Geffen / Black Frog
- Songwriter: Guns N' Roses
- Producers: Axl Rose; Caram Costanzo

Guns N' Roses singles chronology
"The General" (2023)	"Nothin'" (2025)	"Atlas" (2025)

"Nothin'" is a song by the American hard rock band Guns N' Roses, released on December 4, 2025.

Like the other singles released since the band's semi-reunion in 2016, it was conceived during the Chinese Democracy recording sessions from the late '90s to the 2000s and reworked with Slash and Duff McKagan after they rejoined the band.

== Background ==
The song first appeared as a leaked rough demo from the "Locker Leaks" in 2019 under the working title "Nothing". The band performed the song at a soundcheck before a concert in May 2025. It was announced as a forthcoming single on November 24, 2025. The song was originally scheduled for release as a single on December 2, 2025, alongside "Atlas", but was "temporarily postponed", according to the record label.

The song features drums from former member Brain.

== Reception ==
Blabbermouth described the song as "grow[ing] more introspective over floaty keys and an emotive guitar." Ultimate Classic Rock said it "blends vintage and modern Guns N' Roses. ..starting on a mellower note with bouncy keyboard melodies and Axl Rose's lovesick croon, the track ... transforms into a full-fledged power ballad, with anthemic choruses and a bluesy solo from Slash", and ranked it third out of the six post-reunion singles, saying "Don't be fooled by the lounge-style keyboards and electronic beats that open.. [it] quickly blossoms into a full-fledged power ballad, rife with massive power chords and anthemic hooks. Slash shines in particular... alternating between aching guitar squalls and fiery solos. As Rose wails atop his expressive outro solo, you can almost picture the Guns N' Roses of yesteryear exploding from your speakers. Revolver said the song has a "more surprising, mildly fuzzy electric piano textures, and features bluesy, bottom-of-the-pool-slick guitar embellishment, but eventually goes Guns-style power ballad. Slash also hits the mile-wide vibrato with his solo." NME described the song as a "rock power ballad with thick, retro-sounding keyboard chords". Billboard compared elements of Slash's solo to Pearl Jam's "Yellow Ledbetter".

== Personnel ==
Credits per Tidal:

Guns N' Roses

- Axl Rose – lead vocals, producer
- Duff McKagan – bass, backing vocals
- Slash – guitar
- Richard Fortus – guitar
- Brain – drums
- Dizzy Reed – keyboards

Additional credits

- Caram Costanzo – keyboards, mixing engineer, producer
- Eric Caudieux – additional engineering

== Charts ==
Chart performance for "Nothin'"
Chart (2025–2026)	Peak position
Belarus Airplay (TopHit)	91
Canada Mainstream Rock (Billboard Canada)	23
Finland Airplay (Radiosoittolista)	91
Italy Airplay (FIMI)	65
Italy Rock Airplay (FIMI)	1
Japan Top Singles Sales (Billboard Japan) with "Atlas"	18
Japan (Oricon) with "Atlas"	16
Japan Rock Singles (Oricon) with "Atlas"	2
UK Singles Sales (OCC)	11
US Rock & Alternative Airplay (Billboard)	21
