= Atlas (Guns N' Roses song) =

2025 single by Guns N' Roses

Single by Guns N' Roses
- A-side: "Nothin'"
- Released: December 4, 2025
- Genre: Hard rock; alternative rock
- Length: 3:58
- Label: Geffen / Black Frog
- Songwriter: Guns N' Roses
- Producers: Axl Rose; Caram Costanzo

Guns N' Roses singles chronology
"Nothin'" (2025)	"Atlas" (2025)

"Atlas" is a song by the American hard rock band Guns N' Roses, released on December 4, 2025.

Like the other singles released since the band's semi-reunion in 2016, it was conceived during the Chinese Democracy recording sessions from the late '90s to 2000s and reworked with Slash and Duff McKagan after they rejoined the band.

== Background ==
The song was initially recorded under the working title "Atlas Shrugged". New York Times reporter Jeff Leeds described it in 2005 as "being somewhere between 70's glam rock and 'November Rain'." The song's original producer Sean Beavan said the song originated with vocalist Axl Rose and technician Billy Howerdell in the MIDI room. Beavan described the lyrics as "really literary", referencing the book Atlas Shrugged. He described Rose telling jokes while warming up for recording the vocals and tying the jokes into the song subject. The original version featured guest guitar work from Queen guitarist Brian May.

The song was considered "finished" in October 2001, however, guitarist Ron "Bumblefoot" Thal states they kept reworking it through the 2000s and it was never really finished. Rose described the title of the song in 2008, saying, "Song doesn't have all that much to do with the book other than trying to do what you believe in and a line about shoulders not being wide enough." Bumblefoot said the song was intended to be released on Chinese Democracy but was a last-second cut due to time constraints with the CD format.

The song first appeared as a demo from the "Locker Leaks" in 2019. The band performed the song at a soundcheck before a concert in May 2025 and it was included on written setlists, but never performed. It was announced as a forthcoming single on November 24, 2025. It was originally scheduled for release as a single on December 2, 2025, alongside "Nothin'", but was "temporarily postponed" according to the record label.

The song features drums from former member Brain and guitar parts from former guitarist Robin Finck.

== Reception ==
Ultimate Classic Rock said the song is "indebted to '90s alt-rock, featuring fiery leads, propulsive drum-and-bass groves and another massive chorus", and ranked the song the best out of the 6 singles released post-reunion, saying "If there's a single song from the crop of post-reunion Guns N' Roses releases that shows how the band could have soldiered on through the '90s with their wits and style intact, it's "Atlas"... [it] preserves GN'R's hard rock instincts but filters them through a '90s alt-rock prism... Rose's vocals are expressive and dynamic, while McKagan delivers nimble bass lines and Slash soars with tasteful leads and solos. On "Atlas", Guns N' Roses finally sound reunited." Revolver said "It plays both brawny and tender, leans into almost Southern-rockin' guitar dynamics, and has Axl Rose yowlin about ambition." NME described it as a "mid-tempo stadium rock tune".

== Personnel ==
Credits per Tidal:

Guns N' Roses

- Axl Rose – lead vocals, producer
- Duff McKagan – bass, backing vocals
- Slash – guitar
- Richard Fortus – guitar
- Robin Finck – guitar
- Brain – drums
- Dizzy Reed – keyboards

Additional credits

- Caram Costanzo – mixing engineer, producer
- Eric Caudieux, Sean Beavan – additional engineering

== Charts ==
Chart performance for "Atlas"
Chart (2025)	Peak position
Japan Top Singles Sales (Billboard Japan) with "Nothin'"	18
Japan (Oricon) with "Nothin'"	16
Japan Rock Singles (Oricon) with "Nothin'"	2
UK Singles Sales (OCC)	82
