= Riverport Riot =

Altercation at a 1991 rock concert in Missouri

The Riverport Riot, also known as the Rocket Queen Riot, took place on July 2, 1991, at the Riverport Amphitheatre (now named Hollywood Casino Amphitheatre) in Maryland Heights, Missouri (near St. Louis) during a concert by American rock band Guns N' Roses on their Use Your Illusion Tour.

== Incident ==
During the band's performance of "Rocket Queen", singer Axl Rose, in the middle of the chorus, pointed out a fan who was taking still pictures of the show, saying, "Hey, take that! Take that! Now, get that guy and take that!" With security unable to confront the person, Rose decided to confiscate the camera himself, saying "I'll take it, goddamn it!" and then jumped into the audience and tackled the person. After taking the camera, Rose struck members of the audience and the security team, and had to be pulled out of the audience by crew members. Rose then grabbed his microphone and said "Well, thanks to the lame-ass security, I'm going home!", angrily slammed his microphone down on the stage and left.

After Rose left, guitarist Slash quickly told the audience, "He just smashed the microphone. We're out of here." This infuriated the audience which set off a three-hour riot in which dozens were injured. The incident was captured on videocamera by Robert John, who was documenting the tour for the band. Rose was charged with having incited the riot, but police were unable to arrest him until almost a year later, because the band had gone overseas to continue the tour. Charges were filed against Rose; however, a judge ruled that he did not directly incite the riot.

"When something like that happens, you can't help but think back to Donington," noted guitarist Izzy Stradlin, referring to the 1988 festival at which two fans died during Guns' set. "What's to stop us having some more people trampled, because the singer doesn't like something?"

Rose later stated that the Guns N' Roses security team had made four separate requests to the venue's security staff to remove the patron with the camera, each of which were ignored. The band also reported that members of the band had been hit by bottles thrown from the audience, the venue's security had allowed weapons into the arena, and the event security had refused to enforce a drinking limit. Consequently, Use Your Illusion I and II's liner notes coarsely said Fuck You, St. Louis! within the acknowledgements section of each album, rather than a traditional 'thank you'.

The band would not appear in the region again until July 27, 2017, when the Not in This Lifetime... Tour played an incident-free show at the Dome at America's Center.
