= Würzburg-Schenkenturm Airfield =

Flugplatz Würzburg-Schenkenturm
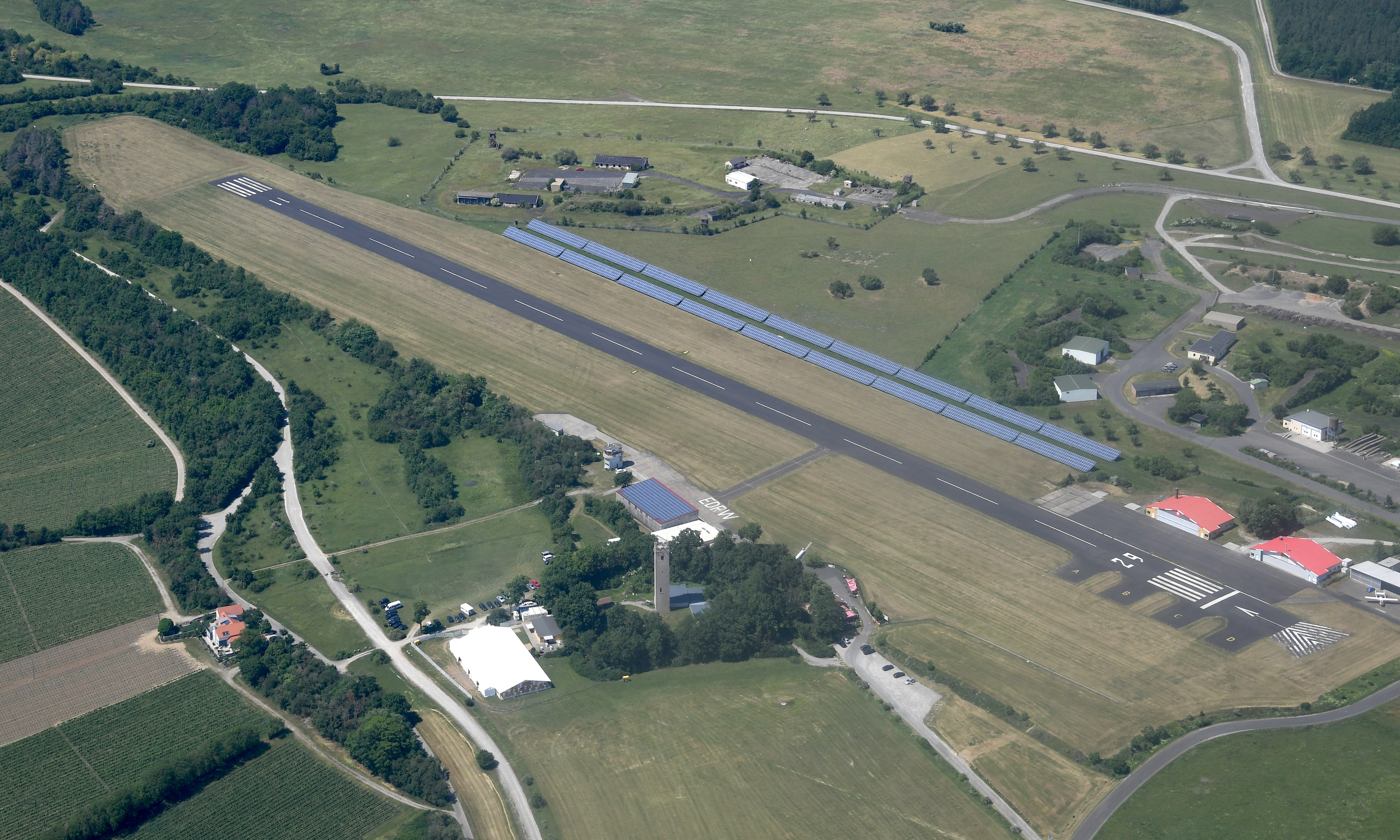
- IATA: none; ICAO: EDFW

Summary
- Airport type: Public
- Owner: Flugsport-Club Würzburg e. V.
- Serves: Würzburg
- Coordinates: 49°49′04″N 009°53′52″E
- Website: www.edfw.de

Map

Runways
Direction	Length		Surface
Direction	m	ft	Surface
11/29	670	2,198	Grooved asphalt

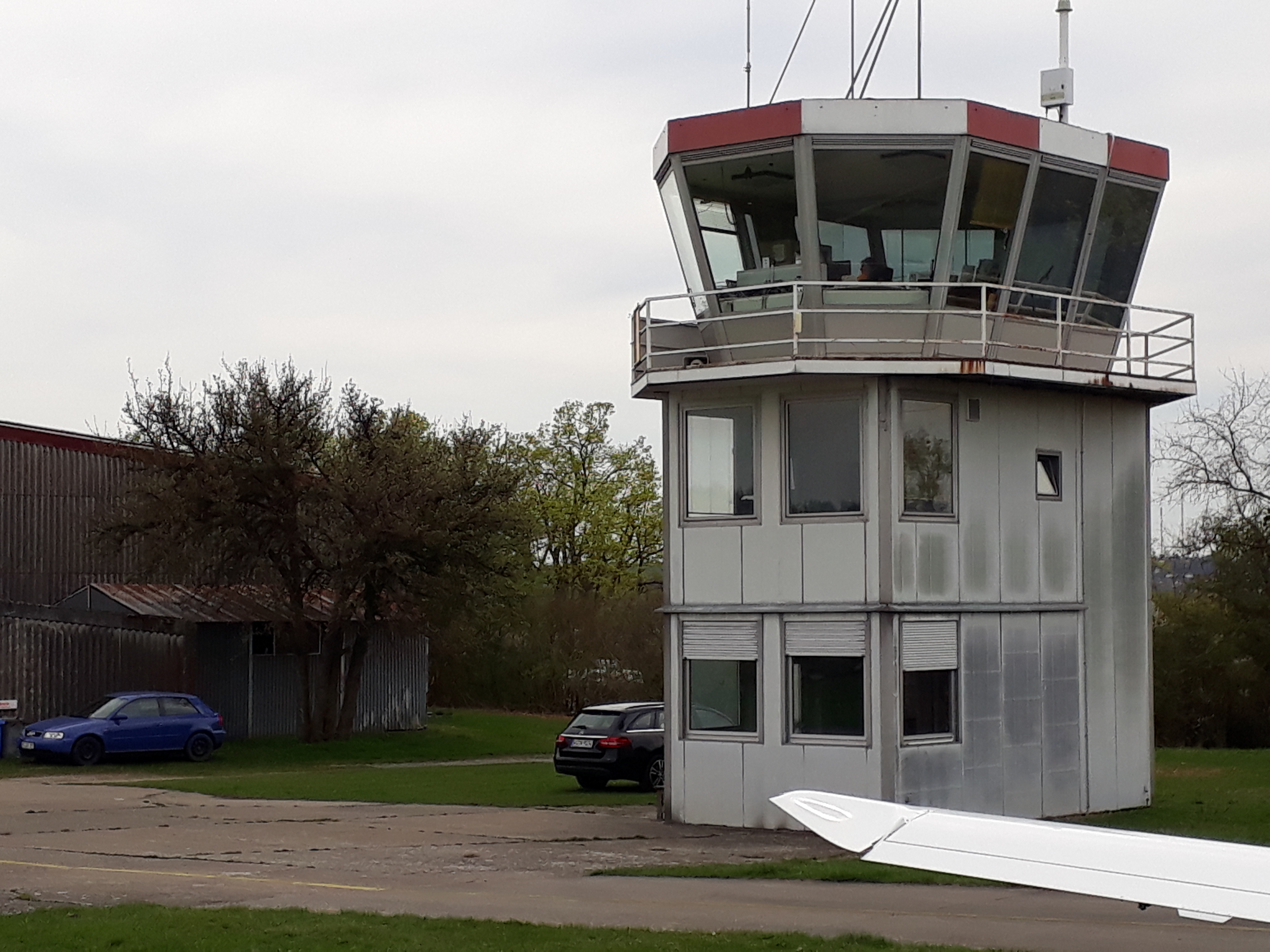
Tower EDFW (2018)

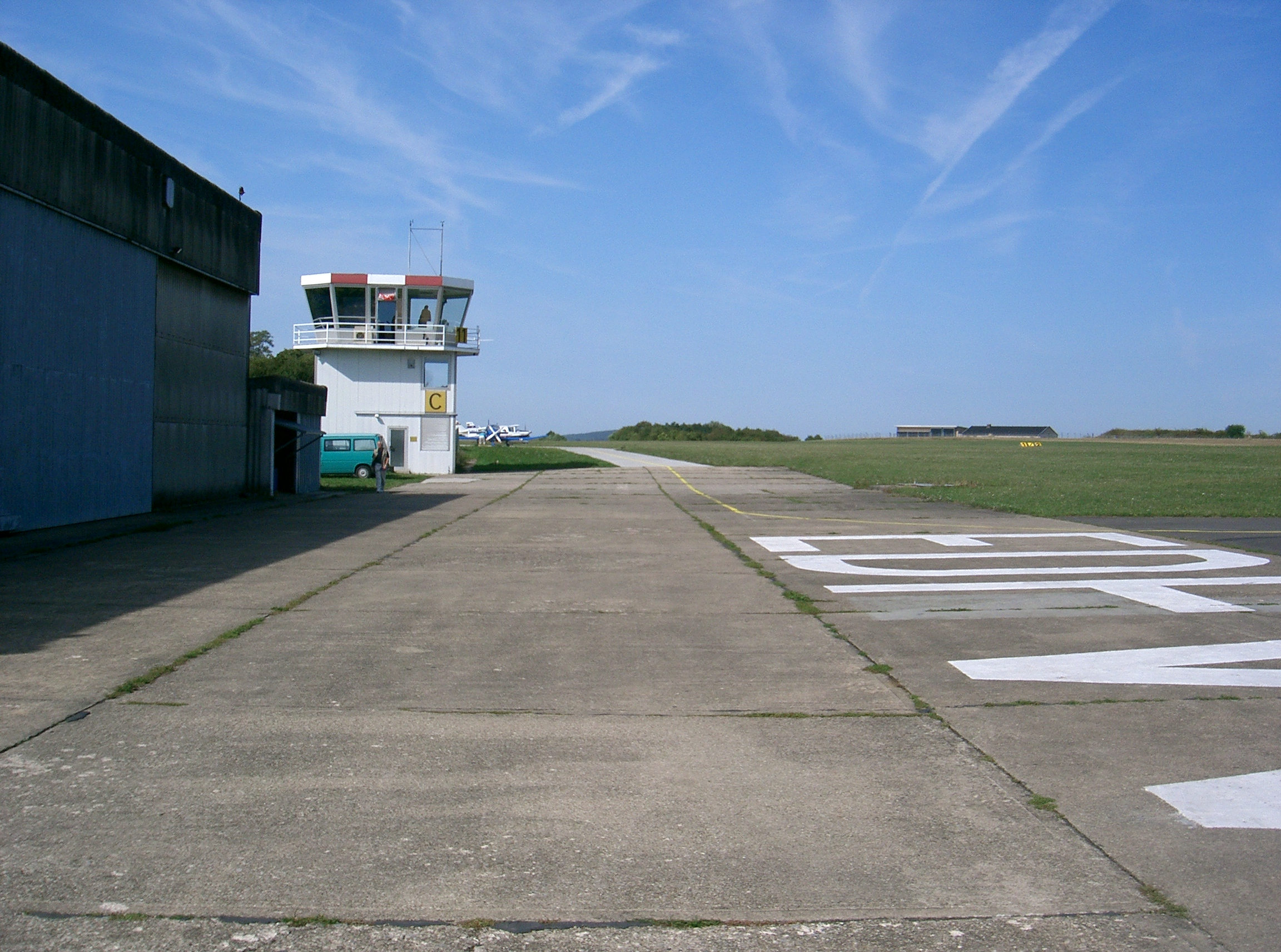
Würzburg-Schenkenturm Airfield, viewed from east (2006)

The Flugplatz Würzburg-Schenkenturm is the airfield of the urban district Würzburg in Unterfranken. It is operated by Flugsport-Club Würzburg e.V..

== Location ==
The airfield lies within the Main triangle, about 3.5 km north-west of the historic city centre of Würzburg. It is located at the land-parcel Guckelesberg at a height of 301m above NN. In the east there are the neighbourhoods Unterdürrbach and Oberdürrbach. 2 km to the west flows the Main river.

== History ==
In 1954 the US Army installed an aerodrome on the Schenkenfeld as replacement for the old field at Galgenberg. In 1961 the city of Würzburg took over Schenkenfeld. In turn the US Army constructed a missile site on the Schenkenfeld. In 1965 a civil co-use of the airfield was permitted. Later the Flugsport-Club Würzburg e.V. took over the operation.

== Aerodrome and equipment ==
The aerodrome is a public airfield for aircraft of all sorts up to 2000 kg maximum takeoff weight and helicopters up to 5700 kg. In the time from March to October operations continue from 8:00 AM to 5:30 PM. In winter operation is allowed in the maximum of half an hour before sunrise and after sunset. About noon from 11:00 PM to 1:00 AM noisy aircraft movements shall be omitted. In the remaining times landings are only possible with prior permission (PPR). The aerodrome is listed with ICAO airport code EDFW.

There are several outbuildings, a tower (132.990 MHz), four hangars, one club house, one restaurant and a filling station with oil service. For gliders there is a ground-based winch launch facility and a tug aircraft.

== Incidents ==
- At April 6, 2011 there was an emergency landing of a Robin HR 200, which contacted the ground wire of a high-voltage power line.
- At April 10, 2016 a Ultralight aviation touched down too late, rolled over the end of the runway and collided with an obstacle. The microlight was heavily damaged, pilot and passenger remained unhurt.
- In the morning of July 9, 2017 a single-engined airplane crashed 60m besides the runway into a tree after a cancelled approach. One person was badly injured. More than 35 rescue forces where in action.
- At August 23, 2019 a shoulder-winged plane of type Cessna 172 with two persons on board, rolled beyond the runway after a cancelled take-off attempt. It caught fire. One occupant was hurt, the machine completely destroyed.
- At September 9, 2019 a small aircraft crashed from few meters height into a nearby forest area. It caught fire. The 62 years old pilot and his passenger, both from Finland, were badly injured.

== Transports ==
The airfield is located north-east of Bundesstraße 27 and cannot be reached directly with public transportation. 1,5 km to the south there is the railway-station Würzburg-Zell with the possibility to board trains of the Main–Spessart railway.

== Notes ==
In German, the aerodrome is classified as a "Verkehrslandeplatz", which corresponds to the ICAO classification "public aerodrome"; which mainly implies that it is bound to operate according to a published timetable. Confusingly, it says nothing about access rights.
