= Get in the Ring =

Song by Guns N' Roses

from the album Use Your Illusion II
- Released: September 17, 1991
- Recorded: June 9–10, 1991
- Studio: Metalworks Recording Studios
- Genre: Hard rock; heavy metal
- Length: 5:41
- Label: Geffen
- Songwriter(s): Duff McKagan; Slash; Axl Rose
- Producer(s): Mike Clink; Guns N' Roses

"Get in the Ring" is the fifth song on the Guns N' Roses album Use Your Illusion II. Written by Axl Rose, Duff McKagan and Slash, it is a diss track directed at music critics. Mentioned by name are critics from Hit Parader (Andy Secher), Circus, Kerrang! (Mick Wall) and Spin (Bob Guccione, Jr.).

== Background ==
The song was originally written by McKagan as "Why Do You Look at Me When You Hate Me?", which is its first line. In the interview that precipitated Mick Wall's mention in the song (see below), Rose said: "I've brought in an album. Duff brought in one song. It's called 'Why Do You Look At Me When You Hate Me?' and it's just bad-assed. And I wrote a bunch of words to that." The song was then going to be titled "Get in the Ring Motherfucker" but that was changed too.

At the time of the song's release, Mick Wall of Kerrang! was thought to have been mentioned because of his book Guns N' Roses: The Most Dangerous Band in the World, which was a no holds barred collection of interviews and stories about the band. Wall denies this, and claims the real reason was an interview he conducted in early 1990 for Kerrang! that included Rose's threat to harm Vince Neil of Mötley Crüe after an incident involving Neil's then-wife and Izzy Stradlin.

The song suggests that Bob Guccione, Jr.'s father (founder of Penthouse magazine) "gets more pussy" than Guccione Jr. The younger Guccione responded in a letter to Rose, saying he accepted the challenge to a fight and could use the promotion to help sell magazines. Rose did not respond to Guccione, who had nine years of fight training at the time.

"Get in the Ring" is notorious for its amount of swearing.

== Recording ==
The chants of "Guns. And. Roses" and "Get in the ring" were recorded with the audience at a Saratoga Springs concert on June 10, 1991.

== Personnel ==
- W. Axl Rose – lead vocals, production
- Slash – lead guitar, production
- Izzy Stradlin – rhythm guitar, production
- Duff McKagan – bass, co-lead vocals, production
- Matt Sorum – drums, production
- Dizzy Reed – piano, production
