= Pretty Tied Up =

Single by Guns N' Roses

Promotional single by Guns N' Roses

from the album Use Your Illusion II
- Released: 1992
- Recorded: 1990–1991
- Studio: A&M (Hollywood); Record Plant (Los Angeles); Studio 56 (Los Angeles); Image Recording (Hollywood); Conway (Los Angeles); Metalworks (Mississauga, Ontario)
- Genre: Hard rock
- Length: 4:46
- Label: Geffen
- Songwriter: Izzy Stradlin
- Producers: Mike Clink; Guns N' Roses

"Pretty Tied Up" (subtitled "The Perils of Rock n Roll Decadence") is a song by the rock band Guns N' Roses. Written by rhythm guitarist Izzy Stradlin, it appears on the band's 1991 album Use Your Illusion II. The song opens with the sounds of a coral sitar played by Stradlin.

Stradlin's lyrics may have been inspired by a bondage encounter with a dominatrix and her client, which he described in an interview:

My Mexican friend Tony took me to meet this woman named Margot at her house. She gave us some tequila or something and she goes in the bedroom and we walk in and there's this big fat naked guy with an onion in his mouth. He's wearing women's underwear and high heels and he's tied up with duct tape against the wall. Me and Tony were like, What the fuck is going on here? Cracking up laughing. She was this dominatrix chick.

Slash has stated that the song was written one night at Stradlin's house, before the band went to Chicago to write. According to Slash, Stradlin was so high on heroin that night that he made a sitar out of a cymbal, a broomstick and some strings, thus serving as the inspiration for the sitar heard at the beginning of the track.

The song was first played live at the Rock in Rio 2 festival on January 20, 1991 and a live version of the song was released on the album Live Era: '87-'93.

== Personnel ==
- W. Axl Rose – lead vocals, production
- Slash – lead guitar, production
- Izzy Stradlin – rhythm guitar, coral sitar, production
- Duff McKagan – bass, production
- Matt Sorum – drums, production
- Dizzy Reed – piano, production

== Charts ==
| Chart (1992) | Peak position |
|---|---|
| US Mainstream Rock (Billboard) | 35 |
