= Circus (magazine) =

American rock music magazine, Gerald Rothberg founder owner editor publisher

- Jimi Hendrix on the March 1969 Circus cover
- Editor: Gerald Rothberg
- Categories: Music
- Frequency: Monthly
- First issue: October 1966 (Hullabaloo); March 1969 (Circus)
- Final issue: May 2006
- Country: United States
- Language: English
- Website: https://www.officialcircusmagazine.com/
- ISSN: 0009-7365

Circus was a monthly American magazine devoted to rock music. It was published from October 1966 to May 2006. The magazine had a full-time editorial staff that were prolific in rock journalism, such as Paul Nelson, Judy Wieder, David Fricke, and Kurt Loder. It rivaled Rolling Stone in sales and surpassed Creem. In 1974, a sister publication was launched, titled Circus Raves, and by 1977 that venture had been merged into Circus magazine, making Circus a biweekly publication.

Gerald Rothberg originally published the magazine under the name Hullabaloo in 1966 (23 issues), before changing the name to Circus in 1969.

In its early years, it covered hard rock acts like the Doors and Grand Funk Railroad. Patti Smith wrote for Circus, as did her bandmate Lenny Kaye. Rock critic Kurt Loder was also a contributor, as was Lance Loud of An American Family fame. A Circus reader could look forward to music reviews penned by Ed Naha, whose entire review of an album by the German rock group Can consisted of exactly one word: "Can’t". Despite the era’s printing constraints, the magazine included high-quality color photography.

In 1971, Howard Bloom joined Circus as editor, his tenure lasting until August 1973.

In the late 1970s, the magazine started focusing on pop culture as a weekly in the vein of People Magazine. The magazine gradually shifted to heavy metal acts in the early and mid-1980s, then began focusing coverage on glam metal groups like Bon Jovi and Def Leppard in the mid-to-late 1980s.

As the 1990s progressed, Rothberg changed the longtime design and logo of the magazine, reduced the staff complement, and made use of freelance writers. It was during this period that Rothberg was attacked in the Guns N' Roses song "Get in the Ring".

Before the magazine ceased publication in May 2006, Circus covered contemporary heavy metal, competing against magazines like Kerrang and Hit Parader.
