= Mick Wall =

British music journalist and writer

- Born: 23 June 1958 (age 67)
- Occupations: Music journalist, author
- Years active: 1976–present
- Known for: Kerrang!, Classic Rock, Metal Hammer

Mick Wall (born 23 June 1958) is a British music journalist, author, and radio and TV presenter. He has been described as "the world's leading rock and metal writer".

== Career ==
Wall began his career in 1976 at the age of 18, contributing to the music weekly magazine Sounds, where he wrote about punk rock and new wave, and then rockabilly, funk, new romantic and eventually hard rock and heavy metal. In 1979, at the age of 21 he left music journalism to become the partner in his own PR firm Heavy Publicity, where he oversaw press campaigns for artists such as Black Sabbath, Journey, REO Speedwagon, Thin Lizzy, Ultravox, the Damned, Dire Straits and several others. In the early 1980s, he also worked at Virgin Records as a press officer for bands including Gillan, the Human League, Simple Minds, Japan and others.

In 1983, Wall become one of the main journalists of Kerrang! magazine, where he was their star cover story writer until 1992. In 1985, he began hosting several music video shows and interviews on Sky Channel, including Sky Trax and the heavy metal show Monsters of Rock until 1988, when the channel changed its music format and became the news network Sky News in 1989. He subsequently became the founding editor of Classic Rock magazine from 1998 to 2004, 10 years prior he had presented his own television and radio shows on Sky TV (Monsters of Rock), Capital Radio, BBC GLR, BBC Radio 1, Planet Rock and others. Since then, he has also guested on several television programmes and documentaries on BBC TV, ITV, Sky One, Channel Four and MTV.

Wall has written many biographies of musicians and bands including Ozzy Osbourne, Iron Maiden, AC/DC, Metallica and Guns N' Roses. The latter mentioned him in their song "Get in the Ring" after Wall fell out with his former friend, singer Axl Rose. In April 2016, Wall made an impassioned apology to Rose, acknowledging that the spirit of the book he had written on Axl Rose ten years earlier was "mean, disgruntled, unworthy. I'm sorry I wrote it." He concluded by saying, "I can't wait to see what Axl Rose and Guns N' Roses do next. They are the last of the giants and I am a fan."

His book Paranoid: Black Days With Sabbath & Other Horror Stories (1999) is a semi-fictionalised account of his substance-abusing days in the 1980s, working with some of the biggest rock stars in the world. In 2008, he wrote a biography of Led Zeppelin, entitled When Giants Walked the Earth.

Wall was also the author of a blog on his official website, consisting of a compendium of domestic affairs and anecdotes from his past (2006–2014). He deleted his website in 2020. "I was sooo bored with it and nobody looks at websites anymore anyway," he said. Instead, he has his official Facebook page, his personal Facebook page, the Dead Rock Stars Facebook page and his Twitter/X account. He also co-hosted a podcast called "Dead Rock Stars" with fellow writer Joel McIver, which ran for 23 episodes in 2018. In June 2018, The Guardian named "Dead Rock Stars" their podcast of the week. In 2020, Wall teamed up with podcast network, NoFilter Media, to launch "Getcha Rocks Off" podcast. His book, Two Riders Were Approaching: The Life & Death of Jimi Hendrix (Trapeze) is his most controversial, opening as it does on the first page an imagined account of the murder of Hendrix. The book is written in a novelistic style which Classic Rock said "does for Hendrix what James Ellroy did for the story of JF Kennedy, another murdered rock star."

== Bibliography ==
- Diary Of A Madman – The Official Biography of Ozzy Osbourne, Zomba Books, 1986
- Market Square Heroes – The Authorized Biography of Marillion, Sidgwick & Jackson, 1987
- Guns N' Roses: The Most Dangerous Band In The World, Sidgwick & Jackson, 1991
- Pearl Jam, Sidgwick & Jackson, 1994
- All Night Long: The True Story of Jon Bon Jovi, Omnibus Press, 1995
- Run To The Hills: The Authorised Biography of Iron Maiden, Sanctuary Books, 1998
- Paranoid: Black Days With Sabbath & Other Horror Stories. Mainstream, 1999
- Mr Big: Ozzy, Sharon and My Life as the Godfather of Rock, Robson Books, 2004 (written with Don Arden)
- XS All Areas: the Autobiography of Status Quo, Sidgwick & Jackson, 2004 (written with Francis Rossi and Rick Parfitt)
- John Peel – A Tribute To The Legendary DJ and Broadcaster, Orion Books, 2004
- Bono: In The Name Of Love, Andre Deutsch, 2005
- Star Trippin': The Best Of Mick Wall 1985–91, M&G, 2006
- W. Axl Rose: The Unauthorised Biography, Sidgwick & Jackson, 2007
- When Giants Walked the Earth: A Biography of Led Zeppelin, Orion Books, 2008
- Osbournes Confidential: An Insider's Chronicle, JR Books, 2008
- Appetite For Destruction: Legendary Encounters With Mick Wall, Orion Books, 2010
- Enter Night – Metallica: The Biography, Orion Books, 2010
- AC/DC – Hell Ain't A Bad Place To Be, Orion Books, 2012
- Black Sabbath: Symptom of the Universe, Orion Books, 2013
- Lou Reed: The Life, Orion Books, 2013
- Love Becomes A Funeral Pyre: The Biography of The Doors, Orion Books, 2014
- Black Sabbath: Symptom of the Universe St. Martin's Press, 2015
- Getcha Rock's Off: Sex & Excess. Bust Up's & Binges. Life & Death on the Rock N' Roll Road, Orion Books, 2015
- Foo Fighters : Learning to Fly, Orion Books, 2015
- Lemmy : The Definitive Biography, Orion Books, 2016
- Last of the Giants: The True Story of Guns N' Roses, Trapeze, 2016
- Like a Bat Out of Hell: The Larger than Life story of Meat Loaf, Trapeze, 2017
- Steven Wilson: Limited Edition of One: How to Succeed in the Music Industry Without Being Part of the Mainstream, Constable Books, 2022
