= So Fine (Guns N' Roses song) =

Promotional single by Guns N' Roses

from the album Use Your Illusion II
- Released: 1992
- Genre: Art rock; hard rock; heavy metal
- Length: 4:09
- Label: Geffen
- Songwriter: Duff McKagan
- Producers: Mike Clink; Guns N' Roses

"So Fine" is a song by the American rock band Guns N' Roses, released as a promotional single in 1992. It features bassist Duff McKagan on lead vocals, with Axl Rose singing the intro song's verses. The song, written entirely by McKagan, is a tribute to Johnny Thunders.

McKagan regularly sang the song during the Use Your Illusion Tour. The song was rehearsed during a soundcheck while Duff was guesting with Guns N' Roses during their Appetite for Democracy 2014 tour, but wasn't played live. The song made a reappearance after a 27-year absence during the Guns N' Roses 2020 Tour.

McKagan followed this up with a second tribute to Thunders, recording all the instruments and lead vocals on the cover of his "You Can't Put Your Arms Around a Memory" on GnR's next album, "The Spaghetti Incident?".

== Reception ==
Spin complimented McKagan's vocals when reviewing the song, comparing it to Ziggy Stardust-era David Bowie.

== Personnel ==
Guns N' Roses

- W. Axl Rose – backing vocals, intro lead vocals
- Slash – lead guitar
- Izzy Stradlin – rhythm guitar, backing vocals
- Duff McKagan – lead vocals, bass
- Matt Sorum – drums, backing vocals

Additional musicians

- Howard Teman – piano
