= Use Your Illusion Tour =

1991–93 concert tour by Guns N' Roses

- World tour by Guns N' Roses
- Promotional poster for the 1992 leg of the tour
- Location: Asia; Europe; North America; Oceania; South America
- Associated album: Use Your Illusion I; Use Your Illusion II
- Start date: January 20, 1991
- End date: July 17, 1993
- Legs: 9
- No. of shows: 192 (209 scheduled)
- Box office: $63.8 million (106 shows)

Guns N' Roses concert chronology
- Appetite for Destruction Tour (1987–1988); Use Your Illusion Tour (1991–1993); Chinese Democracy Tour (2001–2011)

The Use Your Illusion Tour was a concert tour by the American hard rock band Guns N' Roses which ran from January 20, 1991, to July 17, 1993. It was not only the band's longest tour, but one of the longest concert tours in rock history, consisting of 192 shows in 27 countries. It was also a source of much infamy for the band, due to riots, late starts, cancellations and outspoken rantings by Axl Rose.

== History ==
The Use Your Illusion Tour was a promotional tour for the albums Use Your Illusion I and Use Your Illusion II. The tour started on May 24, 1991, approximately when the long-awaited follow-up to G N' R Lies was to be released, and ended over two years later. The release date of the album, or albums, since there were now two of them, was pushed back to September but the tour began as originally scheduled. The tour marked a high point in the popularity of Guns N' Roses, with a total of over 7 million fans attending, and accompanied by high worldwide album sales.

Live recordings from the tour would be issued as a two video/DVD set, Use Your Illusion I and II (featuring footage from a 1992 concert in Tokyo, Japan) and provide content for the 2-disc set Live Era: '87-'93. The tour also provided footage for music videos, including "Dead Horse" and their popular cover of Paul McCartney's "Live and Let Die". A planned documentary, titled The Perfect Crime, included footage consisted of the band's time on the road, concert clips, and information about the riots and other major events of the tour. It was never released and never spoken about after the tour. Slash mentioned in his biography that Axl Rose controls the footage and that Slash would be interested in viewing it, as he thought it captured "killer moments" from the tour.

The conduct of the band, and particularly Axl Rose, during the Use Your Illusion Tour generated negative press, notably from the magazines Spin, Kerrang!, Circus, and Hit Parader. These magazines were mentioned in the song "Get in the Ring" where Axl Rose attacked writers who had written negative articles dealing with Rose's attitude.

The shows were all varied, as a setlist was never chosen by the band. They did, however, usually open with "Welcome to the Jungle", "It's So Easy", "Nightrain" or "Perfect Crime" and would shortly after one another play "Mr. Brownstone" or "Live and Let Die", and close with "Paradise City". Each show featured guitar solos from Slash (including the "Theme From the Godfather") and a drum solo from drummer Matt Sorum, usually six minutes in length.

The tour was massive not just in the number and size of performances, but also in its technical aspects and the size of the crew. A total of 130 working personnel traveled with the band, using two different stages to enable faster setup. The trade magazine Performance named the tour crew "Crew of the Year" for 1991.

Duff McKagan revealed in 2015 that the band didn't make profit on the tour until 1993 due to the extravagant costs.

"The band had such a ball," Slash remarked in 1994. "We managed to tour for two and a half years, against all the fuckin' odds. It really was a fuckin' endurance test of pretty big proportions."

== Notable events ==
At the June 10, 1991, show, at the Saratoga Performing Arts Center, Axl Rose requested that the crowd chant "Get in the ring!" This was recorded for the song of that name on Use Your Illusion II.

On June 13, 1991, during the show in Philadelphia, Rose erupted after a fan fought with Guns N' Roses' photographer Robert John. When the fan kicked the camera out of his hands, Rose cursed him out and challenged him to a fight. After the fan was ejected from the concert, the show continued.

On Tuesday, July 2, 1991, at a show at the Riverport Amphitheatre in Maryland Heights, Missouri, near St. Louis, Rose spotted a spectator recording the concert with a video camera and jumped into the audience after him when concert security failed to respond to his request to apprehend the man. Returning to the stage, Rose declared: "Well, thanks to the lame-ass security, I'm going home!" then slammed the mic on the stage, sparking the Riverport riot. Rose then stormed off the stage; some people thought when he slammed the mic, because of the noise, that he shot someone. Slash told them, "He just slammed his mic on the floor. We're outta here." He proceeded to throw his guitar pick into the crowd and follow Rose. The band followed. The band was looking to come back out and finish the show, but as police and security tried to calm down the audience, a riot broke out. The footage was captured by Robert John who was documenting the entire tour. Sixty fans were injured. The band lost most of their equipment and Rose was charged with inciting a riot. He was acquitted due to lack of evidence. The band would later express their feelings regarding the incident by including the message "fuck you, St. Louis!" in the liner notes of both Use Your Illusion albums.

On August 3, 1991, the day mixing of the Illusion albums was finished, the band played the longest show of the tour at the L.A. Forum. It lasted three and a half hours.

On November 7, 1991, Izzy Stradlin quit the band after the release of Use Your Illusion I and Use Your Illusion II; his last show was on August 31, 1991, at Wembley Stadium. On December 5, replacement rhythm guitarist Gilby Clarke made his debut in Worcester, at the first show after the release of Use Your Illusion I and Use Your Illusion II.

On April 13 and 14, 1992, two concerts had to be canceled when a warrant was issued for Rose's arrest due to his behavior at the St. Louis show.

On April 20, 1992, the band performed at the Freddie Mercury Tribute Concert, an effort for AIDS Awareness in London. The band was a controversial addition to the lineup, as many in the gay community were still angry over Rose using a homophobic slur in "One in a Million." The band opened with "Paradise City" and closed with "Knockin' on Heaven's Door." During the famous "Paradise City" opening, Axl pointed at protesters in the audience and yelled, "SHOVE IT!" He had planned to address the controversy between songs, but was asked not to by the band as it would pull the spotlight from Queen and Freddie Mercury. As Slash concluded a short cover of Alice Cooper's "Only Women Bleed", Duff McKagan kept an eye on Rose, who approached the front of the stage. When Slash finished the song, then strummed the beginning of "Knockin' on Heaven's Door", McKagan walked over to Rose and shook his hand in appreciation. Later in the show, Slash joined Joe Elliott of Def Leppard and the surviving members of Queen for "Tie Your Mother Down." Rose sang "We Will Rock You" and finished "Bohemian Rhapsody" with Elton John and Queen. The show was broadcast live around the world via satellite, gathering the largest audience for a music concert in history.

On November 30, 1992, the band performed for the first time in Bogotá, Colombia. When they started to play "November Rain", a soft rain fell over the city and stopped right after they finished the song. Rose later stated this was a special moment for him because "November Rain" was #1 in Colombia for 60 weeks. Rose stated that the band were at risk of electrocution and must stop to dry the stage. The band moved backstage and returned to finish with "Don't Cry" and "Paradise City."

On December 2, 1992, the band performed in Santiago, Chile, at Estadio Nacional in front of 85,535 people, breaking an attendance record in the stadium. At their arriving at Chile, Rose attacked some graphic reporters and a cameraman was injured. Before the concert, Rose got drunk and arrived at the stadium two hours late. While the band performed "Civil War" some people threw bottles to the stage, and Rose stopped four minutes into the show, ejecting an audience member. The concert ended with 50 people arrested outside the stadium, and a teenage fan with several injuries, dying two days later.

On February 1, 1993, the band performed at the Calder Park Raceway in Melbourne, Victoria, Australia. The concert started late due to earlier heavy rain, with minimal shelter available for those attending. The concert was fraught with controversy, including reports that security staff had prohibited patrons from bringing their own food, drinks and sunscreen into the venue; this most seriously affected a diabetic teenage girl, whose medication and carefully portioned food were confiscated. The weather was very hot on that day, reportedly 42 °C (108 °F), and reportedly 1000 people were treated for heat-related illness. Many concertgoers went to the venue on special shuttle buses, which left the venue shortly after Guns N' Roses performed their final song. This, combined with a refusal to extend train timetables, left many concertgoers stranded. There are reports that they walked all the way down the Calder Highway back to Melbourne, looting a 7-Eleven on the highway for food. An inquiry into the conditions was held, with the findings published by Ombudsman Victoria in May 1993.

In February 1993, Gilby Clarke told BBC Radio 1's Friday Rock Show: "For the last year and a half, we had a film crew with us. They do film every show and things backstage: hotel rooms, everything. And what we're gonna do at the end of the whole tour – which is actually after we're done in Europe – is put it all together, and we are gonna make a movie. It's pretty candid right now, so it's gonna be really great. The difference between ours and Madonna's is that ours isn't scripted. This movie is actually things that are happening around us." He also said Guns N' Roses would record an MTV Unplugged during their stay in Russia. Neither of these plans came to fruition.

On April 3 1993, in Sacramento, the concert was abruptly ended after an audience member hit McKagan with a urine filled bottle forcing him to be hospitalized. Rose informed the audience and angrily walked off. A few minutes later Slash further addressed the audience about the situation. To prevent another riot from occurring, he told the audience to leave without any violence or hostility towards any of the crew, staff or audience members.

Stradlin returned for several shows in 1993, deputizing for an injured Clarke. "It was weird," he recalled. "We toured Greece, Istanbul, London. I liked that side of it – seeing some places I'd never seen… [But] money was a big sore point. I did the dates just for salary… [At the end] I didn't actually say 'See you', cos they were all fucked up… It was like playing with zombies."

On July 17, 1993, the band performed in Buenos Aires, Argentina at River Plate Stadium in front of 80,000 people. It was their last show with most of the Use Your Illusion-era lineup (Rose, Slash, McKagan, Sorum, Reed, and Clarke). The tour was renamed the "Skin N' Bones Tour" for the last couple of legs and included an unplugged performance in a living room set. A highlight of the night was Cozy Powell dressed as a Domino's Pizza delivery boy playing drums with Sorum.

== Tour dates ==
List of 1991 concerts
Date	City	Country	Venue
January 20, 1991	Rio de Janeiro	Brazil	Maracanã Stadium
January 23, 1991	Rio de Janeiro	Brazil	Maracanã Stadium
May 9, 1991	San Francisco	United States	Warfield Theatre
May 11, 1991	Los Angeles	United States	Pantages Theatre
May 16, 1991	New York City	United States	The Ritz
May 24, 1991	East Troy	United States	Alpine Valley Music Theatre
May 25, 1991	East Troy	United States	Alpine Valley Music Theatre
May 28, 1991	Noblesville	United States	Deer Creek Music Center
May 29, 1991	Noblesville	United States	Deer Creek Music Center
June 1, 1991	Grove City	United States	Capital Music Center
June 2, 1991	Toledo	United States	Toledo Speedway
June 4, 1991	Richfield	United States	Richfield Coliseum
June 5, 1991	Richfield	United States	Richfield Coliseum
June 7, 1991	Toronto	Canada	CNE Grandstand
June 8, 1991	Toronto	Canada	CNE Grandstand
June 10, 1991	Saratoga Springs	United States	Saratoga Performing Arts Center
June 11, 1991	Hershey	United States	Hersheypark Stadium
June 13, 1991	Philadelphia	United States	The Spectrum
~~June 15, 1991~~	Bristol	United States	Lake Compounce
June 17, 1991	Uniondale	United States	Nassau Veterans Memorial Coliseum
June 19, 1991	Landover	United States	Capital Centre
June 20, 1991	Landover	United States	Capital Centre
~~June 21, 1991~~	Bristol	United States	Bristol Motor Speedway
June 22, 1991	Hampton	United States	Hampton Coliseum
June 23, 1991	Charlotte	United States	Charlotte Coliseum
June 25, 1991	Greensboro	United States	Greensboro Coliseum
June 26, 1991	Knoxville	United States	Thompson–Boling Arena
June 29, 1991	Lexington	United States	Rupp Arena
June 30, 1991	Birmingham	United States	Birmingham Race Course
July 2, 1991	Maryland Heights	United States	Riverport Amphitheatre
~~July 3, 1991~~	Maryland Heights	United States	Riverport Amphitheatre
~~July 4, 1991~~	Tinley Park	United States	World Music Theater
~~July 6, 1991~~	Bonner Springs	United States	Sandstone Amphitheater
July 8, 1991	Dallas	United States	Coca-Cola Starplex Amphitheatre
July 9, 1991	Dallas	United States	Coca-Cola Starplex Amphitheatre
July 11, 1991	Denver	United States	McNichols Sports Arena
July 12, 1991	Greenwood Village	United States	Fiddler's Green Amphitheatre
July 13, 1991	Salt Lake City	United States	Salt Palace Arena
July 16, 1991	Tacoma	United States	Tacoma Dome
July 17, 1991	Tacoma	United States	Tacoma Dome
July 19, 1991	Mountain View	United States	Shoreline Amphitheatre
July 20, 1991	Mountain View	United States	Shoreline Amphitheatre
July 23, 1991	Sacramento	United States	ARCO Arena
July 25, 1991	Costa Mesa	United States	Pacific Amphitheatre
~~July 26, 1991~~	Costa Mesa	United States	Pacific Amphitheatre
July 29, 1991	Inglewood	United States	Great Western Forum
July 30, 1991	Inglewood	United States	Great Western Forum
August 2, 1991	Inglewood	United States	Great Western Forum
August 3, 1991	Inglewood	United States	Great Western Forum
August 13, 1991	Helsinki	Finland	Helsinki Ice Hall
August 14, 1991	Helsinki	Finland	Helsinki Ice Hall
August 16, 1991	Stockholm	Sweden	Globen
August 17, 1991	Stockholm	Sweden	Globen
August 19, 1991	Copenhagen	Denmark	Forum Copenhagen
~~August 21, 1991~~	Oslo	Norway	Oslo Spectrum
August 24, 1991	Mannheim	Germany	Maimarktgelände
August 31, 1991	London	England	Wembley Stadium
December 5, 1991	Worcester	United States	Worcester Centrum
December 6, 1991	Worcester	United States	Worcester Centrum
December 9, 1991	New York City	United States	Madison Square Garden
December 10, 1991	New York City	United States	Madison Square Garden
December 13, 1991	New York City	United States	Madison Square Garden
December 16, 1991	Philadelphia	United States	The Spectrum
December 17, 1991	Philadelphia	United States	The Spectrum
December 28, 1991	St. Petersburg	United States	Suncoast Dome
December 31, 1991	Miami Gardens	United States	Joe Robbie Stadium

List of 1992 concerts
Date	City	Country	Venue
January 3, 1992	Baton Rouge	United States	LSU Assembly Center
January 4, 1992	Biloxi	United States	Mississippi Coast Coliseum
January 7, 1992	Memphis	United States	Pyramid Arena
January 9, 1992	Houston	United States	The Summit
January 10, 1992	Houston	United States	The Summit
January 13, 1992	Fairborn	United States	Nutter Center
January 14, 1992	Fairborn	United States	Nutter Center
January 21, 1992	Minneapolis	United States	Target Center
January 22, 1992	Minneapolis	United States	Target Center
January 25, 1992	Paradise	United States	Thomas & Mack Center
January 27, 1992	San Diego	United States	San Diego Sports Arena
January 28, 1992	San Diego	United States	San Diego Sports Arena
January 31, 1992	Chandler	United States	Compton Terrace
February 1, 1992	Chandler	United States	Compton Terrace
February 19, 1992	Tokyo	Japan	Tokyo Dome
February 20, 1992	Tokyo	Japan	Tokyo Dome
February 22, 1992	Tokyo	Japan	Tokyo Dome
April 1, 1992	Mexico City	Mexico	Palacio de los Deportes
April 2, 1992	Mexico City	Mexico	Palacio de los Deportes
April 6, 1992	Oklahoma City	United States	Myriad Arena
April 9, 1992	Rosemont	United States	Rosemont Horizon
~~April 10, 1992~~	Rosemont	United States	Rosemont Horizon
~~April 13, 1992~~	Auburn Hills	United States	The Palace of Auburn Hills
~~April 14, 1992~~	Auburn Hills	United States	The Palace of Auburn Hills
April 20, 1992	London	England	Wembley Stadium (The Freddie Mercury Tribute Concert)
May 16, 1992	Slane	Ireland	Slane Concert
May 20, 1992	Prague	Czechoslovakia	Strahov Stadium
May 22, 1992	Budapest	Hungary	Népstadion
May 23, 1992	Vienna	Austria	Donauinsel Stadium
May 26, 1992	Berlin	Germany	Olympiastadion
May 28, 1992	Stuttgart	Germany	Cannstatter Wasen
May 30, 1992	Cologne	Germany	Müngersdorfer Stadion
June 3, 1992	Hanover	Germany	Niedersachsenstadion
~~June 5, 1992~~	Werchter	Belgium	Werchter Festival Ground
June 6, 1992	Paris	France	Hippodrome de Vincennes
June 13, 1992	London	England	Wembley Stadium
June 14, 1992	Manchester	England	Maine Road
June 16, 1992	Gateshead	England	Gateshead International Stadium
June 20, 1992	Würzburg	Germany	Airdrome Würzburg-Schenkenturm
June 21, 1992	Basel	Switzerland	St. Jakob Stadium
June 23, 1992	Rotterdam	Netherlands	Feijenoord Stadion
~~June 24, 1992~~	Ghent	Belgium	Expo Hall
June 27, 1992	Turin	Italy	Stadio delle Alpi
~~June 28, 1992~~	Rome	Italy	TBA
June 30, 1992	Seville	Spain	Estadio Benito Villamarín
July 2, 1992	Lisbon	Portugal	Estádio José Alvalade
~~July 4, 1992~~	Madrid	Spain	Vicente Calderón Stadium
~~July 5, 1992~~	Barcelona	Spain	Olympic Stadium
November 25, 1992	Caracas	Venezuela	Poliedro de Caracas
November 29, 1992	Bogotá	Colombia	Estadio El Campín
December 2, 1992	Santiago	Chile	Estadio Nacional de Chile
December 5, 1992	Buenos Aires	Argentina	River Plate Stadium
December 6, 1992	Buenos Aires	Argentina	River Plate Stadium
December 10, 1992	São Paulo	Brazil	Arena Anhembi
December 12, 1992	São Paulo	Brazil	Arena Anhembi
December 13, 1992	Rio de Janeiro	Brazil	Autódromo Internacional Nelson Piquet

List of 1993 concerts
Date	City	Country	Venue
January 12, 1993	Tokyo	Japan	Tokyo Dome
January 14, 1993	Tokyo	Japan	Tokyo Dome
January 15, 1993	Tokyo	Japan	Tokyo Dome
January 30, 1993	Sydney	Australia	Eastern Creek Raceway
February 1, 1993	Melbourne	Australia	Calder Park Raceway
February 6, 1993	Auckland	New Zealand	Mount Smart Stadium
February 23, 1993	Austin	United States	Frank Erwin Center
February 25, 1993	Birmingham	United States	Jefferson Civic Arena
March 6, 1993	New Haven	United States	New Haven Coliseum
March 8, 1993	Portland	United States	Cumberland County Civic Center
March 9, 1993	Hartford	United States	Hartford Civic Center
March 12, 1993	Hamilton	Canada	Copps Coliseum
March 16, 1993	Augusta	United States	Augusta Civic Center
March 17, 1993	Boston	United States	Boston Garden
March 20, 1993	Iowa City	United States	Carver–Hawkeye Arena
March 21, 1993	Fargo	United States	Fargodome
March 24, 1993	Winnipeg	Canada	Winnipeg Arena
March 26, 1993	Saskatoon	Canada	Saskatchewan Place
March 28, 1993	Edmonton	Canada	Northlands Coliseum
March 30, 1993	Vancouver	Canada	BC Place
April 1, 1993	Portland	United States	Memorial Coliseum
April 3, 1993	Sacramento	United States	ARCO Arena
April 4, 1993	Reno	United States	Lawlor Events Center
April 7, 1993	Salt Lake City	United States	Delta Center
April 9, 1993	Rapid City	United States	Don Barnett Arena
April 10, 1993	Omaha	United States	Omaha Civic Auditorium
April 13, 1993	Auburn Hills	United States	The Palace of Auburn Hills
~~April 14, 1993~~	Atlanta	United States	The Omni
April 15, 1993	Roanoke	United States	Roanoke Civic Center
April 16, 1993	Chapel Hill	United States	Dean Smith Center
April 18, 1993	Virginia Beach	United States	Virginia Beach Amphitheatre
April 21, 1993	Guadalajara	Mexico	Estadio Jalisco
April 23, 1993	Mexico City	Mexico	Palacio de los Deportes
April 24, 1993	Mexico City	Mexico	Palacio de los Deportes
April 27, 1993	Monterrey	Mexico	Estadio Universitario
April 28, 1993	Monterrey	Mexico	Estadio Universitario
~~May 1, 1993~~	~~Cincinnati~~	United States	~~Riverfront Coliseum~~
~~May 3, 1993~~	~~Providence~~	United States	~~Providence Civic Center~~
~~May 4, 1993~~	~~Albany~~	United States	~~Knickerbocker Arena~~
~~May 6, 1993~~	~~Amherst~~	United States	~~Mullins Center~~
May 22, 1993	Tel Aviv	Israel	Hayarkon Park
May 24, 1993	Athens	Greece	Olympic Stadium
May 26, 1993	Istanbul	Turkey	Inonu Stadium
May 29, 1993	Milton Keynes	England	National Bowl
May 30, 1993	Milton Keynes	England	National Bowl
June 2, 1993	Vienna	Austria	Praterstadion
June 5, 1993	Nijmegen	Netherlands	Goffertpark
June 6, 1993	Nijmegen	Netherlands	Goffertpark
June 8, 1993	Copenhagen	Denmark	Gentofte Stadion
June 10, 1993	Oslo	Norway	Valle Hovin
June 12, 1993	Stockholm	Sweden	Stockholm Olympic Stadium
June 16, 1993	Basel	Switzerland	St. Jakob Stadium
June 18, 1993	Bremen	Germany	Weserstadion
June 19, 1993	Cologne	Germany	Müngersdorfer Stadion
June 22, 1993	Karlsruhe	Germany	Wildparkstadion
June 25, 1993	Frankfurt	Germany	Waldstadion
June 26, 1993	Munich	Germany	Olympiastadion
June 29, 1993	Modena	Italy	Stadio Comunale
June 30, 1993	Modena	Italy	Stadio Comunale
~~July 2, 1993~~	Cava de' Tirreni	Italy	Stadio Simonetta Lamberti
July 5, 1993	Barcelona	Spain	Estadi Olímpic Lluís Companys
July 6, 1993	Madrid	Spain	Vicente Calderón Stadium
July 8, 1993	Nancy	France	Zénith de Nancy
July 9, 1993	Lyon	France	Halle Tony Garnier
July 11, 1993	Werchter	Belgium	Rock Werchter
July 13, 1993	Paris	France	Palais Omnisports de Paris-Bercy
July 16, 1993	Buenos Aires	Argentina	River Plate Stadium
July 17, 1993	Buenos Aires	Argentina	River Plate Stadium

== Personnel ==
Guns N' Roses

- W. Axl Rose – lead vocals, piano, whistle, whistling, acoustic guitar, tambourine, backing vocals
- Slash – lead guitar, acoustic guitar, backing vocals, talkbox, slide guitar
- Izzy Stradlin – rhythm guitar, backing vocals, acoustic guitar, lead vocals (1991; 1993 – five shows)
- Duff McKagan – bass, backing vocals, lead vocals, drum
- Matt Sorum – drums, percussion, backing vocals, drum
- Dizzy Reed – keyboards, piano, backing vocals, percussion, organ, tambourine
- Gilby Clarke – rhythm guitar, backing vocals, drum (1991–1993)

Touring musicians

- Teddy Andreadis – keyboards, backing vocals, harmonica, tambourine (1991–1993)
- Roberta Freeman – backing vocals, tambourine (1991–1993)
- Traci Amos – backing vocals, tambourine (1991–1993)
- Diane Jones – backing vocals, tambourine (1991–1993)
- Cece Worrall-Rubin – saxophone (1991–1993)
- Anne King – trumpet (1991–1993)
- Lisa Maxwell – horns (1991–1993)

Additional musicians

- Shannon Hoon
- Sebastian Bach
- Lenny Kravitz (June 6, 1992)
- Steven Tyler (June 6, 1992)
- Joe Perry (June 6, 1992)
- Brian May (June 13, 1992)
- Ronnie Wood (January 15, 1993)
- Michael Monroe (May 30, 1993)
- Tyranny of Time
- Soundgarden
- Dumpster
- Raging Slab
- Faith No More
- Skid Row
- Smashing Pumpkins
- My Little Funhouse
- Blind Melon
- El Conde del Guacharo
- Estadio El Campín
- Nine Inch Nails
- Brian May (some shows with his band)
- Body Count
- Motörhead
- Pearls & Swine
- Rose Tattoo
- The Cult
- Soul Asylum
- Meduza
- Suicidal Tendencies
- Red Fun
- Quireboys
