= Use Your Illusion II =

Studio album by Guns N' Roses
- Released: September 17, 1991
- Recorded: January 13, 1990 – August 3, 1991
- Studios: A&M (Hollywood); Record Plant (Los Angeles); Studio 56 (Los Angeles); Image Recording (Hollywood); Conway (Los Angeles); Metalworks (Mississauga, Ontario)
- Genres: Hard rock; heavy metal; blues rock; art rock
- Length: 75:55
- Label: Geffen
- Producers: Mike Clink; Guns N' Roses

Guns N' Roses chronology
G N' R Lies (1988)	Use Your Illusion I and Use Your Illusion II (1991)	"The Spaghetti Incident?" (1993)

Singles from Use Your Illusion II
- 1. "You Could Be Mine" Released: June 25, 1991; 2. "Knockin'on Heaven's Door" Released: May 11, 1992; 3. "Yesterdays" Released: November 2, 1992; 4. "Civil War" Released: May 3, 1993; 5. "Estranged" Released: January 10, 1994

Use Your Illusion II is the fourth studio album by American hard rock band Guns N' Roses, released by Geffen Records on September 17, 1991, the same day as its counterpart Use Your Illusion I. The supporting tour for the albums, the Use Your Illusion Tour, began in May 1991, four months before the release of the albums due to delays in getting the albums out. Bolstered by the lead single "You Could Be Mine", Use Your Illusion II was the slightly more popular of the two albums, selling a record 770,000 copies its first week and debuting at No. 1 on the Billboard 200, ahead of Use Your Illusion I's first-week sales of 685,000. As of 2010, Use Your Illusion II has sold 5,587,000 units in the United States, according to Nielsen SoundScan. Both albums have since been certified 7× Platinum by the Recording Industry Association of America (RIAA). It was No. 1 on the UK Albums Chart for a single week.

It is the last Guns N' Roses studio album to credit rhythm guitarist Izzy Stradlin, and the last with drummer Steven Adler who plays on "Civil War". Along with Use Your Illusion I, it was the last Guns N' Roses album to include new original material until 2008's album Chinese Democracy.

== Overview ==
An "epic hard/art-rock double whammy," the Use Your Illusion albums were a stylistic turning point for Guns N' Roses (see Use Your Illusion I). In addition, Use Your Illusion II is more political than most of their previous work, with songs like "Civil War", a cover of Bob Dylan's "Knockin' on Heaven's Door", and "Get in the Ring" dealing respectively with the topics of violence, law enforcement and media bias. The lyrics deal less with drug use than previous Guns N' Roses albums. Use Your Illusion I featured several songs pre-Appetite for Destruction while Use Your Illusion II featured more tracks written during and after Appetite for Destruction.

The band's cover of "Knockin' on Heaven's Door" had been released almost a year earlier on the Days of Thunder soundtrack, while "Civil War" debuted at the 1990 Farm Aid concert. That concert included Guns N' Roses playing a cover of the U.K. Subs song "Down on the Farm", a studio version of which would later appear on the band's 1993 release of cover songs, "The Spaghetti Incident?". "Civil War" was released as a B-side to "You Could Be Mine". The song had been released on the charity album Nobody's Child: Romanian Angel Appeal, a fund-raising compilation for Romanian orphans.

"You Could Be Mine" was released in June 1991 and is used in the film Terminator 2: Judgment Day, though not released on the soundtrack album. The video uses Arnold Schwarzenegger, in character as the Terminator, with a loose plot featuring Axl Rose as its "target". However, he is saved from termination as he is deemed a "waste of ammo" by the T-800's lock-on system. The original subject matter of the song dealt with Izzy Stradlin's failed relationship with ex-girlfriend Angela Nicoletti.

The Use Your Illusion albums can be considered a single cohesive work, and certain elements of Use Your Illusion II underscore this intent. For instance, both albums have a version of the song "Don't Cry", and both have one cover song; "Live and Let Die" by Paul McCartney (Use Your Illusion I) and "Knockin' on Heaven's Door" by Bob Dylan (Use Your Illusion II). Each has at least one track sung by other members of the band: lead vocals are performed by bassist Duff McKagan on "So Fine", a song that was dedicated to punk rock musician Johnny Thunders, who died from a drug overdose before the recording of the album.

The song "Get in the Ring" finds the band lashing out at a career's worth of critics and enemies. Among those referred to by name are editors of several entertainment magazines. The industrial-flavored "My World", the final track, was written and recorded in three hours, with Rose claiming those in the recording room were on mushrooms at the time.

The band had some difficulty achieving the final sound, especially during the mixing stages of both albums. According to a 1991 cover story by Rolling Stone magazine, after mixing 21 tracks with engineer/producer Bob Clearmountain, the band fired Clearmountain when he tried to replace the real drums with samples. According to Slash's autobiography, "one afternoon we discovered a notepad of his where he'd notated all the drum samples he planned to mix in over Matt's drum tracks" the band decided to scrap the mixes and start from scratch with engineer Bill Price of Sex Pistols fame.

Slash has stated that most of the material for the album was written on acoustic guitars in a couple of nights at his house (the Walnut House), after several months of non-productivity. According to Slash "Breakdown" was one of the most complicated songs to record on the album; the banjo, drum, and piano parts were hard to synchronize and drummer Matt Sorum "lost it" a couple of times trying to get the drums just right. The song "Locomotive" was written in a house Slash and Izzy Stradlin rented in the Hollywood Hills following the Appetite for Destruction tours. The song shows the group dabbling in funk metal, and is the only song on either album where the phrase "use your illusion" appears as a lyric.

== Artwork ==
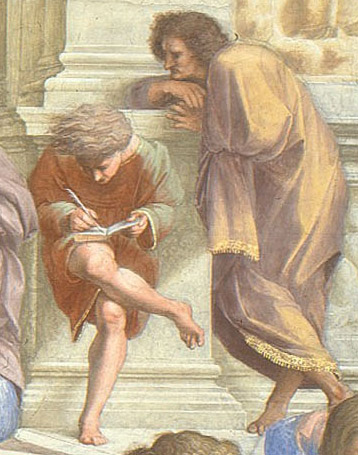
Raphael, The School of Athens (detail)

Both albums' covers are the work of Estonian-American artist Mark Kostabi. They consist of detail from Raphael's painting The School of Athens. The highlighted figure, unlike many of those in the painting, has not been identified with any specific philosopher. The only difference in the artwork between the albums is the color scheme used for each album. Use Your Illusion II uses blue and purple. The original painting was titled by Paul Kostabi as Use Your Illusion and became the title of both albums. Both Use Your Illusion albums' liner notes include the message "Fuck You, St. Louis!" amongst the thank you notes, a reference to the Riverport Riot near there at the Hollywood Casino Amphitheatre in July 1991 during the Use Your Illusion Tour.

== Reception ==
Professional ratings
Review scores
Source	Rating
AllMusic	3/5 stars
Chicago Tribune	4/4 stars
Entertainment Weekly	A
Los Angeles Times	4/4 stars
NME	4/10
Pitchfork	8.8/10
Q	5/5 stars
Rolling Stone	4/5 stars
The Rolling Stone Album Guide	4/5 stars
USA Today	3.5/4 stars

Use Your Illusion II received positive reviews, though some critics rated it lower than Use Your Illusion I. Rolling Stone critic Christian Wright wrote that the album's songs "range from ballad to battle, pretty to vulgar, worldly to incredibly naive", concluding that Rose "whips victimization, menace and struggle into one fluid, triumphant motion." Greg Kot of the Chicago Tribune commented that both Use Your Illusion albums "represent a staggering leap in ambition, musicianship, production and songwriting" and "rank with the best hard rock of the last decade", while finding that II contains more "knockout punches" than I. Although deeming I the better record, USA Today's Edna Gundersen called II similarly "rebellious, ambitious and powerful". In NME, Mary Anne Hobbs panned both albums for their "dreadfully laboured feel" and "asinine" lyrics; as examples of the latter, she cited the "gratuitous sexism" of "Pretty Tied Up" and "slack political rhetoric" of "Civil War". Robert Christgau was unimpressed by II apart from "Civil War", which he designated as a "choice cut" in The Village Voice.

In a retrospective review for AllMusic, Stephen Thomas Erlewine described Use Your Illusion II as "more serious and ambitious than I, but ... also considerably more pretentious", finding it a tedious listen due to its "pompous production and poor pacing" despite commending the "nervy energy" of certain songs. Ann Powers was more complimentary in the 2004 Rolling Stone Album Guide, calling it "spacier" than I while noting that "Yesterdays" and "You Could Be Mine" show that Guns N' Roses "can still focus to great effect". Both Use Your Illusion records were jointly ranked 41st on Rolling Stone's 2010 list of the best albums of the 1990s.

It was the first time that two albums by one band or artist had entered the US charts at the number one and two spots and Guns N' Roses became the first to have the top two biggest selling albums on the chart since Jim Croce in 1974. The albums opened as the top two albums on the charts in Australia, Japan, New Zealand and the United Kingdom.

== Track listing ==
No.	Title	Writer(s)	Length
1.	"Civil War"	Axl Rose; Slash; Duff McKagan	7:42
2.	"14 Years"	Rose; Izzy Stradlin	4:21
3.	"Yesterdays"	Rose; West Arkeen; Del James; Billy McCloud	3:14
4.	"Knockin' on Heaven's Door" (Bob Dylan cover)	Dylan	5:36
5.	"Get in the Ring"	Rose; Slash; McKagan	5:42
6.	"Shotgun Blues"	Rose	3:26
7.	"Breakdown"	Rose	7:04
8.	"Pretty Tied Up" ("The Perils of Rock n' Roll Decadence")	Stradlin	4:48
9.	"Locomotive (Complicity)"	Rose; Slash	8:42
10.	"So Fine"	McKagan	4:08
11.	"Estranged"	Rose	9:23
12.	"You Could Be Mine"	Rose; Stradlin	5:43
13.	"Don't Cry" (alternate lyrics)	Rose; Stradlin	4:45
14.	"My World"	Rose	1:24
Total length:			75:55

2022 deluxe edition bonus CD
No.	Title	Writer(s)	Length
1.	"Pretty Tied Up" (live in New York)	Stradlin	5:14
2.	"14 Years" (live in London)	Rose; Stradlin	4:40
3.	"Voodoo Child (Slight Return) / Civil War / Voodoo Child (Slight Return)" (The Jimi Hendrix Experience cover; live in Las Vegas)	Jimi Hendrix ("Voodoo Child (Slight Return"): Rose; Slash; McKagan; ("Civil War")	8:15
4.	"You Could Be Mine" (live in New York)	Rose; Stradlin	5:33
5.	"Drum Solo" (live in Paris)	Matt Sorum	7:21
6.	"Guitar Solo" (live in Paris)	Slash	4:10
7.	"Speak Softly, Love (Love Theme From The Godfather)" (Nino Rota cover; live in Paris)	Rota	2:28
8.	"Sail Away Sweet Sister" (Queen cover; live in Paris)	Brian May	1:09
9.	"So Fine" (live in Las Vegas)	McKagan	4:12
10.	"Only Women Bleed / Knockin' on Heaven's Door" (Alice Cooper and Bob Dylan cover; live in Rio De Janeiro)	Cooper; Dick Wagner; ("Only Women Bleed"); Dylan ("Knockin' on Heaven's Door")	8:50
11.	"Mama Kin" (Aerosmith cover, featuring Steven Tyler and Joe Perry; live in Paris)	Tyler	3:57
12.	"Train Kept A-Rollin'" (feat. Steven Tyler and Joe Perry; live in Paris)	Tiny Bradshaw; Lois Mann; Howard Kay	4:09
13.	"Estranged" (live in Las Vegas)	Rose	9:10
Total length:			67:08

2022 bonus CD tracks for Japan
No.	Title	Writer(s)	Length
14.	"Pretty Tied Up" (live in Tokyo)	Stradlin	5:14
15.	"You Could Be Mine" (live in Tokyo)	Rose; Stradlin	6:10
Total length:			78:32

== Personnel ==
- W. Axl Rose – lead vocals, piano, whistling, backing vocals, synthesizer, drum machine, keyboards, effects, art direction, design
- Slash – lead guitar, rhythm guitar, acoustic guitar, banjo on "Civil War" and "Breakdown", art direction, design
- Izzy Stradlin – rhythm guitar, backing vocals, lead vocals on "14 Years", acoustic guitar, coral sitar on "Pretty Tied Up", lead guitar
- Duff McKagan – bass, backing vocals, lead vocals on "So Fine", co-lead vocals on "Get in the Ring", percussion
- Matt Sorum – drums, percussion, backing vocals
- Dizzy Reed – keyboards, backing vocals

Additional musicians

- Steven Adler – drums on "Civil War"
- Johann Langlie – drums, keyboards and sound effects on "My World"
- Isabella and Carmela Lento – backing vocals on "Knockin' on Heaven's Door"
- Howard Teman – piano on "So Fine"
- Shannon Hoon – co-lead vocals on "Don't Cry"

Production

- Mike Clink – production, engineering
- Jim Mitchell – additional engineering
- Bill Price – mixing
- George Marino – mastering
- Kevin Reagan – art direction, graphic design
- Mark Kostabi – artwork
- Robert John – photography
- Allen Abrahamson – assistant engineer
- Buzz Burrowes – assistant engineer
- Chris Puram – assistant engineer
- Craig Portelis – assistant engineer
- Ed Goodreau – assistant engineer
- Jason Roberts – assistant engineer
- John Aguto – assistant engineer
- L. Stu Young – assistant engineer
- Leon Granados – assistant engineer
- Mike Douglass – assistant engineer
- Talley Sherwood – assistant engineer

== Charts ==
=== Weekly charts ===
Weekly chart performance for Use Your Illusion II
Chart (1991–2022)	Peak position
Argentine Albums (CAPIF)	1
Australian Albums (ARIA)	1
Austrian Albums (Ö3 Austria)	1
Belgian Albums (Ultratop Wallonia)	8
Croatian International Albums (HDU)	22
Dutch Albums (Album Top 100)	2
European Albums (European Top 100 Albums)	3
French Albums (SNEP)	11
German Albums (Offizielle Top 100)	2
Greek Albums (IFPI Greece)	5
Hungarian Albums (MAHASZ)	3
Italian Albums (FIMI)	6
Japanese Hot Albums (Billboard Japan)	15
New Zealand Albums (RMNZ)	1
Norwegian Albums (VG-lista)	2
Polish Albums (ZPAV)	30
Portuguese Albums (AFP)	35
Scottish Albums (Official Charts)	18
Spanish Albums (AFYVE)	3
Swedish Albums (Sverigetopplistan)	4
Swiss Albums (Schweizer Hitparade)	2
UK Albums (Official Charts)	1
UK Album Downloads (Official Charts)	23
UK Rock & Metal Albums (Official Charts)	2
US Billboard 200	1
US Indie Store Album Sales (Billboard)	8
US Top Hard Rock Albums (Billboard)	9

=== Year-end charts ===
1991 year-end chart performance for Use Your Illusion II
Chart (1991)	Position
Australian Albums (ARIA)	18
Austrian Albums (Ö3 Austria)	27
Canada Top Albums/CDs (RPM)	14
Dutch Albums (Album Top 100)	101
European Albums (European Top 100 Albums)	33
German Albums (Offizielle Top 100)	51
New Zealand Albums (RMNZ)	16
UK Albums (OCC)	38
US Billboard 200	94

1992 year-end chart performance for Use Your Illusion II
Chart (1992)	Position
Argentina Foreign Albums (CAPIF)	4
Australian Albums (ARIA)	18
Austrian Albums (Ö3 Austria)	3
Canada Top Albums/CDs (RPM)	43
Dutch Albums (Album Top 100) Use Your Illusion I + II	3
European Albums (European Top 100 Albums)	6
German Albums (Offizielle Top 100)	5
New Zealand Albums (RMNZ)	20
Swiss Albums (Schweizer Hitparade)	5
UK Albums (OCC)	38
US Billboard 200	20

1993 year-end chart performance for Use Your Illusion II
Chart (1993)	Position
Dutch Albums (Album Top 100)	39
German Albums (Offizielle Top 100)	31

2002 year-end chart performance for Use Your Illusion II
Chart (2002)	Position
Canadian Metal Albums (Nielsen SoundScan)	97

=== Decade-end charts ===
Decade-end chart performance for Use Your Illusion II
Chart (1990–99)	Position
US Billboard 200	67

== Certifications ==
Certifications and sales for Use Your Illusion II
Region	Certification	Certified units/sales
Argentina (CAPIF)	6× Platinum	360,000^{^}
Australia (ARIA)	5× Platinum	350,000^{^}
Austria (IFPI Austria)	2× Platinum	100,000^{*}
Brazil (Pro-Música Brasil)	Platinum	250,000^{*}
Brazil (Pro-Música Brasil) Deluxe Edition	Diamond	160,000^{‡}
Canada (Music Canada)	9× Platinum	900,000^{^}
Denmark (IFPI Danmark)	2× Platinum	40,000^{‡}
Finland (Musiikkituottajat)	Platinum	76,688
France (SNEP)	Platinum	300,000^{*}
Germany (BVMI)	5× Gold	1,250,000^{^}
Italy (FIMI) sales since 2009	Platinum	50,000^{‡}
Japan (RIAJ)	2× Platinum	400,000^{^}
Mexico (AMPROFON) video	Gold	10,000^{^}
Mexico (AMPROFON)	Platinum	250,000^{^}
Netherlands (NVPI)	Platinum	100,000^{^}
New Zealand (RMNZ)	Platinum	15,000^{^}
Norway (IFPI Norway)	2× Platinum	100,000^{*}
Spain (Promusicae)	Platinum	100,000^{^}
Sweden (GLF)	Platinum	100,000^{^}
Switzerland (IFPI Switzerland)	3× Platinum	150,000^{^}
United Kingdom (BPI)	Platinum	402,781
United States (RIAA)	7× Platinum	7,000,000^{^}
^{*} Sales figures based on certification alone.^{^} Shipments figures based on certification alone.^{‡} Sales+streaming figures based on certification alone.

== See also ==
- List of best-selling albums in Argentina
- List of best-selling albums in Germany
- List of glam metal albums and songs
