= Studio 56 =

Recording studio in Hollywood, California

Coordinates: 34.2137°N 118.5185°W

Studio 56 is a recording studio in California. Studio 56 was founded by Paul Schwartz with Tom Herzer and Jeff Fargus as a home studio at 7856 White Oak in Northridge, California. Schwartz established the studio as a production house, recording demos by artists such as Roy Orbison, Evelyn "Champagne" King, Smokey Robinson, Stephanie Mills, Fleetwood Mac, Burton Cummings, Howard Hewett, Moon Martin, Five Star, Billy Burnette, The Dwight Twilley Band, The Sylvers and The Jackson 5.

== History ==
In 1986, Studio 56 needed to expand and moved to the former Radio Recorders studio at 7000 Santa Monica Blvd in Hollywood, California. By 1988 Studio 56 had 4 Studios and a soundstage in full operation. The producers would track in Studio A, move to Studio B for overdubs and vocals, move to Studio C to track big room guitars and choirs from the sound stage, and go back to Studio A to mix.

In 1989, Studio 56 upgraded to 32-track Mitsubishi Digital Decks and Studer 820 Analog Tape Decks with SR Dolby and built a new control room in the Sound Stage, Studio D with an MCI Console. The following year, the studio further expanded by building Studio E.

Schwartz added 2 more studios and 56 West, a live music club. 56 West became home for Booker T Jones III and his crew Shake City Productions. Performances at 56 West could be recorded by Studio G, and Studio F became home of the Danish producer and songwriter team Soulshock and Karlin.

In 1993, Studio 56 expanded into 7006 and 7008 Santa Monica Blvd and built Studio H.

By 1998, CEO/President, Paul Schwartz of Studio 56 Inc. announced the purchase of the real estate at 7000 Santa Monica Blvd from South Park Real Estate Group.

== Artists ==
Studio 56 has been used by numerous notable artists, including Sugar Ray, Kenneth Crouch, Derrick Edmondson, Johnny Cash, Toni Braxton, Mary J. Blige, Boyz II Men, Chaka Khan, Brandy, Guns N' Roses, R. Kelly, Missy Elliott, Jessica Simpson, Bone Thugs-N-Harmony, Korn, Priscilla Presley, Natalie Cole, Christina Aguilera, Queen Latifah, Keith Clizark, Ringo Starr, Frank Zappa, Harry Nilsson, Burton Cummings, Ray J, Gladys Knight, Rod Stewart, Stevie Wonder and many more great artists. Producers like Keith Crouch, Jack Douglas, Mike Clink, Damon Elliot, Timbaland, Stanley Clarke, Phil Spector, David Cole, Dr. Dre, Gamble and Huff, Randy Jackson, Jae Deal, Booker T Jones II, Booker T Jones III, David Malloy, Tim McGraw, Van Dyke Parks, John Purdell, Tom Werman, Duane Baron, Richard Perry, Elan Morrison and Leon Sylvers III, Shades of Blue band George Music productions
