= Estranged (song) =

1994 single by Guns N' Roses

Single by Guns N' Roses

from the album Use Your Illusion II
- B-side: "The Garden" (LP version)
- Released: January 10, 1994
- Genre: Hard rock
- Length: 9:23
- Label: Geffen
- Songwriter: Axl Rose
- Producers: Mike Clink; Guns N' Roses

Guns N' Roses singles chronology
"Ain't It Fun" (1993)	"Estranged" (1994)	"Since I Don't Have You" (1994)

Music video
- "Estranged" on YouTube

"Estranged" is a song by American hard rock band Guns N' Roses, included on their 1991 album Use Your Illusion II. Described as a ballad, the song was released as a single in January 1994.

== Background ==
At over nine minutes long, "Estranged", also known for its music video, is the longest song on Use Your Illusion II and Guns N' Roses' second longest song overall (after "Coma" from Use Your Illusion I). It has many verses, no set chorus, and several distinguished guitar and piano solos. Use Your Illusion II's liner notes thank lead guitarist Slash for "the killer guitar melodies", which captured Axl Rose's vision. Slash has specifically stated that recording the guitar parts for this song was very intensive for him; he recorded it using a Les Paul Gold Top, using the rhythm pickup with the tone turned all the way down.

According to Slash, the song was written while the band was rehearsing for an extended period of time in Chicago. Axl revealed that he wrote the song during a more "bummed out" time in his life when his marriage with Erin Everly was annulled.

== Meaning ==
Of the song, Axl in the early '90s said, “November Rain is a song about not wanting to be in a state of having to deal with unrequited love. Estranged is acknowledging it, and being there, and having to figure out what the fuck to do. It’s like being catapulted out into the universe and having no choice about it, and having to figure out 'What the fuck are you gonna do?' Because the things you wanted and worked for just cannot happen, and there’s nothing you can fucking do about it.”

== Music video ==
First aired in December 1993, the official music video (directed by Andy Morahan) is the third part of an unofficial Del James series of videos (preceded by "Don't Cry" and "November Rain") from the Use Your Illusion I and Use Your Illusion II albums. The estimated budget was $4 million. The video is similar in style to the previous two in the trilogy. Its live scenes were shot at Olympiastadion in Munich, Germany.

=== Description ===
The video is the third and final chapter in the "November Rain music video trilogy" (preceded by "Don't Cry" and "November Rain"). It was directed by Andy Morahan and written by Axl Rose. While "Don't Cry" and "November Rain" have a strong similarity (they both stage a sort of motion picture film told in vignettes and following the story of a romantic relationship), "Estranged" has very little connection to the story of the two previous videos. This is mainly because Rose's then-girlfriend Stephanie Seymour (who played his girlfriend in "Don't Cry" and "November Rain") had broken up with him before shooting the video, forcing him and the director to abandon the original plans for the shooting of "Estranged".

The video shows Axl Rose being arrested by a group of special police officers, then taken to a mental health clinic, as definitions of various emotional disorders are seen on the screen. The protagonist (Rose) talks to the therapists about his emotional problems, a topic that was depicted in the video for "Don't Cry." In the end, the protagonist is released from the clinic and heads to an abandoned ship at sea, where the story reaches its climax: Rose jumps into the water and swims with a pod of dolphins, gaining inner peace by doing so.

== Reception ==
"Estranged" is widely considered to be one of the band's best songs. In 2017, Paste ranked the song number two on their list of the 15 greatest Guns N' Roses songs, and in 2020, Kerrang ranked the song number four on their list of the 20 greatest Guns N' Roses songs.

== Live performances ==
"Estranged" was played live very frequently during the Use Your Illusion Tour from 1991 to 1993. During performances of this song, Dizzy Reed would play piano instead of Axl Rose. A live version of this song can be heard on Live Era: '87-'93. During the Chinese Democracy Tour, a riff from the song was sometimes included in Ron Thal's solo interpretation of the Pink Panther Theme. In December 2008, Axl spoke of his desire to bring "Estranged" back into the live set. The song was featured with regularity on the tour from 2011 to 2014. A recording was issued on the Appetite for Democracy 3D video. It was played at almost every show on the Not in This Lifetime... Tour.

Examples of live performances:

- The Ritz in New York City on May 16, 1991
- Indiana on May 29, 1991
- Tokyo on February 22, 1992
- Oklahoma on April 6, 1992
- Rio de Janeiro on September 8, 2022
- London on June 30, 2023 at Hyde Park during the BST Series.

== Track listing ==
Germany and Australia CD
No.	Title	Writer(s)	Length
1.	"Estranged" (LP version)	W. Axl Rose	9:23
2.	"The Garden" (LP version)	Rose, West Arkeen, Del James	5:22

== Personnel ==
- W. Axl Rose – lead vocals, piano
- Slash – lead guitar
- Izzy Stradlin – rhythm guitar, additional lead guitar
- Duff McKagan – bass
- Matt Sorum – drums

== Charts ==
Chart (1994)	Peak position
Australia (ARIA)	40
New Zealand (Recorded Music NZ)	28
Sweden (Sverigetopplistan)	26
Switzerland (Schweizer Hitparade)	41
US Mainstream Rock (Billboard)	16

== Certifications ==
Region	Certification	Certified units/sales
New Zealand (RMNZ)	Gold	15,000^{‡}
^{‡} Sales+streaming figures based on certification alone.

== See also ==
- List of most expensive music videos
