= Chinese Democracy Tour =

2001–2011 concert tour by Guns N' Roses

- World tour by Guns N' Roses
- A poster for the 2002 leg of the tour
- Location: Asia; Europe; North America; Oceania; South America
- Associated album: Chinese Democracy
- Start date: January 1, 2001
- End date: December 31, 2011
- Legs: 19
- No. of shows: 239

Guns N' Roses concert chronology
- Use Your Illusion Tour (1991–1993); Chinese Democracy Tour (2001–2002; 2006–2007; 2009–2011); Up Close and Personal Tour (2012)

The Chinese Democracy Tour was a worldwide concert tour by the American hard rock band Guns N' Roses to promote the group's album Chinese Democracy. It began in 2001, with three U.S. dates and a Brazilian one, while their 2002 tour included Asian, North American and a few European dates. The band did not tour again until May 2006, when it toured North America again and performed a major tour of Europe. The band's tour continued in 2007 with shows in Australia, New Zealand, Japan and Mexico.

Their first show after the 2008 release of Chinese Democracy was in Taiwan on December 11, 2009. In the same month, the group played South Korea for the first time, as well as two dates in Japan. The tour continued with concerts in North America, South/Central America, Europe and Australia. As of late 2010, the entire tour had attracted a total audience of about 4,000,000 people. The ten-year tour came to a close on the final day of 2011, with a New Year's Eve show in Las Vegas, making it their second longest tour ever, just behind Use Your Illusion Tour, as well as their most-played concert tour ever, with 239 total shows.

== Band members' history ==
The bulk of the band remained stable throughout the tour: lead vocalist Axl Rose; keyboardist and backing vocalist Dizzy Reed; bassist and backing vocalist Tommy Stinson; co-lead guitarist Robin Finck; and keyboardist, programmer and backing vocalist Chris Pitman. The main lineup changes were in the form of rhythm guitarists (Paul Tobias from 2001 to 2002, Richard Fortus from 2002 to present), lead guitarists partnering Finck (Buckethead from 2001 to 2004, Ron "Bumblefoot" Thal from 2006 to 2014) and drummers (Brain from 2001 to 2006, Frank Ferrer from 2006 to 2025). The 2006/2007 tour lineup—Rose, Reed, Stinson, Pitman, Finck, Fortus, Thal and Ferrer—remained to complete the album, released in 2008. Finck rejoined Nine Inch Nails in 2008, and was replaced by Sixx:A.M. guitarist DJ Ashba in 2009.

== 2001 European Tour ==
The 2001 European Tour (often referred to as the Chinese Democracy Tour) was a scheduled concert tour by Guns N' Roses, planned in support of the band's then-upcoming sixth studio album Chinese Democracy. Initially due to begin and end in June, many tour dates were rescheduled for December due to the reported illness of guitarist Buckethead. The re-configured tour was later canceled outright.

=== Background ===
Following the Use Your Illusion Tour, which ran for over two years and visited 27 countries, and the release of cover album "The Spaghetti Incident?" in November 1993, the band began to write new material. Relationships between band members began deteriorating, however, and the future of Guns N' Roses was in doubt. As members turned focus to their own side-projects tensions began to grow.

Gilby Clarke was the first to leave the band, reportedly being fired in June 1994. On October 30, 1996, it was announced that lead guitarist Slash had officially left the band, after having not been involved since 1995 due to a poor relationship with vocalist Axl Rose. Drummer Matt Sorum was fired from the band after an argument with guitarist Paul Tobias, and Duff McKagan became the last member to leave in 1997. With only one remaining original member, Axl Rose, and one other member from the "Use Your Illusion" lineup, Dizzy Reed, Guns N' Roses began the search for new musicians, while the former members continued with their respective solo and band careers, with Slash, McKagan and Sorum later forming Velvet Revolver with Stone Temple Pilots vocalist Scott Weiland in 2003.

Robin Finck from Nine Inch Nails became the band's lead guitarist in 1997, followed shortly the next year by drummer Josh Freese and bassist Tommy Stinson. Finck left the band in 1999 to rejoin his former band Nine Inch Nails, before the band recorded and released their first new song in eight years in the form of "Oh My God". A number of changes to the band occurred in 2000, including the departure of Freese, the hiring of lead guitarist Buckethead and drummer Brain, and the return of Robin Finck. Along with these changes came the news that Guns N' Roses were planning a tour in the summer of 2001, and would be playing at the Rock in Rio festival in January.

=== Warm-up shows ===
The first warm-up show for the upcoming tour of Europe was announced in December 2000 as a New Year's Day performance at the House of Blues in Las Vegas. It was also rumored that the long-awaited Chinese Democracy would be released in June 2001, for which the scheduled European Tour would be promotional. Guns N' Roses – then composed of vocalist Axl Rose, lead guitarists Buckethead and Robin Finck, rhythm guitarist Paul Tobias (who joined in 1994 to replace Gilby Clarke), bassist Tommy Stinson, drummer Brain and keyboardists Dizzy Reed (still with the band since joining in 1990) and Chris Pitman (who joined between 1998 and 2000) – completed the band's first performance in seven years, which was praised as "a triumphant return" by music magazine Rolling Stone. The band performed a number of new songs, including "Oh My God" (released as a single in 1999), "Riad N' The Bedouins", "Chinese Democracy", "Street of Dreams" (all later released on Chinese Democracy) and "Silkworms" (which was reworked and released as a single in August 2021), including a bulk of original songs and 'classics' such as "Welcome to the Jungle", "Paradise City", "November Rain" and "You Could Be Mine". The Las Vegas show was followed two weeks later by the performance at Rock in Rio in Rio de Janeiro, Brazil. The performance featured a similar set list, which also included the live debut of new song "Madagascar". MTV praised the performance as "The capstone of the third night of the [...] festival", summarising it as "an exciting show."

=== Cancellations ===
Guns N' Roses were due to begin their European Tour on June 1 at the German music festival Rock am Ring, but announced in May that they were to cancel the entire tour; according to the band's European management agency, the reason for the cancellation was the illness of lead guitarist Buckethead. With a rescheduling process said to be planned, it was later announced that many of the proposed tour dates would be completed later in the year. On November 8, it was announced that the tour was to be canceled completely, allegedly due to the ongoing illness of Buckethead, which was also said to have delayed the completion of the upcoming album. The band's manager, Doug Goldstein, apologized to fans for scheduling the tour, which he admitted was a poorly executed decision, with the following statement:

Following the euphoria of [the band's appearance at the] Rock in Rio [concert], I jumped the gun and arranged a European tour as our plan was to have the new album out this year. Unfortunately, Buckethead's illness not only stopped the tour, but it slowed down our progress on Chinese Democracy. I am very sorry to disappoint our fans, but I can assure them that this is not what Axl wanted, nor is it 'Another page from the Howard Hughes of rock,' as some media will no doubt portray it. I made a plan, and unfortunately it did not work out.

Despite not being able to complete their tour of Europe, the full lineup of Guns N' Roses performed two more shows in 2001, both at The Joint, Hard Rock Hotel and Casino in Las Vegas, on December 29 and 31. Songs performed made up similar set lists to those at the January performances.

=== Set list ===
January 1, 2001 – House of Blues, Las Vegas, Nevada

Main set:

1. "Welcome to the Jungle"
2. "It's So Easy"
3. "Mr. Brownstone"
4. "Live and Let Die"
5. "Oh My God"
6. "My Michelle"
7. "Think About You"
8. "You Could Be Mine"
9. "Sweet Child o' Mine"
10. "Knockin' on Heaven's Door"
11. "November Rain"
12. "Out ta Get Me"
13. "Riad N' The Bedouins"
14. "Chinese Democracy"
15. "Rocket Queen"
16. "Patience"
17. "Street of Dreams (The Blues)"
18. "Nightrain"

Encores:

19. "Silkworms"
20. "Paradise City"

January 14, 2001 – Rock in Rio, Rio de Janeiro, Brazil

Main set:

1. "Welcome to the Jungle"
2. "It's So Easy"
3. "Mr. Brownstone"
4. "Live and Let Die"
5. "Oh My God"
6. "Think About You"
7. "You Could Be Mine"
8. "Sweet Child o' Mine"
9. "Knockin' on Heaven's Door"
10. "Madagascar"
11. "November Rain"
12. "Out ta Get Me"
13. "Rocket Queen"
14. "Chinese Democracy"
15. "Street of Dreams (The Blues)"
16. "Patience"
17. "Nightrain"

Encores:

18. "My Michelle"
19. "Silkworms"
20. "Paradise City"

=== Personnel ===
- Axl Rose – lead vocals, piano, occasional rhythm guitar
- Robin Finck – guitars, backing vocals
- Buckethead – guitars, nunchaku
- Paul Tobias – guitars, slide guitar, backing vocals
- Tommy Stinson – bass, backing vocals
- Brain – drums, percussion
- Dizzy Reed – keyboards, backing vocals, percussion
- Chris Pitman – keyboards, synthesizers, sub-bass, sampling, programming, tambourine, backing vocals

=== Tour dates ===
Date	City	Country	Venue	Attendance	Notes
Warm-up shows
January 1, 2001	Paradise	United States	House of Blues	1,800	*
January 14, 2001	Rio de Janeiro	Brazil	Rock in Rio 3	200,000	**
Original Tour
~~June 1, 2001~~	Nürburg	Germany	Rock am Ring		Cancelled
~~June 3, 2001~~	Nuremberg	Germany	Rock im Park		Cancelled
~~June 5, 2001~~	Berlin	Germany	Waldbühne		Cancelled
~~June 9, 2001~~	London	England	London Arena		Rescheduled
~~June 10, 2001~~	London	England	London Arena		Rescheduled
~~June 12, 2001~~	Glasgow	Scotland	SECC		Rescheduled
~~June 13, 2001~~	Manchester	England	Manchester Arena		Rescheduled
~~June 14, 2001~~	Birmingham	England	NEC Arena		Rescheduled
~~June 17, 2001~~	Imola	Italy	Heineken Festival		Cancelled
~~June 19, 2001~~	Madrid	Spain	Plaza de Las Ventas		Cancelled
~~June 20, 2001~~	Barcelona	Spain	Palau Sant Jordi		Cancelled
~~June 22, 2001~~	Wohlen	Switzerland	Wohlen Festival		Cancelled
~~June 23, 2001~~	Arnhem	Netherlands	GelreDome		Rescheduled
~~June 25, 2001~~	Stockholm	Sweden	Globen		Rescheduled
~~June 26, 2001~~	Oslo	Norway	Spektrum		Rescheduled
~~June 28, 2001~~	Roskilde	Denmark	Roskilde Festival		Cancelled
~~June 30, 2001~~	Werchter	Belgium	Rock Werchter		Cancelled
Rescheduled Tour
~~December 2, 2001~~	Arnhem	Netherlands	GelreDome		Cancelled
~~December 5, 2001~~	Oslo	Norway	Spektrum		Cancelled
~~December 7, 2001~~	Stockholm	Sweden	Globen		Cancelled
~~December 9, 2001~~	Helsinki	Finland	Hartwall Areena		Cancelled
~~December 13, 2001~~	London	England	London Arena		Cancelled
~~December 14, 2001~~	London	England	London Arena		Cancelled
~~December 16, 2001~~	Glasgow	Scotland	SECC		Cancelled
~~December 18, 2001~~	Manchester	England	MEN Arena		Cancelled
~~December 19, 2001~~	Birmingham	England	NEC		Cancelled
New Year Shows
December 29, 2001	Paradise	United States	The Joint	1,400	
December 31, 2001	Paradise	United States	The Joint	1,400	

#		Source
*	First show since 1993, ending of the Use Your Illusion Tour. First show for the new line-up. Axl on vocals, Dizzy Reed on keyboards, Tommy Stinson on bass, Chris Pitman on keyboards, Paul Tobias, Buckethead and Robin Finck on guitar, and Brain on drums. GN'R performed five new songs (that includes Oh My God).	
**	Guns N' Roses' biggest concert attendance ever.	

== 2002/2003 World Tour ==
Chinese Democracy Tour 2002 was the band's first major tour since 1993. The North American leg was organized in the autumn of 2002 to support the supposed release of Chinese Democracy, and was announced on September 25, 2002, as the Chinese Democracy Tour. Thirty-five dates had originally been scheduled, but the band ended up performing at only sixteen.

=== Set list ===
Madagascar, Chinese Democracy and Street of Dreams were played frequently while Riad N' The Bedouins was dropped a few dates later. Welcome to the Jungle opened the show and Paradise City ended the encore on all dates.

August 18, 2002 – WTC Open Air Stadium, Osaka, Japan

Main set:

1. "Welcome to the Jungle"
2. "It's So Easy"
3. "Mr. Brownstone"
4. "Live and Let Die"
5. "Think About You"
6. "You Could Be Mine"
7. "Sweet Child o' Mine"
8. "Knockin' on Heaven's Door"
9. "Out ta Get Me"
10. "Riad N' The Bedouins"
11. "Madagascar"
12. "November Rain"
13. "Rocket Queen"
14. "Nightrain"
15. "Street of Dreams (The Blues)"
16. "Chinese Democracy"
17. "Patience"

Encore:

18. "Paradise City"

December 5, 2002 – Madison Square Garden, New York City

Main set:

1. "Welcome to the Jungle"
2. "It's So Easy"
3. "Mr. Brownstone"
4. "Live and Let Die"
5. "Knockin' on Heaven's Door"
6. "Think About You"
7. "You Could Be Mine"
8. "Sweet Child o' Mine"
9. "Out ta Get Me"
10. "November Rain"
11. "Chinese Democracy"
12. "Madagascar"
13. "Rocket Queen"
14. "Street of Dreams (The Blues)"
15. "My Michelle"
16. "Patience"
17. "Nightrain"

Encore:

18. "Paradise City"

=== Personnel ===
The only lineup change for this tour was the addition of rhythm guitarist Richard Fortus, replacing Paul Tobias due to the fact the latter no longer wished to tour. The touring line up for the 2002 tours of Europe, Asia and North America consisted of:

- Axl Rose – lead vocals, piano
- Robin Finck – guitars, backing vocals
- Buckethead – guitars
- Richard Fortus – rhythm guitar, slide guitar, backing vocals
- Tommy Stinson – bass, backing vocals
- Brain – drums, percussion
- Dizzy Reed – keyboards, piano, percussion, backing vocals
- Chris Pitman – keyboards, synthesizers, sub-bass, sampling, programming, tambourine, backing vocals

=== Tour dates ===
Date	City	Country	Venue	Attendance	Notes
Asia
August 14, 2002	Hong Kong	China	Exhibition Centre	2,000	*
August 17, 2002	Chiba	Japan	Chiba Marine Stadium	35,000	Festival
August 18, 2002	Osaka	Japan	WTC Open Air Stadium	25,000	Festival
Europe
August 23, 2002	Leeds	England	Temple Newsam Park	52,000	Festival
August 24, 2002	Hasselt	Belgium	Pukkelpop Field	100,000	Festival
August 26, 2002	London	England	London Arena	12,000	Sold Out
North America
~~November 7, 2002~~	Vancouver	Canada	GM Place	15,000	Cancelled/Riot **
November 8, 2002	Tacoma	United States	Tacoma Dome	6,100	
November 11, 2002	Nampa	United States	Idaho Center	4,400	
November 14, 2002	Minneapolis	United States	Target Center	8,000	
November 15, 2002	Fargo	United States	Fargodome	6,575	
November 17, 2002	Moline	United States	The MARK of the Quad Cities	7,000	
November 18, 2002	Rosemont	United States	Allstate Arena	18,500	Sold Out
November 21, 2002	Auburn Hills	United States	The Palace of Auburn Hills	8,857	Ended Earlier
November 22, 2002	Pittsburgh	United States	Mellon Arena	9,000	
November 24, 2002	Cleveland	United States	Gund Arena	9,500	
November 25, 2002	Columbus	United States	Nationwide Arena	6,000	
~~November 26, 2002~~	Buffalo	United States	HSBC Arena		
November 27, 2002	Albany	United States	Pepsi Arena	6,000	
November 29, 2002	Toronto	Canada	Air Canada Centre	16,000	Sold Out
November 30, 2002	London	Canada	John Labatt Centre	10,000	Sold Out
December 2, 2002	Boston	United States	Fleet Center	12,700	Sold Out
December 3, 2002	Hartford	United States	Hartford Civic Center	10,000±	
December 5, 2002	New York City	United States	Madison Square Garden	20,000	Sold Out
~~December 6, 2002~~	Philadelphia	United States	First Union Center	15,000	Cancelled/Riot
~~December 8, 2002~~	Philadelphia	United States	First Union Spectrum		Cancelled
~~December 9, 2002~~	Washington, D.C.	United States	MCI Center		Cancelled
~~December 11, 2002~~	Greenville	United States	BI-LO Center		Cancelled
~~December 13, 2002~~	Tampa	United States	Ice Palace		Cancelled
~~December 14, 2002~~	West Palm	United States	Cruzan Amphitheatre		Cancelled
~~December 16, 2002~~	Biloxi	United States	Mississippi Coliseum		Cancelled
~~December 17, 2002~~	Houston	United States	Compaq Center		Cancelled
~~December 19, 2002~~	Dallas	United States	American Airlines Center		Cancelled
~~December 21, 2002~~	Albuquerque	United States	Tingley Coliseum		Cancelled
~~December 22, 2002~~	Phoenix	United States	America West Arena		Cancelled
~~December 27, 2002~~	San Diego	United States	San Diego Sports Arena		Cancelled
~~December 28, 2002~~	Paradise	United States	Mandalay Bay		Cancelled
~~December 30, 2002~~	Sacramento	United States	ARCO Arena		Cancelled
~~December 31, 2002~~	San Jose	United States	Compaq Center		Cancelled
~~January 3, 2003~~	Inglewood	United States	Great Western Forum		Cancelled
~~January 4, 2003~~	Anaheim	United States	Arrowhead Pond		Cancelled

#	
*	First show of the Chinese Democracy World Tour.
**	The show was cancelled, according to a statement from the venue, "when it was recognised that the band could not take the stage at a reasonable time." The next day, in an interview with KISW, Axl Rose said, "Basically, the building manager just decided – in all of our opinion, prematurely – that the show was just cancelled. He didn't discuss it with anyone. [The road crew] found out over the PA."

== 2004 At Rock in Rio Lisbon ==
After the 2002 tour was canceled the band went into hiatus until they were scheduled to play at Rock in Rio Lisboa 1 in May 2004. However lead guitarist Buckethead left the band in March 2004 and their appearance was canceled and Axl Rose made the following statement:

The band has been put in an untenable position by guitarist Buckethead and his untimely departure. On behalf of Guns N' Roses and myself I apologize to the fans who planned to see us at Rock In Rio – Lisbon. The festival and its tradition mean a lot to me personally and I sincerely do not enjoy being robbed by one of our own of the opportunity to be the first artist to play it for the third time. I would also like to express my gratitude to those who chose to embrace Buckethead's role in Guns and support our new line up. We greatly appreciate Bucket's contributions and remain open to 'discussions' as there are obviously several issues to resolve. In the meantime rather than dwelling on the negative, Guns will be moving forward and surprisingly (without giving away any details) this unfortunate set of circumstances may have given us the opportunity to take our recording that one extra step further. Regardless we hope to announce a release date within the next few months.

Date	City	Country	Venue	Notes
~~May 30, 2004~~	Lisbon	Portugal	Rock In Rio	Cancelled

== 2006/2007 World Tour ==
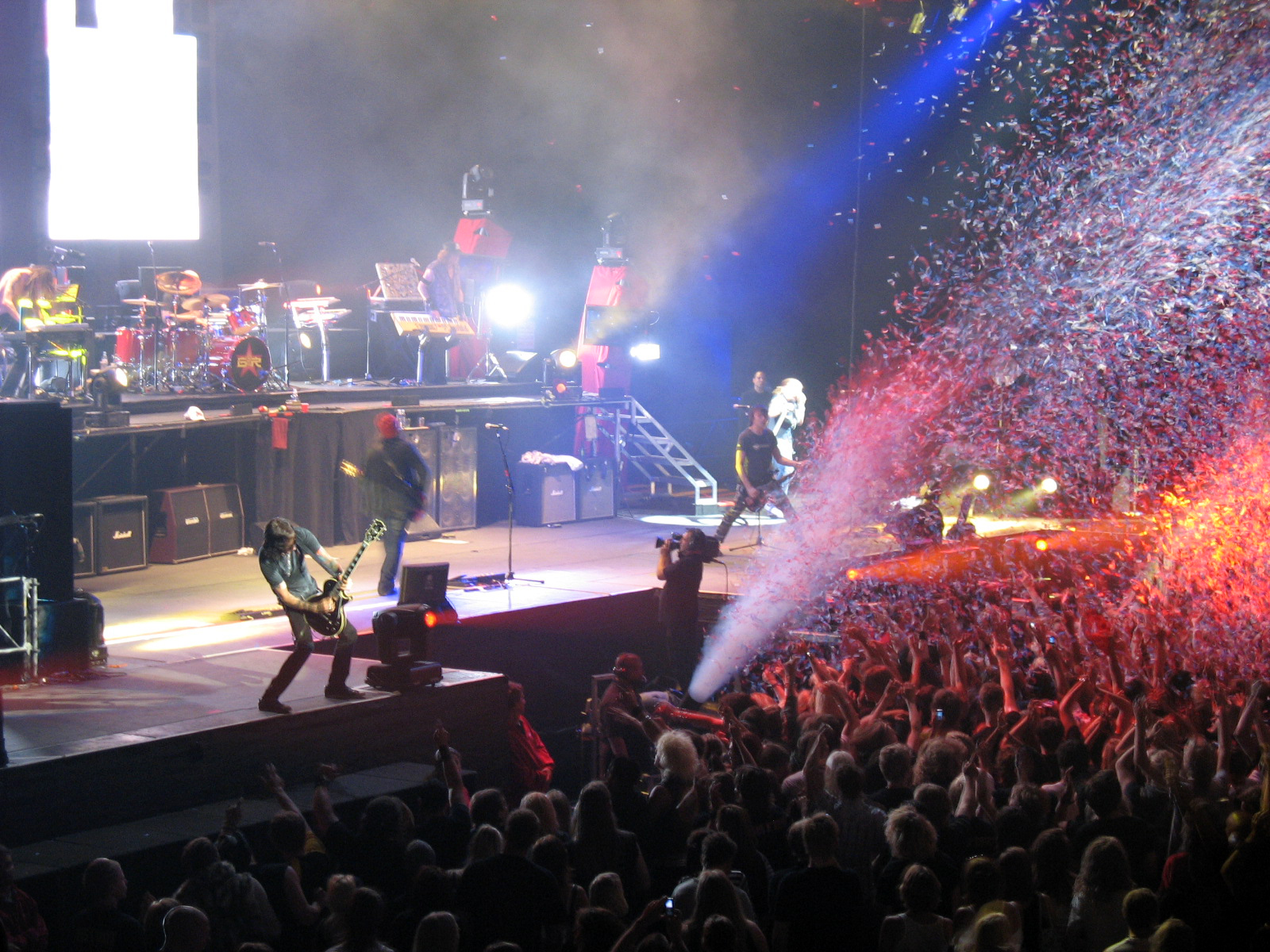
Guns N' Roses performing Paradise City at Globen on June 26, 2006

The Chinese Democracy Tour 2006 was a concert tour by Guns N' Roses promoting their upcoming album Chinese Democracy. It started in May 2006 when the band launched a European tour, headlining both the Download Festival and Rock in Rio Lisboa. Four warm-up shows preceded the tour at Hammerstein Ballroom in New York City, and became the band's first live concert dates since the short 2002 tour. The shows also marked the debut of virtuoso fusion guitarist and composer Ron "Bumblefoot" Thal on lead guitar, replacing Buckethead. During the course of this tour, the band's former rhythm guitarist Izzy Stradlin and Sebastian Bach made frequent guest appearances. The European dates played to over 700,000 people during 32 shows in 18 countries.

=== Set list ===
The band brought You're Crazy, Used to Love Her and Down On The Farm for some dates. Better, I.R.S. and There Was a Time made their live-debut reinforcing rumors about a Chinese Democracy release in 2006.

July 29, 2006 – Wembley Arena, London, England

Main set:

1. "Welcome to the Jungle"
2. "It's So Easy"
3. "Mr. Brownstone"
4. "Live and Let Die"
5. "Sweet Child o' Mine"
6. "Knockin' on Heaven's Door"
7. "Street of Dreams (The Blues)"
8. "Better"
9. "You Could Be Mine"
10. "Out ta Get Me"
11. "Sway"
12. "Sailing"
13. "Back in the U.S.S.R."
14. "Think About You"
15. "My Michelle"
16. "Patience"
17. "November Rain"
18. "Rocket Queen"
19. "Nightrain"

Encores:

20. "I.R.S."
21. "Paradise City"

September 23, 2006 – KROQ Inland Invasion, Hyundai Pavilion, San Bernardino, California

Main set:

1. "Welcome to the Jungle"
2. "It's So Easy"
3. "Mr. Brownstone"
4. "Live and Let Die"
5. "Sweet Child o' Mine"
6. "Knockin' on Heaven's Door"
7. "You Could Be Mine"
8. "Street of Dreams (The Blues)"
9. "Out ta Get Me"
10. "November Rain"
11. "Better"
12. "My Michelle"
13. "I.R.S."
14. "Patience"
15. "Nightrain"

Encores:

16. "Rocket Queen"
17. "Madagascar"
18. "Paradise City"

=== Personnel ===
Two lineup changes happened on this leg of the tour: Ron "Bumblefoot" Thal replaced the departed Buckethead, and Frank Ferrer joined during the second half of the European tour after Brain left to be with his family after his daughter's birth. The line up of the European and North American Tours was:

- Axl Rose – lead vocals, piano, percussion
- Robin Finck – guitars, backing vocals
- Ron "Bumblefoot" Thal – guitars, backing vocals
- Richard Fortus – guitars, backing vocals
- Tommy Stinson – bass, backing vocals
- Frank Ferrer – drums, percussion
- Dizzy Reed – keyboards, piano, percussion, backing vocals
- Chris Pitman – keyboards, synthesizers, sub-bass, sampling, programming, tambourine, backing vocals
- Brain – drums, percussion (until replaced by Frank Ferrer)

Additional Musicians

- Izzy Stradlin – rhythm guitar, backing vocals (select dates in 2006)
- Sebastian Bach – co-lead vocals on "My Michelle"

=== Tour dates ===
Date	City	Country	Venue	Attendance	Notes
Warm-up shows
May 12, 2006	New York City	United States	Hammerstein Ballroom	3,600	Sold Out*
May 14, 2006	New York City	United States	Hammerstein Ballroom	3,600	Sold Out
May 15, 2006	New York City	United States	Hammerstein Ballroom	3,600	Sold Out
May 17, 2006	New York City	United States	Hammerstein Ballroom	3,600	Sold Out**
May 18, 2006	New York City	United States	The Plumm	900	Acoustic Show
Europe
May 25, 2006	Madrid	Spain	Parque Juan Carlos	10,000	
May 27, 2006	Lisbon	Portugal	Parque da Béla Vista	50,000	Festival
May 31, 2006	Budapest	Hungary	Budapest Arena	11,000	
June 2, 2006	Nürburg	Germany	Nürburgring	80,000	Festival
June 4, 2006	Milan	Italy	Idroscalo	30,000	Festival
June 7, 2006	London	England	Hammersmith Apollo	3,000	Sold Out
June 9, 2006	Dublin	Ireland	RDS Arena	30,000	Sold Out
June 11, 2006	Castle Donington	England	Donington Park	65,000	Festival**
June 13, 2006	Prague	Czech Republic	Sazka Arena	18,000	**
June 15, 2006	Warsaw	Poland	Stadion Wojska Polskiego	12,000	**
June 17, 2006	Burgenland	Austria	Pannonia Fields II	35,000	Festival**
June 20, 2006	Paris	France	POPB	15,000	**
June 24, 2006	Dessel	Belgium	Graspop Metal Meeting	35,000±	Festival
June 26, 2006	Stockholm	Sweden	Globen	15,000	Sold Out
June 28, 2006	Oslo	Norway	Oslo Spektrum	9,700	Sold Out
June 29, 2006	Roskilde	Denmark	Animal Showgrounds	80,000	Festival
July 1, 2006	Zurich	Switzerland	Hallenstadion	13,000	
July 2, 2006	Nijmegen	Netherlands	Goffertpark	25,000±	**
July 5, 2006	Helsinki	Finland	Hartwall Areena	10,000	Sold Out
July 6, 2006	Helsinki	Finland	Hartwall Areena	10,000	Sold Out
July 8, 2006	Oslo	Norway	Oslo Spektrum	9,700	Sold Out**
July 10, 2006	Athens	Greece	Terra Vibe Park	15,000	Festival**
July 12, 2006	Istanbul	Turkey	Kurucesme Arena	17,000	**
July 14, 2006	Bilbao	Spain	Kobetamendi	20,000	Festival**
July 15, 2006	El Ejido	Spain	Playa De Guardias Viejas	20,000	Festival**
July 18, 2006	Sheffield	England	Hallam FM Arena	12,500	**
July 19, 2006	Newcastle	England	Metro Radio Arena	11,000	Ended Earlier**
July 21, 2006	Glasgow	Scotland	SECC	10,000±	Sold Out**
July 23, 2006	Manchester	England	MEN Arena	19,388	**
July 25, 2006	Birmingham	England	NEC Arena	10,000±	Sold Out**
July 27, 2006	Nottingham	England	Nottingham Arena	10,288	Sold Out**
July 29, 2006	London	England	Wembley Arena	12,750	Sold Out**
July 30, 2006	London	England	Wembley Arena	12,750	Sold Out**

#	
*	First show for the new co-lead guitarist Ron "Bumblefoot" Thal.
**	Izzy Stradlin joined the band on stage.
***	Guns N' Roses were supposed to open for two dates of the Rolling Stones' A Bigger Bang Tour in Germany, but because of Keith Richards' infamous fall from a tree in Fiji, those shows were cancelled.

=== North American leg ===
On August 31, 2006, Axl Rose appeared on MTV Video Music Awards as a presenter, noting that the band would go on a North American tour on October 24. Five warm-up shows for the tour were held in September 2006, with two at the Hard Rock Hotel and Casino in Las Vegas two at Warfield Theatre in San Francisco and one show in Devore for KROQ's Inland Invasion 2006.

Following the band's appearance at Inland Invasion on September 23, a handful of subsequent warm-up shows were postponed, which led to rumors that this was carried out in order to finalize the work on the new album. The rumors were seemingly denied by manager Merck Mercuriadis, who stated that the shows had been merely moved to "fit in with the main body of the tour". He did, however, once again state that Chinese Democracy would be out before the end of the year. The actual tour, again called the Chinese Democracy Tour, was now scheduled to begin on October 20 in Jacksonville, Florida.

The Jacksonville show was moved to October 31, with the show of October 22 in Nashville, Tennessee, postponed up to January 2007, until being canceled in December. The tour commenced on October 24 in Sunrise, Florida, now ringing true to Rose's prior statement.

During the 2006 North American tour the band's opening acts included SuicideGirls, Papa Roach, Sebastian Bach, Die Mannequin and Helmet. The band were also joined onstage by former Gunner Izzy Stradlin and Metallica drummer Lars Ulrich both making one-off appearances. Bubbles, Ricky, and Julian of the Trailer Park Boys made some appearances in Canada. Long-time drummer Brain took a leave from his touring responsibilities before the October tour dates to spend more time with his family. He was replaced by his understudy Frank Ferrer. Brain did not return to the band and Ferrer became the band's full-time drummer.

Eagles of Death Metal were supposed to go on tour with Guns N' Roses. On November 24, 2006, in Cleveland, Ohio, during their first concert with Guns N' Roses, the band was not well received by the crowd. When Axl Rose came out to perform, he asked the crowd whether they enjoyed "the Pigeons of Shit Metal", following with an onstage announcement the band wouldn't open for the Guns during the remainder of the tour. Soon after, Eagles of Death Metal released a statement regarding the incident:

"At first the audience refused to welcome us to the jungle, but by the time we took our final bow, it had become paradise city. Although Axl tried to November rain on our parade, no sweet child o' mine can derail the EODM night train. We say live and let die."

==== Tour dates ====
Date	City	Country	Venue	Attendance	Notes
Warm-up shows
September 16, 2006	Paradise	United States	The Joint	3,000±	
September 17, 2006	Paradise	United States	The Joint	2,000±	
September 20, 2006	San Francisco	United States	Warfield Theatre	4,874	Sold Out
September 21, 2006	San Francisco	United States	Warfield Theatre	4,874	Sold Out
KROQ Inland Invasion
September 23, 2006	San Bernardino	United States	Hyundai Pavilion	30,000	Festival
Tour
October 24, 2006	Sunrise	United States	BankAtlantic Center	8,388	Sold Out
October 25, 2006	Tampa	United States	St. Pete Times Forum	10,534	Sold Out
October 27, 2006	Estero	United States	Germain Arena	6,000±	
October 29, 2006	San Juan	Puerto Rico	Coliseo de Puerto Rico	8,918	
October 31, 2006	Jacksonville	United States	Veterans Memorial Arena	5,000±	
November 2, 2006	Greensboro	United States	Greensboro Coliseum	4,389	
November 3, 2006	Huntington	United States	Huntington Civic Center	6,500	
November 5, 2006	East Rutherford	United States	Continental Airlines Arena	9,924	
~~November 6, 2006~~	Portland	United States	Cumberland Civic Center		Cancelled
November 8, 2006	Worcester	United States	DCU Center	10,000±	
November 10, 2006	New York City	United States	Madison Square Garden	14,482	Sold Out
November 13, 2006	Baltimore	United States	1st Mariner Arena	5,257	
November 15, 2006	Toronto	Canada	Air Canada Centre	13,051	Sold Out
November 17, 2006	Ottawa	Canada	Scotiabank Place	9,722	Sold Out
November 18, 2006	Quebec City	Canada	Colisée Pepsi	9,729	
November 20, 2006	Halifax	Canada	Halifax Metro Centre	7,880	
November 21, 2006	Saint John	Canada	Harbour Station	5,145	Sold Out
November 24, 2006	Cleveland	United States	Quicken Loans Arena	6,757	
November 25, 2006	Auburn Hills	United States	The Palace of Auburn Hills	6,313	
November 27, 2006	Rosemont	United States	Allstate Arena	9,599	
~~November 29, 2006~~	Milwaukee	United States	Bradley Center		Cancelled
December 1, 2006	Ames	United States	Hilton Coliseum	4,438	
December 2, 2006	Minneapolis	United States	Target Center	7,241	
December 4, 2006	Winnipeg	Canada	MTS Centre	9,284	Sold Out
December 6, 2006	Calgary	Canada	Pengrowth Saddledome	13,370	Sold Out
December 7, 2006	Edmonton	Canada	Rexall Place	13,355	Sold Out
December 10, 2006	Everett	United States	Everett Events Center	5,868	
December 11, 2006	Portland	United States	Rose Garden Arena	9,000±	
~~December 13, 2006~~	Fresno	United States	Save Mart Center		Cancelled
December 15, 2006	Oakland	United States	Oracle Arena	5,786	*
December 17, 2006	Universal City	United States	Gibson Amphitheatre	6,189	Sold Out**
December 19, 2006	Universal City	United States	Gibson Amphitheatre	6,189	Sold Out**
December 20, 2006	Universal City	United States	Gibson Amphitheatre	6,189	Sold Out**
~~January 10, 2007~~	Sacramento	United States	ARCO Arena		Cancelled ***
~~January 11, 2007~~	Bakersfield	United States	Rabobank Arena		Cancelled ***
~~January 13, 2007~~	Reno	United States	Reno Events Center		Cancelled ***
~~January 16, 2007~~	San Diego	United States	iPayOne Center		Cancelled ***

#		Source
*	Lars Ulrich performed on drums with GN'R.	
**	Izzy Stradlin joined the band on stage.	
**	Cancelled in order for the band to complete the album in January to have a March 2007 tentative release date. However, the album wasn't completed in time for a March 6 release.	

=== 2007 World Tour ===
Chinese Democracy Tour 2007 was a continuation of the previous tour promoting Chinese Democracy. The album had a tentative release date in March according to Axl Rose, but it did not materialize. The band continued touring in Mexico, Australia, New Zealand and Japan. Mucc was the opening act for the Japanese leg of the tour. They also performed two songs at Rodeo Drive's Walk of Style.

=== Walk of Style Ceremony ===
This performance featured keyboardist Chris Pitman on bass guitar, as Tommy Stinson was unable to attend due to a personal family issue. They played acoustic versions of "Knockin' On Heaven's Door" and "Sweet Child O' Mine" to close out the ceremony.

=== Tour dates ===
Date	City	Country	Venue	Attendance	Notes
Walk of Style ceremony
February 8, 2007	Beverly Hills	United States	Rodeo Drive		Walk of Style ceremony in honor of Donatella and Gianni Versace.
My Coke Festival
April 27, 2007	Johannesburg	South Africa	New Market Racetrack		Cancelled
May 1, 2007	Cape Town	South Africa	Kenilworth Racetrack		Cancelled
Mexico
June 2, 2007	Monterrey	Mexico	Monterrey Arena	17,600	Sold Out
June 3, 2007	Guadalajara	Mexico	Arena VFG	32,572	Sold Out
June 5, 2007	Mexico City	Mexico	Palacio de los Deportes	20,255	Sold Out
Oceania
June 10, 2007	Perth	Australia	Burswood Dome	17,000	Sold Out
June 13, 2007	Adelaide	Australia	Entertainment Centre	8,000	
June 15, 2007	Melbourne	Australia	Rod Laver Arena	14,000	Sold Out
June 16, 2007	Melbourne	Australia	Rod Laver Arena	14,000	Sold Out
June 20, 2007	Brisbane	Australia	Entertainment Centre	11,000±	Sold Out
June 21, 2007	Brisbane	Australia	Entertainment Centre	10,000±	
June 23, 2007	Sydney	Australia	Acer Arena	20,000	Sold Out
June 24, 2007	Sydney	Australia	Acer Arena	20,000	Sold Out
June 29, 2007	Auckland	New Zealand	Vector Arena	12,000	Sold Out
June 30, 2007	Auckland	New Zealand	Vector Arena	10,000±	
July 3, 2007	Christchurch	New Zealand	Westpac Arena	8,000	Sold Out
Live Earth
July 7, 2007	Rio de Janeiro	Brazil	Copacabana Beach		Scrapped
Asia
July 14, 2007	Chiba	Japan	Makuhari Messe	17,000	Sold Out
July 15, 2007	Chiba	Japan	Makuhari Messe	12,000±	
July 17, 2007	Nagoya	Japan	Nippon Gaishi Hall	12,000	Sold Out
July 18, 2007	Tokyo	Japan	Nippon Budokan	9,000	
July 21, 2007	Osaka	Japan	Intex Osaka	10,000±	Sold Out

== 2009–2011 World Tour ==
Rumors started in February that Guns N' Roses would perform Spain and Italy in June, and continued through the year with comments from Irving Azoff about a Summer Stadium Tour but nothing happened.

On November 10, 2009, after speculation about shows in Japan, the band announced on their MySpace four dates in Asia and thirteen in Canada. More dates were added later for South America and Europe.

On August 15, 2010, a cancellation notice for the remaining shows of the tour was posted on Rose's Twitter. The statement would later be refuted on the official Guns N' Roses Twitter and Facebook, with claims that the tweets were being looked into. Several hours later, the band confirmed that Axl's account had been hacked, and the band would in fact continue the tour.

Following the events that took place at the Reading Festival where the organizers pulled the plug on their set because they passed the curfew time, Axl Rose said his Twitter account criticizing the organizers for failing to factor in the set change times.

Towards the end of the European leg, Duff McKagan joined Guns N' Roses onstage for the first time in seventeen years on October 14, playing bass on "You Could Be Mine" and guitar on "Knockin' on Heaven's Door", "Nice Boys" and "Patience" at London's O2 Arena.

On November 5, 2010, DJ Ashba confirmed the tour would continue across the U.S. in 2011. On October 2, 2011, the band came back to South America playing Rock In Rio in front of 100,000 people. After passing through Argentina, Chile and Paraguay, the first US tour in five years took place with positive reviews.

=== Set list ===
All of the songs from Chinese Democracy with the exception of "Riad N' The Bedouins" were played at the show in Tokyo, along with 9 songs from Appetite for Destruction. A cover of AC/DC's "Whole Lotta Rosie" has also been frequently played. In 2011, the band added "Estranged" to the set. The Tokyo setlist below is the longest set Guns N' Roses has ever played. The setlist on the right is a typical setlist from the 2011 tour.

December 19, 2009 – Tokyo Dome, Tokyo, Japan

Main set:

1. "Chinese Democracy"
2. "Welcome to the Jungle"
3. "It's So Easy"
4. "Mr. Brownstone"
5. "Catcher in the Rye"
6. "Sorry"
7. "If the World"
8. "Live and Let Die"
9. "Street of Dreams"
10. "You Could Be Mine"
11. "Rocket Queen"
12. "My Michelle"
13. "Sweet Child o' Mine"
14. "Shackler's Revenge"
15. "I.R.S."
16. "November Rain"
17. "Whole Lotta Rosie"
18. "Knockin' on Heaven's Door"
19. "Scraped"
20. "Prostitute"
21. "This I Love"
22. "Out ta Get Me"
23. "Don't Cry" (Original)
24. "Nightrain"

Encore:

25. "Madagascar"
26. "There Was a Time"
27. "My Generation"
28. "Better"
29. "Patience"
30. "Nice Boys"
31. "Paradise City"

November 19, 2011 – The Comcast Theatre, Hartford, Connecticut

Main set:

1. "Chinese Democracy"
2. "Welcome to the Jungle"
3. "It's So Easy"
4. "Mr. Brownstone"
5. "Sorry"
6. "Riff Raff"
7. "Estranged"
8. "Better"
9. "Rocket Queen"
10. "Live and Let Die"
11. "This I Love"
12. "Shackler's Revenge"
13. "My Generation"
14. "Street of Dreams"
15. "You Could Be Mine"
16. "Sweet Child o' Mine"
17. "November Rain"
18. "Don't Cry" (Original)
19. "Whole Lotta Rosie"
20. "Out ta Get Me"
21. "Knockin' on Heaven's Door"
22. "Nightrain"

Encore:

23. "Madagascar"
24. "Nice Boys"
25. "Patience"
26. "Paradise City"

=== Personnel ===
The only lineup change for this tour was that of guitarist DJ Ashba replacing the departed Robin Finck.

- Axl Rose – lead vocals, piano, whistle, whistling
- Dizzy Reed – keyboards, piano, percussion, backing vocals
- Tommy Stinson – bass, backing vocals, lead vocals
- DJ Ashba – lead guitar, rhythm guitar, snare drum on "Madagascar"
- Ron "Bumblefoot" Thal – lead guitar, rhythm guitar, acoustic guitar, backing vocals
- Richard Fortus – rhythm guitar, lead guitar, acoustic guitar, slide guitar, backing vocals
- Chris Pitman – keyboards, synthesizer, sub-bass, samples, programming, tambourine, backing vocals
- Frank Ferrer – drums, tambourine

Additional Musicians

- Duff McKagan – rhythm guitar, bass guitar, backing vocals (select dates in 2010 and 2011)

=== Tour dates ===
Date	City	Country	Venue	Attendance	Notes
Asia
December 11, 2009	Taipei	Taiwan	Banqiao Stadium	20,000	Sold Out*
December 13, 2009	Seoul	South Korea	Olympic Arena	6,000	
December 16, 2009	Osaka	Japan	Osaka Dome	36,000	Sold Out
December 19, 2009	Tokyo	Japan	Tokyo Dome	30,000	**
North America #1
January 13, 2010	Winnipeg	Canada	MTS Centre	8,500	
January 16, 2010	Calgary	Canada	Pengrowth Saddledome	9,000	
January 17, 2010	Edmonton	Canada	Rexall Place	9,800	
January 19, 2010	Saskatoon	Canada	Credit Union Centre	9,000	
January 20, 2010	Regina	Canada	Brandt Centre	6,000	
January 24, 2010	Hamilton	Canada	Copps Coliseum	6,500	
January 25, 2010	London	Canada	John Labatt Centre	6,000	
January 27, 2010	Montreal	Canada	Bell Centre	15,000	Sold Out
January 28, 2010	Toronto	Canada	Air Canada Centre	21,000	Sold Out
January 31, 2010	Ottawa	Canada	Scotiabank Place	8,000	
February 1, 2010	Quebec City	Canada	Colisée Pepsi	6,500	
February 3, 2010	Moncton	Canada	Moncton Coliseum	6,000±	
February 4, 2010	Halifax	Canada	Metro Centre	10,000	
South America #1
March 7, 2010	Brasília	Brazil	Ginásio Nilson Nelson	13,000	Sold Out
March 10, 2010	Belo Horizonte	Brazil	Mineirinho	15,000	Sold Out
March 13, 2010	São Paulo	Brazil	Estádio Palestra Itália	38,000	Sold Out
March 16, 2010	Porto Alegre	Brazil	Estacionamento da Fiergs	17,000	Sold Out
March 18, 2010	Montevideo	Uruguay	Estadio Centenario	40,000	Sold Out
March 20, 2010	Santiago	Chile	Movistar Arena	15,000	Sold Out
March 22, 2010	Buenos Aires	Argentina	José Amalfitani Stadium	45,000	Sold Out
March 25, 2010	Lima	Peru	Estadio Monumental	30,000	Sold Out
March 27, 2010	Caracas	Venezuela	Poliedro de Caracas	7,000	
March 30, 2010	Bogotá	Colombia	Parque Jaime Duque	20,000	
April 1, 2010	Quito	Ecuador	Estadio Olímpico	38,000	Sold Out
April 4, 2010	Rio de Janeiro	Brazil	Praça da Apoteose	30,000	Sold Out***
North America #2
April 7, 2010	Panama City	Panama	Figali Convention Center	15,000	Sold Out
April 11, 2010	San Salvador	El Salvador	Estadio Cuscatlán	25,000±	Sold Out
~~April 12, 2010~~	Guatemala City	Guatemala	Estadio del Ejército		Cancelled
~~April 13, 2010~~	San Jose	Costa Rica	Estadio Morera Soto		Cancelled
April 15, 2010	San Juan	Puerto Rico	Coliseo Roberto Clemente	15,000	
Europe #1
May 31, 2010	Bergen	Norway	Vestlandshallen	6,500	
June 2, 2010	Oslo	Norway	Oslo Spektrum	6,000	
June 5, 2010	Helsinki	Finland	Käpylä Sportspark	15,000	Festival
June 6, 2010	St. Petersburg	Russia	Ice Palace	15,000	
June 8, 2010	Moscow	Russia	Olympiysky Stadium	18,000	Sold Out
June 12, 2010	Sölvesborg	Sweden	Norje Havsbad	33,000	Festival
June 14, 2010	Aalborg	Denmark	Gigantium	8,000	
Rock N' Rev Festival
August 13, 2010	Sturgis	United States	Monkey Rock USA	18,000	Festival
Europe #2
August 27, 2010	Reading	England	Little John's Farm	88,000	Festival
August 29, 2010	Leeds	England	Bramham Park	70,000	Festival
August 31, 2010	Belfast	Northern Ireland	Odyssey Arena	14,000	Sold Out
September 1, 2010	Dublin	Ireland	The O2	14,000	Sold Out
September 4, 2010	Rome	Italy	Palalottomatica	13,000	Sold Out
September 5, 2010	Milan	Italy	Mediolanum Forum	12,000	Sold Out
September 8, 2010	Zurich	Switzerland	Hallenstadion	13,000	Sold Out
September 10, 2010	Amnéville	France	Galaxie	12,000	
September 13, 2010	Paris	France	Bercy	17,000	Sold Out
September 16, 2010	Geneva	Switzerland	Geneva Arena	9,500	Sold Out
September 18, 2010	Vienna	Austria	Wiener Stadthalle	15,000	Sold Out
September 21, 2010	Bucharest	Romania	Romexpo	30,000	Sold Out
September 23, 2010	Belgrade	Serbia	Belgrade Arena	14,000	Sold Out
September 24, 2010	Zagreb	Croatia	Arena Zagreb	15,000	
September 27, 2010	Prague	Czech Republic	O2 Arena	16,000	Sold Out
September 30, 2010	Antwerp	Belgium	Sportpaleis	13,000	
October 2, 2010	Lille	France	Zénith de Lille	7,000	
October 3, 2010	Arnhem	Netherlands	GelreDome XS	12,000	
October 6, 2010	Lisbon	Portugal	Pavilhão Atlântico	20,000	Sold Out
October 9, 2010	Madrid	Spain	Palacio de Vistalegre	10,000	Sold Out
October 10, 2010	San Sebastián	Spain	Velódromo de Anoeta	7,000	
October 13, 2010	London	England	The O2 Arena	23,000	Sold Out
October 14, 2010	London	England	The O2 Arena	20,000	Sold Out ****
October 17, 2010	Birmingham	England	LG Arena	12,000	Sold Out
October 18, 2010	Manchester	England	M.E.N. Arena	15,000	Sold Out
October 22, 2010	Zaragoza	Spain	Pabellón Príncipe Felipe	7,000	
October 23, 2010	Barcelona	Spain	Palau Municipal	10,000	Sold Out
Australia
December 1, 2010	Townsville	Australia	Reid Park	16,000	Sold Out
December 4, 2010	Sydney	Australia	ANZ Stadium	40,000	V8 Supercars
December 7, 2010	Adelaide	Australia	Entertainment Centre	8,000	
December 11, 2010	Perth	Australia	Perth Motorplex	15,000	
Yas Island Show
December 16, 2010	Abu Dhabi	United Arab Emirates	Du Arena	21,000	Sold Out
South America #2
October 2, 2011	Rio de Janeiro	Brazil	Cidade do Rock	100,000	Festival *****
October 5, 2011	Santiago	Chile	Movistar Arena	15,000	Sold Out
October 8, 2011	La Plata	Argentina	Estadio de La Plata	50,000	
October 10, 2011	Rosario	Argentina	Salón Metropolitano	6,000	Sold Out
October 12, 2011	Córdoba	Argentina	Orfeo Superdomo	10,000±	
October 12, 2011	La Paz	Bolivia	Estadio Rafael Castellón		Cancelled
October 15, 2011	Asunción	Paraguay	Hipódromo de Asunción	70,000	Sold Out
North America #3
October 18, 2011	Mexico City	Mexico	Palacio de los Deportes	20,000	Sold Out
October 19, 2011	Mexico City	Mexico	Palacio de los Deportes	15,000±	
October 22, 2011	Guadalajara	Mexico	Arena VFG	10,000	
October 23, 2011	Monterrey	Mexico	Monterrey Arena	8,000	
October 28, 2011	Orlando	United States	Amway Center	5,240	
October 29, 2011	Miami	United States	American Airlines Arena	8,170	
October 31, 2011	Greenville	United States	BI-LO Center	6,000	
November 2, 2011	Atlanta	United States	Philips Arena	7,873	
November 4, 2011	Houston	United States	Toyota Center	Unknown	
November 5, 2011	Dallas	United States	Gexa Energy Pavilion	12,000	
November 8, 2011	Omaha	United States	Qwest Center Omaha	Unknown	
November 9, 2011	Norman	United States	Lloyd Noble Center	7,000	
November 12, 2011	Kansas City	United States	Sprint Center	6,756	
November 13, 2011	Minneapolis	United States	Target Center	6,761	
November 15, 2011	Rosemont	United States	Allstate Arena	9,351	
November 17, 2011	East Rutherford	United States	Izod Center	14,000	
November 19, 2011	Hartford	United States	The Comcast Theatre	7,500	Sold Out
November 20, 2011	Wilkes-Barre	United States	Mohegan Sun Arena	Unknown	
November 23, 2011	Albany	United States	Times Union Center		Cancelled
November 25, 2011	Worcester	United States	DCU Center	5,097	
November 26, 2011	Camden	United States	Susquehanna Bank Center	6,500	Sold Out
November 28, 2011	Hamilton	Canada	Copps Coliseum	7,000	
December 1, 2011	Auburn Hills	United States	The Palace of Auburn Hills	7,969	
December 2, 2011	Cincinnati	United States	U.S. Bank Arena		
December 4, 2011	Nashville	United States	Bridgestone Arena	5,769	******
December 5, 2011	Southaven	United States	DeSoto Civic Center		Cancelled
December 7, 2011	Youngstown	United States	Covelli Centre		
December 8, 2011	Indianapolis	United States	Conseco Fieldhouse		*******
December 11, 2011	Broomfield	United States	1stBank Center		*******
December 13, 2011	West Valley City	United States	Maverik Center		*******
December 16, 2011	Seattle	United States	KeyArena		
December 17, 2011	Vancouver	Canada	Pacific Coliseum		********
December 21, 2011	Inglewood	United States	The Forum		
December 27, 2011	Phoenix	United States	Comerica Theatre		
December 30, 2011	Paradise	United States	The Joint	3,000±	
December 31, 2011	Paradise	United States	The Joint	3,895	Sold Out

#		Source
*	First show since the release of Chinese Democracy.	
**	Longest GN'R show ever – 3 hours, 37 minutes.	
***	Rescheduled from March 14 due to stage collapsing in extreme weather.	
****	Duff McKagan plays with Guns N' Roses for the first time since 1993. He plays bass on You Could Be Mine and guitar on Nice Boys, Knockin' on Heaven's Door and Patience.	
*****	First performance of Estranged in 18 years.	
******	First performance of Civil War since February 1993.	
*******	Zakk Wylde joins the band for "Whole Lotta Rosie".	
********	Duff McKagan joins the band for "You Could Be Mine" and "Civil War".	

== Supporting acts ==
- 2001 (Rock in Rio): Pato Fú, Carlinhos Brown, IRA! e Ultraje a Rigor, Papa Roach and Oasis
- 2002 (Europe): Weezer, Slipknot (Leeds Festival only)
- 2002 (North America): CKY and Mix Master Mike
- 2006 (Europe): Living Things, Sex Action, Funeral For A Friend, To My Surprise, Stone Sour, The Darkness, Xutos e Pontapés, Pitty, Oddzial Zamkniety, Shakra, Amulet, 4Lyn, Sebastian Bach, Papa Roach, Bullet for My Valentine, Melrose, Shakerleg, Avenged Sevenfold and Towers of London
- 2006 (North America): Phantom Planet, Hoobastank, Sebastian Bach, Papa Roach, The Suicide Girls, Die Mannequin, Novadriver, Modern Day Zero and Helmet
- 2007 (Mexico): The Volture and Maligno
- 2007 (Oceania): Sebastian Bach and Rose Tattoo
- 2007 (Japan): Mucc
- 2009 (Taiwan): Matzka
- 2009 (Korea): GUMX
- 2009 (Japan): Mucc
- 2010 (Canada): Sebastian Bach and Danko Jones
- 2010 (Latin America): Sebastian Bach, Puya, Vivora, Angelus, Armand DJ, Océano, Los 33, Black Drawing Chalks, Rockvox, Viuda Negra, León Bruno, Electrocirkus, Pixel, Gaia, Space Bee, Massacre, La Mancha de Rolando, Killterry, Vendetta, ReyToro, Rosa Tattooada, Rock Rocket, Forgotten Boys, Khalice
- 2010 (Europe): Danko Jones, Murderdolls, Sebastian Bach, Imperial State Electric and Night Shift
- 2010 (Australia): Korn, Spiderbait, Shihad and The Delta Riggs
- 2010 (United Arab Emirates): Juliana Down
- 2011 (Rock in Rio): System of a Down, Evanescence, Detonautas and Pitty
- 2011 (Latin America): Dion, Utopians, La Mancha de Rolando, El bordo, Poc, The Volture and Agora
- 2011 (North America): Buckcherry, The Sword, Reverend Horton Heat, Hinder, Adelitas Way, Asking Alexandria, Sebastian Bach, Black Label Society, The Pretty Reckless, Loaded, Steel Panther and The Crystal Method

== Songs played ==
Guns N' Roses relied on an Appetite for Destruction heavy set list while adding new songs from the upcoming album Chinese Democracy, such as "Street of Dreams (The Blues)", "Madagascar" and the title track. In 2006, with regard to the leaks, Rose commented, "This is for all you downloading fuckers" and added "Better" and "I.R.S." (more often than not played) and "There Was a Time" (less often) to the set list.

Songs played between January 1, 2001, and December 31, 2011.

Album	Song	Times
Appetite for Destruction (1987)	"Welcome to the Jungle"	235
Appetite for Destruction	"It's So Easy"	232
Appetite for Destruction	"Nightrain"	229
Appetite for Destruction	"Out Ta Get Me"	136
Appetite for Destruction	"Mr. Brownstone"	234
Appetite for Destruction	"Paradise City"	233
Appetite for Destruction	"My Michelle"	110
Appetite for Destruction	"Think About You"	49
Appetite for Destruction	"Sweet Child o' Mine"	235
Appetite for Destruction	"You're Crazy"	2
Appetite for Destruction	"Rocket Queen"	162
G N' R Lies (1988)	"Nice Boys"	13
G N' R Lies	"Patience"	185
G N' R Lies	"Used to Love Her"	37
G N' R Lies	"You're Crazy"	5
Use Your Illusion I (1991)	"Live and Let Die"	229
Use Your Illusion I	"Don't Cry"	68
Use Your Illusion I	"November Rain"	230
Use Your Illusion II (1991)	"Civil War"	10
Use Your Illusion II	"Knockin' on Heaven's Door"	235
Use Your Illusion II	"Estranged"	39
Use Your Illusion II	"You Could Be Mine"	231
"The Spaghetti Incident?" (1993)	"Down on the Farm"	10
Chinese Democracy (2008)	"Chinese Democracy"	181
Chinese Democracy	"Shackler's Revenge"	63
Chinese Democracy	"Better"	187
Chinese Democracy	"Street of Dreams"	231
Chinese Democracy	"If the World"	27
Chinese Democracy	"There Was a Time"	6
Chinese Democracy	"Catcher in The Rye"	8
Chinese Democracy	"Scraped"	12
Chinese Democracy	"Riad N' the Bedouins"	6
Chinese Democracy	"Sorry"	111
Chinese Democracy	"I.R.S."	96
Chinese Democracy	"Madagascar"	186
Chinese Democracy	"This I Love"	100
Chinese Democracy	"Prostitute"	2
End of Days Soundtrack	"Oh My God"	5
Unreleased	"Silkworms"	4
