= Pigs (Asphalt Ballet album) =

Studio album by Asphalt Ballet
- Released: 1993
- Recorded: 1993
- Genre: Hard rock
- Length: 51:06
- Label: Virgin
- Producer: Greg Edward

Asphalt Ballet chronology
| Asphalt Ballet (1991) | Pigs (1993) |

Pigs is the second album by Asphalt Ballet, released on Virgin Records in 1993. Tommy Dean joined on vocals. It was the band's final album.

Asphalt Ballet supported the album with a North American tour that included shows with Great White.

== Critical reception ==
Professional ratings
Review scores
| Source | Rating |
|---|---|
| AllMusic | 1.5/5 stars |
| Rock Hard | 7.0/10 |

The San Diego Union-Tribune stated that Asphalt Ballet "roars through the heavy-metal catalog with maximum speed and skill, minimum fuss and a welcome lack of pretense."

AllMusic wrote that the band "made a play at musical relevance via aggro alt-rock, rather than the bluesy hard rock the group displayed a minor flair for on their 1991 debut."

== Track listing ==
All tracks are written by Asphalt Ballet, except where noted.

| No. | Title | Writer(s) | Length |
|---|---|---|---|
| 1. | "Angry Youth" | | 3:26 |
| 2. | "Weeds" | | 4:57 |
| 3. | "Daddy's Dyin'" | | 4:11 |
| 4. | "Outta Hand" | | 4:01 |
| 5. | "Save the Children" | | 5:05 |
| 6. | "Pigs" | | 3:16 |
| 7. | "Crash Diet" | Axl Rose, West Arkeen, Del James, Danny Clarke | 3:11 |
| 8. | "Dead Horse Kick" | | 3:14 |
| 9. | "Nothing to Do with Anything" | | 4:29 |
| 10. | "Mercy" | | 4:25 |
| 11. | "Down to the Money" | | 3:53 |
| 12. | "Pay for What You Want" | | 3:30 |
| 13. | "Anybody" | | 3:30 |
| Total length: | | | 51:06 |

== Personnel ==
- Tommy Dean – Vocals
- Terry Phillips – Bass
- Julius Ulrich – Guitar
- Danny Clarke – Guitar
- Mikki Kiner – Drums
