= One in a Million (Guns N' Roses song) =

Song by Guns N' Roses

from the album G N' R Lies
- Released: November 30, 1988 (US); December 17, 1988 (UK)
- Recorded: 1988
- Studio: Rumbo Studios, Take One Studio and Image Studio
- Genre: Folk rock; acoustic rock; southern rock
- Length: 6:09
- Label: Geffen Records
- Songwriter: Guns N' Roses
- Producers: Guns N' Roses; Mike Clink

"One in a Million" is the eighth track on American rock band Guns N' Roses' 1988 album G N' R Lies. It was based on singer Axl Rose's experience of getting hustled at a Greyhound bus station when he first came to Los Angeles.

== Composition ==
"I came up with 'We tried to reach you but you were much too high,'" Rose told Mick Wall. "I was picturing [friends] trying to call me if, like, I disappeared or died… The chorus – 'You're one in a million' – someone said that to me once, real sarcastically. And it stuck with me… When I said 'Police and niggers/that's right,' that was to fuck with (band associate) Wes (Arkeen)'s head. 'Cos he couldn't believe I would write that… The chorus came about because I was getting, like, really far away; like 'Rocket Man', Elton John… Like in my head. Getting really far away from all my friends and family in Indiana." Slash said of the song's lyrics "Have you ever been hassled by someone with a gun and a badge? Maybe you've been conned or had someone attempt to sell you stolen property and they just won't take no for an answer. Have you ever been to a gas station or convenience store and been treated like you don't belong there by an individual who can barely speak English? Hopefully not, but have you ever been attacked by a homosexual? Has some so-called religionist tried to con you out of your hard-earned cash? Have you ever been banned or censored by a relatively small group of people claiming to be a majority with self-righteous and dangerous motives? This song is very simple and extremely generic. My apologies to those who may take offense."

== Reception ==
Accusations of homophobia, nativism, and racism were leveled against Rose, owing to lyrics that included the slurs "nigger" and "faggot". Critic Jon Pareles noted that "with 'One in a Million' on G 'n' R Lies, the band tailored its image to appeal to white, heterosexual, nativist prejudices, denouncing blacks, immigrants and gays while coyly apologizing 'to those who may take offense' in the album notes." OC Register writer Cary Darling was among the first critics to react negatively to the song, calling it "the most repellent slice of right-wing paranoia ever to be released by a major label."

In a 1989 Rolling Stone interview, Rose explained the lyrics:

I used words like police and niggers because you're not allowed to use the word 'nigger.' Why can black people go up to each other and say 'Nigger,' but when a white guy does it all of a sudden it's a big putdown? I don't like boundaries of any kind. I don't like being told what I can and what I can't say. I used the word 'nigger' because it's a word to describe somebody that is basically a pain in your life, a problem. The word 'nigger' doesn't necessarily mean black. Doesn't John Lennon have a song "Woman Is the Nigger of the World"? There's a rap group, N.W.A. – Niggers with Attitude. I mean, they're proud of that word. More power to them. Guns n' Roses ain't bad . . . N.W.A. is baaad! Mr. Bob Goldthwait said the only reason we put these lyrics on the record was because it would cause controversy and we'd sell a million albums. Fuck him! Why'd he put us in his skit? We don't just do something to get the controversy, the press.

The cover of GN'R Lies—a mock-tabloid newspaper design—contained an apology for the song, suggesting controversy was anticipated. A small "article" entitled "One in a Million", credited to Rose, ended: "This song is very simple and extremely generic or generalized, my apologies to those who may take offense".

In response to accusations of homophobia, Rose initially stated that he was "pro-heterosexual" and "I'm not against them doing what they want to do as long as it's not hurting anybody else and they're not forcing it upon me", and spoke of negative experiences in his past, such as a seemingly friendly man who let him crash on his hotel room floor, then tried to rape him. He later softened this stance and insisted that he was not homophobic, pointing out that some of his heroes, such as Freddie Mercury and Elton John, as well as David Geffen, the head of his record label, were bisexual or gay.

Others—including music industry peers—accused Rose of racism for the use of the word "niggers". When Guns N' Roses and Living Colour supported the Rolling Stones for a concert in Los Angeles in 1989, Living Colour guitarist Vernon Reid publicly commented on "One in a Million" during his band's set. Hearing this, Rose suggested they play the song in their act, "just to piss them off".

The controversy surrounding the song led to Guns N' Roses being dropped from the roster of an AIDS benefit show in New York organized by the Gay Men's Health Crisis.

By 1992, however, Rose seemed to have gained a new perspective on the song and its lyrics. "I was pissed off about some black people that were trying to rob me," he said. "I wanted to insult those particular black people. I didn't want to support racism. When I used the word faggots, I wasn't coming down on gays. I was coming down on an element of gays... I've had my share of dealings with aggressive gays, and I was bothered by it. The Bible says, "Thou shalt not judge," and I guess I made a judgment call, and it was an insult. The racist thing, that's just stupid. I can understand how people would think that, but that's not how I meant it". He also stated "The most important thing about "One in a Million" is that it got people to think about racism. A lot of people thought I was talking about entire races or sectors of people. I wasn't. And there was an apology on the record. The apology is not even written that well, but it's not on the cover of every record. And no one has acknowledged it yet." In his final public comments about the song in 1992, Rose stated, "It was a way for me to express my anger at how vulnerable I felt in certain situations that had gone down in my life".

In 2001, Guns N' Roses then-manager Doug Goldstein said of the song, "He was making a joke about how stupid people were in Indiana... He was showing the phobias of a 17-year-old boy arriving in Los Angeles and being afraid of minorities because he didn't know them in his homeland. I keep telling him to explain it, but he says, ‘Did people ask Picasso to explain his work? I'm an artist.’ He says that if [John] Lennon had written that song, people would understand".

The song would continue to be decried, as publications such as WMMR, Loudwire, and Jay Busbee listed it last or near-last when ranking Guns N' Roses songs from best to worst.

"One in a Million" was not included on a 2018 box-set reissue of Appetite for Destruction, which featured the remaining G N' R Lies songs on a bonus disc. Slash explained it had been a collective decision, which didn't require a "big roundtable thing".

== Response from Guns N' Roses ==
Before the release of Lies, the other members of the band tried in vain to make Rose drop the track from the record. Steven Adler exclaimed "What the fuck? Is this necessary?", to which Rose responded "Yeah, it's necessary. I'm letting my feelings out." Slash, whose mother is black, noted that he did not condone the song but did not condemn his bandmate, commenting in 1991 Rolling Stone interview: "When Axl first came up with the song and really wanted to do it, I said I didn't think it was very cool... I don't regret doing 'One in a Million', I just regret what we've been through because of it and the way people have perceived our personal feelings."

In 1988, rhythm guitarist Izzy Stradlin told rock critic Nick Kent that the lyrics simply reflected the poor race relations of inner city Los Angeles.

In a 2019 interview, Duff McKagan said: "One thing about Axl is if you’re going to try to compete with him intellectually, you’ve lost, because he’s a super smart guy... He’s a super sensitive dude who does his studies. When we did that song, I was still drinking but he was way ahead of us with his vision of, ‘Something’s gotta be said.’ That was the most hardcore way to say it. So flash-forward to now. So many people have misinterpreted that song that we removed it ... Nobody got it.”

== Personnel ==
- W. Axl Rose – lead vocals, piano
- Slash – lead acoustic guitar
- Izzy Stradlin – rhythm guitar
- Duff "Rose" McKagan – rhythm acoustic guitar
- Steven Adler – percussion
