= The Language of Fear =

1995 book by Del James

- First edition
- Author: Del James
- Language: English
- Published: 1995
- Publication place: United States

The Language of Fear is the first book by author and journalist Del James. It has 339 pages and is a collection of short dark fiction stories, released in 1995 by Dell Books, a division of Bantam Doubleday Publishing, part of the "Abyss" line of psychological horror. It features an intro by W. Axl Rose and the short story entitled "Without You," which inspired the Guns N' Roses video "November Rain". The book is long out of print, but copies can sell for a few pounds on online auction sites.

On 4 March 2008, a MySpace bulletin was sent from the Guns N' Roses MySpace page, announcing the re-printing of The Language of Fear.

== Contents ==
- Introduction by W. Axl Rose
- "A Tale of Two Heroines"
- "Adult Nature Material"
- "Bloodlust"
- "Date Rape"
- "High School Memoirs"
- "Mama's Boy"
- "Mindwarp"
- "Saltwater and Blood"
- "Skin Deep"
- "The Atheist Prayer"
- "The Fumes of Friendship"
- "The Immortals"
- "The Melrose Vampire"
- "The Nerve"
- "Without You"
