= Blood on the Highway (EP) =

Asphalt Ballet

EP (Studio/Live) by Asphalt Ballet
- Released: 1991
- Recorded: 1991
- Genre: Blues rock, Hard rock, Southern rock
- Length: 22:53
- Label: Virgin
- Producer: Greg Edward for Reflex Productions/Greg Edwards

Blood on the Highway is an EP by Asphalt Ballet released by Virgin Records in 1991. It contains five tracks that were recorded live in the studio as part of a rehearsal for their tour.

== Track listing ==
No.	Title	Writer(s)	Length
1.	"Blood on the Highway" (Album version)	Julius Ulrich, Gary Jeffries	4:00
2.	"Hangman Swing" (Live studio rehearsal)	Danny Clarke, Ulrich	3:25
3.	"Suicide Saloon" (Live studio rehearsal - non-album track)	Clarke, Ulrich	4:06
4.	"Flesh and Bone" (Live studio rehearsal - non-album track)	Clarke, Ulrich	2:53
5.	"Unlucky Mr. Lucky" (Live studio rehearsal)	Ulrich, Clarke, Kiner	4:03
6.	"Taking a Walk" (Live studio rehearsal)	Ulrich	4:20
Total length:			22:53

== Personnel ==
- Gary Jeffries - Vocals and Harmonica
- Terry Phillips - Bass
- Julius Ulrich - Guitar
- Danny Clarke - Guitar
- Mikki Kiner - Drums
