= November Rain =

1992 single by Guns N' Roses

Single by Guns N' Roses

from the album Use Your Illusion I
- B-side: "Sweet Child o' Mine" (LP version)
- Released: February 24, 1992
- Studio: A&M; Record Plant; Studio 56; Image Recording; Conway; Northstar Recordings (violins); Metalworks Recording; Skip Saylor Recording (album mixing)
- Genre: Hard rock; progressive rock
- Length: 8:57
- Label: Geffen; Uzi Suicide
- Songwriter: Axl Rose
- Producers: Mike Clink; Guns N' Roses

Guns N' Roses singles chronology
"Live and Let Die" (1991)	"November Rain" (1992)	"Knockin' on Heaven's Door" (1992)

Music videos
- "November Rain" on YouTube
- "November Rain" (2022) on YouTube

"November Rain" is a song by American hard rock band Guns N' Roses. Written by the band's lead vocalist Axl Rose, the power ballad was released in February 1992, by Geffen Records, as the third single from the band's third studio album, Use Your Illusion I (1991). The song peaked at number one on the US Cash Box Top 100 and number three on the Billboard Hot 100, and at almost nine minutes long it was the longest song to enter the top ten of the chart at the time of its release. As of 2019, it was the fourth longest song to enter the Hot 100 chart. Additionally, "November Rain" reached number two on the Portuguese Singles Chart, number four on the UK Singles Chart, and the top 10 on several other music charts around the world. The accompanying music video was directed by Andy Morahan.

== Background ==
Slash states in his autobiography that the band recorded in 1986 an 18-minute version of "November Rain" at a session with guitarist Manny Charlton (of rock band Nazareth) the year prior to beginning sessions for Appetite for Destruction.

According to a story Axl Rose reported during the 2006 leg of the Chinese Democracy Tour, no other band members wanted to participate in the production of this song (or the other notable ballad "Estranged"). Slash and Duff McKagan were opposed to the band's drift to symphonic ballads, feeling their choice of more direct rock songs were being overlooked by Rose. Eventually, Rose persuaded the others during work at Can-Am Studios (where some of the album was recorded and mixed). Slash disputed Axl's claims of harsh musical differences in his autobiography released the next year.

Slash reported that his guitar solo in the song's album version developed directly from an improvisation.

== Writing and composition ==
"November Rain" is the third-longest song by Guns N' Roses, behind "Coma" (10:14) from the same album, and "Estranged" (9:24) from Use Your Illusion II. It was the longest song ever to reach the top 10 of the Billboard Hot 100 until November 2021, when surpassed by Taylor Swift's extended rerecording of "All Too Well". The song's composition was influenced by Elton John's 1973 opus "Funeral for a Friend/Love Lies Bleeding".

Its distinct symphonic overtone owes to a sweeping string arrangement, orchestrated by Rose. "We call it 'the Layla song'," joked Slash, referencing a similarly constructed rock song with a long, instrumental second part. It was later preceded by the coda from "Layla" on the Not in This Lifetime... Tour.

On November 4, 2022, the track was re-released with newly recorded orchestration on a re-issue of the Use Your Illusion album. A 50-piece orchestra conducted and arranged by Christopher Lennertz played the parts that had been sampled audio in the original mix. The track was mixed by Steven Wilson.

== Critical reception ==
Robert Hilburn from Los Angeles Times wrote, "This sweeping ballad – reminiscent of Elton John and Bernie Taupin’s most majestic work – underscores the ambition and range of the best and most volatile American hard-rock group in a decade." Dave Jennings from Melody Maker said, "There's probably no other band who can match the Gunners' ability to sound frighteningly real and then laughably crass in rapid succession. [...] On "November Rain", they fit both extremes into one nine-minute epic ballad." Another editor, Simon Reynolds, declared it as "a lush, swoony, mock-orchestral epic mid-way between Trevor Horn, Jim Steinman and 'Purple Rain'." Parry Gettelman from Orlando Sentinel viewed it as "a schlocky, over-produced ballad". Richard Harrington from The Washington Post felt that in the wake of their breakthrough power ballad "Sweet Child o' Mine", Guns N'Roses "have wisely chosen to play to their female constituency" with "November Rain". He explained that the song "finds Axl in an Elton John mood with a piano, synthesized strings and the realization that while 'It's hard to hold a candle/ in the cold November rain,' we should 'never mind the darkness/ we can still find a way/ cause nothin' lasts forever/ even cold November rain.' On the other hand, at almost nine minutes, this song comes close."

== Chart performance ==
In the United States, the song peaked at number three for two weeks in 1992, making it Guns N' Roses' sixth and last top-10 hit. It stayed in the top 10 for 10 weeks and on the Hot 100 for 30 weeks. The song also peaked at number nine in Germany and remained on the chart for 51 weeks. In Australia, "November Rain" was ranked at number two on the 1992 end-of-year chart despite only reaching number five on the ARIA Singles Chart. It was included on ARIA's year-end charts in two consecutive years (1992 and 1993, when it appeared at 36). A similar situation took place in New Zealand, where the song peaked at number seven but stayed in the top 20 for 24 non-consecutive weeks, ending 1992 as New Zealand's second-best-selling single.

== Music video ==
Composite image of the wedding dress from the "November Rain" music video worn by Stephanie Seymour

The music video for "November Rain", directed by British director Andy Morahan, was inspired by Del James's short story "Without You", for which he is credited in the long version of the video. The short story portrays a rock star struggling to come to terms with the loss of his girlfriend, who died by suicide (gunshot) after he repeatedly strayed from their relationship. November Rain is one of the most expensive music videos ever made.

The video tells a story reminiscent of "Without You", and features a live performance footage from Los Angeles' Orpheum Theater. First, in a silhouette, Rose's character is seen going to bed and taking pills; a bottle of whisky is also visible next to him. The scene, now in color, changes to the wedding of the main characters, played by Rose and his then-girlfriend Stephanie Seymour. The other band members are among the many guests.

Slash's character realizes he forgot the wedding rings, when McKagan's character offers his rings as a substitute. After the wedding couple leaves the church, we see the wedding reception that is later interrupted by sudden, heavy rain, causing everyone to run for shelter.

The next scene shows a funeral at the same church. Rose's character grieves at the death of his wife, now inside a casket with a mirrored object obscuring half of her face. A heavy rain falls upon the cemetery when the casket is laid to rest.

A final scene shows Seymour's character back at the wedding, tossing her white bouquet, which turns red in the air and lands on her coffin. Black and white scenes of Rose's character's nightmares show a mix of wedding and funeral scenes. The music video ends with Rose's character kneeling beside her grave and the bouquet turns back to white as the rain washes the red color away.

For the outside shots of Slash's first guitar solo, Rose had originally envisioned it taking place in a "cool field". Because the video was shot in winter, however, there were no good-looking fields around, and the band decided to film in New Mexico, where they had a church building transported specifically for the shoot. The larger church, for the wedding scenes, is Los Angeles' St. Brendan Catholic Church.

The music videos for "November Rain", "Don't Cry" and "Estranged" form an unofficial trilogy of sorts. While never specifically confirmed by the band, Del James' short story "Without You" served as inspiration for the video, and received recognition in the video's end credits.

In July 2018, the music video became the first video created prior to YouTube to surpass one billion views. In February 2023, the music video reached another milestone after it surpassed two billion views and remaining the oldest song (from the early 1990s) to achieve that feat.

The video was re-released in November 2022, with the newly synced orchestration, to promote the Use Your Illusion (Super Deluxe Edition) box set.

== Live performances ==
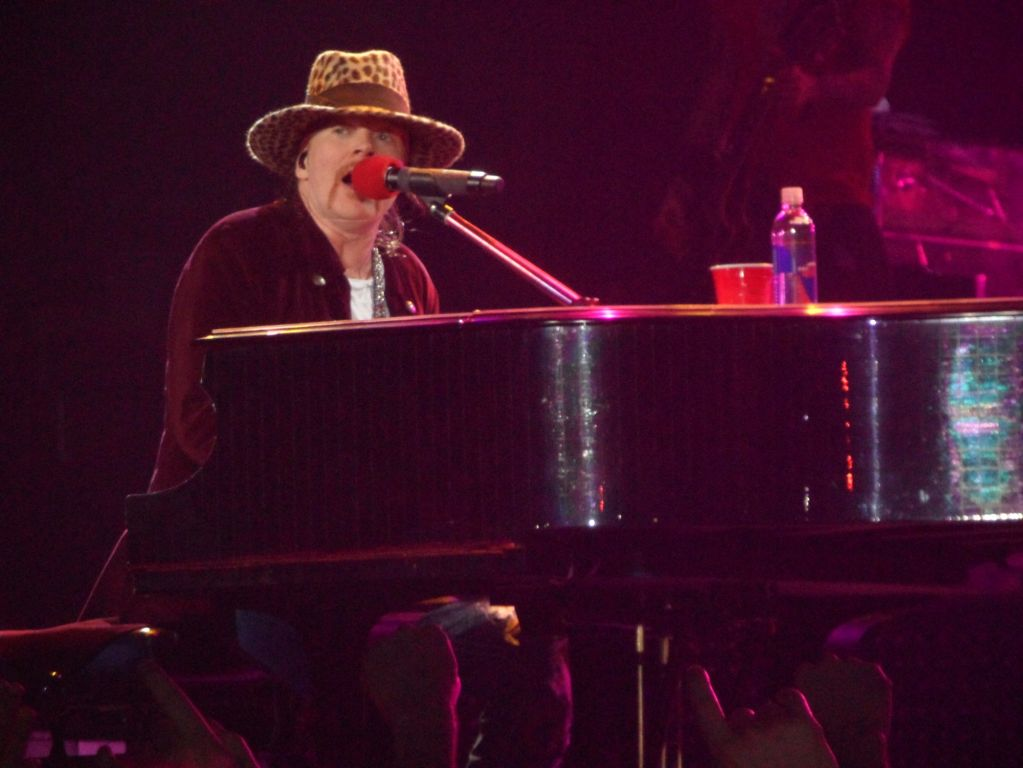
Axl Rose performing "November Rain" at Nottingham Arena, Nottingham, UK, in May 2012

The band performed a nearly nine-minute live version of the song with British musician Elton John on piano at the end of the 1992 VMAs ceremony. On January 22, 2023, Rose performed a shortened, solo version of "November Rain" during the memorial service of Lisa Marie Presley in Graceland.

== Retrospective response ==
"November Rain" was voted number one on the Rock 1000 2006, an annual countdown of the top 1,000 rock songs by New Zealand radio listeners. It was voted number two on the 2007 version, beaten by "Back in Black" by AC/DC. The song topped the "album tracks" section of a 1993 readers' poll in GN'R fanzine Controversy, beating "Coma". The top ten was completed by "Estranged", "Civil War", "Paradise City", "Sweet Child o' Mine", "Don't Cry", "Welcome to the Jungle", "Patience" and "Mr. Brownstone".

The song placed number 140 on Pitchfork's "Top 200 Tracks of the 90s". In Chile, the song placed at number 73 on Chilean radio Rock & Pop. In 2017, Paste ranked the song number nine on their list of the 15 greatest Guns N' Roses songs, and in 2020, Kerrang ranked the song number six on their list of the 20 greatest Guns N' Roses songs.

NPR described the song as "one of the ultimate hard-rock power ballads", while VH1 added that the song "is the sprawling, cosmic-reaching, just-so-insane-it-works hard rock epic toward which every previous single-track hard rock epic had led and from which every subsequent single-track hard rock epic has emerged". Glide Magazine named the song at second in their list of "Favorite Hair-Metal Power Ballads".

== Track listings ==
CD maxi
No.	Title	Writer(s)	Length
1.	"November Rain"	Axl Rose	8:57
2.	"Sweet Child o' Mine"	Rose, Izzy Stradlin, Slash, Duff McKagan, Steven Adler	5:55
3.	"Patience"	Stradlin	5:53

Cassingle
No.	Title	Writer(s)	Length
1.	"November Rain"	Rose	8:57
2.	"Sweet Child o' Mine"	Rose, Stradlin, Slash, McKagan, Adler	5:55

7-inch maxi
No.	Title	Writer(s)	Length
1.	"November Rain"	Rose	8:57
2.	"Sweet Child o' Mine"	Rose, Stradlin, Slash, McKagan, Adler	5:55

12-inch maxi
No.	Title	Writer(s)	Length
1.	"November Rain"	Rose	8:57
2.	"Sweet Child o' Mine"	Rose, Stradlin, Slash, McKagan, Adler	5:55
3.	"Patience"	Stradlin	5:53

== Personnel ==
Guns N' Roses

- W. Axl Rose – lead and backing vocals, piano, string synthesizer, choir
- Slash – lead guitar, backing vocals, choir
- Izzy Stradlin – rhythm guitar, backing vocals, choir
- Duff McKagan – bass guitar, backing vocals, choir
- Matt Sorum – drums, backing vocals, choir
- Dizzy Reed – backing vocals, choir

Additional musicians

- Stuart Bailey – backing vocals, choir
- Shannon Hoon – backing vocals, choir
- Johann Langlie – synthesizer programming
- Reba Shaw – backing vocals, choir

== Charts ==
=== Weekly charts ===
Chart (1992–1993)	Peak position
Australia (ARIA)	5
Austria (Ö3 Austria Top 40)	27
Belgium (Ultratop 50 Flanders)	18
Canada Top Singles (RPM)	5
Europe (Eurochart Hot 100)	11
Finland (Suomen virallinen lista)	7
France (SNEP)	18
Germany (GfK)	9
Ireland (IRMA)	3
Italy (Musica e dischi)	26
Netherlands (Dutch Top 40)	4
Netherlands (Single Top 100)	3
New Zealand (Recorded Music NZ)	7
Norway (VG-lista)	7
Portugal (AFP)	2
Spain (AFYVE)	19
Sweden (Sverigetopplistan)	38
Switzerland (Schweizer Hitparade)	8
UK Singles (Official Charts)	4
UK Airplay (Music Week)	36
US Billboard Hot 100	3
US Mainstream Rock Airplay (Billboard)	15
US Pop Airplay (Billboard)	19
US Cash Box Top 100	1

Chart (2023)	Peak position
Hungary (Single Top 40)	38

Chart (2026)	Peak position
Global Excl. US (Billboard)	200

=== Year-end charts ===
Chart (1992)	Position
Australia (ARIA)	2
Brazil (Crowley)	22
Canada Top Singles (RPM)	56
Europe (Eurochart Hot 100)	53
Germany (Media Control)	13
Netherlands (Dutch Top 40)	13
Netherlands (Single Top 100)	12
New Zealand (RIANZ)	2
US Billboard Hot 100	17
US Cash Box Top 100	6

Chart (1993)	Position
Australia (ARIA)	36

== Certifications ==
Region	Certification	Certified units/sales
Australia (ARIA)	4× Platinum	280,000^{‡}
Brazil (Pro-Música Brasil)	Platinum	60,000^{‡}
Denmark (IFPI Danmark)	Platinum	90,000^{‡}
Germany (BVMI)	Gold	250,000^{^}
Italy (FIMI)	Platinum	50,000^{‡}
Netherlands (NVPI)	Gold	50,000^{^}
New Zealand (RMNZ)	4× Platinum	120,000^{‡}
United Kingdom (BPI)	2× Platinum	1,200,000^{‡}
United States (RIAA)	Gold	500,000^{^}
^{^} Shipments figures based on certification alone.^{‡} Sales+streaming figures based on certification alone.

== Release history ==
Region	Date	Format(s)	Label(s)	Ref(s).
United Kingdom	February 24, 1992	7-inch vinyl; 12-inch vinyl; CD; cassette	Geffen; Uzi Suicide	
Australia	March 9, 1992	7-inch vinyl; 12-inch vinyl; CD; cassette	Geffen; Uzi Suicide	
Japan	April 21, 1992	Mini-CD	Geffen	
United States	June 2, 1992	7-inch vinyl; cassette	Geffen; Uzi Suicide	
