= Used to Love Her =

Song by Guns N' Roses

from the album G N' R Lies
- Released: November 29, 1988
- Recorded: 1988
- Genre: Roots rock
- Length: 3:13
- Label: Geffen
- Songwriter: Guns N' Roses
- Producers: Guns N' Roses, Mike Clink

"Used to Love Her" is a song by American rock band Guns N' Roses from the 1988 album G N' R Lies. The song was used as a B-side on some releases of the "Paradise City" single.

== Background ==
Contrary to popular belief that the song is about a girlfriend of Axl Rose, the song was written as a joke. Izzy Stradlin stated, "I was sitting around listening to the radio and some guy was whining about a broad who was treating him bad. I wanted to take the radio and smash it against the wall. Such self-pity! What a wimp! So we rewrote the same song we heard with a better ending." Rose would later say that the song that inspired Stradlin was from the band Great White.

== Live performances ==
The band debuted the song live at CBGB in October 1987, during the Appetite for Destruction Tour. The song has been a live staple at Guns N' Roses concerts. After last being played with the previous lineup in 1993, the song re-debuted in 2006 during the Chinese Democracy Tour. It was played at every tour since, being played by the reunited lineup in 2016 during the Not In This Lifetime... Tour stop at Coachella.

== Reception ==
Stephen Thomas Erlewine of AllMusic described the song as a "country-fried boogie", but criticized it as misogynistic. Rolling Stone described it as a "hilarious countryish number that will probably have feminist hot lines jammed across the country".

In 2016, Spin ranked the song 42nd out of 79 on their rankings of every Guns N' Roses song, saying "strip away the misogynist, dark, and twisted fantasy, though, and you’ve got a terrific, rootsy little mimic of an Allman Brothers’ on-the-road jam." That same year, Medium ranked the song 20th out of 80, stating "The crowning achievement of the 'remember this was written in 1988 [1987]; that doesn’t make it right, but still' manifesto that encompasses so much of Guns' oeuvre." L.A. Weekly ranked the song 18th of 64, and Ultimate Classic Rock ranked it 28th out of 80.

In 2018, Loudwire ranked the song 83rd out of 87, stating "This song feels like their attempt at the Stones' "Dead Flowers"... The song was likely meant to be taken with a grain of salt, but that was tough to swallow given that Axl’s ex-wife Erin Everly accused him of domestic abuse." Houston Press named the song 5th on their list of "10 Worst Guns N' Roses Songs".

== Cover versions ==
White Lung covered the song as part of a SiriusXMU live session. In February 2018, Guns N' Roses rhythm guitarist Richard Fortus joined Blackberry Smoke on stage to cover the song. L7 released a cover of the song as the B-side to their 1992 single "Monster", changing the lyric and title to "Used to Love Him".
