= G N' R Lies =

Studio album by Guns N' Roses
- Released: November 29, 1988
- Recorded: 1986–1988
- Studios: Rumbo Studios; Take One Studio; Image Recording Studios
- Genres: Hard rock, heavy metal, acoustic rock
- Length: 33:33
- Label: Geffen
- Producers: Guns N' Roses; Mike Clink

Guns N' Roses chronology
Guns N' Roses (1988)	G N' R Lies (1988)	Use Your Illusion I and Use Your Illusion II (1991)

Singles from G N' R Lies
- 1. "Patience" Released: March 31, 1989

G N' R Lies (also known simply as Lies) is the second studio album by American hard rock band Guns N' Roses, released by Geffen Records on November 29, 1988. It is the band's shortest studio album, running at 33 and a half minutes. The album reached number two on the US Billboard 200, and according to the RIAA, has shipped over five million copies in the United States.

"Patience", the only single released from Lies, peaked at number four on the Billboard Hot 100 on June 3, 1989. This is the band's last full album to feature drummer Steven Adler following his departure in 1990, shortly after the single "Civil War" was recorded, and featured on Use Your Illusion II (1991), as well as their last album to be recorded as a five-piece band.

== Background and recording ==
=== Live ?!*@ Like a Suicide ===
The first four tracks consist of the previously released EP Live ?!*@ Like a Suicide. These four tracks were also included as bonus tracks on the 2018 reissue of Appetite for Destruction.

=== G N' R Lies ===
The last four songs were recorded with acoustic guitars. They were written and recorded in only a few studio sessions (with the exception of "You're Crazy", which appeared in an alternative version on Appetite for Destruction), which producer Mike Clink called "one of those magical rock and roll history moments".

In later interviews, Axl Rose stated that while he loved how the band sounded on the last four songs, he hated the sound of his voice. Rose recalled that his voice was husky and scratchy from the band's lengthy touring at the time, and if he could he would have re-recorded his vocal tracks in a separate session.

A significantly faster version of "You're Crazy" with electric guitars had previously been released on the band's debut album, Appetite for Destruction, and was now recorded as originally intended. "Used to Love Her" was written as a joke after Izzy Stradlin disliked a song he heard on the radio featuring "some guy whining about a broad who was treating him bad". Slash stated that "people think it's about one of our old girlfriends, but it's actually about Axl's dog."

Three of the four songs from the G N' R Lies EP are included on the 2018 remastered release of Appetite for Destruction, with the exception of the controversial "One in a Million".

== Artwork ==
The reworked cover art for the album with edited texts.

The cover is a parody of tabloid newspapers, as are the liner notes. The album's cover art underwent several minor modifications when the title was released on CD, though early pressings of the CD retain the original cover art. First, in the bottom left corner reading "LIES LIES LIES" originally read "Wife-beating has been around for 10,000 years." Secondly, instead of "Elephant gives birth to midget", the original headline reads, "Ladies, welcome to the dark ages." Many copies of the original LP release also contained an uncensored picture of a nude model on the inner LP sleeve.

== Controversy ==
The song "One in a Million" has caused controversy and raised accusations of racism, homophobia and nativism due to the lyrics, which include the slurs "nigger" and "faggot". Rose denied that he was a racist and defended his use of the word "nigger", saying that "it's a word to describe somebody that is basically a pain in your life, a problem. The word nigger doesn't necessarily mean black." He cited the rap group N.W.A and the John Lennon song "Woman Is the Nigger of the World" as other examples of musicians using the word. Several years later, Rose conceded that he had used the word as an insult towards black people who had tried to rob him, and because the word is a taboo. In response to the allegations of homophobia, Rose stated that he considered himself "pro-heterosexual" and blamed this attitude on "bad experiences" with gay men.

Although initially against the song, other members of the band have since defended the song, claiming it was misunderstood. Nevertheless, the song was not included in future compilation releases that otherwise included all the other tracks on Lies. (Note: Future pressings & digital releases of the album itself still contain the song in unmodified form.)

== Reception ==
Professional ratings
Review scores
Source	Rating
AllMusic	3.5/5 stars
Columbia Daily Tribune	0.5/4 stars
Encyclopedia of Popular Music	3/5 stars
Entertainment Weekly	B
Express-News	3/4 stars
The Great Rock Discography	8/10
Rolling Stone	4/5 stars
The Rolling Stone Album Guide	3/5 stars
The Village Voice	E

Rolling Stone, in a four out of five star review, stated "Given that Guns N' Roses could probably release an album of Baptist hymns at this point and go platinum, it would be all too easy to dismiss G n' R Lies as a sneaky attempt by the band to throw together some outtakes and cash in on the busy holiday buying season ... The good news is that Lies is a lot more interesting than that ... The calm folk-rock melodies of these four acoustic songs reveal yet another welcome facet of Guns N' Roses. They should also end any further mutterings from the doubting Thomases out there who are still making snide comments about the band's potential for longevity." AllMusic, in a three and half out of five star review, criticized some of the songs on the acoustic side, stating "Constructed as a double EP, with the 'indie' debut Live ?!*@ Like a Suicide coming first and four new acoustic-based songs following on the second side, G N' R Lies is where the band metamorphosed from genuine threat to joke. Neither recorded live nor released by an indie label, Live ?!*@ Like a Suicide is competent bar band boogie, without the energy or danger of Appetite for Destruction. The new songs are considerably more problematic. 'Patience' is Guns N' Roses at their prettiest and their sappiest, the most direct song they recorded to date. Its emotional directness makes the misogyny of 'Used to Love Her (But I Had to Kill Her)' and the pitiful slanders of 'One in a Million' sound genuine."

In a negative review for The Village Voice, Robert Christgau stated "Axl's voice is a power tool with attachments, Slash's guitar a hype, the groove potent 'hard rock, and the songwriting not without its virtues. So figure musical quality at around C plus and take the grade as a call to boycott, a reminder to clean livers who yearn for the wild side that the necessary link between sex-and-drugs and rock-and-roll is a Hollywood fantasy", while condemning "One In a Million" and "Used To Love Her".

In a 2014 review, Metal Hammer dissected the controversy around the album, stating "Conceived as a stop-gap release, the second Guns N' Roses album remains a remarkable one-off – in every sense. Ultimate Classic Rock stated "Ironically, G N' R Lies' tabloid-style cover art also hinted at the incessant scandals and resulting paranoia that would soon engulf the band, and its singer in particular, sowing the seeds to their eventual dissolution after the twin Use Your Illusion behemoths, and protracted creative silence until 2008's historically delayed Chinese Democracy opus."

== Track listing ==
Songwriting credits via ASCAP.

1986 (Live ?!*@ Like a Suicide: Faux-live songs)
No.	Title	Writer(s)	Length
1.	"Reckless Life"	Axl Rose; Izzy Stradlin; Chris Weber	3:23
2.	"Nice Boys" (Rose Tattoo cover)	Angry Anderson; Mick Cocks; Geordie Leach; Dallas "Digger" Royall; Peter Wells	3:01
3.	"Move to the City"	Stradlin; Weber; Daniel Nicolson (a/k/a D.J.)	3:42
4.	"Mama Kin" (Aerosmith cover)	Steven Tyler	3:57

1988 (Acoustic songs)
No.	Title	Writer(s)	Length
5.	"Patience"	Guns N' Roses	5:56
6.	"Used to Love Her"	Guns N' Roses	3:13
7.	"You're Crazy"	Guns N' Roses	4:10
8.	"One in a Million"	Guns N' Roses	6:09
Total length:			33:29

== Personnel ==
Guns N' Roses

- W. Axl Rose − lead vocals, piano, whistling
- Slash − lead guitar, acoustic guitar, slide guitar
- Izzy Stradlin − rhythm guitar, acoustic guitar, backing vocals
- Duff "Rose" McKagan − bass, acoustic guitar, backing vocals
- Steven Adler − drums, percussion except track 5

Additional musicians

- West Arkeen − additional guitar, backing vocals on tracks 5–8
- Howard Teman − percussion on tracks 5–8

== Charts ==
=== Weekly charts ===
Weekly chart performance for G N' R Lies
Chart (1988–1991)	Peak position
Australian Albums (ARIA)	18
Austrian Albums (Ö3 Austria)	10
Brazilian Albums (Nopem)	1
Dutch Albums (Album Top 100)	12
Finnish Albums (Suomen virallinen lista)	7
German Albums (Offizielle Top 100)	37
Japanese Albums (Oricon)	16
New Zealand Albums (RMNZ)	5
Norwegian Albums (VG-lista)	6
Swedish Albums (Sverigetopplistan)	7
Swiss Albums (Schweizer Hitparade)	15
UK Albums (Official Charts)	22
US Billboard 200	2

== Certifications ==
Region	Certification	Certified units/sales
Argentina (CAPIF)	Platinum	60,000^{^}
Australia (ARIA)	Platinum	70,000^{^}
Austria (IFPI Austria)	Gold	25,000^{*}
Brazil (Pro-Música Brasil)	Gold	100,000^{*}
Germany (BVMI)	Gold	250,000^{^}
Japan (RIAJ)	Gold	100,000^{^}
New Zealand (RMNZ)	Platinum	15,000^{^}
United Kingdom (BPI)	Gold	100,000^{^}
United States (RIAA)	5× Platinum	5,000,000^{^}
^{*} Sales figures based on certification alone.^{^} Shipments figures based on certification alone.

== Accolades ==
Publication	Country	Accolade	Rank
L.A. Weekly	US	Chuck Klosterman's Favorite Hair Metal Albums	4
