= The Garden (Guns N' Roses song) =

Song by Guns N' Roses featuring Alice Cooper

from the album Use Your Illusion I
- Released: 1993
- Genre: Art metal; blues-rock
- Length: 5:21
- Label: Geffen
- Songwriters: Axl Rose; West Arkeen; Del James
- Producers: Mike Clink; Guns N' Roses

Music video
- "The Garden" on YouTube

"The Garden" is a song by the rock band Guns N' Roses that was released in 1991. It appears on the album Use Your Illusion I and features alternating lead vocals between Axl Rose and Alice Cooper.

== Background ==
"The Garden" was written before Guns N' Roses released Appetite for Destruction in 1987 but was not included on that album. It was composed by Axl Rose, Del James, and West Arkeen.

The song marks the second collaboration between Alice Cooper and Guns N' Roses. The group had previously recorded a cover of Cooper's song "Under My Wheels" (on which Cooper and Rose shared vocal duties) for the soundtrack of the 1988 film The Decline of Western Civilization Part II: The Metal Years.

According to Slash, Rose's delivery while recording resembled Alice Cooper's, so the band decided to invite him as a guest. Cooper, who was also in Los Angeles at the time, got an invitation to the studio and was accepted as a guest after hearing the track, recording his part three times. Rose's friend Shannon Hoon, the lead singer of Blind Melon, is also featured.

== Music video ==
The song was never officially released as a single or sent to radio stations as a promo. However, the band filmed and released a promo video to music video networks in 1993. It appeared as the B-side to the single Estranged in 1994.

The clip depicts various band members in sections of New York City, specifically Times Square and Washington Square Park. It was released to promote the Use Your Illusion Tour. Due to various scenes in strip clubs, the video was not shown very much on MTV. It appears on the band's Welcome to the Videos.

== Personnel ==
Guns N' Roses

- W. Axl Rose – co-lead vocals, backing vocals
- Slash – lead guitar, rhythm guitar, acoustic guitar, slide guitar
- Duff McKagan – bass
- Matt Sorum – drums, percussion

Additional musicians

- Alice Cooper – co-lead vocals
- Shannon Hoon – backing vocals
- West Arkeen – acoustic guitar
