= Matthew McKagan =

Matt McKagan
- Born: April 8, 1961 (age 65); Seattle, Washington
- Occupation: Music Educator
- Known for: 2023 Music Educator Award Grammy nominee semi-finalist

Matt McKagan (born April 8, 1961) in Seattle, Washington, is a former music teacher at Lindero Canyon Middle School in Agoura Hills, California. He was nominated for the Recording Academy's 2023 music educator Grammy Award, and has received multiple awards recognizing his work in education.

He is an older brother of Guns N' Roses bassist Duff McKagan.

== National awards ==
On October 26, 2022, McKagan was named a semi-finalist for the Grammy's 2023 Music Educator Award.

McKagan previously won national music education awards including the Mr. Holland's Opus Award in 2017, given at Carnegie Hall to the most inspiring Music Educators in the nation, along with the Los Angeles Music Center's 1999 BRAVO Award, which honors innovation and creativity in arts education.

Under McKagan's direction, Lindero Jazz Band "A" or Combo (2018) won first place in the middle school division at Reno Jazz Festival during years: 2011, 2012, 2017, 2018.

== Performance career ==
McKagan performed as a hornist and recorded with his brother, Duff McKagan, on several Guns N' Roses albums including the "Live and Let Die" track on Use Your Illusion I.
