= Asphalt Ballet (album) =

Studio album by Asphalt Ballet
- Released: 1991
- Recorded: 1991
- Genre: Hard rock
- Length: 50:04
- Label: Virgin
- Producer: Greg Edward

Asphalt Ballet chronology
Asphalt Ballet (1991)	Pigs (1993)

Asphalt Ballet is the debut album by the American band Asphalt Ballet. The album was released in 1991 by Virgin Records. The song "Soul Survive" was a minor radio and MTV hit.

== Reception ==
Professional ratings
Review scores
Source	Rating
AllMusic	2/5 stars

The AllMusic review by Vincent Reffries stated: "Judging from this debut, Asphalt Ballet couldn't muster enough confidence or conviction to fill the leather boots of their bad-boy idols."

== Track listing ==
No.	Title	Writer(s)	Length
1.	"Hell's Kitchen"	Danny Clarke, Julius Ulrich	2:55
2.	"Soul Survive"	Clarke	4:22
3.	"Tuesday's Rain"	Ulrich	4:18
4.	"Unlucky Mr. Lucky"	Ulrich, Clarke, Mikki Kiner	3:47
5.	"End of My Rope"	Ulrich	4:03
6.	"Heaven Winds Blow"	Clarke	3:55
7.	"Blood on the Highway"	Ulrich, Gary Jeffries	4:00
8.	"Goodbye Yesterday"	Clarke, Ulrich	4:33
9.	"Wasted Time"	Ulrich, West Arkeen, Clarke	3:40
10.	"Taking a Walk"	Ulrich	4:03
11.	"Hangman Swing"	Clarke, Ulrich	3:42
12.	"Blue Movie"	Clarke, Ulrich, Jeffries	3:52
13.	"Do It All Over Again"	Clarke, Ulrich	2:19
Total length:			50:04

== Personnel ==
- Gary Jeffries - Vocals and harmonica
- Terry Phillips - Bass
- Julius Ulrich - Guitar
- Danny Clarke - Guitar
- Mikki Kiner - Drums

Additional personnel

- Charles Judge - Keyboards
- Greg Edward - Percussion, keyboards, vocals
- Debby Holiday - Vocals
- Jeff Daniel - Vocals
- Daniel O'Brien - Vocals
- Rick Palombi - Vocals
- Jimmy Z - Saxophone
- Dan Fornero - Trumpet
- Art Velasco - Trombone
