= The Outpatience =

American hard rock group

- Origin: California, U.S.
- Genre: Hard rock
- Years active: 1995–1997
- Label: Reality Entertainment
- Past members: Mike Shotton; West Arkeen; Joey Hunting; James Hunting; Abe Laboriel Jr. Gregg Buchwalter

The Outpatience was an American hard rock group formed in 1995 in California by the guitarist West Arkeen. Arkeen is best known for co-writing several Guns N' Roses songs. The band released one album, Anxious Disease, in 1996. Arkeen died on May 30, 1997 in Los Angeles as a result of a drug overdose, resulting in the breakup of the band.

== History ==
Following his success as a prominent rock songwriter, writing and co-writing several songs for Guns N' Roses, Brother Cane, Phantom Blue, Asphalt Ballet and Duff McKagan, Arkeen started his own project, The Outpatience, in 1995. The group's line-up was rounded up by vocalist Mike Shotton of Von Groove, guitarist Joey Hunting of Billy Joel, David Lee Roth and Dear Mr. President/Flesh & Blood, bassist James Hunting of Eddie Money and David Lee Roth, drummer Abe Laboriel Jr. of Paul McCartney and keyboardist Gregg Buchwalter. The band recorded its first album, Anxious Disease, which featured notable guests such as Guns N' Roses' members Axl Rose, Slash, Izzy Stradlin and Duff McKagan as well as guitarist Steve Stevens. It was produced by Noel Golden, whose credits include Slash's Snakepit, Neurotic Outsiders and the Beth Hart Band, and co-produced by Arkeen. The album was mixed by Duane Baron, whose credits include Ozzy Osbourne, Mötley Crüe and Poison. It was released in Japan in 1996 and was looking for labels in the States when, on May 30, 1997, Arkeen was found dead in his Los Angeles home. His management company said that he had been at home recovering from severe burns and that his death was the result of an "accidental opiate overdose". In 2004, Anxious Disease received a posthumous release in the US and Europe.

== Discography ==
- Anxious Disease (1996)

== Band members ==
- Mike Shotton – vocals
- West Arkeen – guitar
- Joey Hunting – guitar
- James Hunting – bass guitar
- Abe Laboriel Jr. – drums, percussion
- Gregg Buchwalter. – keyboards
