= Asphalt Ballet =

American rock band

- Origin: San Diego, California, U.S.
- Genres: Blues rock, hard rock, southern rock
- Years active: 1988–1994
- Label: Virgin Records
- Members: Danny Clarke; Julius J. Ulrich; Terry Phillips; Mikki Kiner
- Past members: Tommy Dean; Gary Jeffries
- Website: -

Asphalt Ballet is an American rock band formed in San Diego, California. Their style is rooted in blues rock and incorporates elements of hard rock and Southern rock.

The band's name was derived from descriptive terminology used to depict a motorcyclist, crashing and skidding along an asphalt concrete road at high speed. The band consists of vocalist Gary Jeffries, bassist Terry Phillips, drummer Mikki Kiner, and guitarists Danny Clarke and Julius J. Ulrich,

== History ==
Virgin Records signed the band and released their self-titled debut album in 1991. Asphalt Ballet was crowned champion of Headbangers Ball with the video for "Soul Survive" that remained unbeaten going head to head with Ozzy Osbourne, The Cult, and others over a two month period. Their singer Gary Jeffries left the band due to personal problems in 1992. Their second album, Pigs, was released in 1993, with Tommy Dean on lead vocals. The band toured with Great White throughout 1993 in support of Pigs.

All members are currently alive and well with talk of a possible 35 year reunion featuring all original members at Sturgis Motorcycle Rally in 2026. The self titled debut album had two songs on the Charlie Sheen movie Beyond the Law, and has always held close ties to the biker community.

The band had plans to release a live record that was recorded in 1991 at Dallas City Limits, that has the entire first album and covers from the Doors ("LA Woman") and Blackfoot ("Wishing Well"), and that captures the band at its best. Also recently discovered were 18 live concert videos from 1991-1993 that have never seen the light of day.

== Membership ==
- Gary Jeffries – vocals. harmonica
- Terry Phillips – bass, backing vocals
- Julius Ulrich – guitar, backing vocals
- Danny Clarke – guitar, backing vocals
- Mikki Kiner – drums, backing vocals
- Tommy Dean – vocals

== Discography ==
=== Studio albums ===
Release date	Title	Label
1991	Asphalt Ballet	Virgin
1993	Pigs	Virgin

=== EPs ===
Release date	Title	Label
1991	Blood on the Highway	Virgin

=== Singles ===
Release date	Title	Label
1991	"Soul Survive"	Virgin
1992	"Tuesday's Rain"	Virgin
1992	"Unlucky Mr. Lucky"	Virgin
