= Use Your Illusion I =

Studio album by Guns N' Roses
- Released: September 17, 1991
- Recorded: January 13, 1990 – November, 1990
- Studios: A&M (Hollywood); Record Plant (Los Angeles); Studio 56 (Los Angeles); Image Recording (Hollywood); Conway (Los Angeles); Metalworks (Mississauga, Ontario)
- Genres: Hard rock; heavy metal; glam metal; art rock
- Length: 76:09
- Label: Geffen
- Producers: Mike Clink; Guns N' Roses

Guns N' Roses chronology
G N' R Lies (1988)	Use Your Illusion I and Use Your Illusion II (1991)	Use Your Illusion World Tour I and Use Your Illusion World Tour II (1992)

Singles from Use Your Illusion I
- 1. "Don't Cry" Released: September 2, 1991; 2. "Live and Let Die" Released: December 9, 1991; 3. "November Rain" Released: February 24, 1992

Use Your Illusion I is the third studio album by American hard rock band Guns N' Roses, released by Geffen Records on September 17, 1991, the same day as its counterpart Use Your Illusion II. It was the band's first album with keyboardist Dizzy Reed, and drummer Matt Sorum, who replaced Steven Adler following Adler's departure in 1990, shortly after playing on "Civil War", which appears on Use Your Illusion II. The supporting tour for the albums, the Use Your Illusion Tour, began in May 1991, four months before the release of the albums due to delays in getting the albums out.

The album debuted at No. 2 on the Billboard 200, selling 685,000 copies in its first week, behind Use Your Illusion II's first-week sales of 770,000. Use Your Illusion I has sold 5,502,000 units in the United States as of 2010, according to Nielsen SoundScan. Each of the Use Your Illusion albums have been certified 7× Platinum by the Recording Industry Association of America (RIAA). The album was nominated for a Grammy Award for Best Hard Rock Performance in 1992, and its single "Live and Let Die" was nominated in the same category the next year.

== Background ==
The Use Your Illusion albums represent a turning point in the sound of Guns N' Roses. Although the band did not abandon the aggressive sound it had become known for with 1987's Appetite for Destruction, Use Your Illusion I demonstrated a more diverse, "hard/art-rock" sound, incorporating elements of blues, classical music, heavy metal, punk rock, and classic rock and roll. This is exemplified by the use of piano on several tracks by singer Axl Rose and keyboardist Dizzy Reed, as well as on Use Your Illusion II. Use Your Illusion I contains two of the three songs, "November Rain" and "Don't Cry", whose videos are considered a trilogy. The third song, "Estranged", is on Use Your Illusion II.

Another factor in the different sound compared to the band's earlier work is the addition of former The Cult drummer Matt Sorum, who replaced Steven Adler. Adler was fired from the group due to extreme heroin addiction.

A number of songs on the album were written in the band's early days and can be found on a popular bootleg album of early demo tapes known as The Rumbo Tapes. "Back Off Bitch", "Bad Obsession", "Don't Cry" (referred to by Rose during the ensuing tour as 'the first song we ever wrote together'), "November Rain" and "The Garden" are considered part of this group. There is also a cover of Paul McCartney and Wings' "Live and Let Die".

Besides the stylistic differences, another new aspect in Use Your Illusion I was longer songs. "November Rain", an epic ballad, is nearly nine minutes long, and "Coma" is more than 10 minutes. Another change was the presence of tracks sung by other members of the band (even though certain songs from Appetite for Destruction and G N' R Lies featured other members on duet vocals): lead vocals on "Dust N' Bones", "You Ain't the First" and "Double Talkin' Jive" are performed by rhythm guitarist Izzy Stradlin. In addition, "14 Years" and "So Fine" from Use Your Illusion II were sung by Izzy Stradlin and Duff McKagan, respectively.

The band had some difficulty achieving the final sound, especially during the mixing stages of both albums. According to a 1991 Rolling Stone cover story, after mixing 21 tracks with engineer/producer Bob Clearmountain, the band decided to scrap the mixes and start from scratch with engineer Bill Price of Sex Pistols fame. "If Axl liked the mix, Slash didn't", Price recalled, "and if Slash liked it, Axl didn't... They still hadn't finished the record when their massive 18-month world tour started, so the last half-dozen songs were recorded in random studios across America on days off between gigs."

Slash has stated that a great deal of the material for the album was written on acoustic guitars in a couple of nights at his house (the Walnut House), after several months of non-productivity.

== Songs ==
"Right Next Door to Hell" was written after a dispute between Axl and his West Hollywood neighbor, Gabriella Kantor. Kantor accused Rose of hitting her with "a very good bottle of Chardonnay", so he was arrested and briefly held in jail. The charges were dismissed due to lack of evidence. Timo Caltia (real name Timo Kaltio), who participated in the writing of this song, is a Finnish guitarist, songwriter and guitar tech who once worked with Hanoi Rocks. He'd played a chorus riff of the song at his home while Stradlin was visiting.

"Live and Let Die" was released as the second single from the Use Your Illusion I album and the third out of all the Use Your Illusion singles. A music video was made in November 1991 featuring the band playing live on stage and showing old pictures. The video was also made shortly before Stradlin's departure and it was the last video where he appears. It charted at number 20 on the Mainstream rock chart. The song was nominated for Best Hard Rock Performance during the 1993 Grammy Awards.

"Don't Cry" is a power ballad and two versions were released simultaneously on different albums. The version with the original lyrics is featured on Use Your Illusion I, while the version with alternate lyrics is the 13th track on Use Your Illusion II. Only the vocal tracks differ, and even then only in the verses. There is also a third version, officially released only on the single for the song, which was recorded during the Appetite for Destruction sessions in 1986. Rose has stated that the song was written about a girl named Monique Lewis (the face tattooed on his right biceps). She was romantically involved with both Rose and Stradlin at different times.

"Bad Obsession" is about tackling drug abuse and addiction, which had haunted the band since before they had become famous. Michael Monroe, lead singer of the Finnish hard rock band Hanoi Rocks and a big influence on Guns N' Roses, plays the harmonica and tenor saxophone on the studio version. A live version from the Tokyo Dome was featured on the Use Your Illusion I DVD as song number six and Rose takes a dig at Stradlin by saying "This a song that we wrote about one year before "Mr. Brownstone" with the help of our friend West Arkeen and some guy that just, I don't know, his name just escapes me", referencing Stradlin.

"Back Off Bitch" was written during the early 1980s by Rose and his childhood friend and future Guns N' Roses bandmate Paul Tobias. The song was later played during Guns N' Roses concerts before the release of Appetite for Destruction. "Back Off Bitch" was written partially about Rose's girlfriend, Gina Siler, who moved with him to Los Angeles in 1982, and eventually kicked him out in 1983, due to his anger issues. It was also demoed several times by the band during this period.

At the end of "Double Talkin' Jive" Slash performs an extended flamenco-style guitar solo. Live performances of this song were stretched from its original three-minute length to more than eight minutes long. The opening line of the song "Found a head and an arm in a garbage can" refers to body parts that were actually discovered by the police in a dumpster in the vicinity of the studio. It is rumored that the body parts found were of porn actor/director/writer Billy London aka William Arnold Newton.

"November Rain" is an epic ballad written by lead singer Axl Rose and released as a single in June 1992. It features a sweeping orchestral backing and is one of Guns N' Roses' longest songs. It was the longest song in history to enter the top 10 of the U.S. Billboard Hot 100, until it was surpassed by "All Too Well" by Taylor Swift, which reached number one in 2021. Guns N' Roses performed this song with Elton John on piano at the 1992 MTV Video Music Awards.

"Garden of Eden" was written while the band was rehearsing for an extended period of time in Chicago. There is a music video of the song, filmed in one static take (shot through a fish eye lens) which features a close-up of Rose singing into a ribbon microphone with the band playing behind him, whilst keyboardists Dizzy Reed and Teddy Andreadis (who played the harmonica for the band during the Use Your Illusion Tour) are seen dancing in the far background. There are two versions of the video, both made in 1992. One version has strips of paper flying through the air, and is mostly found on music video sites like Yahoo! Music. The other version has lyrics onscreen, complete with a "follow-the-bouncing-ball", but with no paper flying around. This is the version that is on the Guns N' Roses music video compilation Welcome to the Videos.

"Dead Horse" starts with an acoustic section, which features a guitar riff written by Rose. The electric guitars soon come in for the heavier section which dominates the song. After the final climactic chorus, the opening section is reprised before ending with an audio effect of the song being fast-forwarded. A music video was also made for this song.

"Coma" was written by Rose and Slash about their drug overdoses. It is Guns N' Roses longest song to date. It features hospital sound effects and a real defibrillator.

== Artwork ==
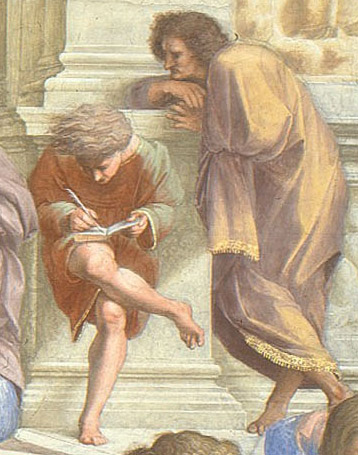
Raphael, The School of Athens (detail)

Both albums' covers are the work of Estonian-American artist Mark Kostabi. They consist of detail from Raphael's painting The School of Athens. The highlighted figure, unlike many of those in the painting, has not been identified with any specific philosopher. The only difference in the artwork between the albums is the color scheme used for each album. Use Your Illusion I uses yellow and red. The original painting was titled by Paul Kostabi as Use Your Illusion and also became the title of both albums. Both Use Your Illusion albums' liner notes include the message "Fuck You, St. Louis!" amongst the thank you notes, a reference to the Riverport Riot near there at the Hollywood Casino Amphitheatre in July 1991 during the Use Your Illusion Tour.

== Release and reception ==
Professional ratings
Review scores
Source	Rating
AllMusic	4.5/5 stars
Chicago Tribune	3/4 stars
Entertainment Weekly	A
Los Angeles Times	3.5/4 stars
NME	4/10
Pitchfork	8.4/10
Q	4/5 stars
Rolling Stone	4/5 stars
The Rolling Stone Album Guide	5/5 stars
USA Today	4/4 stars

Released at midnight on September 17, 1991, the Use Your Illusion albums were among the most anticipated in rock history. Predictions in the industry were of sales reaching the likes of Michael Jackson's Thriller and Bruce Springsteen's Born in the U.S.A., this despite the fact that major stores K-Mart and Walmart refused to stock the albums due to the profanity present. Estimates suggested that over 500,000 copies of the two albums were sold in just two hours. Both albums ultimately underperformed expectations domestically but were still commercially successful, with Use Your Illusion I selling 5,502,000 and both being certified 7× Platinum by the RIAA. Use Your Illusion I debuted below Use Your Illusion II mainly due to the fact that the second album contained the main lead single of the two albums "You Could Be Mine". It was the first time that two albums by one band or artist had entered the US charts at the number one and two spots and Guns N' Roses became the first to have the top two biggest selling albums on the chart since Jim Croce in 1974. The albums also opened as the top two albums on the charts in Australia, Japan, New Zealand and the United Kingdom.

Reception to Use Your Illusion I was mainly positive, and it is regarded as the heavier-sounding album of the two due in part to the influence of Izzy Stradlin. Critics praised the highlights of the album such as "November Rain" and "Coma", the closing track, but criticized the amount of filler on the album. David Fricke of Rolling Stone called Use Your Illusion I "so physically assaultive, verbally incendiary and at times downright screwy that it's hard to believe there's a sister disc out there just like it". While he expressed reservations about its inflammatory lyrics, Fricke found the album strong on "riffs, hooks and body-slam sonics" and commended Guns N' Roses' "anything-worth-doing-is-worth-overdoing spirit". USA Today's Edna Gundersen said that it "barely betters" Use Your Illusion II; the Chicago Tribune's Greg Kot preferred II, but still considered I "consistently involving". Robert Christgau gave the album a "one-star honorable mention" and named "Don't Damn Me" its best track. However, NME reviewer Mary Anne Hobbs felt that the Use Your Illusion albums contained only five strong songs, with "Double Talkin' Jive" being the sole highlight from I.

Retrospectively, AllMusic critic Stephen Thomas Erlewine opined that Use Your Illusion I suffers from filler and "overblown" production but deemed it a stronger work than Use Your Illusion II, highlighting "November Rain" and "Coma" as "ambitious set pieces ... which find Rose fulfilling his ambitions". In the 2004 Rolling Stone Album Guide, Ann Powers deemed I "the more propulsive" of the two albums, with the "grandiosity" exemplified by "November Rain" being counterbalanced by Stradlin's contributions as well as other songs in the vein of "vintage G n' R" such as "Back Off Bitch". Rolling Stone ranked both Use Your Illusion records jointly at number 41 on its 2010 list of the best albums of the 1990s.

== Track listing ==
No.	Title	Writer(s)	Length
1.	"Right Next Door to Hell"	Axl Rose; Izzy Stradlin; Timo Kaltio	3:02
2.	"Dust N' Bones"	Slash; Stradlin; Duff McKagan	4:58
3.	"Live and Let Die" (Paul McCartney and Wings cover)	Paul McCartney; Linda McCartney	3:04
4.	"Don't Cry" (original)	Rose; Stradlin	4:44
5.	"Perfect Crime"	Rose; Slash; Stradlin	2:23
6.	"You Ain't the First"	Stradlin	2:36
7.	"Bad Obsession"	Stradlin; West Arkeen	5:28
8.	"Back Off Bitch"	Rose; Paul Tobias	5:03
9.	"Double Talkin' Jive"	Stradlin	3:23
10.	"November Rain"	Rose	8:57
11.	"The Garden" (featuring Alice Cooper)	Rose; Arkeen; Del James	5:22
12.	"Garden of Eden"	Rose; Slash	2:41
13.	"Don't Damn Me"	Rose; Slash; Dave Lank	5:18
14.	"Bad Apples"	Rose; Slash; Stradlin; McKagan	4:28
15.	"Dead Horse"	Rose	4:17
16.	"Coma"	Rose; Slash	10:13
Total length:			76:09

2022 deluxe edition bonus CD
No.	Title	Writer(s)	Length
1.	"Perfect Crime" (live in London)	Rose; Slash; Stradlin	2:48
2.	"Bad Obsession" (live in Las Vegas)	Stradlin; Arkeen	6:36
3.	"Right Next Door to Hell" (live in New York)		3:01
4.	"Always on the Run" (live in Paris; featuring Lenny Kravitz)	Kravitz; Slash	4:47
5.	"Dust N' Bones" (live in London)	Slash; Stradlin; McKagan	5:10
6.	"Live and Let Die" (live in New York)	P. McCartney; L. McCartney	3:23
7.	"Attitude" (Misfits cover; live in Paris)	Glenn Danzig	1:52
8.	"Double Talkin' Jive" (live in London)	Stradlin	5:32
9.	"Don't Cry" (live in New York)	Rose; Stradlin	4:24
10.	"You Ain't the First" (live in New York)	Stradlin	3:23
11.	"It's Alright / November Rain" (Black Sabbath cover; live in Paris)	Geezer Butler; Tony Iommi; Ozzy Osbourne; Bill Ward; ("It's Alright"); Rose ("November Rain")	14:48
12.	"Bad Apples" (live in Rio de Janeiro)	Rose; Slash; Stradlin; McKagan	4:20
13.	"Wild Horses" (The Rolling Stones cover; live in Paris)	Jagger–Richards	3:17
Total length:			61:41

2022 bonus CD tracks for Japan
No.	Title	Writer(s)	Length
14.	"Live and Let Die" (live in Tokyo)	P. McCartney; L. McCartney	3:30
15.	"Don't Cry" (live in Tokyo)	Rose; Stradlin	4:39
Total length:			68:50

== Personnel ==
Guns N' Roses

- W. Axl Rose – lead vocals, piano, choir, synthesizer, programming, backing vocals, acoustic guitar, sound effects on "Garden Of Eden"
- Slash – lead guitar, rhythm guitar, slide guitar, acoustic guitar, Dobro, classical guitar, talkbox, six-string bass, backing vocals
- Izzy Stradlin – rhythm guitar, backing vocals, choir, acoustic guitar, lead guitar, lead vocals on "Dust N' Bones", "You Ain't the First" and "Double Talkin' Jive", percussion on "Bad Obsession"
- Duff McKagan – bass, backing vocals, acoustic guitar on "You Ain't the First", choir
- Matt Sorum – drums, percussion, backing vocals, choir
- Dizzy Reed – keyboard, percussion, backing vocals

Additional musicians

- Shannon Hoon – backing vocals on "Live and Let Die", "November Rain", "You Ain't the First", and "The Garden"; co-lead vocals on "Don't Cry"
- Johann Langlie – programming on "Live and Let Die", "November Rain" and "Garden of Eden"; sound effects on "Coma"
- Michael Monroe – harmonica and saxophone on "Bad Obsession"
- Reba Shaw – backing vocals on "November Rain"
- Stuart Bailey – backing vocals on "November Rain"
- Jon Thautwein – horn on "Live and Let Die"
- Matthew McKagan – horn on "Live and Let Die"
- Rachel West – horn on "Live and Let Die"
- Robert Clark – horn on "Live and Let Die"
- Tim Doyle – tambourine on "You Ain't the First"
- Alice Cooper – co-lead vocals on "The Garden"
- West Arkeen – acoustic guitar on "The Garden"
- Bruce Foster – sound effects on "Coma"

Production and design

- Mike Clink – production, engineering, nutcracker on "Dead Horse"
- Jim Mitchell – additional engineering
- Bill Price – mixing
- George Marino – mastering
- Kevin Reagan – art direction, graphic design
- Mark Kostabi – album artwork
- Robert John – photography
- Allen Abrahamson – assistant engineer
- Buzz Burrowes – assistant engineer
- Chris Puram – assistant engineer
- Craig Portelis – assistant engineer
- Ed Goodreau – assistant engineer
- Jason Roberts – assistant engineer
- John Aguto – assistant engineer
- L. Stu Young – assistant engineer
- Leon Granados – assistant engineer
- Mike Douglass – assistant engineer
- Talley Sherwood – assistant engineer

== Charts ==
=== Weekly charts ===
Weekly chart performance for Use Your Illusion I
Chart (1991–2022)	Peak position
Argentine Albums (CAPIF)	2
Australian Albums (ARIA)	2
Austrian Albums (Ö3 Austria)	2
Belgian Albums (SABAM/IFPI)	4
Danish Albums (IFPI)	6
Dutch Albums (Album Top 100)	2
European Albums ("Billboard")	2
Finnish Albums (The Official Finnish Charts)	3
French Albums (SNEP)	13
German Albums (Offizielle Top 100)	4
Greek Albums (IFPI Greece)	6
Hungarian Albums (MAHASZ)	6
Irish Albums (IRMA)	1
Italian Albums (Musica e dischi)	3
Japanese Hot Albums (Billboard Japan)	14
New Zealand Albums (RMNZ)	2
Norwegian Albums (VG-lista)	3
Polish Albums (ZPAV)	31
Portuguese Albums (AFP)	28
Scottish Albums (Official Charts)	20
Spanish Albums (AFYVE)	4
Swedish Albums (Sverigetopplistan)	3
Swiss Albums (Schweizer Hitparade)	3
UK Albums (Official Charts)	2
UK Album Downloads (Official Charts)	29
UK Rock & Metal Albums (Official Charts)	1
US Billboard 200	2
US Indie Store Album Sales (Billboard)	9
US Top Hard Rock Albums (Billboard)	10

=== Year-end charts ===
Year-end chart performance for Use Your Illusion I
Chart (1991)	Position
Australian Albums (ARIA)	32
Austrian Albums (Ö3 Austria)	34
Dutch Albums (Album Top 100)	14
European (European Top 100 Albums)	38
German Albums (Offizielle Top 100)	63
New Zealand Albums (RMNZ)	29

Chart (1992)	Position
Australian Albums (ARIA)	22
Austrian Albums (Ö3 Austria)	14
Dutch Albums (Album Top 100) Use Your Illusion I + II	3
Europe (European Top 100 Albums)	11
German Albums (Offizielle Top 100)	9
New Zealand Albums (RMNZ)	21
Swiss Albums (Schweizer Hitparade)	37
US Billboard 200	17

Chart (1993)	Position
Dutch Albums (Album Top 100)	67
German Albums (Offizielle Top 100)	40

Chart (2002)	Position
Canadian Metal Albums (Nielsen SoundScan)	91

=== Decade-end charts ===
Decade-end chart performance for Use Your Illusion I
Chart (1990–99)	Position
US Billboard 200	71

== Certifications ==
Region	Certification	Certified units/sales
Argentina (CAPIF)	5× Platinum	300,000^{^}
Australia (ARIA)	4× Platinum	280,000^{^}
Austria (IFPI Austria)	2× Platinum	100,000^{*}
Belgium (BRMA)	2× Platinum	100,000^{*}
Brazil (Pro-Música Brasil) Deluxe Edition	Diamond	160,000^{‡}
Brazil (Pro-Música Brasil) CD	Platinum	250,000^{*}
Brazil (Pro-Música Brasil)	Gold	100,000^{‡}
Canada (Music Canada)	Diamond	1,000,000^{^}
Denmark (IFPI Danmark)	2× Platinum	40,000^{‡}
Finland (Musiikkituottajat)	Platinum	67,662
France (SNEP)	Platinum	300,000^{*}
Germany (BVMI)	2× Platinum	1,000,000^{^}
Italy (FIMI) sales since 2009	Platinum	50,000^{‡}
Japan (RIAJ)	2× Platinum	400,000^{^}
Mexico (AMPROFON) video	Gold	10,000^{^}
Mexico (AMPROFON)	Platinum+Gold	350,000
Netherlands (NVPI)	2× Platinum	200,000^{^}
New Zealand (RMNZ)	Platinum	15,000^{^}
Norway (IFPI Norway)	2× Platinum	100,000^{*}
Poland (ZPAV) 2022 reedition	Gold	10,000^{‡}
Spain (Promusicae)	Platinum	100,000^{^}
Sweden (GLF)	Platinum	100,000^{^}
Switzerland (IFPI Switzerland)	2× Platinum	100,000^{^}
United Kingdom (BPI)	Platinum	398,834
United States (RIAA)	7× Platinum	7,000,000^{^}
^{*} Sales figures based on certification alone.^{^} Shipments figures based on certification alone.^{‡} Sales+streaming figures based on certification alone.

== See also ==
- List of glam metal albums and songs
