= Del James =

American musician

- Born: Adalberto James Miranda; February 5, 1964 (age 62)
- Years active: 1985–present
- Labels: Geffen Records; UZI Suicide

Adalberto James Miranda (born February 5, 1964), known professionally as Del James, is an American musician, writer, journalist and artist best known for writing "The Language of Fear". James also wrote the short story Without You that inspired the music video for "November Rain", a song by the hard rock band Guns N' Roses who credit this inspiration at the beginning of the music video. He is a close friend to Axl Rose and is the road manager for Guns N' Roses.

== Biography ==
Del James was raised in Mamaroneck, New York.

He moved to Hollywood, California, in 1985. During his first weekend in Hollywood, Del met West Arkeen and the members of an unsigned group called Guns N' Roses. Del still works with Axl Rose and the current lineup of Guns N' Roses, serving as road manager.

== Journalist and writer ==
As a journalist, he was a Senior Editor for RIP, a heavy metal magazine and his work has appeared in many publications including Rolling Stone. Nominated for a "Maggy Award", Del has interviewed Keith Richards, Alice Cooper, Ronnie Wood, Kiss, The Cult, Guns N' Roses, and countless others.

Del also released a collection of short horror stories entitled The Language of Fear in 1995 on Dell/Abyss Books and reissued a decade later. The collection features an introduction by Axl Rose and the short story "Without You", said to be the inspiration for the Guns N' Roses video "November Rain".

=== Without You ===
Del's short story Without You is credited by hard rock band Guns N' Roses as the inspiration for the song November Rain and its music video.

Most of the plot is told in the form of flashbacks. Mayne Mann, aged 28, is a top-selling rock musician. But the suicide of his girlfriend Elizabeth has left him depressive and questioning the meaning behind everything.

Although Elizabeth had been the love of Mayne's life, his frequent infidelity had brought about the end of their relationship. The last straw was when after Mayne's final concert with his previous band, Elizabeth had walked in on a threesome between him and two groupies. In the aftermath, during one of their last dates, Elizabeth had told him, "I can't live with you and I can't live without you." Her words had inspired him to write the ballad Without You, which portrays his view on their breakup and has become a top hit. When his new band went on tour and performed in Elizabeth's hometown L.A., he had sent her backstage passes. When she did not show up, Mayne had been determined not to repeat his past mistake, had skipped the after party and gone straight to her home. As Mayne was on his way up to her apartment, Elizabeth had shot herself in the head, with Without You playing on an endless loop in the background. In a rush, Mayne had taken the revolver from her dead hand and tried to shoot himself, but there had been no more bullets left.

Life in the fast lane has taken his toll on Mayne: he has hearing issues, is a heavy drinker and drug consumer and, presumably as a result of his girlfriend's suicide, on various kinds of medication. He avoids things that bring back memories of Elizabeth, such as the mansion in which they had spent most of their time, or radio stations that might play Without You.

The story begins as Mayne, after a night of heavy drinking and drug consumption, awakes from a recurring nightmare in which he relives Elizabeth's suicide. Still hung over from the previous night, he starts the day with a beer and eventually spends the whole morning with alcohol, drugs and memories of Elizabeth. In a fit of rage he begins to smash the furniture in his apartment and even most of his collection of vintage guitars, suddenly seeing them as the gateway to his fame and his misery. He briefly considers shooting himself but then changes his mind and starts to play, first on his favorite and last remaining guitar, then on the piano. In the meantime, a burning cigarette which has fallen off the edge of a table has set the apartment on fire. Yet Mayne ignores it and continues to play until he dies in the flames.

== Work in the music industry ==
Del has directed music videos for bands like Guns N' Roses and Soul. He has co-written songs with groups such as Testament, ("So Many Lies", "Return to Serenity", "The Ritual", "Dog Faced Gods", "Eyes of Wrath", "3 Days in Darkness", "Careful What You Wish For", "Sewn Shut Eyes", and "Dark Roots of Earth"), TNT, Ricky Warwick, Stan Lynch, Rhett Forrester, Dizzy Reed, The Almighty and Guns N' Roses, including "The Garden" and "Yesterdays", from the band's Grammy-nominated Use Your Illusion I and Use Your Illusion II albums. Del James is credited as the project coordinator for Live Era '87–'93, the Guns N' Roses live album.

== Work in the television industry ==
Del James worked for the Ultimate Fighting Championship (Severn v Coleman, UFC 12, on February 7, 1997) as a writer for the live event. The event was supposed to take place in Buffalo, New York, but was moved to Dothan, Alabama, less than 48 hours before the event started.
