= Coma (Guns N' Roses song) =

Song by Guns N' Roses

from the album Use Your Illusion I
- Released: September 17, 1991
- Recorded: 1990–1991
- Studio: A&M Studios; Record Plant Studios; Studio 56; Image Recording; Conway Studios; Metalworks Recording Studios
- Genre: Progressive metal
- Length: 10:15
- Label: Geffen
- Songwriters: Axl Rose; Slash
- Producers: Mike Clink; Guns N' Roses

"Coma" is a song by American hard rock band Guns N' Roses. It is the final song on their album Use Your Illusion I. At 10 minutes and 14 seconds, it is the longest track released by the band, and has no choruses.

== Composition ==
Slash states that he wrote the music to this song in a house he and Izzy Stradlin rented in Hollywood Hills, following the Appetite for Destruction tours. In a 2011 interview, he stated he wrote the song in a "heroin delirium".

In an interview, Axl Rose talks about writing "Coma":

I tried to write that song for a year, and couldn't. I went to write it at the studio and passed out. I woke up two hours later and sat down and wrote the whole end of the song, like, just off the top of my head. It was like, don't even know what's coming out, man, but it's coming. I think one of the best things that I've ever written was maybe the end segment of the song "Coma". It just poured out.

In an interview, on August 31, 1990, with MTV's Kurt Loder on Famous Last Words, Axl talks about the song "Coma":

There's a song called Coma that's like 11 minutes 45 seconds long with no chorus. And I think there was only one verse that somewhere it repeats itself. It's Slash's baby. It's his monster. The song used to be called Girth.

But I started writing about when I OD'ed 4 years ago. The reason I OD'd was because of stress. I couldn't take it. And I just grabbed the bottle of pills in an argument and just gulped them down and I ended up in the hospital. But I liked that I wasn't in the fight anymore and I was fully conscious that I was leaving. I liked that. But then I go, all of a sudden, my first real thoughts were that "okay, you haven't toured enough. The record's not going to last; it's going to be forgotten. This and that, you have work to do. Get out of this." And I went "No!" and I woke up, you know, and pulled myself out of it.

But in the describing of that, some people could take it wrong and think this means "go put yourself into a coma," you know. And so it's really tricky, and I'm still playing with the words to figure out how to, like, show some hope in there.

== Reception ==
Coma was ranked the 19th best Guns N' Roses song by Kerrang!.

== Live performances ==
From 1991-1993 the song was performed only four times. A rare live version was featured on Japanese and vinyl copies of the Guns N' Roses live album Live Era: '87-'93. On April 8, 2016, the song was performed for the first time in almost twenty three years (last performed April 10, 1993) and became a setlist regular during the Not in This Lifetime... Tour.

== Personnel ==
Guns N' Roses

- W. Axl Rose – lead vocals, production
- Slash – lead guitar, production
- Izzy Stradlin – rhythm guitar, production
- Duff McKagan – bass, production
- Matt Sorum – drums, production

Additional personnel

- Johann Langlie, Bruce Foster – sound effects
- Diane Mitchell, Michelle Loiselle, Monica Zierhut-Soto, Patricia Fuenzalida, Rose Mann, Susanne Filkins – spoken word female vocals
