= West Arkeen =

American musician (1960–1997)

Background information
- Also known as: West Arkeen
- Born: Aaron West Arkeen; June 18, 1960; Neuilly-sur-Seine, France
- Origin: San Diego, California, U.S.
- Died: May 30, 1997 (aged 36) Los Angeles, California, U.S.
- Genres: Rock; hard rock; blues rock
- Occupations: Musician; songwriter; record producer
- Instruments: Guitar; vocals; percussion
- Years active: 1978–1997
- Label: Reality Entertainment
- Formerly of: Guns N' Roses; The Outpatience; Drunkfuxs; Duff McKagan; Brother Cane; Phantom Blue; Asphalt Ballet; Back Alley Sally; Femme Fatale

Aaron West Arkeen (June 18, 1960 – May 30, 1997) was an American musician best known for co-writing several Guns N' Roses songs.

== Early life ==
Aaron West Arkeen was born in Neuilly-sur-Seine, France. He was the son of Morris Arkeen, a retired U. S. Army Master Sergeant. He initially lived in Texas, until his parents divorced, moving to San Diego, California, with his father and older brother, Abe.

Arkeen suffered from craniosynostosis, a birth defect in which the skull grows irregularly, often constricting brain growth. The condition required surgery, from which he fully recovered, but left an ear-to-ear scar over the crown of Arkeen's head.

According to his brother, Arkeen's mother abandoned him after the surgery and was a non-factor in his life, contributing to his later substance abuse. According to his nephew, Arkeen and his mother reconnected later in his life and had a loving relationship.

Arkeen began playing guitar when he was 14 years old. He took a single guitar lesson and was a self-taught musician. He cited Elton John, John Lennon, Jimi Hendrix, Earth, Wind, and Fire, and Ted Nugent as musical influences from his youth.

Arkeen worked briefly in the oil industry in East Texas and as a slot machine repairman in Las Vegas. In 1986, he relocated to Los Angeles, where he worked as a house painter for a day job while pursuing a music career.

In an LA Weekly profile on Arkeen, Wendy Lou Gosse - his partner for nine years - described the couple "going to see bands at local clubs and bring friends back to jam and write, sometimes deep into the next day."

== Music career ==
Arkeen befriended a group of musicians in Los Angeles, who would soon rise to international fame as Guns N' Roses.

Arkeen lived in an apartment next to Guns N' Roses bassist Duff McKagan. He and McKagan formed a friendship and began writing songs together. Though he was never a member of the band, the group's vocalist Axl Rose considered adding him as a third guitarist, primarily for his prolific songwriting abilities.

Arkeen collaborated with Guns N' Roses members to co-write "It's So Easy," "Bad Obsession," "The Garden," "Sentimental Movie," and "Yesterdays." Guns N' Roses traditionally opens its live performances with "It's So Easy."

Arkeen also wrote "Make Your Play" and "Pressure" for Birmingham, Alabama band Brother Cane, as well as co-writing "My Misery" for Phantom Blue.

After working on other songs with the band for their double set Use Your Illusion I and II, Arkeen started his own project in 1995, The Outpatience. Featuring vocalist Mike Shotton, bassist James Hunting, guitarist Joey Hunting, drummer Abe Laboriel Jr. and keyboardist Gregg Buchwalter, the band released their debut album, Anxious Disease, in Japan in 1996. Axl Rose, Slash and Duff McKagan appear as guest artists and Izzy Stradlin co-wrote one of the songs.

Izzy Stradlin and Duff McKagan are most closely associated with Arkeen. The trio played in The Drunkfuxs' side project together, and Arkeen co-wrote two of the songs on McKagan's debut solo record, Believe in Me.

== Death ==
On May 30, 1997, Arkeen was found dead in his Los Angeles home from a drug overdose with heroin, morphine, and cocaine in his system.

== Legacy and influence ==
Duff McKagan credits Arkeen with teaching him about alternate tuning on guitar. Slash stated that Arkeen was "the only one that always came through when any of us needed anything. For a long time, he literally was the only one we could trust." Arkeen's bluesy style affected Guns N' Roses' songwriting style. The Guns N' Roses album Live Era: '87-'93 was dedicated, in part, to his memory.

== Discography ==
Year	Artist	Album	Title(s)
1987	Guns N' Roses	Appetite for Destruction	"It's So Easy"
1991	Guns N' Roses	Use Your Illusion I	"Bad Obsession", "The Garden"
1991	Guns N' Roses	Use Your Illusion II	"Yesterdays"
1991	Asphalt Ballet	Asphalt Ballet	"Wasted Time"
1993	Asphalt Ballet	Pigs	"Crash Diet"
1993	Brother Cane	Brother Cane	"Pressure", "Make Your Play"
1993	Duff McKagan	Believe in Me	"Man in the Meadow", "Swamp Song", "Fuck You"
1993	Phantom Blue	Built to Perform	"My Misery"
1996	The Outpatience	Anxious Disease	
2001	Adam Bomb	New York Times	"Anxiety"
2004	Wildside	The Wasted Years	"Crash Diet"
2015	The Seekers	A World Of Our Own	"The Seekers"
