= Blind Melon discography =

Blind Melon is an alternative rock band, whose most notable work dates from 1992 to 1995, and ceased with the death of lead vocalist Shannon Hoon. In 2006, the band reformed with a new lead vocalist, Travis Warren. From 1992 to 1996 the band released three studio albums. They have also released two compilations albums and one live album. They are best known for the 1993 song "No Rain" which reached number 1 on the United States Mainstream Rock chart and in Canada. Other songs that charted include "Tones of Home" (1992), "Change" (1993), and "Galaxie" (1995).

== Albums ==
=== Studio albums ===
Title	Details	Peak chart positions										Sales	Certifications
Title	Details	US	AUS	AUT	CAN	FIN	GER	NED	NZL	SWE	UK	Sales	Certifications
Blind Melon	Released: September 22, 1992; Label: Capitol	3	37	35	3	—	62	62	27	—	53	US: 2,500,000	RIAA: 4× Platinum; BPI: Silver; MC: 4× Platinum
Soup	Released: August 15, 1995; Label: Capitol	28	74	44	14	33	—	87	34	40	48	US: 217,000	MC: Gold
For My Friends	Released: April 22, 2008; Label: Rocket Science Ventures	133	—	—	—	—	—	—	—	—	—		
"—" denotes albums that did not chart.

=== Compilation albums ===
Title	Details	Peak chart positions	
Title	Details	US	CAN
Nico	Released: November 12, 1996; Label: Capitol	161	90
Classic Masters	Released: January 29, 2002; Label: Capitol	—	—
The Best of Blind Melon	Released: September 27, 2005; Label: Capitol	—	—
"—" denotes albums that did not chart.

=== Live album ===
Title	Details
Live at the Palace	Released: April 4, 2006; Label: Capitol

== Singles ==
Title	Year	Peak chart positions										Certifications	Album
Title	Year	US	US Main	US Alt	AUS	AUT	CAN	IRE	NED	NZL	UK	Certifications	Album
"Tones of Home"	1992	—	10	20	83	—	47	—	—	—	62		Blind Melon
"No Rain"	1993	20	1	1	8	29	1	24	22	15	17	ARIA: Gold; BPI: Silver	Blind Melon
"I Wonder"	1993	—	—	—	—	—	—	—	—	—	—		Blind Melon
"Change"	1993	—	—	—	133	—	41	—	—	—	35		Blind Melon
"Galaxie"	1995	— (Note: "Galaxie" did not enter the Billboard Hot 100, but peaked at number 54 on the Hot 100 Airplay (Radio Songs) chart.)	25	8	122	—	21	—	—	50	37		Soup
"Toes Across the Floor"	1995	—	—	—	—	—	—	—	—	—	—		Soup
"Three Is a Magic Number"	1996	—	—	—	—	—	—	—	—	—	—		Schoolhouse Rock! Rocks
"Soul One"	1996	—	—	—	—	—	—	—	—	—	—		Nico
"The Pusher"	1996	—	—	—	—	—	—	—	—	—	—		Nico
"Way Down and Far Below"	2019	—	—	—	—	—	—	—	—	—	—		
"Too Many to Count"	2019	—	—	—	—	—	—	—	—	—	—		
"Fence"	2020	—	—	—	—	—	—	—	—	—	—		
"In the Very Best Way"	2020	—	—	—	—	—	—	—	—	—	—		
"Strikes Back"	2021	—	—	—	—	—	—	—	—	—	—		
"Strikes Back Redux"	2021	—	—	—	—	—	—	—	—	—	—		
"No Rain (Super Duper Remix)"	2022	—	—	—	—	—	—	—	—	—	—		
"—" denotes the recording that did not chart.

== Compilation appearances ==
=== Tribute albums ===
- 1995: Encomium: A Tribute to Led Zeppelin – Out on the Tiles
- 1996: Schoolhouse Rock! Rocks – Three Is a Magic Number

=== Soundtrack albums ===
- 1994: The Cowboy Way - Music From The Motion Picture - ‘’Candy Says’’

== Music videos ==
Song	Year	Director
"Tones of Home"	1992	Samuel Bayer
"No Rain"	1992	Samuel Bayer
"I Wonder"	1992	Paul Boyd
"Dear Ol' Dad"	1992	Paul Boyd
"Change"	1993	Samuel Bayer
"Galaxie"	1995	Jake Scott
"Mouthful of Cavities"	1995	Unknown
"Toes Across the Floor"	1995	Jamie Thraves
"Soul One"	1996	Unknown
"Wishing Well"	2008	Danny Clinch

== Video albums ==
Title	Album details	Certifications
Letters from a Porcupine	Released (VHS): November 19, 1996; Released (DVD): September 11, 2001; Label: Capitol	
Live at the Metro: September 27, 1995	Released: September 27, 2005; Label: Capitol; Format: DVD	
