= Unified Theory (band) =

American band (1998–2001)

- Also known as: Luma
- Origin: Seattle, Washington, U.S.
- Genres: Alternative rock, post-grunge
- Years active: 1998–2001
- Label: 3.33
- Spinoff of: Blind Melon, Pearl Jam
- Past members: Chris Shinn; Christopher Thorn; Brad Smith; Dave Krusen

Unified Theory, previously Luma, were an American rock band from Seattle, Washington, formed in 1998. The lineup consisted of Chris Shinn (lead vocals, rhythm guitar), formerly of Celia Green, former Blind Melon members Christopher Thorn (lead guitar) and Brad Smith (bass) as well as Dave Krusen (drums) formerly of Pearl Jam.

Following the death of singer Shannon Hoon in 1995, former Blind Melon members Christopher Thorn and Brad Smith moved to Seattle and began working on a new project. This project was put on hold following Thorn's move to Los Angeles. However, after meeting former Celia Green singer Chris Shinn, they regrouped with Smith in Seattle and, with the addition of former Pearl Jam drummer Dave Krusen, formed Luma in 1998. The following year, they released a self-titled EP before renaming themselves Unified Theory, after Albert Einstein's unified field theory, releasing their self-titled debut album in 2000.

Unified Theory toured in support of their album and began recording their second album. However, in 2001, the band disbanded with Smith citing a "sudden lack of chemistry" for the breakup. Their second album, Cinematic, was eventually released in 2006.

== History ==
=== Early years and formation (1995–1999) ===
Guitarist Christopher Thorn and bassist Brad Smith were members of alternative rock band Blind Melon. The band released two studio albums, Blind Melon and Soup, before singer Shannon Hoon died of a drug overdose in 1995. Smith and Thorn moved to Seattle, Washington following Hoon's death, with the band taking extended break, releasing Nico, a rarities compilation album, in 1996. The same year, the remaining band members began discussing the possibility of continuing Blind Melon with a new vocalist, eventually deciding to continue under a different moniker and, unsuccessfully, auditioning a number of singers before going their separate ways.

While in Seattle, Smith and Thorn began a new project that was put on hold after Thorn moved to Los Angeles in early 1998. Smith began working on a solo album, while Thorn produced Amy Correia's album Carnival Love, recorded with Live, on their album The Distance to Here, and searched for a singer for their project. After listening to several singers, Thorn met vocalist Chris Shinn, during his time as touring guitarist with Live, after hearing an album by his previous band Celia Green. Shinn soon relocated to Seattle, due to his own house in North Carolina being burnt down, staying at Thorn's house while the guitarist was on tour with Live. Thorn and Shinn then regrouped with Smith and began recording material. It was during recording that Smith invited friend, and former Pearl Jam drummer, Dave Krusen to record with them, with Krusen eventually joining the lineup permanently, forming Luma in mid-1998. The following year, they released a four-song self-titled EP through their website, and toured the Pacific Northwest from July 29–August 18, the same year. By the end of the year, Luma changed their name to Unified Theory, named after Albert Einstein's final hypothesis unified field theory.

=== Unified Theory and break up (1999–2001) ===
When I was writing the lyrics for that song. I kept thinking of all the crazy stuff I went through when I first moved to California. The Song is about standing on your own two feet and giving your dreams a fair shake no matter how impossible they seem.

— Smith on the band's first single "California."

By 2000, Unified Theory signed with Universal Records subsidiary 3.33 Music Group while they relocated to Los Angeles and began recording their debut album. The album was recorded at Stank Face Laboratories and Lucky Dog Studios in Seattle, and was produced by both Thorn and Smith, and mixed by Andy Wallace. Jon Bolton and Matthew Steer contributed additional drums to the recording, while string arrangements were handled by Dave Dysart. In June, Unified Theory shot a music video for their first single "California" with director Bobby G, before touring the US in July.

The band's debut album entitled Unified Theory was released on August 15, 2000, through 3.33 Music Group in North America only. Unified Theory went on to sell over 16,000 albums by 2002. "California" and "Wither" were both released as singles. However, with the exception of Seattle, most major market radio stations avoided playing "California." Critically, the album received generally positive reviews. Reviewing for Allmusic, Greg Prato stated that "Unified Theory's self-titled debut shows that Shinn has brought a more modern rock sound to the proceedings, mixing Jeff Buckley and Radiohead with Smith and Thorn's retro rock stylings" and that the "12-track debut is a refreshing break from the norm." Lina Lecaro, of the Los Angeles Times, describes the album as "a little too much like its members' former projects." However, "there are a couple of unique gems in the derivative dust." The Stranger stated that the album "sounds like Jane's Addiction, but not as hard." Classic Rock stated that the band's "self-titled debut has to be one of the most exciting, spiritual albums of recent times" and that "their sound combines flashes of the off-the-wall genius that was Blind Melon's calling card, the odd reminder of the 90s Seattle scene and a whole host of fascinating influences."

In support of the album, Unified Theory performed a number of dates in August, and toured supporting Counting Crows, VAST and Live. In 2001, the band headlined their own North American tour from February 12–March 1, before performing at South by Southwest in March. The band began writing and recording material for their second album before announcing their breakup later in the year. Smith cited frustrations during the writing of their new album as the reason, stating "in the past eight months the band's focus became hazy at best" and despite efforts to keep the band together, it was time for them "to move on" and that "the decision to split was made about two weeks ago [and that their] minds were elsewhere way before that."

=== Post–breakup activities (2001–present) ===
Following the breakup of Unified Theory, Smith released his debut solo album, Mercy, under the alias Abandon Jalopy, in 2001. The album featured contributions from his former Blind Melon bandmates, including Thorn who also co-produced the album, with Smith touring in support of the album in 2002. Smith and Thorn would continue to co-produce a number of albums together, including the debut album of American singer-songwriter Anna Nalick entitled Wreck of the Day released on April 19, 2005, and American Minor's self-titled debut album released on August 16, the same year. In 2006, Thorn co-produced Cheyenne Kimball's debut album, The Day Has Come, which also featured additional drums by Krusen, released on July 11, while Smith and Thorn produced Under the Influence of Giants' self-titled album, released on August 8 the same year.

Shinn moved to Los Angeles, following the breakup, and began working on a new band with Krusen called Move As A Verb. Though they recorded one song, titled "Want and Need," Shinn and Krusen would part ways, with Shinn forming Everything is Energy with former She Wants Revenge guitarist Thomas Froggatt and former Ours drummer Kirke Jan in 2003. Both Froggatt and Jan would depart the band, with guitarist Noah Lebenzon, Shinn's former bandmate in Celia Green, bassist Joey Clement and drummer David Brotherton joining the band by 2006, with Everything is Energy releasing their self-titled album the following year.

Krusen would go on to form Novatone with guitarist Robert Lyons and former Green Apple Quick Step singer Tyler Willman, releasing their debut album entitled Time Can't Wait in 2005. The same year, he contributed drums to Thee Heavenly Music Association's debut album Shaping the Invisible, while in 2008, Krusen's former band Candlebox released first album in ten years entitled Into the Sun, which featured additional drums previously recorded by Krusen.

After befriending singer Travis Warren, who was interested in having Smith and Thorn produce his music, the trio, along with former Blind Melon members Rogers Stevens and Glen Graham, began working with Warren on new songs and announced the reformation of Blind Melon in 2006. They toured from October 8–22 in 2007, and released their first studio album, since Soup, entitled For My Friends on April 22, 2008. The band performed at the MusiCares MAP Fund benefit concert and announced plans to tour in support of their album. However, the tour was soon cancelled after Blind Melon parted ways with Warren. The band were to perform a number of shows with Thorn and Smith's former bandmate Shinn, though a lack of preparation time resulted in the band cancelling the tour.

Unified Theory released their second album, Cinematic, on iTunes in December 2006. The band did not reunite to perform any shows to promote the album.

Unified Theory reunited for one show on August 4, 2010 at the King King in Hollywood. Chris Shinn's other band Everything is Energy opened the show.

Chris Shinn joined the band Live in 2012 as their new lead singer, staying in that role until 2016.

== Musical style ==
Following the release of their debut album, College Music Journal writer Sandy Masuo described the release as a "nexus of musical styles that draws on everything from Led Zeppelin to Björk. Hard rock merges with power pop over a trippy undercurrent that flares up in tracks like "Passive."" Describing the songwriting process, Smith stated that each band member "puts their personality into the song even if it was almost completely written by one person" and that once a song goes through the band, it gives it the character of the band members. Comparisons were also made between vocalist Chris Shinn and Shannon Hoon, due to their similar vocal styles and lyrical content, though Allmusic writer Greg Prato believes Shinn has "brought a more modern rock sound to the proceedings."

== Band members ==
- Chris Shinn – lead vocals, rhythm guitar
- Christopher Thorn – lead guitar
- Brad Smith – bass
- Dave Krusen – drums

== Discography ==
Studio albums

- Unified Theory (15 August 2000), Universal
1. "Cessna" – 3:48
2. "California" – 3:07
3. "Instead Of Running" – 3:39
4. "Wither" – 3:56
5. "The Sun Will Come" – 3:26
6. "AM Radio" – 4:03
7. "Fin" – 4:33
8. "Self Medicate" – 4:26
9. "Passive" – 4:25
10. "Full Flavor" – 3:54
11. "Not Dead" – 4:01
12. "Keep On" – 4:58
- Cinematic (9 December 2006), Wishbone Recordings
1. "15 Hits" - 4:15
2. "We Don't Break" - 5:10
3. "Beneath the Underdog" - 4:01
4. "Can't Let Us Down" - 6:02
5. "All in One" - 3:12
6. "1st 50 Ft." - 3:39
7. "Perfect Qualities" - 4:04
8. "Oscar and Me" - 4:33
9. "Anna" - 4:18
10. "One Less" - 4:34

EPs

- Luma (1999)

=== Singles ===
Year	Song	Album
2000	"California"	Unified Theory
2000	"Wither"	Unified Theory

=== Music videos ===
Year	Title	Director
2000	"California"	Bobby G
