= Classic Masters (Blind Melon album) =

Compilation album by Blind Melon
- Released: January 29, 2002
- Recorded: 1992–1996
- Genre: Alternative rock; grunge; neo-psychedelia; psychedelic rock
- Length: 41:04
- Label: Capitol
- Producer: Cheryl Palewski

Blind Melon chronology
Nico (1996)	Classic Masters (2002)	The Best of Blind Melon (2005)

Professional ratings
Review scores
Source	Rating
Allmusic	4/5 stars

Classic Masters is a compilation album by Blind Melon. Classic Masters was released on January 29, 2002.

At the time of its release, Classic Masters drew some ire from the music press, most of whom quickly picked up on the differences between the Classic Masters versions and their complete album counterparts. For example, "Mouthful of Cavities" has the spoken "Listen, man. I got the window open [Do] you hear the cats, man? Listen." intro by frontman Shannon Hoon excised.

== Track listing ==
1. "Tones of Home" (from Blind Melon) – 4:27
2. "Galaxie" (single edit, from Soup) – 2:41
3. "Change" (from Blind Melon) – 3:42
4. "Paper Scratcher" (from Blind Melon) – 3:27
5. "Mouthful Of Cavities" (from Soup) – 3:22
6. "Walk" (from Soup) – 2:47
7. "No Rain" (from Blind Melon) – 3:38
8. "Toes Across The Floor" (from Soup) – 3:05
9. "Soup" (from Nico) – 3:11
10. "2 X 4" (from Soup) – 4:01
11. "Pull" (from Nico) – 3:27
12. "Soul One" (from Nico) – 3:14

== Personnel ==
- Herb Agner – Project Manager
- Michelle Azzopardi – Editorial Supervision
- Danny Clinch – Photography
- Frank Collura – A&R
- Glenn Graham – Drums
- Shannon Hoon – Guitar (Acoustic), Vocals
- Bryan Kelley – Producer
- Lee Lodyga – A&R
- Ron McMaster – Remastering
- Cheryl Pawelski – Producer, Compilation
- Brad Smith – Bass, Vocals (background)
- Terry Stevens – Guitar, Liner Notes
- Christopher Thorn – Guitar
- Peleg Top – Art Direction, Design
- Shaun Ward – Producer
