= The Best of Blind Melon =

Tones of Home: The Best of Blind Melon

Greatest hits album by Blind Melon
- Released: September 27, 2005
- Recorded: 1992–1995
- Genre: Alternative rock; grunge; neo-psychedelia; psychedelic rock
- Length: 75:32
- Label: Capitol

Blind Melon chronology
Classic Masters (2002)	Tones of Home: The Best of Blind Melon (2005)	Live At The Palace (2005)

Professional ratings
Review scores
Source	Rating
Allmusic	link

Tones Of Home: The Best of Blind Melon is a compilation album by Blind Melon released on September 27, 2005. It is the fifth Blind Melon album and the third album after the death of lead singer Shannon Hoon.

== Track listing ==
1. "Tones of Home" (4:28)
2. "Change" (3:42)
3. "Paper Scratcher" (3:15)
4. "No Rain" (3:38)
5. "I Wonder" (5:33)
6. "Time" (6:03)
7. "Galaxie" (2:52)
8. "Mouthful of Cavities" (Edit) (3:21)
9. "Walk" (2:47)
10. "Toes Across the Floor" (3:06)
11. "2 x 4" (4:01)
12. "St. Andrew's Fall" (4:15)
13. "Soup" (3:12)
14. "Pull" (3:28)
15. "Soul One" (3:16)
16. "No Rain" (Ripped Away Version) (2:25)
17. "Three Is a Magic Number" (3:15)
18. "Soak the Sin" (live) (5:31)
19. "Deserted" (live) (7:24)
