= Danny Clinch =

American photographer and film director

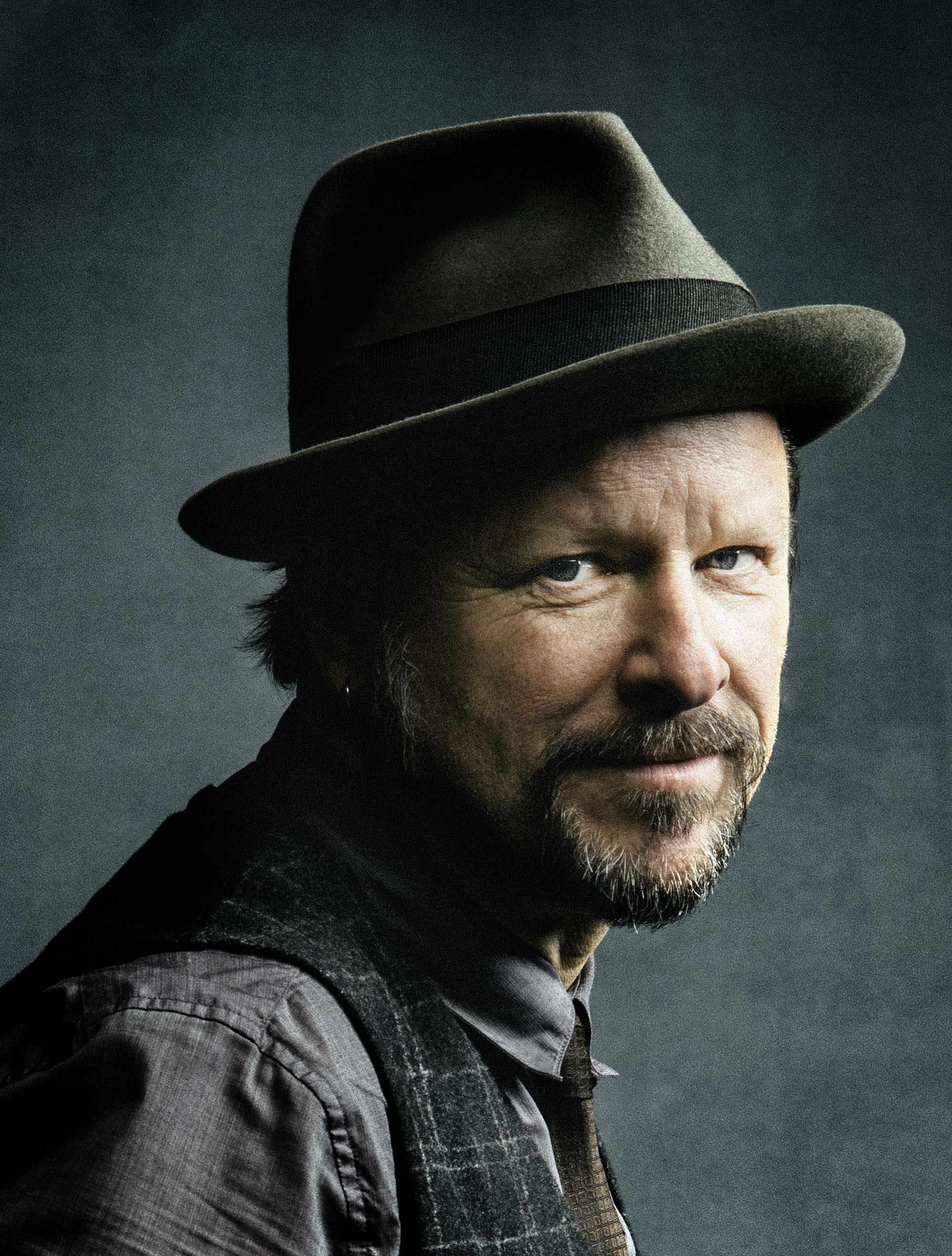
Danny Clinch

Danny Clinch (born 1964) is an American photographer and film director.

== Early life and education ==
Born in Toms River, New Jersey, Clinch graduated from Toms River High School East in 1982. After attending Ocean County College, he attended the New England School of Photography, a two-year institution located in Boston.

== Biography ==
Clinch began his career as an intern for Annie Leibovitz, and went on to photograph Bob Dylan, Johnny Cash, Bruce Springsteen, Tupac Shakur, The Smashing Pumpkins, Blind Melon, Dave Matthews Band, Phish, Nicole Atkins, and Björk.

His photographs have appeared in Vanity Fair, Spin, The New Yorker, The New York Times, and Rolling Stone. Clinch has published the books: Discovery Inn, When the Iron Bird Flies, Still Moving, and, his most recent, Motor Drive. In February 2016, he was featured on 60 Minutes.

Clinch directed a concert DVD documenting Pearl Jam's 2006 tour of Italy entitled Immagine in Cornice which was released in 2007. In 2013 he directed the video for the band's single Mind Your Manners. He also directed the DVD portion of Springsteen's Devils & Dust DVD box-set, and co-directed the 2019 film All I Can Say, which was composed of footage shot by late Blind Melon singer Shannon Hoon on his video camera.

He is one of the founders of the Sea.Hear.Now Festival.

== Publications ==
- Discovery Inn
- When the Iron Bird Flies
- Still Moving
- Motor Drive

== Filmography ==
- 270 Miles from Graceland: Live from Bonnaroo 2003 (2003)
- Ani DiFranco: Trust (2004)
- Guster on Ice: Live from Portland Maine (2004)
- Specimens of Beauty (2004)
- Foo Fighters: Skin and Bones (2006)
- Pearl Jam: Immagine in Cornice (2007)
- John Mayer: Where the Light is (2008)
- Dispatch: Zimbabwe (2008): Dispatch's most recent concert in the summer of 2007
- Between the Lines: Sara Bareilles Live at the Fillmore (2008)
- NY-Z – An Absolut Collaboration with Jay-Z (2010)
- I'm in I'm Out and I'm Gone: The Making of Get Up! (2013)
- Pearl Jam Lightning Bolt (2013)
- The Avett Brothers February Seven
- Chris Stapleton Dodge Ram (2016)
- Leon Bridges This Is Home (2016)
- Let's Play Two: Pearl Jam Live at Wrigley Field (2017)
- Brandi Carlile: The Joke (Official Video) from the album By the Way, I Forgive You (2018)
- Gov't Mule: Bring On the Music: Live at the Capitol Theatre (2019)
- All I Can Say (2019)
- My Morning Jacket Time Waited (2025)

== Group exhibitions ==
- 2018 Annenberg Space for Photography - "Contact High: A Visual History of Hip-Hop"
- 2024-2025 American Museum of Natural History - "Ice Cold. A Hip-Hop Jewelry History"
