= All I Can Say =

2019 documentary film about Blind Melon singer Shannon Hoon

- Theatrical release poster
- Directed by: Shannon Hoon; Danny Clinch; Taryn Gould; Colleen Hennessy
- Produced by: Lindha Narvaez; Taryn Gould; Samuel Gursky
- Starring: Shannon Hoon; Blind Melon
- Cinematography: Shannon Hoon
- Edited by: Taryn Gould
- Music by: Blind Melon
- Distributed by: Oscilloscope Laboratories
- Release dates: April 26, 2019 (Tribeca); June 26, 2020 (United States)
- Running time: 102 minutes
- Country: United States
- Language: English

All I Can Say is a 2019 documentary film about the life of Shannon Hoon, the lead singer of the band Blind Melon. It is composed almost entirely of Hi8 video footage that he recorded from 1990 up to the hours before his death in 1995, offering an autobiographical perspective on his final five years. He is credited as a director on the film, which was completed by Danny Clinch, Taryn Gould, and Colleen Hennessy after his death. The film documents Hoon's personal experiences, his family relationships, his creative process, the formation of Blind Melon and their rise to fame, and his struggles with substance abuse.

== Synopsis ==
The title All I Can Say is derived from the opening lyric of Blind Melon's breakthrough song "No Rain". The documentary presents Hoon's life largely in chronological order, utilizing footage he recorded on his Hi8 camcorder, often with on-screen date and time stamps. This footage includes the early days of Blind Melon's formation in Los Angeles in 1990, Hoon's experiences and collaborations with Guns N' Roses during the recording of their Use Your Illusion I and Use Your Illusion II albums, his interactions with family and bandmates, the band's rapid ascent to stardom following the success of "No Rain" and its iconic music video, and the period leading up to his death on October 21, 1995, while on tour for Blind Melon's second album, Soup. Intimate moments include Hoon documenting his girlfriend Lisa Sinha's pregnancy and the birth of their daughter, Nico Blue, alongside his observations of 1990s popular culture and current events as he experienced them.

== Production ==
All I Can Say was assembled from an archive of approximately 200 hours of personal video footage shot by Shannon Hoon on a Hi8 camcorder between 1990 and 1995. Hoon used his camera as a form of video diary to meticulously document his life, creative endeavors, and personal experiences. The project was co-directed by music photographer and filmmaker Danny Clinch, who had known Hoon and Blind Melon since their early days, alongside film editors Taryn Gould and Colleen Hennessy.

The directors curated Hoon's extensive footage, presenting it chronologically to allow him to tell his own story. The film intentionally avoids external commentary, voice-overs, or contemporary interviews with other subjects, relying solely on Hoon's own footage and voice. This approach has led to the film being described as a "found-footage documentary". Stephen Whitty for Screen Daily said, "In a way, the film is its own genre – the found-footage documentary. There are no interviews with other people, no self-described experts. Just Hoon, who – adding to the film's melancholy sense of waste – comes across as an unspoiled, charismatic and mostly amiable young man." It is considered Hoon's final completed work, realized over two decades after his death.

== Release ==
All I Can Say premiered at the Tribeca Film Festival on April 26, 2019. Oscilloscope Laboratories acquired the distribution rights. Due to the COVID-19 pandemic limiting traditional theatrical releases, the film was released in "virtual cinemas" and through partnerships with record stores and music venues beginning June 26, 2020.

Oscilloscope Laboratories released the DVD and Blu-ray on November 24, 2020. Bonus features include an interview with co-directors Danny Clinch, Taryn Gould, and Colleen Hennessy, moderated by Judd Apatow; deleted scenes; and the theatrical trailer.

== Reception ==
=== Critical response ===
On the review aggregator website Rotten Tomatoes, the film holds an approval rating of 81% based on 16 reviews, and an average rating of 6.7/10. Metacritic, which uses a weighted average, assigned the film a score of 61 out of 100, based on 11 critics, indicating "generally favorable reviews".

For Variety, Andrew Barker wrote, "At one point, Hoon is asked how he keeps from getting lost in the whirlwind of stardom that has taken over his life, and he replies that this is the very reason he’s always walking around with a video camera: capturing enough of the mayhem so that he can try to make sense of it later on, when things finally calm down. He never got that opportunity, but full credit to the makers of All I Can Say for giving the rest of us a chance".

For Rolling Stone, David Fear gave the film a 4 out of 5 star rating, and wrote, "These are just home movies, you think. Then, this music doc strings them together and makes you feel like they aren’t just home movies at all. It turns them into a firsthand portrait of fame, making someone’s dreams come true and then majorly fucking with their head".

For Alternative Nation, Greg Prato wrote, "Thanks to Clinch, Gould, and Hennessy, we now have a fascinating glimpse into the tragically short life of one of the most captivating rock singers/performers of the era (and beyond) – Shannon Hoon".

For BraveWords, Aaron Small gave it an 8 out of 10 rating, and wrote, "Impactful, intriguing, intimate, and honest, All I Can Say is an insider’s less than glamorous look at essentially immediate, and short-lived success".

For The Guardian, Phil Hoad described it as "a quizzical time capsule of pre-internet fame from the perspective of a troubled but capable young man who knew his way around a camera". For NME, Mark Beaumont suggested, "If we're to understand Hoon's life through his footage, it's as a victim of a lifestyle that amplifies not just the sounds in your head but the problems at your core". For The Irish Times, Tara Brady commended the directors for having "sifted through hundreds of hours of footage to fashion something that allows for a sense of the person behind the rock casualty".

=== Accolades ===
The film won the Grand Jury Prize at Sound Unseen, Best Documentary Feature at the New Hampshire Film Festival, and Best Feature Length Documentary at the Rincon International Film Festival. The film was included on Esquire magazine's list of "The Best Movies of 2020". The film was awarded Best International Musical Documentary at the 2020 In-Edit Festival in Spain.
