= List of number-one singles of 1993 (Canada) =

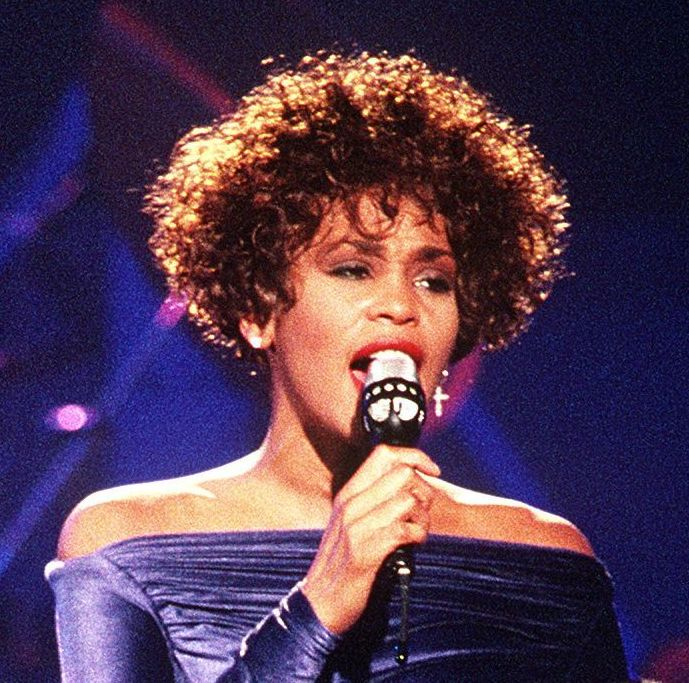
Whitney Houston's "I Will Always Love You" spent eight weeks at number one in 1993 to become the year's highest-selling single in Canada.

RPM was a Canadian magazine that published the best-performing singles of Canada from 1964 to 2000. Seventeen singles peaked atop the RPM Singles Chart in 1993. "I Will Always Love You" by Whitney Houston held the top position from 1992 into 1993, and Bryan Adams achieved the final number-one hit of the year with "Please Forgive Me". Six musical acts peaked at number one in Canada for the first time this year: Boy George, P.M. Dawn, Soul Asylum, Meat Loaf, Blind Melon, and Ace of Base. Whitney Houston was the only artist to peak at number one more than once.

The only Canadian to top the chart this year was Bryan Adams. Whitney Houston had the most successful single of the year with her cover of Dolly Parton's "I Will Always Love You", which topped the chart for eight weeks in January and February 1993. Together with "I Have Nothing", Houston totalled eleven weeks at the summit. Janet Jackson and Mariah Carey both spent six weeks at number one with "That's the Way Love Goes" and "Dreamlover", respectively, while Duran Duran topped the RPM Singles Chart for five weeks with "Ordinary World". The other acts that spent at least three weeks at number one were Sting, Tina Turner, Soul Asylum, and Bryan Adams.

Key
† Indicates best-performing single of 1993

== Chart history ==
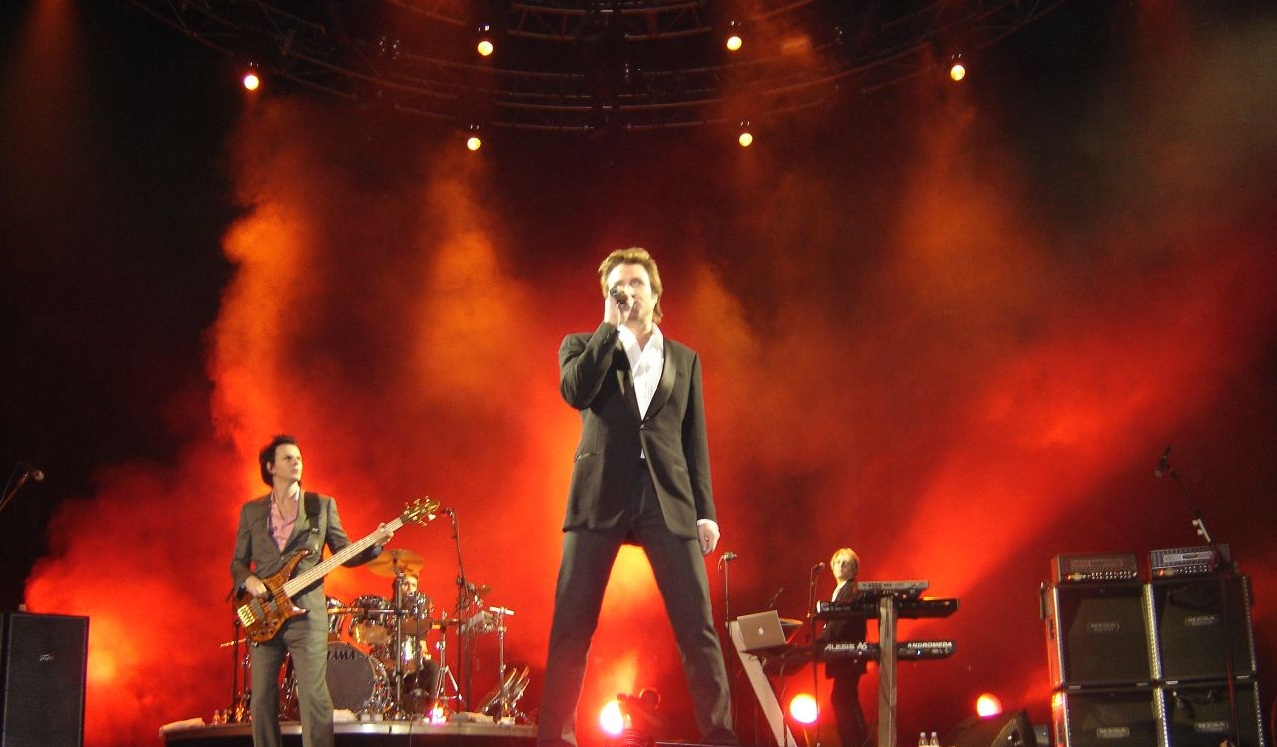
Duran Duran picked up their third Canadian number-one single with "Ordinary World", which remained five weeks at the top spot.

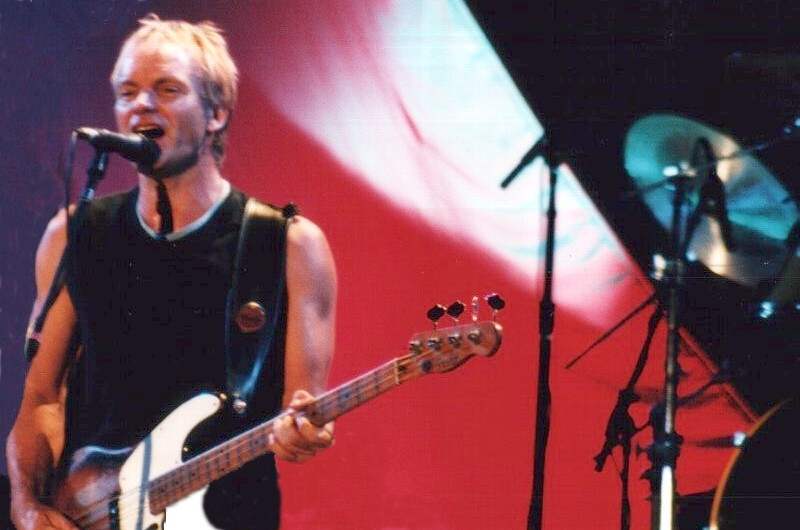
English musician Sting logged three weeks at number one in 1993 with "If I Ever Lose My Faith in You".

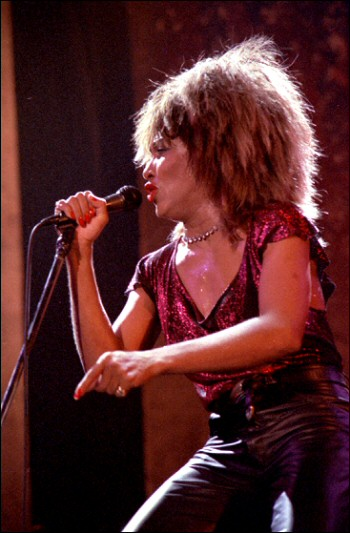
Tina Turner's "I Don't Wanna Fight" stayed at number one for three weeks in mid-1993.

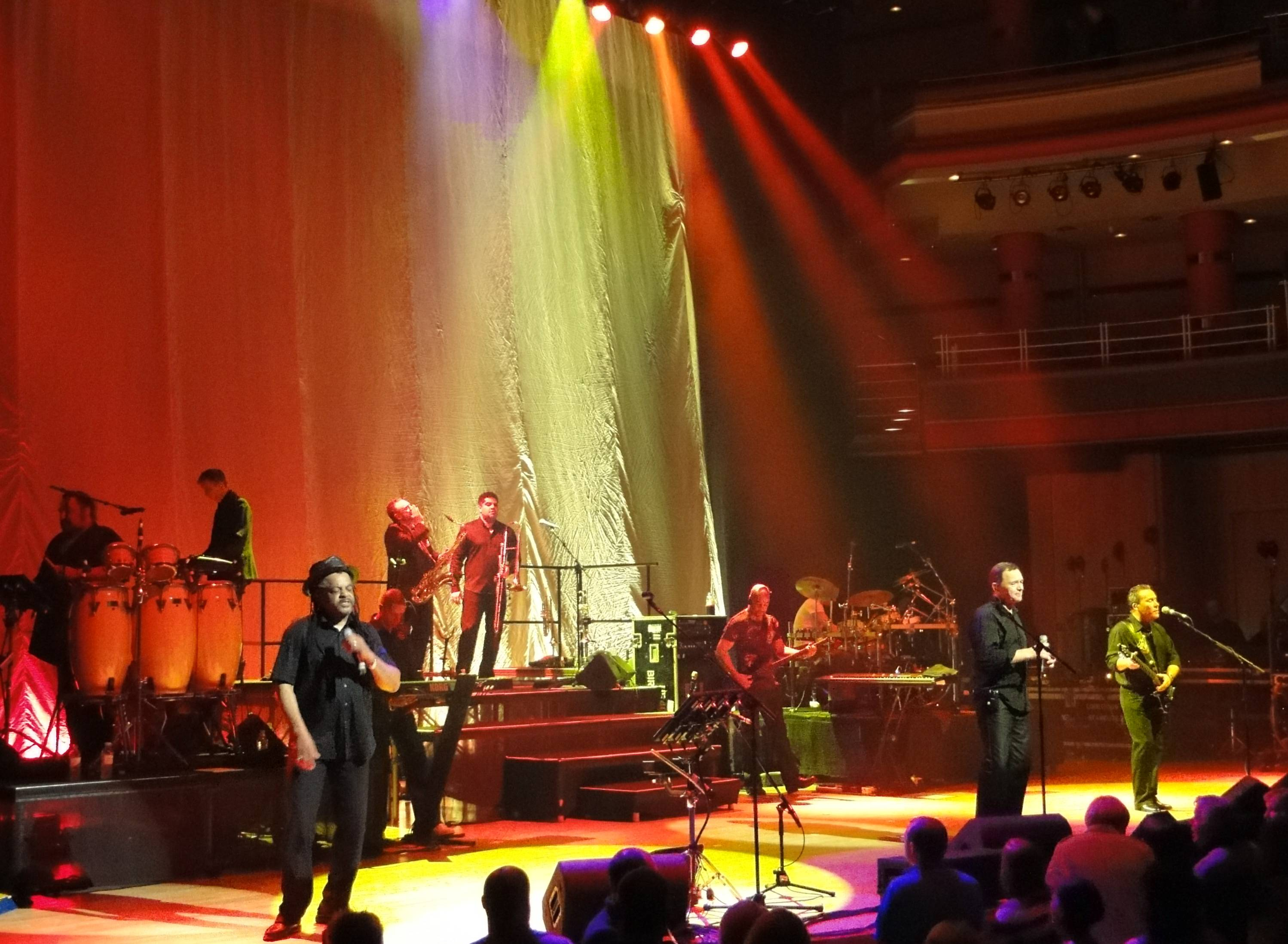
English reggae band UB40 topped the Canadian chart for two weeks with their international hit "(I Can't Help) Falling in Love with You".

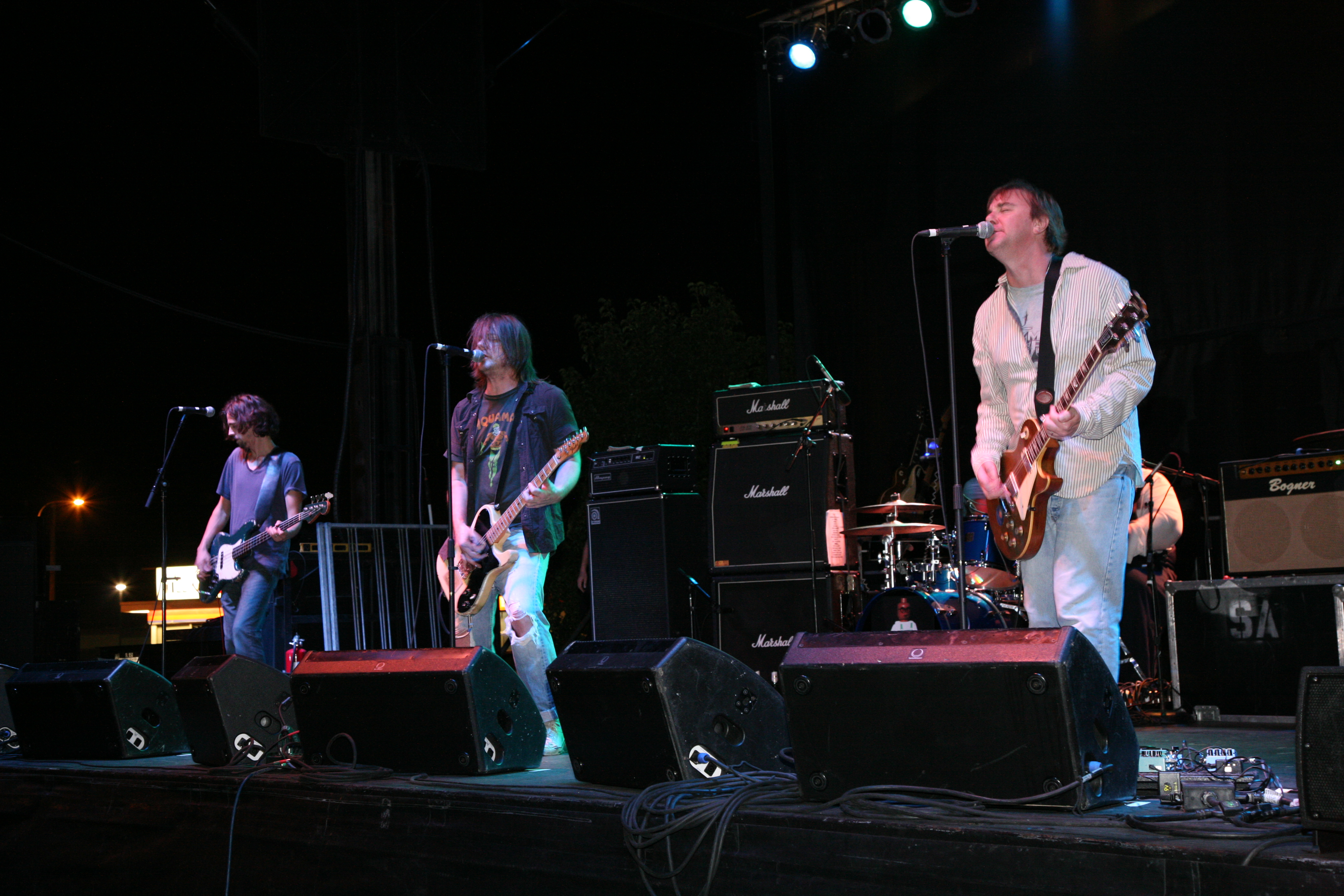
"Runaway Train" by Soul Asylum claimed the number-one spot for three weeks in August and September.

Issue date	Song	Artist	Reference
2 January (Note: Due to a two-week break in publication over the 1992/1993 New Year period, the weeks of 2 January and 9 January are inferred.)	"I Will Always Love You"†	Whitney Houston	
9 January	"I Will Always Love You"†	Whitney Houston	
16 January	"I Will Always Love You"†	Whitney Houston	
23 January	"I Will Always Love You"†	Whitney Houston	
30 January	"I Will Always Love You"†	Whitney Houston	
6 February	"I Will Always Love You"†	Whitney Houston	
13 February	"I Will Always Love You"†	Whitney Houston	
20 February	"I Will Always Love You"†	Whitney Houston	
27 February	"Steam"	Peter Gabriel	
6 March	"Ordinary World"	Duran Duran	
13 March	"Ordinary World"	Duran Duran	
20 March	"Ordinary World"	Duran Duran	
27 March	"Ordinary World"	Duran Duran	
3 April	"Ordinary World"	Duran Duran	
10 April	"If I Ever Lose My Faith in You"	Sting	
17 April	"If I Ever Lose My Faith in You"	Sting	
24 April	"If I Ever Lose My Faith in You"	Sting	
1 May	"I Have Nothing"	Whitney Houston	
8 May	"I Have Nothing"	Whitney Houston	
15 May	"I Have Nothing"	Whitney Houston	
22 May	"The Crying Game"	Boy George	
29 May	"Looking Through Patient Eyes"	P.M. Dawn	
5 June	"That's the Way Love Goes"	Janet Jackson	
12 June	"That's the Way Love Goes"	Janet Jackson	
19 June	"That's the Way Love Goes"	Janet Jackson	
26 June	"That's the Way Love Goes"	Janet Jackson	
3 July	"That's the Way Love Goes"	Janet Jackson	
10 July	"That's the Way Love Goes"	Janet Jackson	
17 July	"Have I Told You Lately"	Rod Stewart	
24 July	"I Don't Wanna Fight"	Tina Turner	
31 July	"I Don't Wanna Fight"	Tina Turner	
7 August	"I Don't Wanna Fight"	Tina Turner	
14 August	"(I Can't Help) Falling in Love with You"	UB40	
21 August	"(I Can't Help) Falling in Love with You"	UB40	
28 August	"Runaway Train"	Soul Asylum	
4 September	"Runaway Train"	Soul Asylum	
11 September	"Runaway Train"	Soul Asylum	
18 September	"Dreamlover"	Mariah Carey	
25 September	"Dreamlover"	Mariah Carey	
2 October	"Dreamlover"	Mariah Carey	
9 October	"Dreamlover"	Mariah Carey	
16 October	"Dreamlover"	Mariah Carey	
23 October	"Dreamlover"	Mariah Carey	
30 October	"I'd Do Anything for Love (But I Won't Do That)"	Meat Loaf	
6 November	"I'd Do Anything for Love (But I Won't Do That)"	Meat Loaf	
13 November	"No Rain"	Blind Melon	
20 November	"All That She Wants"	Ace of Base	
27 November	"All That She Wants"	Ace of Base	
4 December	"Please Forgive Me"	Bryan Adams	
11 December	"Please Forgive Me"	Bryan Adams	
18 December	"Please Forgive Me"	Bryan Adams	
25 December	"Please Forgive Me"	Bryan Adams	

== See also ==
- 1993 in music
- List of Billboard Hot 100 number ones of 1993
