= Letters from a Porcupine =

- Produced by: Chris Jones
- Starring: Shannon Hoon, Brad Smith, Christopher Thorn, Glen Graham, Rogers Stevens, Jena Kraus
- Music by: Blind Melon
- Release date: November 19, 1996
- Running time: 72 minutes
- Language: English

Letters from a Porcupine is a 1996 documentary style film made up of footage from the musical career of the alternative rock band Blind Melon including music videos, interviews, live performances and home movie footage.

Several pieces of footage were filmed by Shannon Hoon and his own video recorder which he was said to have brought everywhere.

It also contains unreleased music by the band such as a song dubbed "no business".

Letters from a Porcupine received a Grammy nomination in 1997 for Best Long Form Video.
