= Classic Masters =

Classic Masters may refer to:

- Classic Masters (April Wine album), 2002
- Classic Masters (Blind Melon album), 2002
- Classic Masters (Crowded House album), 2003
- Classic Masters (General Public album), 2002
- Classic Masters (Grand Funk Railroad album), 2002
- Classic Masters (Queensrÿche album), 2003
- Classic Masters (Sammy Hagar album), 2002
