= Nico (album) =

Compilation album by Blind Melon
- Released: November 12, 1996
- Recorded: 1991–March 7, 1995
- Genre: Alternative rock
- Length: 41:02
- Label: Capitol
- Producers: Blind Melon; Andy Wallace; Mike Napolitano

Blind Melon chronology
Soup (1995)	Nico (1996)	For My Friends (2008)

Singles from Nico
- 1. "Soul One" Released: 1996; 2. "The Pusher" Released: 1996

Professional ratings
Review scores
Source	Rating
AllMusic	3.5/5 stars
Collector's Guide to Heavy Metal	6/10
NME	4/10

Nico is a compilation album by American rock band Blind Melon, released in 1996 by Capitol Records. The album was released after lead singer Shannon Hoon's cocaine overdose that resulted in his death in 1995. The album was named for his daughter, Nico Blue, and the proceeds arising from album sales were placed in a college trust for her. It features unreleased tracks, recordings started by Hoon and finished by the band, unreleased versions of previous songs ("No Rain" and "St. Andrew's Hall") and the cover songs "The Pusher" (Hoyt Axton) and "John Sinclair" (John Lennon).

== Track listing ==
All songs written by Blind Melon, except where noted

No.	Title	Writer(s)	Length
1.	"The Pusher" (Recorded in Mammoth Mountain, California, April 1994)	Hoyt Axton, with additional lyrics by Shannon Hoon	3:06
2.	"Hell" (Recorded at Kelsey's Playground, Lafayette, Indiana, 1993)		2:02
3.	"Soup" (Recorded at Kingsway Studio, New Orleans, Louisiana, November 1994, during the Soup sessions)		3:09
4.	"No Rain" (Ripped Away Version) (Recorded at Bullet Sound Studio, The Netherlands, November 10, 1993)		2:25
5.	"Soul One" (Demo) (Recorded at Downtown Rehearsal, Los Angeles, California, 1991)		3:15
6.	"John Sinclair" (Recorded at Riversound Studio, New York City, March 7, 1995)	John Lennon	3:36
7.	"All That I Need" (Recorded in Mammoth Mountain, California, April 1994)		2:50
8.	"Glitch" (Recorded at Kelsey's Playground, Lafayette, Indiana, 1993)		3:20
9.	"Life Ain't So Shitty" (Recorded in a St. Louis hotel room, 1994)		1:50
10.	"Swallowed" (Recorded at Kingsway Studio, New Orleans, Louisiana, November 1994, during the Soup sessions)		3:45
11.	"Pull" (Recorded at Kingsway Studio, New Orleans, Louisiana, January 1995, during the Soup sessions)		3:28
12.	"St. Andrew's Hall" (Recorded in various hotel rooms during the 1994 U.S. tour)		3:36
13.	"Letters from a Porcupine" (Recorded on Christopher Thorn's answering machine by Shannon Hoon, calling from home in Lafayette, Indiana, 1994)		1:54
Total length:			41:02

Japanese edition
No.	Title	Writer(s)	Length
14.	"Three Is a Magic Number" (from the Schoolhouse Rock! Rocks album)	Bob Dorough	3:14
Total length:			44:16

== Personnel ==
- Blind Melon – producer, engineer, mixing
- David Michael Dill – engineer
- Shannon Hoon – acoustic guitar, lead vocals, engineer
- Ken Lomas – engineer, assistant engineer
- Brad Smith – bass guitar, dumbek, flute, conga, backing vocals, double bass
- Rogers Stevens – acoustic guitar, conga, electric guitar, Hammond organ, shaker
- Miles Tackett – cello
- Andy Wallace – producer, engineer, mixing
- Howie Weinberg – mastering
- Glen Graham – dumbek, percussion, conga, drums, Mellotron
- Liz Heller – executive producer
- Tommy Steele – art direction
- Jean Krikorian – design
- Mike Napolitano – producer, assistant engineer, mixing
- Christopher Thorn – acoustic guitar, banjo, electric guitar, tambourine, bells, Mellotron, lap steel guitar
- Jeffery Fey – art direction
- Danny Clinch – harmonica, photography
- Leo Rossi – technical advisor
- Lyle Eaves – engineer
- Stephen Moses – trombone
- Patrick Halligan – triangle
- Chris Jones – executive producer
- John Burton – engineer

== Charts ==
Chart (1996)	Peak position
US Billboard 200	161
Canada Top Albums/CDs (RPM)	90
