= Rogers Stevens =

American guitarist (born 1970)

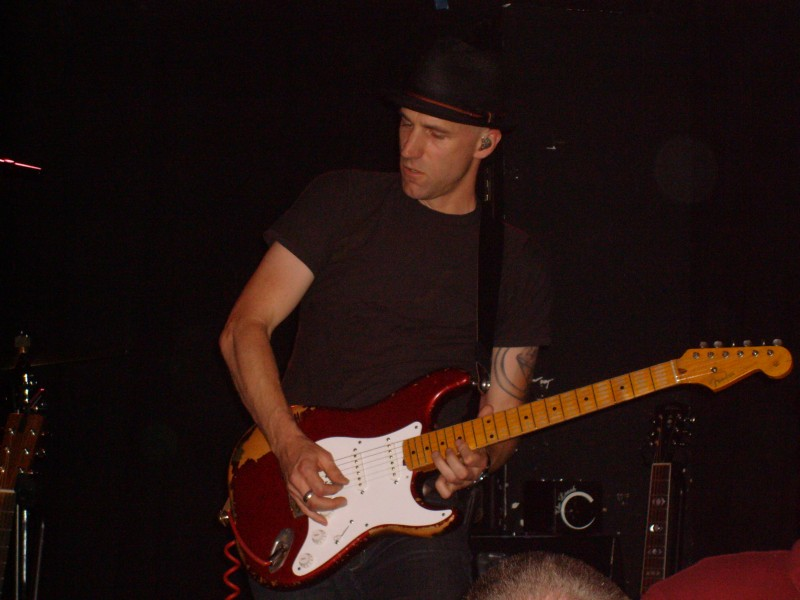

Background information
- Born: Thomas Rogers Stevens; October 31, 1970 (age 55); West Point, Mississippi, U.S.
- Genres: Alternative rock; folk rock; psychedelic rock; roots rock; blues rock; grunge
- Occupations: Musician, Attorney
- Instruments: Guitar, piano, keyboard
- Years active: 1990–present
- Labels: EMI; Capitol; Old Lady Records

Thomas Rogers Stevens (born 31 October 1970) is an American guitarist, best known for being a founding member of the alternative rock band Blind Melon. He has also been a member of the bands Extra Virgin and The Tender Trio, and he is an attorney.

== Biography ==
=== Early life ===
Rogers Stevens was born in West Point, Mississippi, United States, where he grew up with future Blind Melon bandmates Glen Graham and Brad Smith. He was forced to take piano lessons by his mother as a child, and in his high school years, Brad Smith taught Stevens how to play the guitar. Smith and Stevens played together in various cover bands while in high school.

=== Musical influences ===
When first beginning to play the guitar, Stevens's early influences were hard rock bands, such as AC/DC and Van Halen, as well as classic rock bands such as The Rolling Stones and R.E.M. When forming the Blind Melon sound, he had been listening to bands such as Cream and Led Zeppelin. He has stated that he enjoys listening to bands such as The White Stripes, Muse, and Tool, among others. He also cites jazz as a major influence.

=== Blind Melon ===
In 1988, Rogers and Smith left Mississippi for Los Angeles, California to pursue their musical interests. Once in Los Angeles, they played in many bands together that did not last more than a few weeks. It was during one of these stints that Brad met future Blind Melon rhythm guitarist Christopher Thorn. Rogers called Glen Graham to come out to Los Angeles to be the band's drummer. After auditioning many singers the band met fellow member Shannon Hoon at a party through a mutual friend. During his audition, he played his song "Change" on acoustic guitar, and the band immediately picked him.

With the band's lineup and name set, the band was signed to Capitol Records in 1991. Capitol Records released their self-titled debut album, Blind Melon, in September 1992. The track "No Rain" became a smash hit, and brought Blind Melon into the spotlight, and causing their debut album to eventually go platinum four times over. Blind Melon spent 1993 on tour, opening for acts such as Neil Young and Lenny Kravitz, and starting in 1994, they began headlining their own tour. Around this time, Blind Melon was nominated Grammys for Best New Artist and Best Rock Performance.

During the touring, Hoon's drug use began to escalate. His girlfriend, Lisa Crouse, gave birth to their first daughter, Nico Blue Hoon, in early 1995, and their second album, Soup, was released in August 1995. At the encouragement of the rest of the band, he checked himself into rehab. Despite concern of Hoon going back to his dangerous ways, the band went on tour in support of Soup, with a drug counselor accompanying Hoon. The counselor could not keep Hoon from going back to his drug use, and left the tour after only a month and a half. Hoon was found dead at the age of 28 on the band's tour bus the night after a concert from an accidental drug overdose on October 21, 1995. The band released their final album, Nico, named after Hoon's daughter, in 1996.

Despite efforts to keep the band going by auditioning for new singers, the band realized they could not keep going, and eventually went their separate ways in 1999. Stevens has stated that he believed at that point that the band was finished and that they never considered playing together again.

Despite this, in late 2006, an agent from Atlantic Records brought vocalist Travis Warren to Brad Smith and Christopher Thorn's studio to work on his demos and to get him a record contract. After listening to Warren, the band got the idea to bring Warren in as the singer of Blind Melon, and called Rogers back to the studio. Blind Melon reformed, with Travis Warren as the new lead vocalist, and released For My Friends, their first studio album in 12 years. Warren left the band in 2008; he has since started performing with them again as of 2010.

=== Other musical projects and personal life ===
Following the break of Blind Melon, in 1999, Rogers and musician Rene Lopez formed the band Extra Virgin. They released one album, titled "12 Stories High", which was recorded in at Kingsway in New Orleans. The sound of the band is said to be "in the same neighborhood" as the music of Blind Melon, his previous band. Despite gaining record label interests, the band broke up in 2002.

After this breakup, he started the band The Tender Trio with Rene Lopez and Royston Langdon of Spacehog fame. The band broke up in March 2006.

Stevens has stated that he plays guitar and paints in his free time. He also has a daughter and a son.

Stevens attended Delaware County Community college with good friend Chris Donohue and graduated from the University of Pennsylvania School of Law. In December 2014, he was reported to be an associate in the labor and employment group of Philadelphia law firm Ballard Spahr. While there, he was a guitarist for the firm's band, "Ballard Spahr Galactica." He is now an associate in the Labor and Employment group of Philadelphia law firm Troutman Pepper Hamilton Sanders LLP.

In 2023, Stevens collaborated with Blind Melon bassist Nathan Towne, resulting in the release of a self-titled debut, which also included Stevens providing lead vocals.

== Discography ==
=== With Blind Melon ===
Studio Albums:

- Blind Melon, 1992
- Soup, 1995
- Nico, 1996
- Classic Masters (Blind Melon), 2002
- Live At the Palace, 2006
- For My Friends, 2008

EPs/Demos

- Sippin' Time Sessions (Unreleased EP), 1991

=== With Extra Virgin ===
Studio Albums:

- Twelve Stories High, 2000

EPs/Demos:

- First Cold Pressing (Demo), 1999
- Rock City (Unreleased Demo), 2002

=== With The Tender Trio ===
EPs/Demos:

- Hamburger Demos (Demo), 2004
