= Three Is a Magic Number =

1973 educational song from Schoolhouse Rock!

- Schoolhouse Rock! episode
- Episode no.: Season 1 Episode 1
- Written by: Bob Dorough
- Original air date: September 2, 1971
- Running time: 3:16

Episode chronology
← Previous —	Next → "My Hero, Zero"

"Three is a Magic Number" is an educational song and segment about the number three in the Schoolhouse Rock! series that aired as the program's pilot episode on January 6, 1973. Written and performed by the accomplished jazz artist Bob Dorough, the lyrics contain multiplication tables as well as a mystical assortment of trios including "past and the present and the future" and "the heart and the brain and the body". Because of the quality of Three is a Magic Number's songwriting, Schoolhouse Rock! was expanded from an album into a television program.

The song is associated with Generation X culture of the U.S., and has been covered or adapted by artists like De La Soul (as "The Magic Number"), Blind Melon, and Jack Johnson.

== Development ==
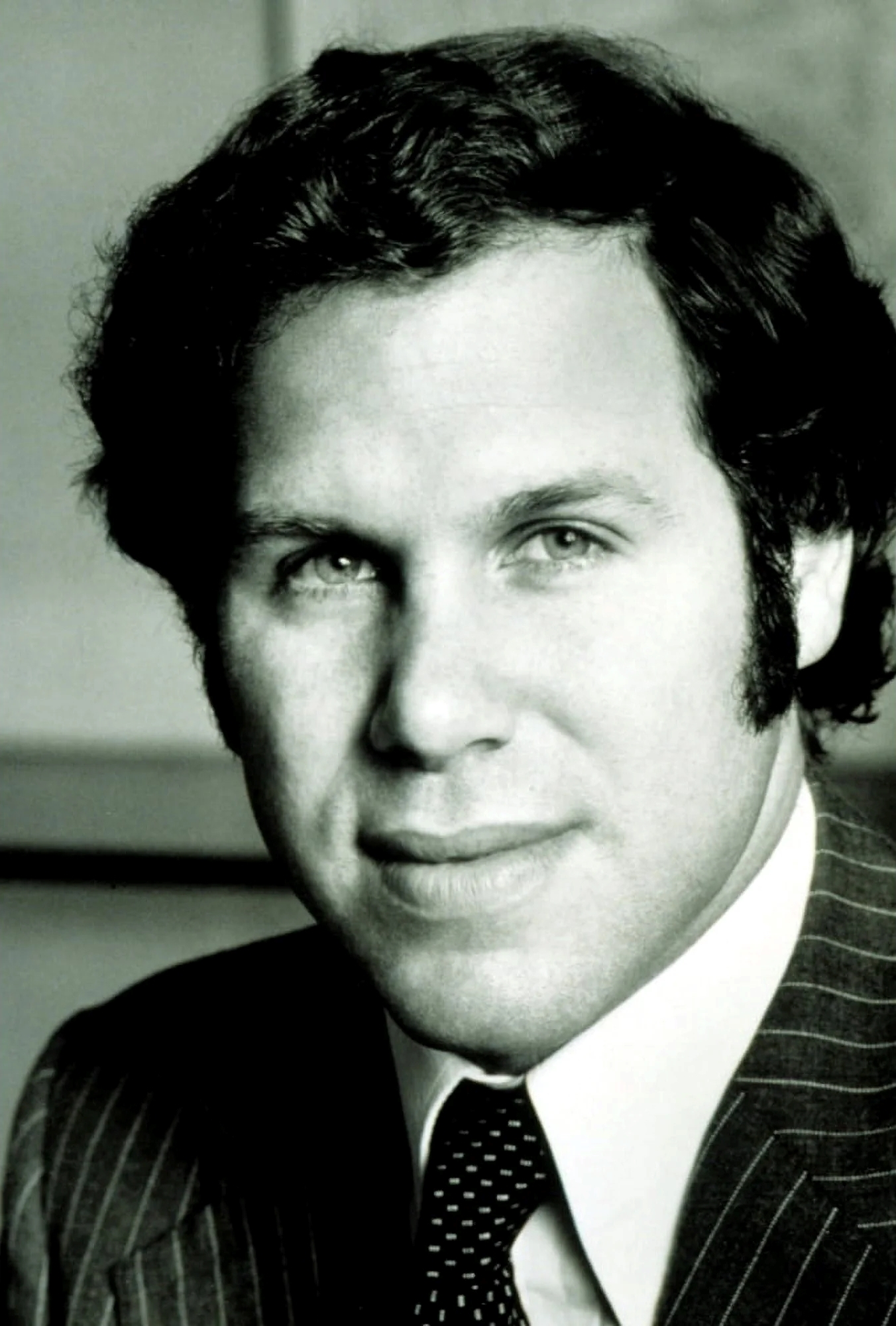
Michael D. Eisner, better known for his later career as CEO of Disney, wrote that "3 was the most emotional number of all"

The idea for rock songs of multiplication tables came from advertising executive David McCall, whose 11-year-old son struggled in math: "It seemed strange that he knew the words to every rock song ever written, but didn't know his multiplication tables" McCall set out to create an album, and worked with one of his agency's creative directors, George Newall, to find songwriters. When initial submissions were too sappy and unpleasantly childish, they commissioned Bob Dorough, a jazz musician known for clever lyrics and collaborations with creative greats like Miles Davis, Allen Ginsberg, and Lenny Bruce. With little instruction other than to not "write down" to children, Dorough later said: "It took me two weeks to come up with the first one. I did a little studying and looked in a New Math book. I started gathering all of the threes I could think of: trinities, three's a crowd, third time's the charm…. The whole thing was pretty much off the wall. When I brought 'Three Is a Magic Number' to them, they all jumped up and down and wanted me to write more."

McCall's employees Tom Yohe and George Newall described their reaction: "We were completely blown away. Astonished. Astounded. Bob had taken the number three and twisted and turned it so many ways that it had truly been transformed into 'a magic number.'" Tom Yohe, an art director, was so inspired by Dorough's illustrative lyrics that he drew sketches at his kitchen table that eventually became the storybook. ABC was the largest client of the agency McCaffrey & McCall at the time, and the broadcaster's desire for educational children's programming prompted McCall to launch development of a television show. As a board member of Bank Street College of Education, McCall used his connections to test the songs on teachers and students in eight schools. Feedback was phenomenal.

It started with me coining that line: Three is a magic number. Then I went to some of my esoteric books to find out if three really was a magic number. It turns out it is. It's one of several.

— Bob Dorough, composer of "Three is a Magic Number"

Tom Yohe's storyboards were animated for "$15,000 or some ridiculous amount like that" estimates Radford Stone, a producer. In the pitch meeting with ABC which "Three is a Magic Number" was played, ABC's vice president of children's programming (and eventual Disney CEO) Michael Eisner, bought the program immediately. Prominent Looney Tunes cartoonist Chuck Jones attended the meeting with Eisner and expressed similar enthusiasm, with the animated short getting its first airing during the prime time premiere of Jones's show Curiosity Shop on September 2, 1971.

In late 1972, Multiplication Rock was greenlit to go to series. A press release said: "Set to lively music and rhyming music, each film focuses on an individual number represented by its unique character. Through identification with each character and by learning the lyrics, the multiplication tables, dates, places and facts will take deeper root in the child's mind."

== Reception ==
Three is a Magic Number would be re-aired, with a small and potentially misleading factoid removed, as the debut episode of Multiplication Rock on January 6, 1973. With three-minute episodes, Multiplication Rock episodes fit between weekend programming, airing five times on Saturday and two on Sunday. Jay Sharbutt wrote in the Associated Press, "It was a complicated, syncopated song — as are all of them — that still managed to swing, even if you lost track of the math on that first go-around" and noted "the lyrics weren't exactly out of the Carly Simon songbag, but they got the job done".

=== Cultural touchstone of Generation X ===
For that generation of adults who can't remember where they were when President Kennedy was shot because they were too young or weren't yet born, 'Schoolhouse Rock' forges another common bond, nearly as strong.

— columnist Phil Rosenthal, 1993

In 1993, Phil Rosenthal wrote: "For a group casualty dismissed as the MTV Generation, the three-minute 'Schoolhouse Rock' segments ... were the first music videos." An article in the Daily Illini pointed to Schoolhouse Rock! as a campus fixture among students in 1996, who were rewatching and the episodes into adulthood: "College students are waxing nostalgic over the crude animation and jazzy tunes." We are convinced the primary reason SAT scores are so low is the absence of Schoolhouse Rock... No schoolteacher or parent taught us anything so early that has stuck so well."

"If you were an American kid around when I was (nine-teen-seventy-cough), you probably have 'Schoolhouse Rock' hard-wired into your brain too. The musical shorts, which began airing on ABC in 1973, taught Generation X multiplication, grammar, history, and, eventually, nostalgia. That last lesson stuck best."

== Covers and samples ==
=== De La Soul ===
On December 11, 1989, the hip-hop trio De La Soul released an adaptation called "The Magic Number" which reached the Billboard charts. It was the opening song of their debut album, 3 Feet High and Rising. Along with Me, Myself, and I, it was described as a fan favorite. A personalized chorus named group members "Mase, Dove and me" as the magic three. Unusual samples appear throughout the song: the voice of Johnny Cash asks "How high's the water, Mama?", a clip of Eddie Murphy says "Anybody in the audience ever been hit by a car?", a breakbeat from "The Crunge" plays, and Syl Johnson says "do the shing-a-ling".

De La Soul differed from the typical hip hop's machismo, and their distinct style of sampling further set them apart. "To hear such references, themselves a form of reverence, years later at a dance party, is to be filled with nostalgia—and possibility." wrote Kevin Young. "Lyrically, their rhymes were innocent without ever being childish: 'The Magic Number; pulled from the edu-tainment of Schoolhouse Rock! for its friendly vibe", wrote A.D. Amorosi.

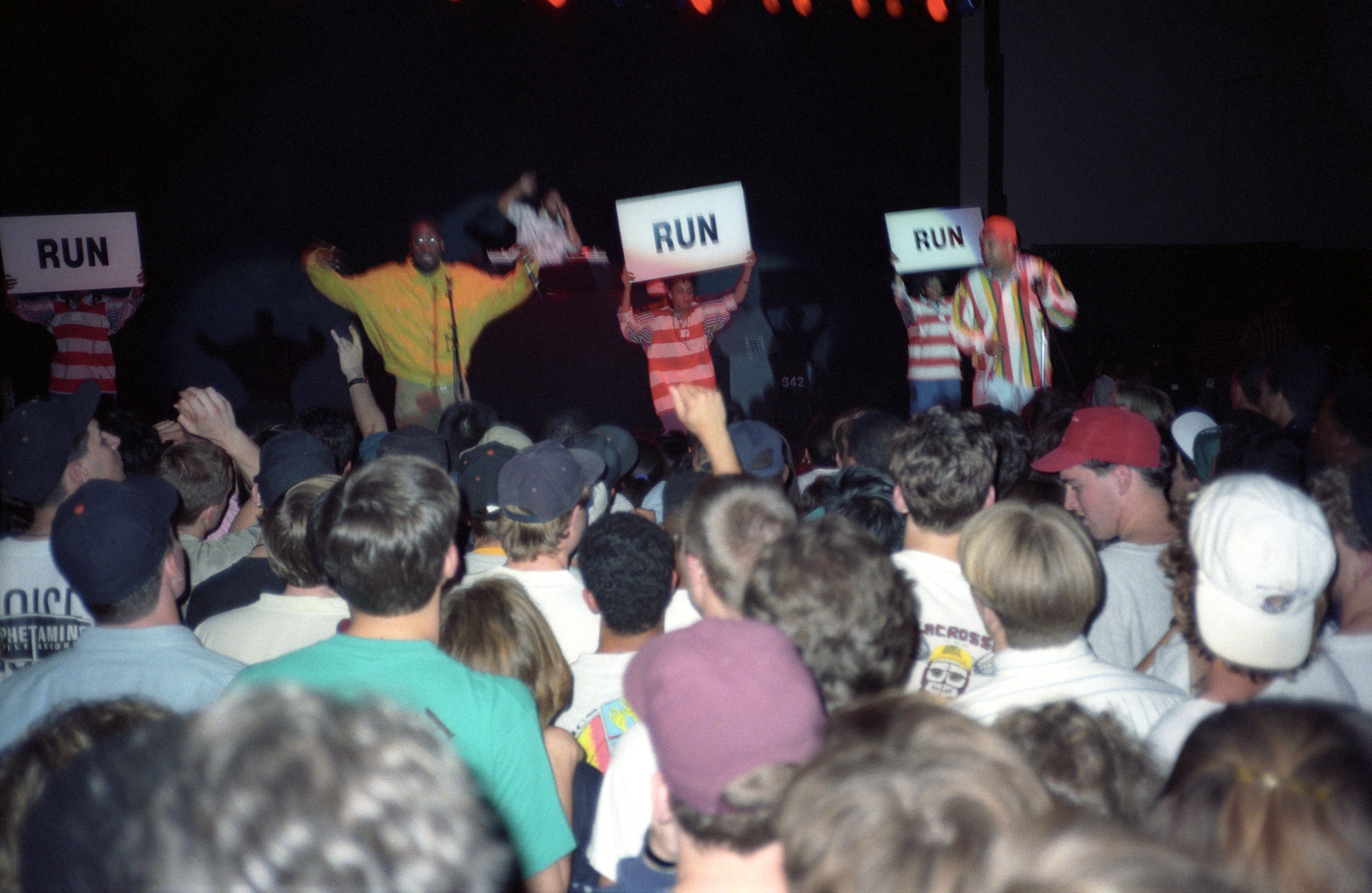
De La Soul performing at the Dillon Gymnasium in 1991

In a 2009 interview with Rolling Stone, Trugoy of De La Soul explained that the song started from experimenting with a Multiplication Rock record they had on hand. "Obviously three of us in the group, '3 is the magic number' became the philosophy, but mostly, it was just a song that we loved and it became part of the album." In 2021, the track was featured in Spider-Man: No Way Home.

The album was not available for streaming until March 3, 2023 due to disagreements between De La Soul and their former record label, Tommy Boy, which had not delineated digital music permissions in the original contract. Potential sample infractions may have contributed to the difficulties. After 34 years, Tommy Boy changed ownership, and De La Soul agreed to a deal despite calling it "unfair" and suggesting 90% of the money would go to the label in a statement on Instagram.

=== Blind Melon ===
Three is a Magic Number was covered by the alt rock band Blind Melon in the 1996 tribute album Schoolhouse Rock! Rocks. It was the band's last recording before the singer Shannon Hoon died of a cocaine overdose. "We had the 'Schoolhouse Rock' videos on our tour bus for years, really bad bootleg copies before they released the official versions," said guitarist Rogers Stevens. "These pieces made a big impression on me personally. We were covering 'Three is a Magic Number' for years," he said. "It's sweetly sad to hear Hoon singing about those aforementioned 3 times tables" wrote Matthew Crowley in The Post-Star.

=== Jack Johnson ===
A cover of "Three is a Magic Number" appears on the soundtrack of the 2006 Curious George movie sung by Jack Johnson. Though most lines are the same, the title is "The 3 R's" the chorus refrain is "reduce, reuse, recycle".

== Legacy ==
"That is not easy to do"

— bandmate of Bob Dorough on his ability to write engaging music about rote math facts and the bureaucratic process

Widespread nostalgia for Schoolhouse Rock! spread in the 1990s among Generation X. Further covers have been performed by Jeff Buckley, Embrace, and the Christian punk band Crashdog in a modified 1993 cover that focused on the resurrection of Jesus ("It took three days to kill the king and in three days he rose again"). A stage adaption of the series, "Schoolhouse Rock Live!" features the song and was written by Scott Ferguson in 1993 and performed in Chicago before an 11-month off-Broadway run in New York City, followed by local and school productions of the musical, which offered a "Junior" version. In 2011, there were an estimated 500 annual performances.

In 2002, it was ranked seventh in an online poll of Schoolhouse Rock! songs conducted by Walt Disney Home Entertainment ("Conjunction Junction" and "I'm Just a Bill" took first and second). George Newall and Tom Yohe counted "Three is a Magic Number" as their favorite, and while Bob Dorough bristled at choosing a favorite, he said: "Naturally I feel a great affinity for 'Three' because it's more of less what got me to do the whole thing." Bob Dorough played gigs into his 90s, typically interrupting the jazz with "Conjunction Junction" and "Three is a Magic Number" to please fans. He held a free concert at the Kennedy Center on January 6, 2013 for the 40th anniversary of the series.

"Now they go to bars and drink! And they discover me again, playing at bars!"

— Bob Dorough on kid Schoolhouse Rock! fans growing up and finding his jazz.

Schoolhouse Rock! music was inducted into the National Recording Registry in 2018. The 50th anniversary was celebrated in 2023, with the television event Schoolhouse Rock! 50th Anniversary Singalong that ended with a Black Eyed Peas cover of "Three is a Magic Number" ("Black Eyed Peas consist of three and that's a magic number.") Reflecting on the 50-year milestone, James Poniewozik wrote in the New York Times: "The blissful Three Is a Magic Number isn't just a primer on multiples; it's a rumination on the triad foundations of the universe, from geometry to love. (If your voice does not break singing, 'A man and a woman had a little baby,' you're doing something wrong.)"

== Additional links ==
- Schoolhouse Rock! creator photos on archived fansite
- History of Schoolhouse Rock! on archived fansite
