= Chris Shinn =

American singer, songwriter and musician

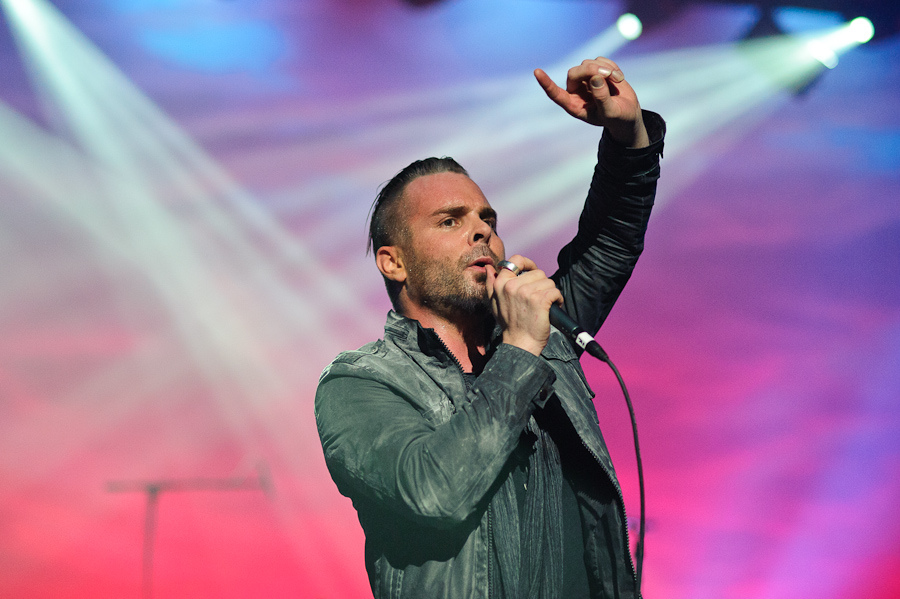
- Shinn in 2012

Background information
- Genres: Alternative rock; psychedelic rock
- Occupations: Musician; songwriter
- Instruments: Vocals; guitar
- Years active: 1998–present
- Label: Capitol
- Formerly of: Unified Theory; Live

Chris Shinn is an American singer, songwriter and musician. From March 2012 to December 2016, he was the lead singer of the band Live. He was previously the lead singer of the band Unified Theory.

== Unified Theory ==
=== Beginnings ===
Unified Theory began to form in early 1998. After the initial idea to continue Blind Melon with a new lead vocalist did not work out, Smith and Thorn decided to start a new band. Thorn discovered Shinn on a scouting mission in Los Angeles.

"Chris has an exceptional voice. I was blown away," says Thorn, "You have to like people you're working with. We wanted someone with personality and a voice. He's a fun guy and I was completely floored by his songs."

Unified Theory was originally called Luma, they issued a four-track CD through their website in 1999. After they were signed to Universal Records later that year, they changed their name to Unified Theory after the theory Albert Einstein was working on when he died.

=== Debut and demise ===
In August 2000 the band issued their self-titled debut album. While working on tracks for a second album, delays set the band back, and Krusen grew somewhat frustrated and left to join Nickelback on their first major North American tour as a touring musician, ultimately leading to Unified Theory's eventual breakup.

=== Brief reformation ===
The band have since announced plans to release a new album consisting of the recorded material for the second album (some of which has never been heard) as well as songs from the Luma period. No timetable has been set for this release. Unified Theory has recently filmed a music video for the song "15 Hits", a song set to be released on their upcoming album. The group played a reunion show on August 4, 2010, at the King King in Hollywood.

== Live ==
On March 12, 2012, it was revealed that Chris would be the new lead singer of the rock band Live. He played the band's dress rehearsal show to a hometown crowd at the Strand-Capitol Theater in York, Pennsylvania, on March 12, 2012. He toured with the band and performed on the band's 2014 album The Turn.

On December 12, 2016, Live announced that original lead singer Ed Kowalczyk had returned to the band, though no reference was made to Shinn in the announcement. All references to his tenure in the band have been removed from the band's website and The Turn is absent from their listed discography.

== Discography ==
Album	Artist	Type	Label	Release date
The Turn	Live	Studio	Think Loud Recordings	Oct 28, 2014
Chris Shinn	Chris Shinn	Studio		2012
Everything Is Energy	Everything Is Energy	Studio	The Nest Records	July 12, 2007
Cinematic	Unified Theory	Compilation	Universal Records, Wishbone Recordings	Jan 1, 2007
Unified Theory	Unified Theory	Studio	Universal Records	August 15, 2000
Luma	Luma	EP	None	1999

== Singles ==
Song	Album	Year
"California"	Unified Theory	2000
"Wither"	Unified Theory	2000
