= Schoolhouse Rock! Rocks =

1996 tribute album by various artists

Compilation album (Tribute album) by Various Artists
- Released: April 9, 1996
- Genre: Alternative rock
- Length: 48:20
- Label: Atlantic, Lava

Schoolhouse Rock! Rocks is a tribute album based on the American animated TV series, Schoolhouse Rock! It was released by Atlantic/Lava Records in 1996 and contains 15 tracks, the original "Schoolhouse Rocky" theme and covers of 14 songs from the series performed by popular music artists. A promo-only 7" single was also distributed to promote the album, featuring tracks by Man or Astro-man? and Pavement. This single was pressed on yellow vinyl. "Three Is a Magic Number" was one of the last recordings made by Blind Melon's Shannon Hoon, who died of a drug overdose on October 21, 1995 .

A portion of the sales of the album went to the Children's Defense Fund.

== Reception ==
Reception to Schoolhouse Rock! Rocks was generally very positive, with Entertainment Weekly rating it a B+ and commenting on the surprising charm and high-quality contributions by the popular young artists.

== Track listing ==
All tracks written by Bob Dorough, except where noted.

No.	Title	Writer(s)	Performer	Length
1.	"Schoolhouse Rocky"	Dorough, Tom Yohe	Bob Dorough and Friends	0:13
2.	"I'm Just a Bill"	Dave Frishberg	Deluxx Folk Implosion	3:26
3.	"Three Is a Magic Number"		Blind Melon	3:14
4.	"Conjunction Junction"		Better Than Ezra	3:44
5.	"Electricity, Electricity!"		Goodness	3:21
6.	"No More Kings"	Lynn Ahrens	Pavement	4:22
7.	"The Shot Heard 'Round the World"		Ween	3:09
8.	"My Hero, Zero"		The Lemonheads	3:06
9.	"The Energy Blues"	George Newall	Biz Markie	3:10
10.	"Little Twelvetoes"		Chavez	3:56
11.	"Verb: That's What's Happening"		Moby	4:29
12.	"Interplanet Janet"	Ahrens	Man or Astro-man?	2:46
13.	"Lolly, Lolly, Lolly, Get Your Adverbs Here"		Buffalo Tom	2:13
14.	"Unpack Your Adjectives"	Newall	Daniel Johnston	3:05
15.	"The Tale of Mr. Morton"	Ahrens	Skee-Lo	4:05

== Single tracks ==
Side A

- "No More Kings" by Pavement – 4:22

Side B

- "Interplanet Janet" by Man or Astro-man? – 2:46

== Chart performance ==
The album charted at number 70 on the Billboard 200 in 1996.
