= Live at the Palace =

Live album by Blind Melon
- Released: April 4, 2006
- Recorded: October 11, 1995
- Genre: Alternative rock
- Label: Capitol

Blind Melon chronology
The Best of Blind Melon (2005)	Live at the Palace (2006)	For My Friends (2008)

Professional ratings
Review scores
Source	Rating
AllMusic	3/5 stars
The Encyclopedia of Popular Music	2/5 stars

Live at the Palace is a live album recorded at The Palace in Hollywood on October 11, 1995, by the band Blind Melon. It is the fourth album featuring vocals from former Blind Melon frontman Shannon Hoon before his death, recorded ten days before Hoon's passing.

== Track listing ==
The album was reissued on October 17, 2006, with new artwork, correcting the track listing error on the original artwork.

1. "Galaxie"
2. "Toes Across the Floor"
3. "Tones of Home"
4. "Soup"
5. "Soak the Sin"
6. "Change"
7. "No Rain"
8. "Wilt"
9. "Vernie"
10. "Walk"
11. "Skinned"
12. "Time"

== External sources ==
- CDUniverse track listing
