= Tones of Home =

Single by Blind Melon

from the album Blind Melon
- Released: 1992
- Length: 4:26
- Label: Capitol
- Songwriter: Blind Melon
- Producers: Rick Parashar, Blind Melon

Blind Melon singles chronology
"Tones of Home" (1992)	"No Rain" (1993)

"Tones of Home" is a song by American rock band Blind Melon, released in 1992 as their first single. It reached number 20 on the US Billboard Modern Rock Tracks chart. After the breakthrough success of the next single, "No Rain", "Tones of Home" was released again; it was accompanied by a new video; which was a sequel to the "No Rain" video and its "Bee Girl" storyline. Upon its re-release, the song reached number 10 on the Billboard Album Rock Tracks chart.

"Tones of Home" appears on Blind Melon's self-titled debut album as well as the Tones of Home: The Best of Blind Melon compilation and the Classic Masters compilation. The song was featured on Guitar Hero: Warriors of Rock.

== Music video ==
The original video for "Tones of Home" was released in 1992. This original version consists predominantly of live footage taken from various Blind Melon concerts. Other pieces of footage consist of shots from parks (kids on swings) and footage of a house overlooking farm property. This video was directed by Samuel Bayer.

After the release of the video for "No Rain" and its success the band released the second version of "Tones of Home". This video starts with an older woman sitting in a rocking chair next to a quaint little cottage house, that seemed to have a child living in it at one point (There is a tire-swing in a tree). The footage flashes between the older woman and a concert Blind Melon performed for an enthusiastic audience at the Tower Theatre in Downtown Los Angeles. The old lady is reading a letter she received which seems to contain the lyrics to the song. Near the end of the video, we see the lady pull a small bee costume out of a box. She holds the bee costume up to her torso and then dances and bows in much the same way as the Bee Girl from the "No Rain" music video. It is through this performance that the viewer is meant to understand that the old lady is actually the Bee Girl after many years have passed.

The video appears on the Blind Melon DVD compilation release Letters From a Porcupine.

== Track listings ==
US maxi-CD single

1. "Tones of Home" – 4:27
2. "Time" (live) – 8:30
3. "Wooh D.O.G." (Playground version) – 1:44

European EP

1. "Tones of Home" – 4:29
2. "No Rain" (live) – 5:26
3. "Drive" (live) – 5:42
4. "Soak the Sin" (live) – 3:41

== Release history ==
Region	Date	Format(s)	Label(s)	Ref.
United States	1992	Maxi-CD	Capitol	
Japan	October 28, 1992	Maxi-CD	Capitol	
United Kingdom	June 1, 1993	12-inch vinyl; CD	Capitol	
Australia	March 7, 1994	CD; cassette	Capitol	
