= For My Friends =

Studio album by Blind Melon
- Released: April 22, 2008
- Recorded: 2007–2008
- Studio: Studio Wishbone, North Hollywood, California
- Genre: Alternative rock
- Length: 50:23
- Label: Adrenaline Music Group
- Producer: Blind Melon

Blind Melon chronology
Live at the Palace (2006)	For My Friends (2008)

Professional ratings
Review scores
Source	Rating
AllMusic	link
Consequence of Sound	A−
Inside Pulse	4/5 stars
PopMatters	7/10 stars
Punk Rock Theory	7/10
Ultimate Guitar	8/10

For My Friends is the third studio album by American rock band Blind Melon, released April 22, 2008. It is their first album in twelve years, and the first to feature lead singer Travis Warren who was recruited after the death of previous lead singer Shannon Hoon.

== Track listing ==
All songs written by Blind Melon as One (Glen Graham, Brad Smith, Rogers Stevens, Christopher Thorn and Travis Warren)

No.	Title	Length
1.	"For My Friends"	2:46
2.	"With the Right Set of Eyes"	3:45
3.	"Wishing Well"	4:15
4.	"Sometimes"	4:10
5.	"Tumblin' Down"	3:16
6.	"Down on the Pharmacy"	4:18
7.	"Make a Difference"	3:55
8.	"Harmful Belly"	3:56
9.	"Last Laugh"	4:07
10.	"Hypnotized"	4:10
11.	"Father Time"	3:51
12.	"So High"	3:38
13.	"Cheetum Street"	4:14

== Personnel ==
Blind Melon

- Travis Warren – lead vocals, acoustic guitar
- Christopher Thorn – rhythm guitar, lap steel, Wurlitzer electric piano
- Rogers Stevens – lead guitar, piano
- Brad Smith – bass, percussion, backing vocals
- Glen Graham – drums, percussion

Technical

- Brooks Byrd Graham, Danny Clinch, Heather Thorn – photography

== Charts ==
Chart (2008)	Peak position
US Billboard 200	133
