= Galaxie (song) =

Single by Blind Melon

from the album Soup
- Released: 1995
- Recorded: 1995
- Genre: Alternative rock, grunge
- Length: 2:52
- Label: Capitol
- Songwriters: Brad Smith, Shannon Hoon
- Producer: Andy Wallace

Blind Melon singles chronology
"Change" (1993)	"Galaxie" (1995)	"Toes Across the Floor" (1995)

"Galaxie" is a single by American rock band Blind Melon. It was originally recorded for their 1995 second studio album Soup.

== Background ==
The song uses the main subject matter of Blind Melon lead singer Shannon Hoon's 1963 Ford Galaxie to also explore the deeper themes of his first love and break-up. He had originally bought this car used in New Orleans, for rather cheap, as the doors wouldn't even open. The original title for the song was called "I'm a Freak," but Hoon hated the original lyrics and refused to sing them. During the recording sessions Hoon would get frustrated and drive around the city in the car. Glen Graham believes it was during one of these drives that Hoon came up with the final lyrics to the song. Hoon never confirmed this claim.

== Music video ==
The music video for "Galaxie" featured a cameo by Timothy Leary, and revolves around a 1967 Ford Galaxie, fitting the lyrics. The video is considered a haunting premonition of Hoon's overdose later in 1995: Hoon was on drugs while filming the video, and featured such an erratic behavior that scared the rest of the band - guitarist Christopher Thorn was quoted saying "I get nauseous when I see that video, just watching Shannon just disintegrate in front of your eyes...".

The video premiered on MTV's alternative rock program 120 Minutes on July 23, 1995.

== Track listing ==
1. "Galaxie" 2:52
2. "Wilt (Demo)" 2:30
3. "Car Seat (God's Presents)" 2:43
4. "Change" 3:41

a double exists

1. "Galaxie" 2:52
2. "2x4" 2:30
3. "Change" 3:41
4. "Galaxie" 2:52
5. "Wilt (Demo)" 2:30
6. "Car Seat (God's Presents)" 2:43

== Charts ==
Chart (1995)	Peak position
Australia (ARIA)	122
Canada Top Singles (RPM)	21
Canada Rock/Alternative (RPM)	8
New Zealand (Recorded Music NZ)	50
UK Singles Chart	37
Billboard Mainstream Rock Tracks	25
Billboard Modern Rock Tracks	8
