= Blind Melon (album) =

Studio album by Blind Melon
- Released: September 22, 1992
- Recorded: February–June 1992
- Studio: London Bridge (Seattle)
- Genre: Alternative rock
- Length: 55:18
- Label: Capitol
- Producers: Rick Parashar; Blind Melon

Blind Melon chronology
Blind Melon (1992)	Soup (1995)

Singles from Blind Melon
- 1. "Tones of Home" Released: 1992; 2. "No Rain" Released: 1993; 3. "I Wonder" Released: 1993; 4. "Change" Released: 1993

Blind Melon is the debut studio album by American rock band Blind Melon, released on September 22, 1992, through Capitol Records. "No Rain" became Blind Melon's breakthrough single.

== Background ==
In 1990, lead singer Shannon Hoon moved from Indiana to Los Angeles. Soon he met guitarist Rogers Stevens and bassist Brad Smith, both Mississippi natives who had come to Los Angeles a year earlier. They began playing together and then recruited a second guitarist, Christopher Thorn. The foursome then looked for a drummer in the local area, but months passed and their search was unsuccessful. Stevens and Smith eventually persuaded Glen Graham to come to Los Angeles and join the band.

After Blind Melon recorded a four-song demo called The Goodfoot Workshop, Capitol Records became interested and signed them in 1991 although they never released the band's demo as an EP. Blind Melon then collaborated with producer David Briggs to put together their first EP titled The Sippin' Time Sessions. However, the record was not released due to "slick and doctored" results that were unanticipated.

In late 1991, Blind Melon decided to leave Los Angeles to record its debut album since they felt the city did not reflect their music style. The band retreated to Chapel Hill, North Carolina, because of its "good music scene", however they could not find an affordable house big enough there for them and their equipment. The band eventually rented a house at 926 West Trinity Avenue in Durham, North Carolina.

== Production ==
Some recording sessions for the album took place at their Durham, North Carolina, residence, nicknamed the 'Sleepyhouse'. Thorn stated, "We rehearsed in the house and recorded in the house. We became a much better band in the house, and that's where we really developed our sound." However, Blind Melon recorded the bulk of the album with producer Rick Parashar (who had produced Pearl Jam's Ten) at London Bridge Studio in Seattle. The recording sessions for Blind Melon were completed in the spring of 1992.

Blind Melon's production is marked by the use of outdated amplifiers and other antiquated studio technology. Modern studio effects were not used in its production as the band wanted to create a pure and "intimate" sounding record. Hoon stated, "We all kind of liked the production that was on a lot of early Stones records, [where] whatever it is you're playing is what it's going to sound like."

On the album, Rogers Stevens's guitar playing is predominantly heard in the right channel, while Chris Thorn's is in the left.

=== Composition ===
The album's music style has been described as alternative, southern rock with a '70s retro-rock feel. Hoon's vocals on the record are high-pitched, and "scratchy" sounding. A couple of the songs on Blind Melon criticize religion. "Holyman" slams people who maintain that only their religious views are right, and "Dear Ol' Dad" is about Hoon's ex-girlfriend who left him because of religion. The song "Sleepyhouse" is a recollection of a time the band spent at their residence of the same name, and with friends at a yellow house in Chapel Hill, North Carolina. The lyrics to "Tones of Home" were written collaboratively.

=== Artwork ===
Blind Melon's cover art is based on a 1975 photograph of Georgia Graham, Glen Graham's younger sister, in a bee costume at a "long-ago" school play. “We were all sitting around in the living room and that picture just jumped out at us. Someone jokingly said, ‘That would make a great album cover.’ ” The cover art further inspired the concept of the 'Bee Girl' character in the band's video for "No Rain". Samuel Bayer, the video's director, selected Heather DeLoach for the 'Bee Girl' role because she looked similar to Graham's sister in the photograph.

In 2021, the band shared this comment by Glen Graham on Facebook: "This photo was taken around 1976 at Joe Cook Jr. High School auditorium in Columbus, MS during a Jazz/Tap/Ballet recital of 4-6 year olds conducted by Mrs. Betty Lott's English School of Dance. Blind Melon spent about six weeks in Columbus in the winter of '91 before moving to what we dubbed the Sleepy House in Durham, NC. During that time, Christopher Thorn spotted the photo in my parents house and suggested using it for the album cover."

== Critical reception ==
Professional ratings
Review scores
Source	Rating
AllMusic	4/5 stars
Christgau's Consumer Guide	C+
Collector's Guide to Heavy Metal	7/10
The Encyclopedia of Popular Music	4/5 stars
Entertainment Weekly	B+
The Rolling Stone Album Guide	2/5 stars

Rolling Stone noted that "influences from the '70s abound, from Shannon Hoon's sunny Steve Miller-style vocals to tempo shifts of Jethro Tull-ish trickiness and whole pastures for jamming, jamming and jamming."

== Legacy and accolades ==
In 2022, Guitar World ranked Blind Melon No. 8 on their list of "The 30 greatest rock guitar albums of 1992".

== Track listing ==
All songs written by Blind Melon.

No.	Title	Length
1.	"Soak the Sin"	4:01
2.	"Tones of Home"	4:26
3.	"I Wonder"	5:31
4.	"Paper Scratcher"	3:14
5.	"Dear Ol' Dad"	3:02
6.	"Change"	3:41
7.	"No Rain"	3:37
8.	"Deserted"	4:20
9.	"Sleepyhouse"	4:29
10.	"Holyman"	4:47
11.	"Seed to a Tree"	3:29
12.	"Drive"	4:39
13.	"Time"	6:02

=== 20th anniversary edition ===
- Released April 16, 2013
- Includes bonus tracks from the previously unreleased Sippin' Time Sessions EP.

No.	Title	Length
14.	"Dear Ol' Dad"	3:03
15.	"Soul One"	3:41
16.	"Tones of Home"	4:51
17.	"Seed to a Tree"	3:25
18.	"Mother"	6:14

== Personnel ==
=== Blind Melon ===
- Shannon Hoon – vocals, acoustic guitar, tambourine
- Rogers Stevens – lead guitar
- Christopher Thorn – rhythm guitar, mandolin, harmonica
- Brad Smith – bass guitar, flute, backing vocals
- Glen Graham – drums, percussion

=== Additional Personnel ===
- Ustad Sabri Khan – sarangi on "Sleepyhouse"

Production

- Produced and mixed by Rick Parashar and Blind Melon
- Recorded by Rick Parashar; assisted by Jon Plum
- Mastered by George Marino
- Art direction by Shannon Hoon and Tommy Steele
- Photography by Heather Devlin

== Charts ==
=== Weekly charts ===
Chart (1993)	Peak position
Australian Albums (ARIA)	37
Austrian Albums (Ö3 Austria)	35
Canada Top Albums/CDs (RPM)	3
Dutch Albums (Album Top 100)	62
German Albums (Offizielle Top 100)	62
New Zealand Albums (RMNZ)	27
UK Albums (Official Charts)	53
US Billboard 200	3

=== Year-end charts ===
Chart (1993)	Position
Canada Top Albums/CDs (RPM)	16
US Billboard 200	45
Chart (1994)	Position
US Billboard 200	81

=== Singles ===
Year	Single	Chart	Peak position
1992	"Tones of Home"	US Billboard Modern Rock Tracks	20
1993	"No Rain"	US Billboard Mainstream Rock Tracks	1
1993	"No Rain"	US Billboard Modern Rock Tracks	1
1993	"No Rain"	US Billboard Hot 100	20
1993	"No Rain"	US Billboard Mainstream Top 40	4
1993	"Tones of Home"	US Billboard Mainstream Rock Tracks	10

== Certifications ==
Region	Certification	Certified units/sales
Canada (Music Canada)	4× Platinum	400,000^{^}
New Zealand (RMNZ)	Gold	7,500^{‡}
United Kingdom (BPI)	Silver	60,000^{^}
United States (RIAA)	4× Platinum	4,000,000^{^}
^{^} Shipments figures based on certification alone.^{‡} Sales+streaming figures based on certification alone.
