= Soup (Blind Melon album) =

Studio album by Blind Melon
- Released: August 15, 1995
- Recorded: November 1994 – January 1995
- Studios: Kingsway Studios, New Orleans; Ultrasonic Studios, New Orleans
- Genres: Alternative rock, Psychedelic rock, Folk rock
- Length: 48:14
- Label: Capitol
- Producer: Andy Wallace

Blind Melon chronology
Blind Melon (1992)	Soup (1995)	Nico (1996)

Singles from Soup
- 1. "Galaxie" Released: 1995; 2. "Toes Across the Floor" Released: 1995

Soup is the second studio album by American rock band Blind Melon, released on August 15, 1995, through Capitol Records. It is the band's last album released during the lifetime of vocalist Shannon Hoon.

Soup received generally mixed reviews from critics and fared poorly commercially, with the album only reaching number 28 on the US Billboard 200 albums chart and going on to sell 217,000 copies in the United States by October 1996. Hoon's death from a fatal drug overdose two months after the album's release resulted in the album's promotion being abruptly cut off, further affecting sales.

The album has retrospectively been considered a "dark horse" in the alternative rock genre.

== Background ==
Thematically, the album is much darker than Blind Melon's debut. "2 X 4" is about lead singer Shannon Hoon's experience at a drug detox, while the lyrics to the acoustic ballad "Walk" cryptically reference his addiction and attempts to recovery. "Skinned" is about murderer Ed Gein. "Car Seat (God's Presents)" is about Susan Smith, who killed her children by driving her car into a lake in Union, South Carolina. "St. Andrew's Fall" is about a suicide the band allegedly witnessed in Detroit on tour. When asked about "Mouthful of Cavities", Rogers Stevens said, "It's probably about the convoluted nooks and crannies of Shannon's brain." It featured harmonies between Hoon and Jena Kraus. "New Life" is about the birth of Hoon's daughter Nico Blue. "Wilt" is about halitosis. "Galaxie" uses the subject matter of Hoon's 1963 Ford Galaxie to also explore the deeper themes of his first love and break-up. "Lemonade" is a humorous song about a bar fight.

Being in New Orleans played a role in the sessions, as Hoon especially got consumed by the darker side of the city's nightlife. "We didn't really think to ourselves, 'Hey man, New Orleans is probably the worst place for us to be,'" guitarist Christopher Thorn told Grammy.com. "You can party 24/7 — the bars never close. You can get anything you want at any f**king time. In the moment, it felt romantic and it felt like exactly what we should be doing."

In a 2015 interview with the Songfacts website, Christopher Thorn explained how purchasing a variety of instruments led to the writing of certain songs on the album. "While writing songs for the Soup record, I was buying different instruments, and doing some songwriting experiments with them. I bought a banjo, so I wrote 'Skinned' just for fun. I never imagined Shannon would choose to write lyrics over that music. It was odd and really just so I could learn how to play banjo."

In a 2013 interview with Songfacts, Brad Smith recalled, "But Shannon, I think, meant every word that he said on the Soup record, and that's why it's maybe even more critically acclaimed than our first record. Our first record sold many, many more units than our second record, but the second record had a lot more critical acclaim to it. People recognize it as the truth and pure. And I think that's the earmark of a great record."

== Album cover ==
The producer of the album, Andy Wallace, is seen on the cover, eating alphabet soup. The letters in the soup spell out Blind Melon.

== Critical reception ==
Professional ratings
Review scores
Source	Rating
AllMusic	4/5 stars
Collector's Guide to Heavy Metal	8/10
Entertainment Weekly	D
Kerrang!	4/5 stars
Rock Hard	7.5/10
Rolling Stone	1.5/5 stars
The Rolling Stone Album Guide	1/5 stars
Spin	4/10

In issue 557 of Kerrang! (dated August 5, 1995), Paul Rees gave the album a "4 K review" (which means "Klassik"), saying, "Soup - bold, barmy, and borderline great."

In the August 21, 1995, issue of People, Andrew Abrahams gave the album a somewhat positive review, saying, "If Blind Melon's eclectic approach sounds a bit maddening, it can be. But at least they've accomplished an important task: establishing a musical life beyond the Bee Girl."

In issue 716 of Rolling Stone (dated September 7, 1995), Ted Drozdowski gave a scathing review of the album, ending his write-up with the statement, "With such slight fare to offer – and no kid in a bee suit – Soup puts Blind Melon in hot water."

Also in 1995, Soup was ranked number 13 in Kerrang! magazine's "Albums of the Year" list, above releases by the likes of Alice in Chains, Faith No More, Green Day, Ozzy Osbourne, and AC/DC.

Chart-wise, Soup fared best in Canada, where it held the No. 14 spot on the RPM Weekly chart for the weeks of September 18 & 25, 1995.

Soup was nominated for Best Recording Package - Boxed at the 38th Annual Grammy Awards.

== Legacy ==
In 2005, Soup was ranked number 357 in Rock Hard magazine's book The 500 Greatest Rock & Metal Albums of All Time. In the book, Andreas Himmelstein called Soup "a beautiful album filled with magical melodies that has completely undeservedly disappeared from the focus of the rock world."

In the 2009 book, A Devil on One Shoulder and an Angel on the Other: The Story of Shannon Hoon and Blind Melon, drummer Glen Graham is quoted as saying, "I talked to a guy from Spain yesterday [from Popular 1 Magazine], and he was saying, "Soup is the top album of the '90s according to our readers.' It was like, 'What?'"

In 2014, Soup came in at the No. 1 on the "Top 10 Underrated 90's Alternative Rock Albums" list for the Alternative Nation site.

The album took the number five spot on a "Top 10 Most Overlooked and Underrated Albums of the 90s" on the V+C website and was placed number 43 on the "50 Best Alternative Albums of the '90s" list on the Metro Weekly site.

On January 17, 2017, Soup was reissued on limited edition vinyl via Analog Sparks (cut from the original stereo tapes and pressed on 180-gram vinyl).

In an interview with the Long Island Pulse website in 2018, Thorn discussed why he feels the album has developed a cult following over the years. "It's crazy. Twenty years later, I feel finally validated. We felt like it was such a great record when it originally came out. For it to be slammed so hard, a record we were so proud of, was confusing to us. It was like, 'What? I thought we did a good job.' I get that it was dark and it was different than the first record, but in the end, it really grew on people. And more importantly, it has a great shelf life because people are not over it. I’m really flattered that people still care about that record."

In 2020, the Grammy site posted an article entitled How Blind Melon Lost Their Minds & Made A Masterpiece: 'Soup' Turns 25, that stated "Soup has quietly become a dark-horse favorite of the alt-rock era among fans and critics."

== Planned live performance ==
In the aforementioned interview with Songfacts in 2015, Thorn spoke about plans for the band to perform the Soup album in its entirety, for the first time ever. "To celebrate the 20-year anniversary of the Soup record, Blind Melon is making plans to go play shows and perform the Soup record from top to bottom. We have never done that before, but we are excited to challenge ourselves. Some of the songs from the Soup record have never been performed live before." These performances of the entire album have never taken place.

== Track listing ==
All songs written by Blind Melon.

No.	Title	Length
0.	"(untitled hidden track)"	2:05
1.	"Hello, Goodbye [50-second unlisted track] / Galaxie"	3:31
2.	"2x4"	4:00
3.	"Vernie"	3:14
4.	"Skinned"	1:57
5.	"Toes Across the Floor"	3:04
6.	"Walk"	2:47
7.	"Dumptruck"	3:40
8.	"Car Seat (God's Presents)"	2:42
9.	"Wilt"	2:29
10.	"The Duke"	3:36
11.	"St. Andrew's Fall"	4:11
12.	"New Life"	3:34
13.	"Mouthful of Cavities"	3:33
14.	"Lemonade"	3:36
Total length:		48:14

- In addition to containing the hidden track "Hello, Goodbye", there is an additional hidden track in the pregap of the CD. To hear this track, listeners must stick the CD in their player, and as soon as track one begins, rewind the track to go into the negative pregap of a CD contained before index 01 in the CD's table of contents. In addition to being in the pregap, the vocals are also backmasked, while the instruments are normal. This track acts as an overture, containing elements of the song "New Life".

== Personnel ==
Adapted credits from the liner notes of Soup.

Blind Melon

- Shannon Hoon – vocals, guitar, harmonica, kazoo
- Brad Smith – bass guitar, double bass, flute
- Christopher Thorn – rhythm guitar, mandolin, banjo
- Rogers Stevens – lead guitar, piano, Hammond organ
- Glen Graham – drums, percussion

Additional musicians

- Jena Kraus – backing vocals on "Mouthful of Cavities"
- Miles Tackett – cello on "Car Seat" and "St. Andrew's Fall"
- Michael Kelsey - guitar on "Untitled Hidden Track"

Production

- Steve Sisco – mixing assistant
- Andy Wallace – producer, engineer

== Charts ==
=== Album ===
Chart (1995)	Peak position
Australian Albums (ARIA)	74
Austrian Albums (Ö3 Austria)	44
Canada Top Albums/CDs (RPM)	14
Dutch Albums (Album Top 100)	87
Finnish Albums (Suomen virallinen lista)	33
New Zealand Albums (RMNZ)	34
Swedish Albums (Sverigetopplistan)	40
UK Albums (Official Charts)	48
US Billboard 200	28

=== Singles ===
Year	Single	Chart	Position
1995	"Galaxie"	Mainstream Rock Tracks	25
1995	"Galaxie"	Modern Rock Tracks	8

== Certifications ==
Region	Certification	Certified units/sales
Canada (Music Canada)	Gold	50,000^{^}
^{^} Shipments figures based on certification alone.
