= Blind Melon =

American rock band

- Blind Melon in 1993

Background information
- Origin: Los Angeles, California, U.S.
- Genres: Alternative rock
- Years active: 1990–1999; 2006–2008; 2010–present
- Labels: EMI; Capitol
- Spinoffs: Unified Theory
- Members: Rogers Stevens; Christopher Thorn; Glen Graham; Travis Warren; Nathan Towne
- Past members: Shannon Hoon; Brad Smith
- Website: blindmelon.com

Blind Melon is an American rock band formed in 1990 in Los Angeles, California. The band consists of guitarists Rogers Stevens and Christopher Thorn, drummer Glen Graham, vocalist Travis Warren and bassist Nathan Towne. They are best known for their 1993 hit "No Rain", and enjoyed critical and commercial success in the early 1990s with their neo-psychedelic take on alternative rock. The band has sold over 3.2 million albums in the United States as of 2008.

Blind Melon released two albums on Capitol Records – Blind Melon (1992) and Soup (1995) – before their original lead vocalist Shannon Hoon died of a drug overdose on the band's tour bus in New Orleans on October 21, 1995. After four years of unsuccessfully searching for a replacement for Hoon, Blind Melon dissolved in 1999. The remaining members reformed the band in 2006 with Travis Warren and recorded one album with him, For My Friends (2008). Shortly after its release, Warren left Blind Melon but returned in 2010, when the band returned to performing occasional gigs. The group has been nominated for four Grammy Awards.

== History ==
=== Formation, debut album, and success (1990–1993) ===
Blind Melon formed in Los Angeles in March 1990 after West Point, Mississippi, transplants Rogers Stevens and Brad Smith, a guitarist and bassist respectively, met vocalist Shannon Hoon, a native of Lafayette, Indiana. Guitarist Christopher Thorn, originally from Pennsylvania, was added shortly thereafter; the four eventually convinced drummer Glen Graham to relocate from Mississippi to complete the group after failing to find a drummer in Los Angeles. Their moniker derived from a nickname Smith's father had used to describe hippies. There is also a Cheech & Chong character named Blind Melon Chitlin', who is a parody of the 1920s blues musician Blind Lemon Jefferson.

The band debuted with a four-song demo, The Goodfoot Workshop, in 1991. Capitol Records A&R executive Tim Devine signed Blind Melon later that year and oversaw sessions with famed producer David Briggs for an unreleased EP to be titled The Sippin' Time Sessions. The recordings were abandoned due to the band's dissatisfaction with the production quality, which they felt resulted in "slick and doctored" results. Hoon's friendship and association with Guns N' Roses frontman Axl Rose accrued additional industry attention for the group, as he provided backing vocals on several Guns N' Roses tracks on 1991's Use Your Illusion I and II albums, including the single "Don't Cry". Blind Melon embarked upon a tour supporting Soundgarden late that year.

At drummer Glen Graham's suggestion, the band relocated to Durham, North Carolina, while beginning work on what would become their self-titled debut album with producer Rick Parashar, known for producing Pearl Jam's Ten. Sessions were held in London Bridge Studio in Seattle, Washington, and the album was recorded mostly live with minimal overdubs. The record was released in September 1992, and initially sold poorly behind its lead singles, "Tones of Home" and "No Rain", until the latter became an MTV staple the following July. Featuring Heather DeLoach playing the "Bee Girl", the video for "No Rain" helped the band achieve international recognition. The fourth single, "Change", also charted in Australia, Canada, and the UK. The album eventually attained quadruple-platinum status, debuting in the Billboard top 40 on October 9, 1993.

=== Soup and Hoon's death (1993–1995) ===
The group toured extensively in support of their debut, performing dates in Europe and Mexico and supporting such acts as Neil Young and Lenny Kravitz late in 1993. Their activity the following year included a performance at Woodstock '94 in August and a supporting slot on the Rolling Stones' Voodoo Lounge Tour thereafter. Amidst rising success, the band began to experience personal and legal problems related to drug and alcohol abuse, leading to multiple stints in drug rehabilitation for Hoon.

In 1994, the members relocated to New Orleans, Louisiana, to begin work on their second album, Soup, with producer Andy Wallace. The album was released in 1995, and featured predominantly shorter songs with a less conventional alternative rock approach, including New Orleans-style jazz and a hodgepodge of instrumentation throughout, such as horn sections and mandolin/banjo tracks. The lyrics to "St. Andrew's Fall" referenced a suicide jump, "Skinned" spoke about the life of Ed Gein, and "New Life" addressed the forthcoming birth of Hoon's child. "Mouthful of Cavities" featured backing vocals from Jena Kraus, who subsequently recorded a solo record with Thorn and Smith. Despite the debut of the lead single, "Galaxie", at number 25 on the Billboard chart, Soup ultimately failed to meet sales expectations.

Later that year, Blind Melon contributed a version of the song "Out on the Tiles" to the Encomium tribute album to Led Zeppelin, and cover of the Schoolhouse Rock! song "Three Is a Magic Number" to the Schoolhouse Rock! Rocks compilation. Their version of "Three Is a Magic Number", although never a charting single, became a fan favorite and featured in the films Never Been Kissed, Slackers, and You, Me and Dupree. All Music Guide reviewer Theresa E. LaVeck has praised the tune's "'70s feel-good vibe" and "rolling jam-band rhythms".

Against the advice of Hoon's drug counselor, Blind Melon went on tour in support of Soup. The band initially employed a counselor to assist Hoon's rehabilitation, but this attendant was soon dismissed. After several weeks on the road, Hoon was found dead on the band's tour bus of a heart attack caused by a cocaine overdose, on October 21, 1995, in Uptown New Orleans.

=== Aftermath and breakup (1995–1999) ===
The surviving members opted to continue their collaboration and recruit a new vocalist, although it would ultimately take them over a decade to do so. In 1996, they issued Nico, an album of outtakes and demos named for Hoon's daughter, who was only 13 weeks old when her father died. Nico contained unreleased songs from the Soup recording sessions, as well as several songs recorded with only partial instrumentation. The closing track, "Letters from a Porcupine", was recorded as a telephone message left by Hoon on Thorn's answering machine. The album also included covers of Steppenwolf and John Lennon songs. Its profits went to a program that helps musicians with drug and alcohol addiction.

Discussing his loss with The Guardian, Gia DeSantis, former KROQ DJ, producer and host at KDOC and head of video promotion at Capitol Records who worked with the band, said "Shannon had a magnetism. You couldn't take your eyes off him. They knew to bring in a new singer to sing his lyrics would not have had the same magnetism." She also mentions that "the band knew its chapter was closed following Hoon's death because he had become the public face of their music through their videos, particularly the one for No Rain" a video that made VH1's list of Top 100 Music Videos of All Time.

During this period, the relationships between the band members disintegrated as they attempted to recruit a new frontman. After failing to find a replacement for Hoon, Blind Melon officially dissolved their partnership on March 4, 1999, and the various members went on to other projects, including Thorn and Smith's activity in Unified Theory, a group they had founded the previous year.

=== Inactivity (1999–2006) ===
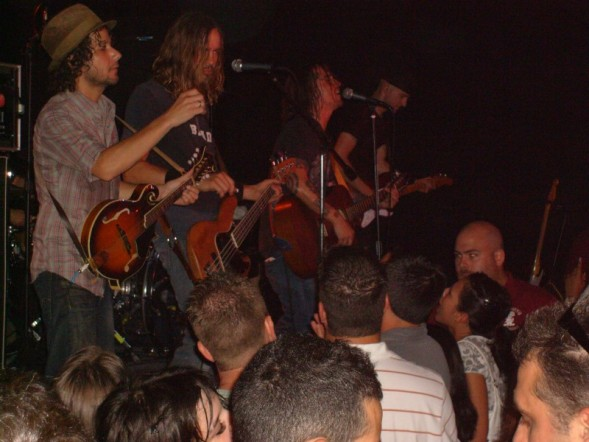
Blind Melon live in New York, 2008 (L–R: Christopher Thorn, Brad Smith, Travis Warren, Rogers Stevens)

In 2002, Capitol Records released a Classic Masters CD showcasing twelve Blind Melon songs. Thanks to stronger-than-expected sales, the band released The Best of Blind Melon in 2005, a CD–DVD package that features Blind Melon performing live from a September 1995 concert in Chicago. On December 15, 2006, a tribute album to Blind Melon was released by Yakmusic in New Zealand featuring bands from all over the world. In April 2006, Capitol Records released the Live at the Palace CD.

=== Reunion and For My Friends (2006–2008) ===
Blind Melon announced their reformation on September 15, 2006, which included the addition of new lead singer Travis Warren (formerly of Rain Fur Rent). Three new Blind Melon songs – "Make a Difference", "For My Friends" and "Harmful Belly" – followed on November 9. On October 7, 2007, they performed their first live concert in twelve years in Providence, Rhode Island.

"Wishing Well", the first single from the group's upcoming third studio album, was released on March 4, 2008, to coincide with a U.S. tour. The album, For My Friends, was released on April 22, 2008, on Adrenaline Records. On September 17, 2008, the biography A Devil on One Shoulder and an Angel on the Other: The Story of Shannon Hoon and Blind Melon by Greg Prato was published. European tour dates followed thereafter.

On November 6, 2008, the band announced the departure of Warren, despite having unfulfilled concert dates. Initially, the band intended to honor their remaining dates, and announced Chris Shinn of Unified Theory as lead vocalist for the remainder of their tour. However, this was later retracted, and the tour canceled. Warren ultimately returned to perform a previously scheduled gig with Blind Melon on December 31, 2008, in Dearborn, Michigan, which was announced as his final show.

=== Hiatus (2009–2010) ===
Capitol Records released the four-track EP "Deep Cuts" in April 2009 as a digital download. The members remained active with other projects: Smith and Thorn played with Codename Mike, while Smith also toured with Revis as a guest member and Thorn played briefly with Awolnation. Graham formed the band Jakeleg with his long-time friend Joe Tullos.

=== Second reformation and new album (2010–present) ===
On November 2, 2010, Blind Melon announced its reformation and Warren's return. Their first performance came November 27, when they played a free concert at the base of Aspen Mountain in Aspen, Colorado. They continued sporadic performances over the coming months, opening for Candlebox at The Hard Rock Hotel in Albuquerque, New Mexico, on February 4, 2011, and headlining Rest Fest at Crumland Farms, Frederick, Maryland, on September 5.

In 2012 they toured South America, with dates in Chile and Argentina, and Western Europe thereafter. On the status of the group, Graham stated late that year that "Blind Melon is still a functioning entity; Travis Warren is our current vocalist as he has been since 2007; however, we are only doing the occasional one-off and currently have no plans to record full length CDs."

To cap 2015, the band played back-to-back shows on New Year's Eve and New Year's Day at Lafayette Theater in Lafayette, Indiana, with Shannon Hoon's mother present. Nico Blue, Hoon's daughter, took the stage to sing the song "Change."

By 2018, Blind Melon had spent the last couple years working on new material for the follow-up to For My Friends. In a July 2018 interview on Consequence of Sound's "Kyle Meredith With ..." podcast, guitarist Christopher Thorn stated, "I've been mixing the new single or the new song, I could say ... the new song for the next Blind Melon record. We've been writing a bunch, and we have a song and a video done, so we just mixed the new song last night actually." Thorn also revealed that the band had been tracking some eight songs for the album since last December at his studio in Silver Lake, but added that there was no date set for release.

A documentary about Hoon titled All I Can Say (composed mostly of footage he shot on a handheld camera from 1990 to 1995) premiered at the Tribeca Film Festival on April 26, 2019, and was released on June 26, 2020, on online streaming platforms. It was later released on DVD and Blu-ray on November 24, 2020.

In September 2019, Blind Melon released their first song in 11 years "Way Down And Far Below". Thorn stated that the band was expected to release their fourth studio album in 2020; however, in an interview with Guitar World in February 2021, when asked about the state of the fourth studio album, Stevens said "We're going to release singles every couple of months, and then when there are 10-12 of them, we're going to press vinyl and sell it to whoever wants it," while when Thorn was asked if the plan was to release the album by year's end, he replied, "We've got to get a record out this year. For sure."

On November 1, 2021, author Greg Prato issued a follow-up book to A Devil on One Shoulder and an Angel on the Other, simply titled Shannon, and featured all-new interviews with either people who knew Shannon or were admirers of his music (plus a "roundtable discussion" with Stevens and Thorn).

In 2025, the band played their first show in six years, when they played the Genesee Theatre, Waukegan, Illinois on February 15, followed by shows throughout the year.

== Band members ==
Current members

- Rogers Stevens – lead guitar (1990–1999, 2006–present)
- Christopher Thorn – rhythm guitar (1990–1999, 2006–present)
- Glen Graham – drums (1990–1999, 2006–present)
- Travis Warren – lead vocals, acoustic guitar (2006–2008, 2010–present)
- Nathan Towne – bass, backing vocals (2017–present)

Former members

- Shannon Hoon – lead vocals, acoustic guitar, percussion (1990–1995; died 1995)
- Brad Smith – bass, backing vocals (1990–1999, 2006–2016)

Timeline

== Discography ==
Studio albums

- Blind Melon (1992)
- Soup (1995)
- For My Friends (2008)

== See also ==
- List of alternative rock artists
- List of deaths from drug overdose and intoxication
