= No Rain =

1993 single by Blind Melon

- US CD maxi-single

Single by Blind Melon

from the album Blind Melon
- B-side: "Drive" (live); "Soak the Sin" (live)
- Released: 1993
- Studio: London Bridge (Seattle, Washington)
- Genre: Alternative rock; neo-psychedelia; folk
- Length: 3:37
- Label: Capitol
- Songwriter: Blind Melon
- Producers: Rick Parashar; Blind Melon

Blind Melon singles chronology
"Tones of Home" (1992)	"No Rain" (1993)	"I Wonder" (1993)

Music video
- "No Rain" on YouTube

"No Rain" is a song by American rock band Blind Melon. It was released in 1993 as the second single from the band's debut album Blind Melon (1992). The song is well known for its accompanying music video, which features the "Bee Girl" character. The music video, directed by Samuel Bayer, received heavy airplay on MTV at the time of its release. It subsequently helped propel Blind Melon to multi-platinum status.

The song is the band's highest-charting song, reaching number 20 on the US Billboard Hot 100 and number one on both the Billboard Album Rock Tracks and Modern Rock Tracks charts. It proved to be successful internationally, peaking at number one in Canada and number eight in Australia.

== Synopsis ==
Although the song is credited to the whole band, bassist Brad Smith wrote most of "No Rain". He said: "The song is about not being able to get out of bed and find excuses to face the day when you have really, in a way, nothing." At the time, Smith had been dating a depressed woman who slept through sunny days and complained when it did not rain. For a while, he told himself that he was writing the song from her perspective, and later realized that he was also writing it about himself.

== Music video ==
The music video, directed by Samuel Bayer, stars Heather DeLoach as the "Bee Girl", a young tap dancer wearing a homemade bee costume and large glasses, modeled after the Blind Melon album cover: a family picture of Georgia Graham, younger sister of drummer Glen Graham. The Bee Girl's story is intercut with footage of Blind Melon performing in a field against a clear blue sky.

It opens on the girl's tap routine; the audience responds with mocking laughter, and the girl runs off-stage in tears. As the song plays, she wanders through Los Angeles, stopping to perform her dance for whoever will watch, but she still feels alone. Ultimately, at the point in the song where the word "escape" is repeated, she peeks through a gate, which elicits a look of astonishment on her face, then runs through it to join a group of "bee people" just like her, dancing joyfully in a green field.

As a result of the video, DeLoach appeared at the 1993 MTV Video Music Awards doing her "Bee Girl" dance to close the show, and also appeared as the "Bee Girl" in the video for "Weird Al" Yankovic's song "Bedrock Anthem".

== Reception ==
Pitchfork described the song as "a playfully jingle-jangle riff that feels strummed from a hammock, a beguiling falsetto vocal from wildly charismatic frontman Shannon Hoon, a sweet and mournful lyric about watching the world go by that doesn't sound depressed even though it literally describes depression."

== Track listings ==
US maxi-CD single (1993) and Australian CD single (1993)

1. "No Rain" (LP version)
2. "No Rain" (live)
3. "Drive" (live)
4. "Soak the Sin" (live)

US cassette single (1993)

1. "No Rain" (LP version) – 3:15
2. "No Rain" (live) – 6:00
3. "Soak the Sin" (live) – 3:50

French maxi-CD single (1993)

1. "No Rain (live) – 5:25
2. "Candy Says" (Country Jellyfish version) – 3:29
3. "Paper Scratcher" (acoustic version) – 3:10
4. "Tones of Home" (remix) – 4:29

European CD single (1993)

1. "No Rain" (LP version)
2. "Paper Scratcher" (Board mix)

UK CD and 12-inch single (1993)

1. "No Rain" (LP version)
2. "Soak the Sin" (Board mix)
3. "Paper Scratcher" (Board mix)
4. "Deserted" (Board mix)

UK 7-inch and cassette single (1993)

1. "No Rain" (LP version) – 3:15
2. "No Bidness" (Triple Vision version)
3. "I Wonder" (LP version)
- "No Bidness" was recorded live at Bogart's, Cincinnati, Ohio, on August 11, 1993

== Charts ==
=== Weekly charts ===
Chart (1993–1994)	Peak position
Australia (ARIA)	8
Austria (Ö3 Austria Top 40)	29
Belgium (Ultratop 50 Flanders)	31
Canada Top Singles (RPM)	1
Europe (Eurochart Hot 100)	53
Germany (GfK)	76
Iceland (Íslenski Listinn Topp 40)	21
Ireland (IRMA)	24
Netherlands (Dutch Top 40)	26
Netherlands (Single Top 100)	22
New Zealand (Recorded Music NZ)	15
UK Singles (Official Charts)	17
US Billboard Hot 100	20
US Album Rock Tracks (Billboard)	1
US Modern Rock Tracks (Billboard)	1
US Top 40/Mainstream (Billboard)	4
US Cash Box Top 100	17

=== Year-end charts ===
Chart (1993)	Position
Australia (ARIA)	85
Canada Top Singles (RPM)	17
US Album Rock Tracks (Billboard)	10
US Modern Rock Tracks (Billboard)	2

Chart (1994)	Position
Australia (ARIA)	85

== Certifications ==
Region	Certification	Certified units/sales
Australia (ARIA)	Gold	35,000^{^}
United Kingdom (BPI)	Silver	200,000^{‡}
^{^} Shipments figures based on certification alone.^{‡} Sales+streaming figures based on certification alone.

== Release history ==
Region	Date	Format(s)	Label(s)	Ref.
United States	1993	CD maxi-single; cassette	Capitol	
Australia	November 1, 1993	CD; cassette	Capitol	
United Kingdom	November 29, 1993	7-inch vinyl; 12-inch vinyl; CD; cassette	Capitol	

== See also ==
- List of RPM number-one singles of 1993
- List of Billboard Mainstream Rock number-one songs of the 1990s
- Number one modern rock hits of 1993
