= Shannon Hoon =

American singer-songwriter (1967–1995)

- Shannon Hoon performing with Blind Melon in 1994

Background information
- Born: Richard Shannon Hoon; September 26, 1967; Lafayette, Indiana, U.S.
- Died: October 21, 1995 (aged 28) New Orleans, Louisiana, U.S.
- Genres: Alternative rock; grunge; neo-psychedelia; folk rock; psychedelic rock; stoner rock
- Occupations: Singer-songwriter, musician
- Instruments: Vocals; guitar; harmonica; percussion; kazoo
- Years active: 1985–1995
- Label: Capitol
- Formerly of: Blind Melon; Guns N' Roses; Styff Kytten
- Website: shannonhoon.com

Richard Shannon Hoon (September 26, 1967 – October 21, 1995) was an American singer-songwriter and musician. He was the lead singer of the band Blind Melon from 1990 until his death in 1995.

== Early life ==
Richard Shannon Hoon was born on September 26, 1967, in Lafayette, Indiana. He was raised in the nearby town of Dayton, Indiana, with his older half-sister, Anna and older half-brother, Tim. His father, Dick Hoon, was a bricklayer and his mother, Nel Hoon, was a manager of a bar in Dayton.

In high school, he played football, wrestled, and was a pole vaulter. Shannon's musical influences included the Grateful Dead, The Beatles, John Lennon, and Bob Dylan. After graduating from McCutcheon High School in 1985, Hoon joined a local glam metal band named Styff Kytten, which also featured guitarist Michael Kelsey, bassist Brian Bundy and drummer Barry Koch. He took on the role of frontman and lead singer of the band. It was around this time that he wrote his first song and called it "Change".

== Blind Melon ==
In 1990, Hoon left Indiana for Los Angeles. In Los Angeles, he met musicians Brad Smith and Rogers Stevens at a party. Smith and Stevens saw Hoon perform his song "Change" acoustically and invited Hoon to play with them. Christopher Thorn and Glen Graham were then brought into the fold, and later that year the five musicians decided to form Blind Melon. The band was possibly named for a term Smith's father used to describe the neighborhood stoners; or for Blind Melon Chitlin, a character from a Cheech & Chong album. In 1990, the new bandmates produced a four-song demo tape and subsequently signed a $500,000 recording contract with Capitol Records.

In Los Angeles, Hoon befriended his sister Anna's high school friend Axl Rose, also a native of Lafayette, Indiana. Rose invited Hoon to join him in the studio where his band Guns N' Roses were recording their albums Use Your Illusion I and Use Your Illusion II (both released in 1991). Hoon sang backing vocals on several tracks, including "The Garden" and "Don't Cry". Rose also invited Hoon to appear in the video for "Don't Cry".

In 1992, Blind Melon released their self-titled debut album produced by Pearl Jam producer Rick Parashar. Blind Melon began touring to promote the album, supporting and opening for acts like BAD II, PiL, Ozzy Osbourne, Guns N' Roses, and Soundgarden over the course of 1992–1993. In the summer of 1993, the video for the album track "No Rain" was released as a single and featured a young girl, played by Heather DeLoach, in a bee costume, tap-dancing to unappreciative audiences. Blind Melon went multi-platinum.

Hoon and Blind Melon spent the next two years touring. In 1993, Hoon was arrested for indecent exposure after he undressed onstage and urinated on a fan at a show in Vancouver.

In 1994, Blind Melon appeared at Woodstock '94, where Hoon, allegedly high on LSD, went onstage wearing his girlfriend's white dress.

After taking a hiatus from touring, Blind Melon returned to the studio to record the album Soup in New Orleans. Soup was released in 1995.

== Personal life and death ==
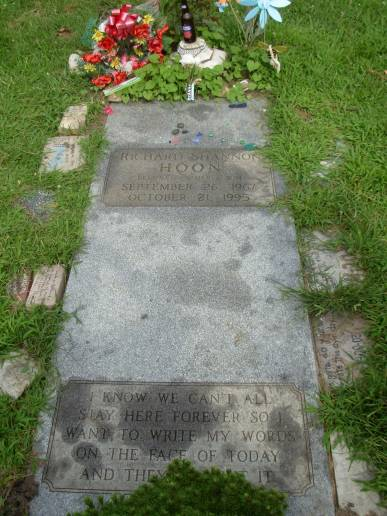
Gravesite of Shannon Hoon

Hoon entered a substance abuse rehabilitation facility in May 1994 and again in June 1995. On July 11, 1995, Hoon and his girlfriend, Lisa Crouse, had a daughter named Nico Blue.

In August, Blind Melon planned a tour to support their album Soup. A counselor was hired to accompany Hoon on the tour, but was let go after the first week.

After a performance at Numbers club in Houston on October 20, Hoon undertook an all-night drug binge. The next day, Blind Melon was scheduled to play a show in New Orleans at Tipitina's. The band's sound engineer, Lyle Eaves, went to the tour bus to awaken Hoon for a sound check, but Hoon was unresponsive. An ambulance arrived, and Hoon was pronounced dead at the scene at the age of 28. His death was attributed to a cocaine overdose.

Hoon is buried at Dayton Cemetery in Dayton, Indiana. His grave is inscribed with a line from Blind Melon's song "Change", the first song he wrote:

I know we can't all stay here forever So I want to write my words on the face of today and they'll paint it

== Aftermath and legacy ==
On November 12, 1996, Blind Melon released their final album featuring Hoon, Nico, as a tribute to him with all proceeds going to his daughter and to programs helping musicians deal with substance abuse. The band also released a video called "Letters from a Porcupine" that was nominated for Best Long Form Music Video at the Grammy Awards on February 25, 1997.

Blind Melon remained active for the next four years following Hoon's death. The remaining members had planned to continue the band in memory of him and held auditions for a singer; however, they never managed to find a permanent replacement, and Blind Melon officially disbanded in 1999. After years of refusing to perform together out of respect for Hoon, the surviving members reformed Blind Melon in 2006, with Travis Warren taking his place.

On September 15, 2018, photos of Hoon's final performance with Blind Melon at the Numbers club in Houston on October 20, 1995, the day before he died, were released for the first time by fan Zak Joshua Rose, who took the pictures and claimed that he hung out with the band members except Hoon (who had disappeared) after the show.

A documentary about Hoon titled All I Can Say (composed mostly of footage he shot on a handheld camera from 1990 to 1995) premiered at the Tribeca Film Festival on April 26, 2019, and was released on June 26, 2020, on online streaming platforms. Also, it was released on DVD and Blu-ray on November 24, 2020. Hoon was co-credited as a "director" of the film.

On November 1, 2021, author Greg Prato issued a follow-up book to A Devil on One Shoulder and an Angel on the Other, simply titled Shannon, and featured all-new interviews with either people who knew Shannon or were admirers of his music.

Since Hoon's death, various musical artists have mentioned him in song lyrics, including Dream Theater ("Just Let Me Breathe"), Sun Kil Moon ("Track Number 8"), and the Avett Brothers ("Smoke in Our Lights"), while others have written songs inspired by him, including Zakk Wylde ("Throwin' it All Away"), The Used ("Poetic Tragedy"), and Econoline Crush ("Sparkle and Shine"). A Scottish group, active from around 1998–2002, named themselves "The Sempiternal Hoon" in tribute to Shannon Hoon's influence on their sound.

== Bibliography ==
- Prato, Greg (2008). A Devil on One Shoulder and an Angel on the Other: The Story of Shannon Hoon and Blind Melon. Kindle. ISBN 978-0615252391.
- Prato, Greg (2021). Shannon. Kindle. ISBN 979-8452812739.
- Weitz, Brad (2012). From Your Friends – Art, Photos and Stories Inspired by Blind Melon. Lulu.
- Weitz, Brad/Mester, Csaba (2012). Sweet Meloncholy. Take On 1 or 2 / Garage Art. ISBN 978-0-615-74029-4.
