= Duff McKagan discography =

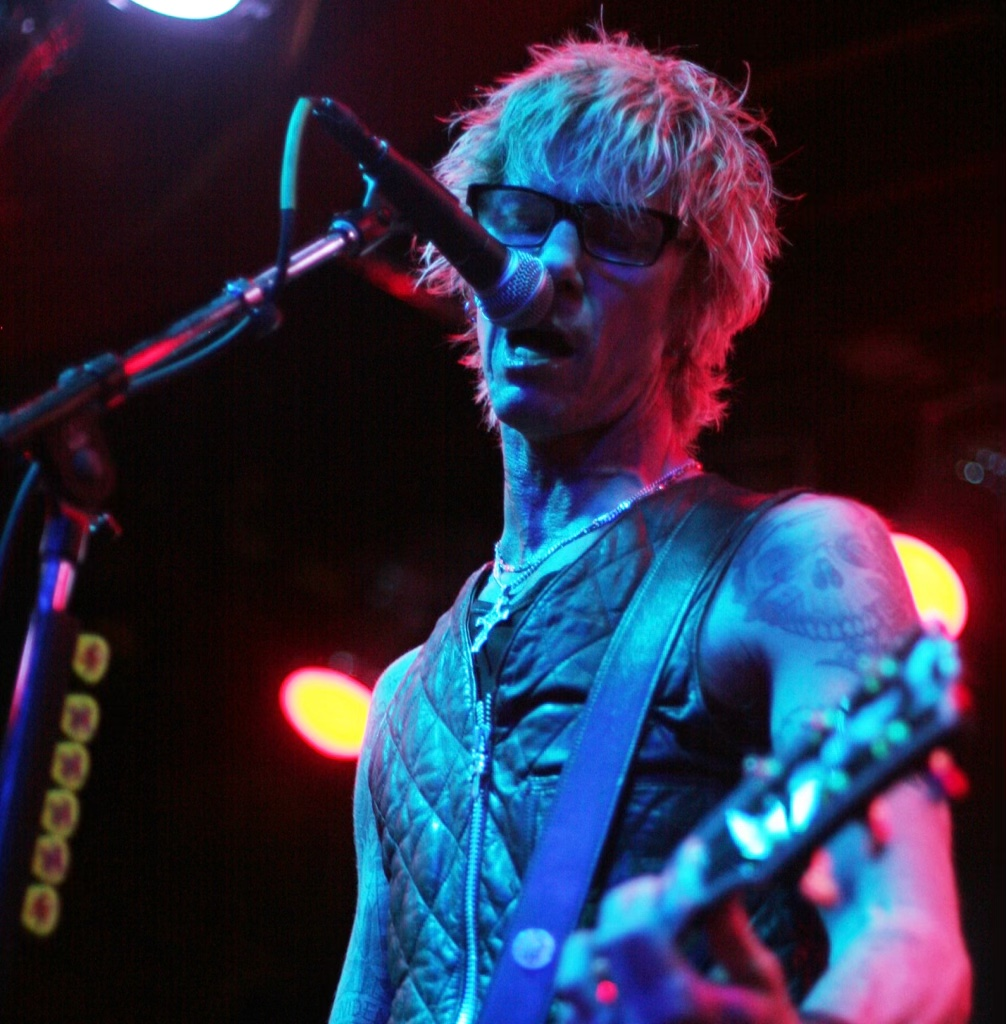
- Studio albums: 3
- Extended plays: 2
- Singles: 7

The discography of American rock musician Duff McKagan consists of three solo studio albums and four singles, with additional discography with different bands.

== Albums ==
=== Studio ===
Title	Album details	Peak chart positions							
Title	Album details	US	AUS	AUT	CAN	GER	SWE	SWI	UK
Believe in Me	Released: September 28, 1993; Label: Geffen; Format: CD	137	86	36	53	78	11	32	27
Tenderness	Released: May 31, 2019; Label: UMe; Format: CD, LP, DL	—	—	—	—	—	—	42	—
Lighthouse	Released: October 20, 2023; Label: BFD; Format: CD, LP, DL	—	—	—	—	—	—	—	—
"—" denotes releases that did not chart or were not released in that country.

=== Live ===
Title	Album details
Tenderness: Live in Los Angeles	Planned release date: May 31, 2024; Label: UMe; Format: CD, LP, DL

=== Unreleased ===
Title	Album details
Beautiful Disease	Planned release date: February 5, 1999; Label: Geffen; Format: CD

== EPs ==
Year	Title
2015	How to Be a Man
2023	This Is The Song

== Singles ==
Year	Single	Album
1993	"Believe in Me"	Believe in Me
2015	"How to Be a Man"	How to Be a Man EP
2019	"Tenderness"	Tenderness
2019	"Rattlesnake" (The Westies)	non album single

=== Promo singles ===
Year	Single	Album
1993	"Punk Rock Song"	Believe in Me
1993	"I Love You"	Believe in Me
1993	"Man in the Meadow"	Believe in Me
2019	"Chip Away"	Tenderness

== Other appearances ==
Studio

Year	Song	Album	Notes
1999	"Elected"	Humanary Stew: A Tribute to Alice Cooper	with Steve Jones, Billy Duffy, and Matt Sorum
2007	"Hope"	Collage: Our Gift of Music	Beautiful Disease outtake
2013	"Put Your Back"	Chrome Hearts Magazine, Vol. 6	Beautiful Disease outtake

Live

Year	Album	Notes
2015	KEXP Presents: Raw Power - A Tribute to Iggy & the Stooges	with Mark Arm, Barrett Martin, and Mike McCready

Guest

Year	Artist(s)	Album	Notes
1990	Iggy Pop	Brick by Brick	"Home" "Butt Town" "Pussy Power" "My Baby Wants to Rock and Roll"
1994	Gilby Clarke	Pawnshop Guitars	"Jail Guitar Doors"
1996	Teddy Andreadis	Innocent Loser	"Shotgun Shack"
1996	The Outpatience	Anxious Disease	
1998	Izzy Stradlin	117°	
1999	Izzy Stradlin	Ride On	
2000	Mark Lanegan	Free the West Memphis 3	"Untitled Lullaby"
2000	The Racketeers	Mad for the Racket	bass
2001	Zilch	Skyjin	"Give 'Em What You Got Given" "Make the Motherfuckers Wake Up" "Hide and Seek" "Absolute Zeroes"
2001	Mark Lanegan	Field Songs	"Fix"
2001	Izzy Stradlin	River	
2002	Izzy Stradlin	On Down the Road	
2002	Burden Brothers	Queen O' Spades	"Walk Away"
2002	Alien Crime Syndicate	XL from Coast to Coast	"Don't Go Breaking My Heart"
2004	Mark Lanegan	Bubblegum	"Strange Religion"
2008	Izzy Stradlin	Concrete	Three tracks, including "Concrete"
2010	Izzy Stradlin	Wave of Heat	Seven tracks
2010	Slash	Slash	"Watch This"
2010	Macy Gray	The Sellout	"Kissed It"
2010	Manic Street Preachers	Postcards from a Young Man	"A Billion Balconies Facing the Sun"
2011	Crosses	EP 1	"This Is a Trick"
2014	Crosses	Crosses	"This Is a Trick"
2014	Sebastian Bach	Give 'Em Hell	
2020	Ozzy Osbourne	Ordinary Man	bass, co-writer on "Straight to Hell", "All My Life", "Goodbye", "Ordinary Man", "Eat Me", "Scary Little Green Men", "Holy for Tonight"
2021	Nancy Wilson	You and Me	"Party at the Angel Ballroom"
2022	Darryl McDaniels	TBA	bass on "She Gets Me High"
2023	Iggy Pop	Every Loser	bass and co-writer on 3 tracks

== Band work ==
=== With Vains ===
Year	Title	Notes
1980	"School Jerks" b/w "The Fake" and "The Loser"	single labeled "You May Not Believe in Vains but You Cannot Deny Terror"

=== With Fastbacks ===
Single

Year	Title	Notes
1981	"It's Your Birthday" b/w "You Can't Be Happy"	single

Other appearance

Year	Title	Notes
1981	"Someone Else's Room"	from the various artists album Seattle Syndrome: Volume One

=== With 10 Minute Warning ===
Album

Year	Title
1998	10 Minute Warning

EP

Year	Title	Notes
1983	Survival of the Fittest	Released on cassette

=== With Guns N' Roses ===
Albums

Year	Title
1987	Appetite for Destruction
1988	GN'R Lies
1991	Use Your Illusion I
1991	Use Your Illusion II
1993	"The Spaghetti Incident?"

EPs

Year	Title
1986	Live ?!*@ Like a Suicide
1987	Live from the Jungle
1993	The Civil War EP
2022	Hard Skool EP

Singles

Year	Title	Album
2021	Absurd	non-album single
2021	Hard Skool	non-album single
2023	Perhaps / The General	non-album single
2025	Nothin'	non-album single
2025	Atlas	non-album single

Other appearance

Year	Title	Album	Notes
1994	Sympathy for the Devil	Interview with the Vampire	The Rolling Stones cover

=== With the Fartz ===
Year	Title	Notes
1990	You, We See You Crawling: Released: June 9, 1990; Label: Musical Tragedies; Formats: Vinyl, LP	compilation album featuring McKagan on five tracks recorded in 1982

=== With Walking Papers ===
Year	Title	Peak chart positions
Year	Title	US Heat
2013	Walking Papers: Released: August 6, 2013; Label: Sunyata	14
2018	WP2: Released: January 19, 2018; Label: Loud and Proud	17

=== With Kings of Chaos ===
Year	Song	Title	Notes
2014	"Never Before"	Re-Machined: A Tribute to Deep Purple's Machine Head	Deep Purple cover

=== With the Living ===
Year	Title	Notes
2021	1982	EP recorded in 1982, released digitally and on LP with the same record on both sides

=== With Max Creeps ===
Year	Title	Notes
2022	Nein	EP, McKagan credited as PC Bullshit

=== With Nando Reis & Os Infernais ===
Year	Title
2024	Uma Estrela Misteriosa Revelará o Segredo
