= Izzy Stradlin discography =

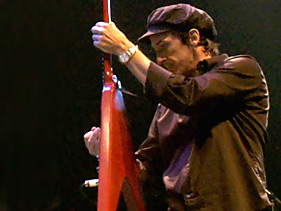
- Izzy Stradlin during a concert in 2006.
- Studio albums: 11
- Extended plays: 1
- Singles: 11

The discography of American musician Izzy Stradlin consists of 11 studio albums (including his work with Izzy Stradlin and the Ju Ju Hounds band), 1 extended play and 11 singles.

== Studio albums ==
=== Izzy Stradlin and the Ju Ju Hounds ===
Year	Album details	Peak chart positions							
Year	Album details	US	US CB	AUS	CAN	GER	FIN	SWE	UK
Izzy Stradlin and the Ju Ju Hounds
1992	Izzy Stradlin and the Ju Ju Hounds: Released: October 13, 1992; Label: Geffen; Formats: LP, CD, Cassette	102	62	42	70	78	28	32	52

=== Solo ===
Year	Album details
1998	117°: Released: March 9, 1998; Label: Geffen; Formats: CD, digital download
1999	Ride On: Released: December 1999; Label: Universal Victor; Formats: CD, digital download
2001	River: Released: May 2001; Label: Sanctuary; Formats: CD, digital download
2002	On Down the Road: Released: August 21, 2002; Label: JVC Victor; Formats: CD, digital download
2005	Like a Dog: Released: October 2005; Label: Self-released; Formats: CD, digital download
2007	Miami: Released: May 2007; Label: Self-released; Formats: Digital download
2007	Fire, the Acoustic Album: Released: November 2007; Label: Self-released; Formats: Digital download
2008	Concrete: Released: July 2008; Label: Self-released; Formats: Digital download
2009	Smoke: Released: December 2009; Label: Self-released; Formats: Digital download
2010	Wave of Heat: Released: July 2010; Label: Self-released; Formats: Digital download

== Extended plays ==
Year	EP details
1993	Izzy Stradlin and the Ju Ju Hounds Live: Released: July 21, 1993; Label: Geffen; Formats: CD

== Singles ==
=== Izzy Stradlin and the Ju Ju Hounds ===
Year	Single	Peak chart positions					Album
Year	Single	US Rock	AUS	CAN	SWE	UK	Album
1992	"Pressure Drop"	—	47	—	40	45	Izzy Stradlin and the Ju Ju Hounds
1992	"Shuffle It All"	6	117	54	—	—	Izzy Stradlin and the Ju Ju Hounds
1992	"Somebody Knockin'"	13	—	—	—	—	Izzy Stradlin and the Ju Ju Hounds
1993	"Train Tracks" (promo only)	—	—	—	—	—	Izzy Stradlin and the Ju Ju Hounds
"—" denotes releases that did not chart or were not released in that country.

=== Solo ===
Year	Single	Album
1998	"Ain't It a Bitch"	117°
1998	"117°" (promo only)	117°
2004	"Do You Love Me?" (Feat. Steven Adler)	Non-album single
2012	"Baby Rann"	Non-album single
2012	"Upside"	Non-album single
2016	"Walk´n Song"	Non-album single
2016	"F.P. Money"	Non-album single
2016	"To Being Alive"	Non-album single
2016	"Call Me the Breeze" (Feat. Lauren Barth & Jesse Aycock)	Non-album single

== Band work ==
=== With Guns N' Roses ===
Year	Album details	Peak chart positions										Certifications (sales thresholds)
Year	Album details	US	AUS	AUT	CAN	GER	IRE	NLD	SWE	SWI	UK	Certifications (sales thresholds)
1987	Appetite for Destruction: Released: July 21, 1987; Label: Geffen (#24148); Formats: CD, LP, CS	1	7	3	3	16	11	5	32	7	5	US: 18× Platinum; UK: 4× Platinum; GER: Platinum; CAN: Diamond
1988	G N' R Lies: Released: November 29, 1988; Label: Geffen (#24198); Formats: CD, LP, CS	2	18	10	13	37	—	14	7	15	22	US: 5× Platinum; UK: Gold; GER: Gold
1991	Use Your Illusion I: Released: September 17, 1991; Label: Geffen (#24415); Formats: CD, LP, CS	2	2	2	1	5	28	3	3	3	2	US: 7× Platinum; UK: Platinum; GER: 2× Platinum; CAN: Diamond
1991	Use Your Illusion II: Released: September 17, 1991; Label: Geffen (#24420); Formats: CD, LP, CS	1	1	1	1	3	29	2	4	2	1	US: 7× Platinum; UK: Platinum; GER: 5× Gold; CAN: 9× Platinum
"—" denotes releases that did not chart or were not released in that country.

=== With Hollywood Rose ===
==== Demos ====
Year	Album details
2004	The Roots of Guns N' Roses: Released: June 1, 2004; Label: Cleopatra; Formats:
