= Swamp Song =

Swamp Song may refer to:

== Entertainment ==
- "Swamp Song", a song by Duff McKagan from his 1993 album Believe in Me
- "Swamp Song", a song by progressive rock band Tool from their 1993 album Undertow
- "The Swamp Song", a song by Oasis from their 1995 single Wonderwall
- "Swamp Song", a song by Blur from their 1999 album 13
