= Think About You (Guns N' Roses song) =

Song by Guns N' Roses

from the album Appetite for Destruction
- Released: July 21, 1987
- Recorded: 1987
- Genre: Heavy metal
- Length: 3:50
- Label: Geffen
- Songwriter: Izzy Stradlin
- Producer: Mike Clink

"Think About You" is a song by the American rock band Guns N' Roses, featured on the band's debut studio album, Appetite for Destruction (1987). Although credited to the group, the song was primarily composed by rhythm guitarist, Izzy Stradlin, who also plays lead guitar on it.

== Background ==
By the time Guns N' Roses formed, Stradlin had already nearly completed writing and composing "Think About You." In a 1988 interview with Hit Parader, Izzy Stradlin, the song's main writer and composer, stated that the track was "a fast love song about drugs, sex, Hollywood, and money." Fans rumored that the song was about Stradlin's first time trying heroin, but Stradlin has neither officially confirmed nor denied the rumors. In another 1988 interview, Axl Rose confirmed that Stradlin was the song's main writer, although Rose made minor contributions and edits to the lyrics, stating, "There's a few parts of the lyrics that I put in there, and maybe gave it a little more flow, and worded it my way since I was the one singing it." Rose stated that the song borrowed its style and production from Hanoi Rocks, calling the song "kinda like a tribute".

In 2007, Slash expressed his distaste for "Think About You", saying he did not enjoy performing the song and believed it was "just too lightweight. But at the same time, it was one of those songs where Izzy had written the lyrics, so it was sort of like that Aerosmith song "Combination", which Joe Perry wrote. It was Izzy's babbling "Combination" song. I enjoyed recording it, though. I managed to get some ideas down and could walk away feeling satisfied with the way the song sounded."

== Reception ==
Tom Zutaut, an executive at Geffen Records, said in a 2017 interview with LA Weekly that his favorite track from Appetite for Destruction was "Think About You" and that he advocated for the song's inclusion on the album's Side Two. He also stated that it was his decision for the song to feature prominent "jangling" acoustic guitars in the chorus. Zutaut called the song "[the band's] greatest post punk-rock Rolling Stones moment."

== Live ==
"Think About You" was played very frequently during early Guns N' Roses shows in 1985 and 1986, a decision that Ultimate Classic Rock attributed to the band's lack of other material at the time. However, it was not played again until 2001. It was frequently played in 2002 and occasionally played in 2006, with former rhythm guitarist Izzy Stradlin joining the band for a few performances. It has not been performed since the 2009/2010 tour, but it was sound-checked ahead of a show in Mexico City in 2020.

"Think About You" is the second least-performed song from Appetite for Destruction, only behind "Anything Goes".

== Personnel ==
- W. Axl Rose – lead vocals
- Slash – lead and rhythm guitars, acoustic guitar
- Izzy Stradlin – rhythm and lead guitars, backing vocals
- Duff "Rose" McKagan – bass guitar
- Steven Adler – drums
