= 14 Years =

Promotional single by Guns N' Roses

from the album Use Your Illusion II
- Released: 1991
- Recorded: September 1990
- Studio: Record Plant (Los Angeles)
- Genre: Hard rock, blues rock, heavy metal
- Length: 4:16
- Label: Geffen
- Songwriters: Izzy Stradlin; Axl Rose
- Producers: Mike Clink; Guns N' Roses

"14 Years" is a song by the American rock band Guns N' Roses, released in 1991 on their album Use Your Illusion II.

== Background ==
The song is one of the few Guns N' Roses tunes sung almost entirely by Izzy Stradlin with Axl Rose singing the chorus.

"14 Years" was only performed live when Stradlin was still in the band. According to fan-site GNRsource, the song is about Rose's and Stradlin's friendship, with people pointing out that they had known each other for 14 years by the time the song was supposedly written.

An earlier demo had different lyrics with the first verse and the chorus slightly modified, while the second and third verses were given a complete makeover. Parts of the demo's second verse would be used in the third verse of the final version, while the third verse is a slightly modified version of the demo's first verse. Stradlin would sometimes change the lyrics a bit when singing the song live.

The song was part of the set list at a few live concerts in 2012 featuring Izzy Stradlin.

== Personnel ==
- W. Axl Rose – backing and co-lead vocals, piano
- Slash – lead guitar
- Izzy Stradlin – rhythm guitar, lead vocals
- Duff McKagan – bass, backing vocals
- Matt Sorum – drums
- Dizzy Reed – organ, (in the video, he's playing the piano)
