= Queen o' Spades =

Queen O' Spades

EP by Burden Brothers
- Released: December 20, 2002
- Genre: Rock and roll
- Length: 24:22
- Label: Last Beat
- Producer: Vaden Lewis and Taz Bentley

Burden Brothers chronology
8 Ball (2002)	Queen O' Spades (2002)	Buried in Your Black Heart (2003)

Queen O' Spades is an EP by the Burden Brothers. Their third release, the album was released in 2002 by Last Beat Records. The disc was sold in a package along with a t-shirt, shotglass, and stickers on the band's website. This EP features former Guns N' Roses members Izzy Stradlin and Duff McKagan and Pearl Jam drummer Matt Cameron.

== Track listing ==
1. "Walk Away" (Lewis, Bentley) – 2:56
2. "Queen O' Spades" (Lewis, Bentley) – 4:24
3. "400 Bucks" (Reverend Horton Heat) – 3:59
4. "Walk (Very Far) Away" (Lewis, Bentley) – 4:43
5. "Queen O' Spaces [Clean]" (Lewis, Bentley) – 4:25
6. "400 (More) Bucks" (Reverend Horton Heat) – 3:55

== Personnel ==
- Vaden Lewis - vocals and guitar
- Mike Rudnicki - guitar
- Mark Hughes - bass guitar
- Casey Orr - bass
- Joe Butcher - pedal steel guitar
- Zach Blair - guitar
- Josh Daugherty - guitar
- James Kirkland - guitar
- Taz Bentley - backing vocals, drums, percussion, and guitar
- Izzy Stradlin - guitar (on "Walk Away")
- Duff "Rose" McKagan - bass guitar (on "Walk Away")
- Matt Cameron - drums (on "Walk Away")
- Stuart Hallerman - engineer
- Paul Williams - engineer, mixing
