= Like a Dog =

Like a Dog may refer to:

- "Like a Dog" (song), a 2000 song by Powderfinger
- Like a Dog (album), a 2005 album by Izzy Stradlin
