= Cheer Up =

Cheer Up may refer to:

== Film, theatre and television ==
- Cheer Up, 1917 musical by John Raymond Hubbell
- Cheer Up (1924 film), American silent comedy directed by Stephen Roberts (director)
- Cheer Up (film), 1936 British comedy film directed by Leo Mittler
- Cheer Up! (TV series), a 2015 South Korean television series
- Cheer Up (South Korean TV series), a 2022 South Korean television series

== Music ==
- Cheer Up (Ray Anderson, Han Bennink and Christy Doran album), 1995
- Cheer Up (Plexi album) (1996)
- Cheer Up! (Reel Big Fish album), album by ska punk band Reel Big Fish
- "Cheer Up", a 1962 single by Kenny Roberts
- "Cheer Up", a 1964 song by Paul Anka
- "Cheer Up", song by Bob Marley and the Wailers from the album The Best of the Wailers
- "Cheer Up", a 2015 single by Hong Jin-young from Life Note
- "Cheer Up (song), a 2016 Korean-language song by South Korean girl group Twice from Page Two

== Other ==
- Cheer Up: Love and Pompoms, 2021 graphic novel by Crystal Frasier
- Cheer-Up Society, WWI servicemen's welfare organization in South Australia
