= Izzy Stradlin and the Ju Ju Hounds (album) =

Studio album by Izzy Stradlin
- Released: October 13, 1992
- Recorded: February–July 1992
- Studios: Total Access, Redondo Beach, California
- Genre: Rock
- Length: 43:30
- Label: Geffen
- Producers: Izzy Stradlin, Eddie Ashworth

Izzy Stradlin chronology
Izzy Stradlin and the Ju Ju Hounds (1992)	Izzy Stradlin and the Ju Ju Hounds Live (1993)

Izzy Stradlin and the Ju Ju Hounds is the debut solo album by American rock and roll musician Izzy Stradlin, released after his departure from Guns N' Roses. It is his only album under the Ju Ju Hounds moniker.

== Overview ==
Released in 1992, Izzy Stradlin and the Ju Ju Hounds spawned two Top 20 rock radio hits: "Shuffle It All" and "Somebody Knockin'". The album was mixed in Copenhagen.

== Critical reception ==
Professional ratings
Review scores
Source	Rating
AllMusic	4.5/5 stars
Entertainment Weekly	B
Kerrang!	4/5 stars
Orlando Sentinel	4/4 stars

Trouser Press called the debut "a surprisingly strong album that dramatically shows the rootsy sensibility [Stradlin] brought to G n’ R. It sounds like a good Keith Richards solo album (and is actually much better than the album Richards released around the same time)." The album was named 16th best album of the year by Kerrang!

== Track listing ==
1. "Somebody Knockin'" (Stradlin, Jimmy Ashhurst) - 3:27
2. "Pressure Drop" (Frederick Hibbert) - 2:42
3. "Time Gone By" (Stradlin, Rick Richards) - 3:47
4. "Shuffle It All" (Stradlin, Ashhurst) - 6:19
5. "Bucket o' Trouble" (Stradlin) - 2:10
6. "Train Tracks" (Stradlin) - 4:27
7. "How Will It Go" (Stradlin) - 3:51
8. "Cuttin' the Rug" (Stradlin) - 5:01
9. "Take a Look at the Guy" (Ron Wood) - 4:45
10. "Come on Now Inside" (Stradlin) - 6:58
11. "Morning Tea" (hidden bonus track, starts 4:26 into track 10)

Japanese track listing (MVCD-94)

1. "Somebody Knockin" (Stradlin, Jimmy Ashhurst) - 3:27
2. "Pressure Drop" (Frederick Hibbert) - 2:42
3. "Time Gone By" (Stradlin, Richards) - 3:47
4. "Shuffle It All" (Stradlin, Ashhurst) - 6:19
5. "Bucket o' Trouble" (Stradlin) - 2:10
6. "How Much" (Stradlin) - 5:04
7. "Train Tracks" (Stradlin) - 4:27
8. "How Will It Go?" (Stradlin) - 3:51
9. "Cuttin' the Rug" (Stradlin) - 5:01
10. "Take a Look at the Guy" (Ron Wood) - 4:45
11. "Come on Now Inside" (Stradlin) - 4:26
12. "Morning Tea" - 2:35 (presented as hidden bonus track on US version, but indexed as separate track on Japanese CD)

== Personnel ==
- Izzy Stradlin – rhythm guitar, lead vocals, harmonica, percussion

The Ju Ju Hounds

- Rick Richards – lead guitar, slide guitar, percussion
- Jimmy Ashhurst – bass guitar, backing vocals
- Charlie "Chalo" Quintana – drums, percussion, backing vocals

Additional personnel

- Ian McLagan – Hammond B-3 (on tracks 1, 4, 5, 7, 8, and 9), piano (on track 9)
- Craig Ross – guitar (on tracks 1, 5)
- Eddie Ashworth – mandolin (on tracks 3, 7, 10)
- Stefon Taylor – backing vocals (track 4)
- Doni Gray – drums, vocal harmony (on track 10)
- Nicky Hopkins – piano (on track 10)
- Ron Wood – guitar, vocals (on track 9)
- Marc Ford (uncredited) – guitar (on track 1)

== Charts ==
Chart performance of Izzy Stradlin and the Ju Ju Hounds
Chart (1992)	Peak position
Australian Albums (ARIA)	42
German Albums (Offizielle Top 100)	78
Swedish Albums (Sverigetopplistan)	32
UK Albums (Official Charts)	52
US Billboard 200	102
US Cash Box Top Albums	62

== Tour ==
Date	City	Country	Venue
1992 Tour
23 September 1992	Chicago	United States	Avalon
30 September 1992	Paris	France	Espace Ornano
2 October 1992	Hamburg	Germany	Grosse Freiheit 36
5 October 1992	Munich	Germany	Nachtwerk
7 October 1992	Amsterdam	Netherlands	Melkweg
9 October 1992	Harlesden	England	Mean Fiddler
13 October 1992	Melbourne	Australia	
14 October 1992	Kawasaki	Japan	Club Citta
16 October 1992	Osaka	Japan	Matsushita Hall
17 October 1992	Tokyo	Japan	Shibuya Koukaidou
21 October 1992	Newcastle	Australia	
27 October 1992	Sydney	Australia	Dee Why Hotel
30 October 1992	Melbourne	Australia	The Palace Complex
31 October 1992	Baxter	Australia	Baxter Tavern
1 November 1992	Melbourne	Australia	Sarah Sands Hotel
2 November 1992	Melbourne	Australia	Village Green Hotel
3 November 1992	Sydney	Australia	St George Budapest Soccer Club
10 November 1992	Auckland	New Zealand	Auckland Town Hall
17 November 1992	Sockholm	Sweden	Daily News
18 November 1992	Oslo	Norway	Sentrum Scene
19 November 1992	Lund	Sweden	Mejeriet
21 November 1992	Copenhagen	Denmark	Pumpehuset
22 November 1992	Bonn	Germany	Biskuithalle
23 November 1992	Frankfurt	Germany	Batschkapp
24 November 1992	Ludwigsburg	Germany	Rockfrabik
26 November 1992	Bremen	Germany	Aladin
27 November 1992	Amsterdam	Netherlands	Paradiso Grote Zaal
28 November 1992	Ghent	Belgium	Vooruit Concertzaal
30 November 1992	Milan	Italy	Rolling Stone
1 December 1992	Zurich	Switzerland	Electric Ballroom
2 December 1992	Paris	France	Elysse Montmarte
3 December 1992	Barcelona	Spain	Zeleste 2
4 December 1992	Madrid	Spain	Sala Canciller
5 December 1992	Newport	Wales	Newport Centre
7 December 1992	Manchester	England	Academy 1
9 December 1992	Nottingham	England	Rock City
10 December 1992	Leeds	England	Town And Country Club
11 December 1992	Middlesbrough	England	Middlesbrough Town Hall
12 December 1992	Glasgow	Scotland	Barrowland
14 December 1992	London	England	Town And Country Club
17 December 1992	Belfast	Ireland	Mandela Hall
18 December 1992	Dublin	Ireland	Tivoli Theatre
1993 Tour
21 January 1993	San Francisco	United States	Bill Graham Civic Auditorium
25 January 1993	Burbank	United States	Rockline Studios
6 February 1993	Tijuana	Mexico	Iguanas
7 February 1993	Tempe	United States	Club Rio
8 February 1993	Las Vegas	United States	Huntridge Theatre
9 February 1993	Phoenix	United States	
10 February 1993	Glendale	United States	Bangles Nightclub
12 February 1993	Kansas City	United States	Lone Star
13 February 1993	St Louis	United States	Mississippi Bar
14 February 1993	Omaha	United States	Ranch Bowl
16 February 1993	Columbus	United States	Newport Music Hall
18 February 1993	Toledo	United States	Roxanne's
19 February 1993	Grand Rapids	United States	The Intersection
20 February 1993	Roseville	United States	The Ritz
21 February 1993	New Orleans	United States	
22 February 1993	Fort Wayne	United States	Pierre's Entertainment Section
23 February 1993	Indianapolis	United States	The Vogue
24 February 1993	Cleveland	United States	Peabody's Downunder
26 February 1993	Chicago	United States	Metro
27 February 1993	Minneapolis	United States	First Avenue
28 February 1993	Minneapolis	United States	The Mirage
6 March 1993	Atlanta	United States	Center Stage
7 March 1993	Memphis	United States	New Daisy Theatre
8 March 1993	Panama City Beach	United States	Spinnaker Beach Club
10 March 1993	St Petersburg	United States	Jannus Landing
11 March 1993	Fort Lauderdale	United States	The Edge
12 March 1993	Fern Park	United States	The Station
14 March 1993	Charleston	United States	Myskyns
15 March 1993	Knoxville	United States	Bijou Theatre
16 March 1993	Charlotte	United States	Rockys
11 April 1993	Montreal	Canada	Auditorium De Verdun
1993 Japan Tour
14 September 1993	Osaka	Japan	Festival Hall
15 September 1993	Nagoya	Japan	Aichi-Ken Kinrou Kaikan
17 September 1993	Kawasaki	Japan	Club Citta
18 September 1993	Tokyo	Japan	Shibuya Koukaidou
19 September 1993	Tokyo	Japan	Shibuya Koukaidou
