= Mercy (Burden Brothers album) =

Studio album by Burden Brothers
- Released: October 31, 2006
- Recorded: 2006
- Genre: Hard rock
- Length: 56:23
- Label: Kirtland Records
- Producers: Joe Chiccarelli; David Castell

Burden Brothers chronology
Buried in Your Black Heart (2003)	Mercy (2006)

Professional ratings
Review scores
Source	Rating
TuneLab Music	(7/10)

Mercy is the second and final full-length album by the Burden Brothers which was released on October 31, 2006 by Kirtland Records.

The album was released 2 weeks earlier, on October 17, in digital format on iTunes and other download sites.

== Track listing ==
Track listing and times come from Allmusic

1. "It's Time" – 1:52
2. "Shine" – 3:27
3. "Still" – 4:13
4. "Everybody Is Easy (We Sink/We Swim)" – 3:58
5. "She's Not Home" – 3:43
6. "Life Between" – 3:29
7. "Trick of Logic" – 4:13
8. "Good Night from Chicago" – 3:57
9. "I Am a Cancer" – 4:57
10. "Daughter of Science" – 4:04
11. "Mercy" – 1:14
12. "In My Sky" – 3:43
13. "On Our Own" – 3:00
14. "Oh, Cecilia" – 4:26
15. "Liberated" – 6:07
16. "Suffragette City" – 3:34
  - iTunes exclusive

== Charts ==
=== Single ===
Year	Single	Chart	Position
2006	"Everybody Is Easy (We Sink/We Swim)"	Hot Mainstream Rock Tracks	No. 36

== Personnel ==
- Vaden Todd Lewis - vocals, guitar
- Taz Bentley - vocals, drums
- Casey Hess - vocals, guitar
- Corey Rozzoni - guitar
- Zack Busby - vocals, electric bass
