= Buried in Your Black Heart =

2003 studio album by Burden Brothers

Studio album by Burden Brothers
- Released: November 18, 2003
- Recorded: The Hit Shack, Austin, Texas and Stompbox, Arlington, Texas
- Genre: Hard rock
- Length: 41:17
- Label: Kirtland
- Producer: David Castell, Vaden Todd Lewis, and Taz Bentley

Burden Brothers chronology
Queen O' Spades (2003)	Buried in Your Black Heart (2003)	Mercy (2006)

Singles from Buried in Your Black Heart
- 1. "Beautiful Night" Released: 2004; 2. "Shadow" Released: 2005

Professional ratings
Review scores
Source	Rating
PopMatters	(favorable)

Buried in Your Black Heart is the first full-length album by Burden Brothers, after the release of multiple EPs. This was Burden Brothers' first recording with a solidified band lineup. The album was considered Burden Brothers' most successful album, spawning two relatively hit singles. The album was released in November 2003 on Kirtland Records. As of January 2007, the album has sold over 100,000 copies.

The album was a critical and commercial success, with "Beautiful Night" having an unofficial demo circulating throughout Texas area radio stations even before the album's recording. When the album was released, sources such as the Dallas Observer stated the album was "early Soundgarden. Think '70s arena rock." MTV said the album was a mixture of "Tough, driving metal & head-bobbing arena rock."

The lead single "Beautiful Night" was a commercial success, with it charting at #24 on the Billboard Mainstream Rock Charts, and being used for a variety of commercial purposes (the NHL team Dallas Stars used the song in their opening sequence because of the song's chorus and the line "It's a beautiful night/To watch the stars." The follow-up single "Shadow" charted, but not nearly as high as "Beautiful Night".

Due to the relative success of the album, the band began touring as opening acts for Velvet Revolver, Papa Roach, and Finger Eleven. This touring eventually led to the recording of a live DVD entitled RYFOLAMF. During this time, the band also recruited Casey Hess for remaining tour dates and future recordings. This album is one of Kirtland Records highest-selling albums to date.

== Track listing ==
All songs by Taz Bentley and Vaden Todd Lewis unless otherwise noted.

1. "Buried in Your Black Heart" – 2:14
2. "Shadow" (Lewis) – 3:38
3. "Beautiful Night" – 4:16
4. "Come on Down" – 2:45
5. "You're So God Damn Beautiful" – 4:40
6. "If You're Going to Heaven" (Lewis) – 3:41
7. "Do for Me" – 3:12
8. "Walk Away" (Bentley) – 3:04
9. "Your Fault" – 3:58
10. "Conditional" (Lewis) – 4:57
11. "Let It Go" – 4:52

== Personnel ==
- Vaden Todd Lewis - vocals and guitar
- Corey Rozzoni - backing vocals and guitar
- Casey Orr - backing vocals and bass guitar
- Taz Bentley - backing vocals, drums, percussion, and guitar
- The Charismatics - gang vocal assistance (on "Do For Me")
- Beth Lewis - choir (on "Let it Go")
- Darla Oates - choir (on "Let it Go")
- Kelly Brown - choir (on "Let it Go")
- Suzette Carter Albrecht - keys (on "Your Fault" and "Let it Go")
- David Castell - producer
- Derek Taylor - mixing (except "Beautiful Night")
- David J. Holman - mixing ("Beautiful Night")
- John Kirtland - executive producer
- Robert Vosgien - mastering
- Angela Bures - album coordinator
- Razdezignz - album artwork
- Matt Cooper - band photos

== Chart positions ==
=== Single ===
Year	Single	Chart	Position
2004	"Beautiful Night"	Mainstream Rock Tracks	24
