= Burden Brothers =

American hard rock band

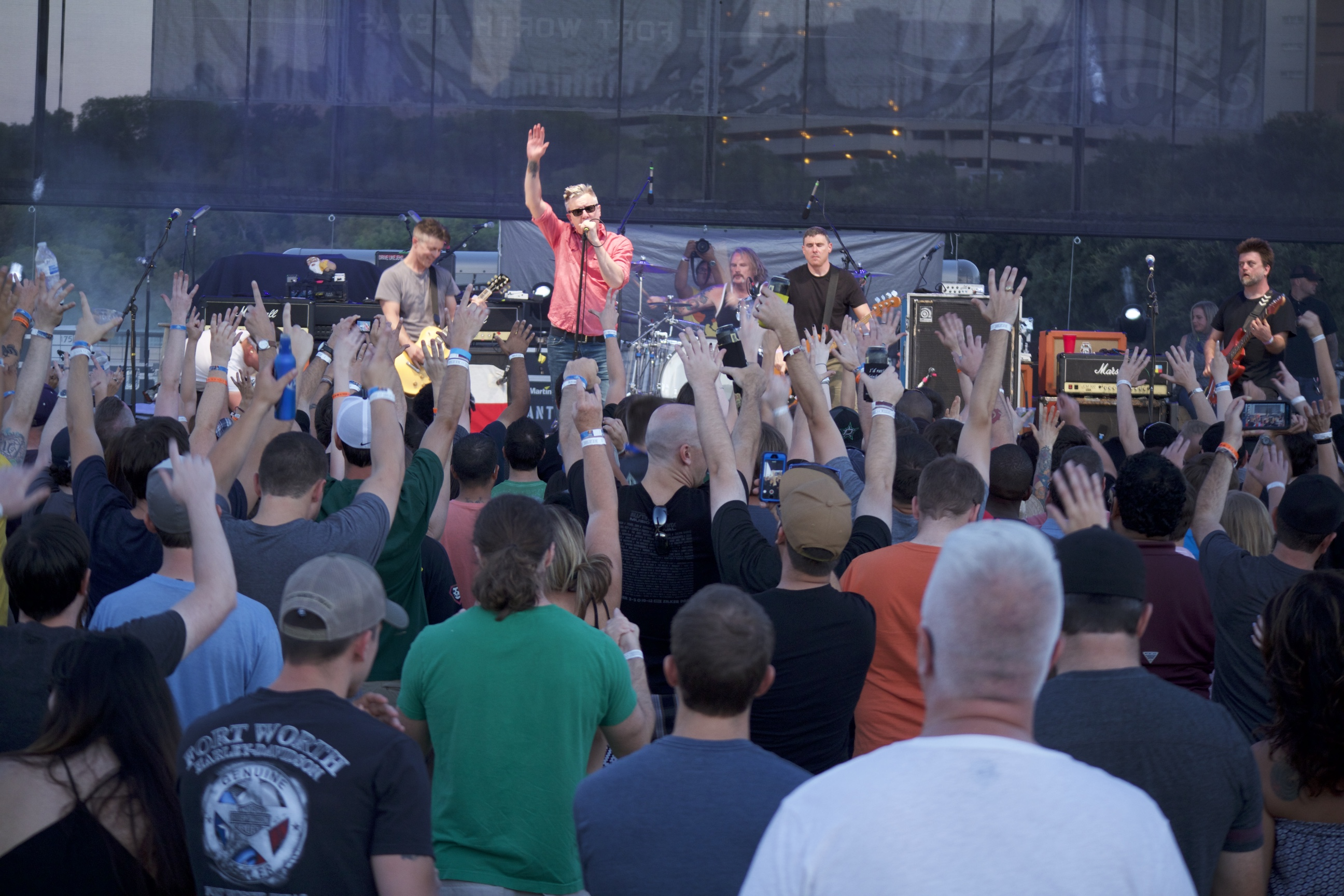
- Burden Brothers performing at Dia De Los Toadies in September 2015.

Background information
- Origin: Dallas, Texas
- Genres: Hard rock, grunge, arena rock
- Years active: 2002–2007, 2015-present
- Labels: Kirtland, Last Beat
- Spinoff of: Toadies
- Members: Vaden Todd Lewis; Patrick "Taz" Bentley; Casey Hess
- Past members: Corey Rozzoni; Zack Busby; Casey Orr; Zach Blair

Burden Brothers are a hard rock band formed in Dallas, Texas in 2002, by lead singer/songwriter/guitarist Vaden Todd Lewis and drummer Taz Bentley, initially as a side project from their other musical endeavors. The band currently consists of Lewis (Vocals/Guitar), Bentley (Drums/Vocals), and Casey Hess (Guitar/Vocals). The band went on indefinite hiatus in 2007, due to the Toadies reunion and other interests, but reunited to perform at the Dia De Los Toadies music festival in September 2015.

== History ==
=== Early years ===
Lead singer/songwriter for the band, Vaden Todd Lewis was recently coming off of a short-lived reunion of his platinum-selling band Toadies, and after an unsuccessful album release and tour, the band once again broke up. Meanwhile, drummer Taz Bentley was known for working with the Reverend Horton Heat and Izzy Stradlin. Lewis and Betley were both residents of Dallas, and had been friendly for years due to their respective bands appearing at the same tours and festivals. The two began jamming together, and eventually decided to start a band in 2002. They took their name from a sign on the side of a building in Dallas, with Lewis explaining "I Just like the connection of family and guilt associated together. It also kind of makes me think of brothers - like me and Taz doing it as a team". After bad experiences with record labels, Lewis and Bentley decided to keep the band low-key, making tracks available via the internet, but soon received interest from local record labels.

The band released three EPs which were recorded by Lewis and Bentley who were supported by a rotating roster of other musicians. The EPs, titled 8 Ball, Queen O' Spades, and "Beautiful Night", were released on Last Beat Records. After warm reception to these EPs, and radio play of their promotional single "Beautiful Night" in Tulsa, Dallas, and Houston areas in heavy rotation, the band decided to release a full-length album. Thus, the band ended up keeping Corey Rozzoni who worked with Clumsy, and Casey Orr who was famous for his work with Gwar.

After winning on-air "smash or trash" radio competitions in Austin, Texas for several weeks with a demo of "Beautiful Night", the single became added into heavy rotation in the area. The single spread fast into Dallas, Houston, and Tulsa radio markets, before the band signed with Kirtland Records, an independent label run by studio engineer John Kirtland who had also played drums with Deep Blue Something. "Beautiful Night" won 'Best Singles' at the 2004 Dallas Observer Music Awards. Their new album was to be produced by David Castell (Space Cadet, The Buck Pets), and was said to be a throwback to classic arena rock mixed with grunge, and a bit of modern rock. Lewis described the band's approach in 2002: "We pretty much decided that when we go into a club, it doesn't matter how many people are there, we're gonna make it 1977 arena-style. Not with the hair, hopefully, but we'll make it when rock was fun and big and cool."

The band released the full-length album Buried in Your Black Heart in 2003, a hard rock throwback that many critics stated as "fresh, driving, and fun". The Dallas Observer noticed the album was "early Soundgarden. Think 70's arena rock". MTV said the album was "Tough, driving metal & head-bobbing arena rock". The album received fairly positive reviews, as they sighted it was fairly fresh, catchy, and fun, with a mix of sounds from "garage rock" to "murky grunge...that has a lot in common with Soundgarden or early Pearl Jam." Lewis described the album as "good old fashioned rock n' roll", and later stated that they "didn't take much risks recording the album". Led by lead single "Beautiful Night" (which charted at #24 on Billboard Mainstream Rock Charts) and follow-up single "Shadow", the band received national recognition, touring with bands like Velvet Revolver, Papa Roach and Finger Eleven.

After the successful release of their debut album, the band recruited yet another guitarist in Casey Hess for their remaining tour dates and later, for the recording and tour for their second album, Mercy. During their extensive touring, the band recorded a live DVD, entitled RYFOLAMF. Their debut Buried in Your Black Heart went on to sell over 100,000 records in the United States, and have become one of Kirtland Records highest selling artists. The single "Beautiful Night" is used during games for the ice hockey team Dallas Stars, due to the line "It's a beautiful night/to watch the Stars." The band won eight awards in the 2005 Dallas Observer Music Awards.

=== Mercy Years ===
In 2005, the band went back to the drawing board for their next release. They wanted to keep that fairly catchy, edgy sound, but this time, they wanted to take risks by experimenting more with their music. The recording sessions finished in early 2006, and in 2006, they released their second album Mercy. The album was produced by Grammy award winning producer Joe Chiccarelli (The Shins, Beck, Hole, U2) and David Castell. Vaden Todd described the album as "moody". The album's lyrics approached the downfall of society and finding out "who you are at the core." The album includes unorthodox instruments for a rock group, such as strings, bells, etc. Mercy once again had a relatively positive critical and fan reception, which track "Everybody is Easy (We Sink/We Swim)" receiving moderate airplay across the country. "Shine" was also released as a single, but did not chart as well as "Everybody is Easy". The album "rocks your backside about 75 percent of the time" according to the Fort Worth Weekly.

However, the album did not sell as well as Buried in Your Black Heart and did not receive near as much promotion by their record label as their debut. The band did not have much of a successful tour for the album as well, and the commercial failure of the album was one of the many reasons for the departure of much of the band. The album has gone on to sell around 50,000-70,000 records in the United States, well below Buried in Your Black Heart's total.

=== Hiatus and Reunion ===
The band went on hiatus in 2006, with Lewis rejoining the Toadies and other band members moving on to other projects. The band remained on indefinite hiatus until April 2015, when it was announced that the Burden Brothers would be playing at the annual Dia De Los Toadies music festival to be held September 11–12, 2015 at Panther Island Pavilion in Fort Worth. The band performed at Panther Island Pavilion on September 12, 2015, in their first live performance since 2006.

== Band members ==
=== Current members ===
- Vaden Todd Lewis – vocals, guitar (2002–present)
- Taz Bentley – drums (2002–present)
- Casey Hess (formerly of Doosu and Jump Rope Girls) – guitar (2003–present)

=== Former members ===
- Corey Rozzoni (formerly of Clumsy) – guitar (2003–2007)
- Zack Busby (formerly of Slow Roosevelt, Halls of the Machine and Only Crime) – bass (2006–2007, 2015)
- Casey Orr (Currently with Gwar, formerly of Ministry, Rigor Mortis, Speedealer, Blohole, The Hellions, and X–Cops) – bass (2003–2005)
- Mark Hughes (Baboon) – bass (2002-2003)
- Mike Rudnicki (Baboon) – guitar (2002-2003, 2015)
- Zach Blair (Rise Against, Gwar, Hagfish) – guitar (2002)
- Josh Daugherty (Dovehunter, Pinkston, Earl) – guitar (2002-2003)

== Discography ==
=== Albums ===
- Buried in Your Black Heart (2003)
- Mercy (2006)

=== EPs ===
- Burden Brothers (2002)
- 8 Ball (2002)
- "Queen O' Spades" (2002)
- "Walk Away" / "Jailbreak" Split 7" with Supersuckers (2005)

=== Singles ===
Year	Song	US Main	Album
2004	"Beautiful Night"	24	Buried in Your Black Heart
2005	"Shadow"	-	Buried in Your Black Heart
2006	"Everybody is Easy (We Sink/We Swim)"	36	Mercy
2007	"Shine"	-	Mercy

=== Live DVDs ===
- RYFOLAMF (Rock Your Face Off Like A Mother Fucker) (2005)
