= Burden Brothers (EP) =

Beautiful Night

EP by Burden Brothers
- Released: 2002
- Recorded: 2002
- Genre: Rock and roll
- Length: 24:22
- Label: Last Beat Records

Burden Brothers chronology
Beautiful Night (2002)	8 Ball (2003)

Burden Brothers (sometimes referred to as the "Beautiful Night" or Evel EP) is the first release by the Burden Brothers. It was released in 2002 on Last Beat Records. Musicians featured on this EP include Mike Rudnicki and Mark Hughes of Baboon, Josh Daugherty of Pinkston and Ben Burt of Brutal Juice.

== Track listing ==
1. "Beautiful Night" (Bentley, Lewis) – 4:19
2. "Buried in Your Black Heart" (Bentley, Lewis) – 2:17
3. "Hang Your Head" (Bentley, Lewis) – 4:52
4. "Your Fault" (Bentley, Lewis) – 3:59

== Personnel ==
- Vaden Todd Lewis - vocals, guitar; bass (track 3)
- Taz Bentley - drums
- Josh Daugherty - guitar (tracks 1, 2 and 4)
- Mark Hughes - bass (tracks 1, 2 and 4)
- Mike Rudnicki - guitar
- Ben Burt - percussion (track 3)
- Ean Parsons - guitar (track 4)
