= Taz Bentley =

American drummer

Patrick "Taz" Bentley
- Also known as: Taz, The Taz
- Origin: Dallas, Texas, U.S.
- Genres: Rock and roll
- Occupation: Musician
- Instrument: Drums
- Years active: 1990s–present
- Labels: Kirtland Records
- Website: theburdenbrothers.com

Patrick Bentley, better known as Taz or The Taz, is an American rock and roll drummer. He got his start as a founding member of the local Dallas punk band, The Assassins, and is probably best known for his work with The Reverend Horton Heat, Burden Brothers and session work with Izzy Stradlin and Duff McKagan of Guns N' Roses.

Taz has most recently performed with Burden Brothers, Dwarves, Hell Texas, and 76, which includes Terry Glaze (Pantera, Lord Tracy), Kinley Wolfe (The Cult, American Fuse, Lord Tracy) and Brian Harris (Queen for a Day, Lord Tracy).

== Discography ==
=== With American Fuse ===
- One Fell Swoop (2002)

=== With Burden Brothers ===
- 8 Ball (2002 EP)
- Queen O' Spades (2002 EP)
- Beautiful Night (2003 EP)
- Buried in Your Black Heart (2003)
- "Shadow" (2004 single)
- "Walk Away" / "Jailbreak" (2005 single)
- RYFOLAMF (Rock Your Face Off Like A Mother Fucker) (2005 live DVD)
- Mercy (2006)

=== With Matt Cameron ===
- "Theme From Wrong Holy-O" from Flyin' Traps (1997)

=== With El Diablo ===
- $6.99 EP (1999)

=== With Hillbilly Hellcats ===
- Our Brand (1998)
- "The Darkside" on Big Monster Bash, Vol. 1 (1998)
- Rev it Up with the Taz (1995)

=== With Loaded ===
- Episode 1999: Live (1999)

=== With P. W. Long ===
- Remembered (2003)

=== With Duff McKagan ===
- Beautiful Disease (1999)

=== With Pinkston ===
- All That Causes Bruises (2002)

=== With The Reverend Horton Heat ===
- Psychobilly Freakout (1990 single)
- Smoke 'em if You Got 'em (1990)
- The Full Custom Gospel Sounds (1993)
- "400 Bucks / Caliénte" (1994 single)
- Liquor in the Front (1994)
- "One Time for Me" (1994 single)
- Holy Roller (1999)
- 20th Century Masters – The Millennium Collection: The Best of The Reverend Horton Heat (2006)

=== With Sawyer Brown ===
- Drive Me Wild (1999)

=== With Izzy Stradlin ===
- 117° (1998)
- Ride On (1999)
- River (2001)
- On Down the Road (2002)
- Like a Dog (2005)
- Miami (2007)
- Fire, the acoustic album (2007)
- Concrete (2008)
- Smoke (2009)
- Wave of Heat (2010)

=== With Tenderloin ===
- Bullseye (1995)
- "Shotgun Willie" on Twisted Willie (1995)

=== With Bryan White ===
- "You Are My Sunshine" on For Our Children Too (1996)
- "Listen Now! Will the Circle Be Unbroken/I'll Fly Away/Jesus Loves Me" on Amazing Grace, Vol. 2: A Country Salute to Gospel (1997)
- How Lucky I Am (1999)
