= 117° =

Studio album by Izzy Stradlin
- Released: March 9, 1998
- Studios: Rumbo Recorders, Matrix, and The Complex Caribbeans Sound
- Genre: Roots rock
- Length: 44:46
- Label: Geffen
- Producers: Izzy Stradlin, Eddie Ashworth

Izzy Stradlin chronology
Izzy Stradlin and the Ju Ju Hounds Live (1993)	117° (1998)	Ride On (1999)

117° is the second studio album by American rock musician Izzy Stradlin, and his first not released under a band name, following the breakup of his post-Guns N' Roses group the Ju Ju Hounds. The album contains a cover of "Memphis" by Chuck Berry.

The album features appearances from Stradlin's former Guns N' Roses bandmate Duff McKagan and former Ju Ju Hounds' bandmate Rick Richards. The tracks "Memphis" and "Good Enough" feature the Ju Ju Hounds lineup, as the songs were recorded by the band before breaking up.

== Critical reception ==
Professional ratings
Review scores
Source	Rating
AllMusic	3/5 stars
MusicHound Rock: The Essential Album Guide	3.5/5 stars
Sputnikmusic	4.5/5

AllMusic wrote that the album "rocks harder than most roots-rock albums of the late '90s." The Deseret News wrote that "lots of slide guitars, rip-roaring arrangements and drawling, wit-driven vocals give the 14 songs their charm." The Washington City Paper wrote that "there’s nothing groundbreaking on 117°, and Stradlin’s guitar work certainly falls short of being virtuosic, but there are worse things to listen to when you’re killing brain cells from dusk ’til dawn."

== Track listing ==
All lyrics and music by Izzy Stradlin, except where noted.

1. "Ain't It a Bitch" - 3:49
2. "Gotta Say" - 3:17
3. "Memphis" (Chuck Berry) - 2:58
4. "Old Hat" - 3:16
5. "Bleedin" - 3:15
6. "Parasite" - 1:39
7. "Good Enough" - 2:49
8. "117°" - 3:12
9. "Here Before You" - 3:47
10. "Up Jumped the Devil" (Barney Koumis/Ronnie Dawson) - 2:55
11. "Grunt" - 4:29
12. "Freight Train" - 3:25
13. "Methanol" (Stradlin/Rick Richards) - 3:29
14. "Surf Roach" (Stradlin/Joe Isbell) - 2:26

Japanese bonus tracks

1. Crackin' Up (Live)
2. Pressure Drop (Live)

== Personnel ==
- Izzy Stradlin – lead vocals, rhythm guitar, acoustic guitar, bass on "117°" and "Grunt"
- Rick Richards – lead guitar, slide guitar, keyboards on "Good Enough", backing vocals (all except 6), lead vocals on the intro of "Here Before You"
- Duff McKagan – bass (except 3, 7, 8 and 11)
- Taz Bentley – drums (except 3 and 7), percussion on "Bleedin'", backing vocals on "117°"

Additional personnel

- Eddie Ashworth – mandolin on "Gotta Say" and "Bleedin'"
- Jimmy Ashhurst – bass, backing vocals (tracks 3 and 7)
- Charlie "Chalo" Quintana – drums (tracks 3 and 7)
- Steve Winstead – backing vocals on "Here Before You"
