= Tenderness (Duff McKagan album) =

Studio album by Duff McKagan
- Released: May 31, 2019
- Studios: Stationhouse Studio, New Brighton, Merseyside, UK
- Genres: Rock; country
- Length: 47:55
- Label: Universal Music Enterprises
- Producer: Shooter Jennings

Duff McKagan chronology
Believe in Me (1993)	Tenderness (2019)	Lighthouse (2023)

Singles from Tenderness
- 1. "Tenderness" Released: February 22, 2019

Professional ratings
Review scores
Source	Rating
AllMusic	4/5 stars

Tenderness is the second solo album by American rock and roll musician Duff McKagan, released on May 31, 2019. Loudwire named it one of the 50 best rock albums of 2019.

Though Tenderness is McKagan's second album to be released, it is actually his third one to be produced following the unreleased Beautiful Disease.

== Background and recording ==
The album was inspired by McKagan's global travels with Guns N' Roses during the Not in This Lifetime... Tour and is considered a musical follow up to his 2015 How to be a Man book. The recording of the album began during breaks in McKagan's tour with Guns N' Roses, and featured collaborations with Shooter Jennings, The Waters and The Suicide Horn Section, amongst others.

The song "Last September" was written as a warning in support of Me Too movement with its lyrics detailing an unwanted sexual encounter.

The song "Wasted Heart" is a re-recording of the song from the 2009 Duff McKagan's Loaded album Sick.

In a 2022 interview with The Wall Street Journal, Bob Dylan singled out the track "Chip Away" from Tenderness, saying that it had "profound meaning" for him and comparing its "chip away" refrain to Michelangelo's sculpture of David and to his own practice of overwriting songs and then cutting them back in revision.

== Promotion ==
Duff McKagan made a video announcement of two solo live shows featuring Shooter Jennings to occur in May previewing a new song during the video on February 19, 2019. The song was later revealed as the first single, "Tenderness", released on 22 February 2019, accompanied by the lyric video. The second song released from the album along with the announcement of the album details was "Chip Away". On April 19 McKagan premiered the third new song "Don't Look Behind You" and on May 17 another new song titled "Last September".

A tour in support of the album featuring Shooter Jennings is set to start on May 30, 2019.

== Release ==
The album was released in several versions, including on CD, LP and deluxe yellow and red starburst coloured LP editions. The LP edition of the album omits the track "Cold Outside" and switches the order of "Feel" and "Breaking Rocks".

== Track listing ==
All songs written by Duff McKagan except unless noted.

No.	Title	Writer(s)	Length
1.	"Tenderness"		4:03
2.	"It's Not Too Late"		4:09
3.	"Wasted Heart"	McKagan, Trey Bruce, Michael Squires	4:41
4.	"Falling Down"		3:10
5.	"Last September"		6:21
6.	"Chip Away"		3:21
7.	"Cold Outside" (CD and digital edition only)		4:42
8.	"Feel"		4:38
9.	"Breaking Rocks"		3:02
10.	"Parkland"		3:34
11.	"Don't Look Behind You"		6:14
Total length:			47:55

== Personnel ==
- Duff McKagan – vocals, bass guitar, acoustic guitar
- John Schreffler – guitar (tracks 1, 4, 6–7), backing vocals (tracks 1, 2, 5, 8), pedal steel guitar (tracks 2, 3, 5, 7); 12-string acoustic guitar (track 9)
- Jonathan Wilson – lead guitar, synth (tracks 1, 4, 8)
- Jon Graboff – pedal steel guitar (track 1, 7)
- Jamie Douglass – drums, percussion (all tracks except 1), backing vocals (track 5)
- Aubrey Richmond – fiddle (track 1–3, 5–7), backing vocals (tracks 1–2, 5, 8)
- Mike Squires – backing vocals (track 2)
- Shooter Jennings – keyboards (all tracks except 1), guitar (track 2), backing vocals (track 2), vocals (track 7), producing, mixing
- Steve Elliot – guitar (tracks 3, 10)
- James King – saxophone (track 3)
- The Waters – backing vocals (tracks 4, 8, 10)
- Jesse Dayton – lead guitar (track 7)
- Brian Scanlon – saxophone (track 10)
- Matt McKagan – trombone (track 10)
- Chuck Findley – trumpet (track 10)

=== Additional personnel ===
- Pete Lyman – mastering at Infrasonic Sound, Los Angeles, CA, United States
- Mark Rains – engineer
- Mike "McBob" Mayhue – technician
- Jason Feinberg, Alex Sale – product manager
- Brian Klein – management
- Beth Sabbagh, DWA – business management
- Donny Phillips, KIHL Studio – art direction, design
- Scott Dudelson, Jesse DeFlorio – photography
- Andrew Daw, Jeff Fura – A&R
- Doug Mark – legal
- Duff Battye, Michael Moses, Sujata Murthy – public relations

== Charts ==
Chart (2019)	Peak position
Scottish Albums (Official Charts)	42
Swiss Albums (Schweizer Hitparade)	42
