= Casey Hess =

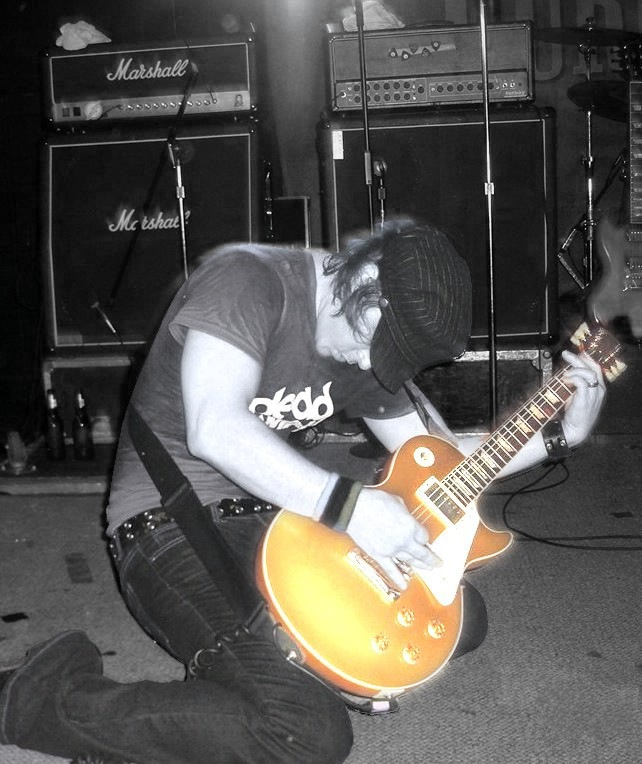

Background information
- Born: Ohio, United States
- Origin: Germaian, Cherokee
- Genres: Rock
- Occupation: Musician
- Instrument(s): Guitar, vocals
- Website: myspace.com/vermillion5

Casey Hess (formerly of Doosu and Jump Rope Girls) is currently one of the guitarists for the American rock band Burden Brothers based out of Dallas, Texas.
