= Fire, the Acoustic Album =

Fire, the acoustic album

Studio album by Izzy Stradlin
- Released: November 19, 2007
- Recorded: California; Summer 2007
- Genre: Folk rock, acoustic rock
- Length: 35:18

Izzy Stradlin chronology
Miami (2007)	Fire, the acoustic album (2007)	Concrete (2008)

Fire, the acoustic album is the eighth studio album by former Guns N' Roses guitarist Izzy Stradlin, originally released only on iTunes in 2007. The album is mainly acoustic-driven, with country, folk and blues roots.

== Background ==
The album was recorded in California during the summer of 2007, with very basic production. The album was mixed in Dallas at Nomad Studios, and mastered by Gary Long. Izzy Stradlin co-wrote two songs ("Box and "Seems to Me") with UK-based musician Timo Kaltio. Izzy first informed Will Vilers (his website administrator) about the album on November 5, 2007, with an e-mail simply titled "Fire, the Acoustic Album." The album's full track listing was later revealed on Izzy's website, directly in conjunction with the album's release on iTunes.

== Track listing ==
All lyrics and music by Izzy Stradlin, except where noted.

1. "I Don't Mind" - 3:39
2. "Infrastruk" - 3:24
3. "Listen" - 3:17
4. "Airbus" - 3:29
5. "Fire" - 3:47
6. "Seems to Me" (Stradlin, Timo Kaltio) - 3:30
7. "Long Night" - 3:15
8. "Box" (Stradlin, Kaltio) - 4:20
9. "Milo" - 3:30
10. "Harp Song" - 3:03

== Personnel ==
- Izzy Stradlin - vocals, rhythm guitar
- Rick Richards - lead guitar
- JT Longoria - bass guitar
- Taz Bentley - drums
