= Eddie Ashworth =

American record producer

Eddie Ashworth (born in Inglewood, California) is a record producer, engineer, mixer, musician, university professor, and writer, best known for his work in the alternative rock and indie rock genres. His primary instrument is mandolin; he also plays guitar and assorted keyboards.

== Early life ==
As a child Ashworth became interested in music technology and would play with the analog consumer recording gear his father had around the house. Due to his early interest in music his parents bought him a Sears Silvertone guitar, and he leaned to play piano and mandolin. Later Ashworth studied English at UCLA and graduated with a BA in English literature.

== Career ==
Ashworth's first gold record was Once Bitten... for Great White although many years earlier he helped engineer chart-toppers City Nights by Nick Gilder and Bombs Away Dream Babies by John Stewart, formerly of The Kingston Trio. During the mid 1990s his work reached a wide audience due to the multi-platinum success of Sublime's self-titled album, as well as records with Pennywise, Izzy Stradlin, Unwritten Law, Dada, Frenzal Rhomb, Eastern Youth, Pink Noise Test, and many others. He currently is the owner of The Oxide Shed recording studio in Athens, Ohio.

Since 2003 Ashworth has been an associate professor at Ohio University. He teaches courses in record production and the music industry. He has recently taken a public stance against the RIAA's legal practices.
