= Cheer Up (Plexi album) =

Studio album by Plexi
- Released: October 8, 1996
- Recorded: January–February 1996
- Studios: Ardent (Memphis); Fox Force Five (Los Angeles); Ocean Way (Los Angeles)
- Genres: Gothic rock; hard rock; art pop; post-punk
- Length: 40:45
- Labels: Sub Pop; Lava; Atlantic
- Producers: Jimmy Boyle; Jeff Powell; Plexi

Plexi chronology
I.F.A. (1995)	Cheer Up (1996)

Singles from Cheer Up
- 1. "Roller Rock Cam" Released: February 7, 1997; 2. "Forest Ranger" Released: July 11, 1997

Cheer Up is the only studio album by the American rock band Plexi, released on October 8, 1996, through Sub Pop. The band recorded the album with producers Jimmy Boyle and Jeff Powell at Ardent Studios, Fox Force Five and Ocean Way Recording between January and February 1996. Cheer Up is a gothic rock, hard rock, art pop and post-punk album that combines elements from a variety of genres, melodic textures, psychedelic guitars, and dark, angst-ridden lyrics.

Music critics praised Cheer Up's songwriting and stylistic diversity. The album received little attention upon its initial release, which coincided with a management shakeup at Sub Pop. In July 1997, it was reissued through the major labels Lava and Atlantic Records, after which Plexi toured the United States with Sugar Ray and Smash Mouth in August. "Roller Rock Cam" and "Forest Ranger" were released as radio singles, with a music video being filmed for the latter.

== Background and recording ==
Plexi were formed in Los Angeles in 1993 by bassist and vocalist Michael Angelos, guitarist Micheal Barragan and drummer Norm Block. After releasing a self-titled extended play on Boy's Life Records and another EP for I.F.A. Records in 1995, the band attracted the attention of several independent labels. The band decided to sign with Sub Pop as they were friends with some of its personnel. In January and February 1996, Plexi recorded Cheer Up at Ardent Studios in Memphis, and Fox Force Five and Ocean Way Recording in Los Angeles. The album was produced by the band, Jimmy Boyle and Jeff Powell; "Bunny" and "Star, Star" were produced by Powell and Plexi only. The album was mixed at Sony Music Studios in New York City and Ameraycan Studios in North Hollywood in April and May 1996. Tom Lord-Alge remixed "Forest Ranger" for its 1997 reissue.

== Composition ==
Cheer Up has been described as gothic rock, hard rock, art pop, and post-punk. Brad Tyer of Westword and Katherine Monk of the Vancouver Sun simply described the album as having an "alternative" sound. It has also been described as drawing and combining elements from arena rock, Britpop, heavy metal, power pop, noise rock and shoegaze. Plexi's Sub Pop press bio described the band as blending "glam, goth, punk, metal and psychedelic influences". In a 1997 interview with Scene Entertainment Weekly, Angelos cited David Bowie, Iggy Pop, and Bauhaus as influences and highlighted their "theatrics"; he also considered Plexi's Hollywood background to be an influence, stating in an interview with The Boston Phoenix that it gave them "less of an attachment to any one specific genre [and] more of an appreciation for all these various aesthetics."

Cheer Up's songs feature melodic textures juxtaposed against rough arrangements, "laconic" vocals, pop hooks, punk-influenced bass and drums, and distorted, psychedelic guitarwork. The album's instrumentation is expanded by cellos, keyboards, and other synthetic effects. Calling Plexi specialists in "tormented pop music", Malcolm Mayhew of the Fort Worth Star-Telegram described the album's lyrics as "grim" and viewed its songs as centered on "torn hope and shattered relationships". Evan Cater of AllMusic and Dusty Henry of KEXP-FM described the songs as angst-ridden, with the former calling their lyrics "caustic" and stating they bore irony and wit. Troy Ferguson of Rip It Up said that although Plexi's material was often dark, it lacked sentimentality. Angelos cited Kurt Cobain of Nirvana and Mark Lanegan of Screaming Trees as influences for their lyrical "introspection and depth".

Cheer Up's opening track "Forest Ranger" sees Angelos identify with the song's title—the meaning of which is not explained—and compare himself to Salman Rushdie, Che Gueverra, Huey Newton, and Phyllis Diller over stuttered power chords, feedback and "fancy" drums. Craig Thorn of The Boston Phoenix compared the song to Swervedriver. "Dimension" features fast-paced guitars and speed metal riffs, whilst "Roller Rock Cam" switches between psychedelic and atmospheric verses and choruses with heavy compressed glam rock guitars and hand-claps. According to Ferguson, "Peel" and "Dayglo" both showcase Plexi's "full range of down beat mood swings". The former begins with Barragan creating guitar sounds that Thorn likened to those of whales before switching to more aggressive playing above Angelos' "furious" bass; John Kappes of The Plain Dealer highlighted the latter for its "glam-new-wave heroics". "Ordinary Things" features cello, "shimmering" guitars and "hypnotic" bass, and lullaby-esque singing. Carly Carioli, also of The Boston Phoenix, viewed its lyrics as poking fun at "goth's melodramatic melancholy". The gothic rock song "Change" is followed by "Fourget", which Matt Ashare of CMJ New Music Monthly described as recalling the early, anthemic works of The Cult. Angelos described "Mountains" as a "love song"; Ashare called it a "New Order-style" minor key pop song. Following the "thrashing metal" song "56", Cheer Up ends with the cello-driven power ballad "Star, Star", which Ferguson called "sickly sweet".

== Release and promotion ==
Cheer Up was originally released through Sub Pop on October 8, 1996. Plexi celebrated the album's release with a free concert at Club Lingere in Los Angeles on October 9, 1996, and embarked on a regional tour in support of it towards the end of the year. The album received little attention upon its initial release, which coincided with a management shakeup at Sub Pop that "made [it] sorta vulnerable", according to Angelos. By January 1997, Cheer Up was scheduled to be reissued through Elektra Records; the album's lead single, "Roller Rock Cam", was serviced to radio stations on February 7. Between April and June 1997, Plexi toured the United States with Agnes Gooch supporting on most dates; they also played shows with L7, Jack Off Jill, Buzzoven and Billionaire.

Reportedly due to tensions between Sub Pop and Elektra, Warner Music Group (WMG) altered their distribution agreement with Sub Pop in June 1997 to allow the label's releases to be reissued through any WMG label; Plexi were subsequently signed to Atlantic Records. "Forest Ranger" was serviced to radio stations as Cheer Up's second single on July 11, 1997, and the album was reissued through Sub Pop, Lava and Atlantic on July 29. In August 1997, Plexi toured the United States with Sugar Ray and Smash Mouth. Carioli referred to Plexi as the tour's "black sheep"; a concert review of the band's performance in Cleveland by Scene Entertainment Weekly's Kelly Hiscott said they "put on a great show, just for the wrong crowd", whom she said were intrigued but not moved. Towards the end of the month, a music video for "Forest Ranger" entered rotation on MTV2. In September 1997, the video was aired on The Box and MTV's 120 Minutes. It was later nominated for the "Best New Artist Clip" award in the Hard Rock category of the 1997 Billboard Music Video Awards.

== Critical reception ==
Professional ratings
Review scores
Source	Rating
AllMusic	4.5/5 stars
The Boston Phoenix	2.5/4 stars
Fort Worth Star-Telegram	3.5/5 stars
Kerrang!	4/5 stars
Metal Hammer	4/5 stars
Pitchfork	3.6/10
The Plain Dealer	A
Vancouver Sun	4/5 stars

Paul Brannigan of Kerrang! highlighted and praised Cheer Up's range of styles, Barragan's guitarwork and Angelos' vocals. AllMusic's Cater praised its hooks and instrumental diveristy and highlighted the tension between its pop and noise elements. Monk of the Vancouver Sun wrote that Plexi "Go-go [danced] their way through the current morass of music with stylish elan" and "have a gift for sounding serious without losing their sense of fun." Dan Johnson of The Rocket said that Plexi drew from various influences and genres "without being overly derirative", whilst The Plain Dealer's Kappes felt the band had "achieved the near-impossible" in combining "art-goth chilliness, Bowie-Roxy Music glitter and punk sonics." Ferguson of Rip It Up described the album as a "carefully executed, shimmering psychedelic monster" and an "impressive debut" overall.

Comparing it to Adorable's debut album Against Perfection (1993), Mayhew of the Fort Worth Star-Telegram called Cheer Up an "inconsistent and unpredictable" but nevertheless "good" album. Thorn of The Boston Phoenix felt the album's mix of styles was "jarring" and that Plexi were at their best when they combined their gothic rock and metal tendencies, such as on "Mountains". Steven Parrish of The Morning Call called it "amiable but forgettable"; he criticized its "distortion and feedback" guitar sound as both dated and repetitive and compared it unfavorably to that of The Jesus and Mary Chain. Pitchfork's Ryan Schreiber found that the album lost both feeling and staying power after "Forest Ranger"; Tyer of Westword felt that, save for a few moments, it was void of substance.

Mayhew included Cheer Up in his list of the 10 best albums of 1996. Ashare of CMJ New Music Monthly called it one of the "best rock albums of 1996 that most people never heard", whilst LA Weekly's Marsha Schwartz said it was "underappreciated". Producer Jack Endino praised the album in 1997; Aimee Echo of theSTART cited it as an influence in 2003. Reviewing the album as part of a Sub Pop retrospective for KEXP-FM in 2018, Henry said that Cheer Up "fully realized" the "goth and shoegaze influences" of Plexi's early works and praised its "complex and exciting arrangements".

== Track listing ==
All tracks are written by Plexi; all lyrics are written by Michael Angelos, except "56", by Michael Barragan.

No.	Title	Length
1.	"Forest Ranger"	4:01
2.	"Dimension"	2:25
3.	"Roller Rock Cam"	3:08
4.	"Peel"	5:02
5.	"Dayglo"	3:09
6.	"Ordinary Things"	4:01
7.	"Bunny"	2:08
8.	"Change"	2:58
9.	"Fourget"	2:20
10.	"Mountains"	3:01
11.	"Magnet"	2:30
12.	"56"	2:04
13.	"Star, Star"	3:58
Total length:		40:45

== Personnel ==
Adapted from liner notes.

Plexi
- Michael Angelos – vocals, bass
- Michael Barragan – guitar, noises, Minimoog, Rhodes 88, vocals (12)
- Norm Block – drums, percussion

Additional personnel

- Melora Creager – cello (6, 13)
- Paul Roessler – keyboards (5), various other sounds

Artwork

- Jeff Kleinsmith – art direction, design
- Robert Sebree – photography
- Derrick Ion – photography
Production
- Plexi – production (all tracks)
- Jimmy Boyle – production, mixing (1–6, 8–12)
- Jeff Powell – production (all tracks), mixing (7, 13)
- Dave Schiffmann – mixing engineer (1, 6, 10, 12), additional mix engineering (2, 8, 9)
- Michael Brauer – mixing engineer (2–5, 8, 9, 11)
- Tom Lord-Alge – mixing engineer (1) (reissue)
- Branden Albein – assistant engineer
- Jeffrey Reed – assistant engineer
- Jim Champagne – assistant engineer
- Lawrence – assistant engineer
- Tony Rivera – assistant engineer
- Bruce Jacoby – drum technician
- Gersh Drums – drum technician
- Jonathan Poneman – executive producer
