= Miami (Izzy Stradlin album) =

Studio album by Izzy Stradlin
- Released: May 30, 2007
- Recorded: Criteria Studios, Miami; December 2006
- Genre: Blues rock, Southern rock, hard rock
- Length: 49:33
- Label: Internet Release

Izzy Stradlin chronology
Like a Dog (2005)	Miami (2007)	Fire, the Acoustic Album (2007)

Miami is the seventh studio album by former Guns N' Roses guitarist Izzy Stradlin, originally released on May 30, 2007.

Dummer Taz Bentley said: "We had such a good time recording this one. We did it before Christmas and when we got back home decided it was so much fun that we should go back and do some more."

== Background ==
According to drummer Taz Bently, the album sessions date back to 2005–2006, describing them as "loose" and focused on "jamming the songs out a pinch more than normal." The album was re-released on July 24, as Izzy Stradlin and bassist JT Longoria remixed the album in Dallas' Nomad Studios for a "much louder and more powerful sounding" edition.

== Track listing ==
All lyrics and music by Izzy Stradlin.

1. "Tijuana" - 3:41
2. "Buildings In The Sky" - 5:23
3. "Let Go" - 5:26
4. "Junior's Song" - 2:28
5. "Partly Cloudy" - 9:30
6. "Waiting" - 4:30
7. "Bombs Away" - 3:53
8. "Tuff Check" - 3:40
9. "Phone" - 3:19
10. "Everythings Alright" - 7:38
11. "FSO Ragga" - 6:54 (Not included on remix)

== Personnel ==
- Izzy Stradlin - vocals, rhythm guitar, lead guitar on "Phone"
- Rick Richards - lead guitar
- JT Longoria - bass guitar
- Taz Bentley - drums
- Joey Huffman - keyboards
