= Jimmy Ashhurst =

Musician and songwriter

- Born: James Ashhurst; Naples, Italy
- Genres: Hard rock; blues rock; punk rock; heavy metal
- Occupations: Multi-instrumentalist; vocalist; songwriter
- Instruments: Bass guitar; guitar; mandolin; vocals
- Labels: MCA; Geffen; Atlantic

Jimmy Ashhurst is a Los Angeles-based multi-instrumentalist, vocalist, and songwriter. Credited as a bassist, guitarist, mandolinist, composer and vocalist, Ashhurst has played with artists including Stiv Bators, Black Crowes, Broken Homes, Buckcherry, Izzy Stradlin and the Ju Ju Hounds. He has also performed with Johnny Thunders, Mick Ronson, and Ronnie Wood, among others.

Ashhurst was nominated for a Grammy Award in the Best Hard Rock Performance category as the bassist for Buckcherry in 2008.
