= Believe in Me (Duff McKagan album) =

Studio album by Duff McKagan
- Released: September 14, 1993
- Recorded: 1993
- Genre: Hard rock
- Label: Geffen
- Producers: Duff McKagan; Jim Mitchell

Duff McKagan chronology
Believe in Me (1993)	Tenderness (2019)

Singles from Believe in Me
- 1. "Believe in Me" Released: 1993

Professional ratings
Review scores
Source	Rating
AllMusic	2.5/5 stars

Believe in Me is the first solo album by American rock and roll musician Duff McKagan, released on September 14, 1993. Though McKagan came to prominence as the bass guitarist for Guns 'N' Roses, on this record he also sang and performed most of the instruments. The album peaked at number 137 on the Billboard 200 and is believed to have sold about 100,000 copies worldwide.

== Recording ==
Believe in Me features McKagan's Guns N' Roses bandmates Slash, Matt Sorum, Dizzy Reed and Gilby Clarke plus Skid Row members Sebastian Bach, Rob Affuso and Dave Sabo, Lenny Kravitz and Jeff Beck.

"I haven't really listened to it," Slash admitted. "I heard it when he was making it. I mean, I don't listen to our records when they're finished either."

"You Can't Put Your Arms Around a Memory", from the Guns N' Roses album "The Spaghetti Incident?", was recorded during sessions for this album.

"Man in the Meadow" is an elegy to McKagan's late friend Todd Crew of Jetboy.

== Promotion ==
In 1993, a three-track single "Believe in Me" was released with B-sides "Bambi" (a cover of Prince) and "Cracked Actor" (a cover of David Bowie). The promo singles "Punk Rock Song", "Man in the Meadow" and "I Love You" were also released.

A music video for the song "Believe in Me" was also released in 1993 and received minimal airplay on MTV. It is mostly compiled of low-quality videos of Duff McKagan during his touring and recording time.

== Track listing ==
All songs written by Duff McKagan except "Bambi" written by Prince and "Cracked Actor" written by David Bowie

1. "Believe in Me" (featuring Slash) – 3:23
2. "I Love You" – 4:14
3. "Man in the Meadow" (featuring West Arkeen) – 4:50
4. "(Fucked Up) Beyond Belief" (featuring Jeff Beck and Matt Sorum) – 3:29
5. "Could It Be U" (featuring Dizzy Reed) – 3:04
6. "Just Not There" (featuring Slash) – 3:34
7. "Punk Rock Song" – 1:37
8. "The Majority" (featuring Lenny Kravitz) – 3:10
9. "10 Years" (featuring Gilby Clarke) – 4:29
10. "Swamp Song" (featuring Jeff Beck) – 3:04
11. "Trouble" (featuring Sebastian Bach and Dave "The Snake" Sabo) – 3:12
12. "Fuck You" (featuring Doc from Dox Haus Mob) – 3:24
13. "Lonely Tonite" (featuring Dave "The Snake" Sabo) – 3:03

Bonus tracks on 2009 Japanese reissue

14. "Bambi" – 3:30
  - B-side to "Believe in Me" single
15. "Cracked Actor" – 3:20
  - B-side to "Believe in Me" single

== Personnel ==
- Duff McKagan – lead vocals, rhythm guitar, acoustic guitar, bass, synthesizer, piano, drums, backing vocals
- Joie Mastrokalos – lead guitar (touring band member), backing vocals on "Swamp Song" and "Fuck You"
- Richard Duguay – bass (touring band member)
- Aaron Brooks – drums (touring band member)
- Teddy Andreadis – organ, clavinet
- Slash – lead guitar on "Believe in Me" and "Just Not There"
- Dizzy Reed – piano, farfisa organ, backing vocals on "Could It Be You"
- Matt Sorum – drums on "(Fucked Up) Beyond Belief"
- Gilby Clarke – lead and rhythm guitar and backing vocals on "10 Years"
- Jeff Beck – lead guitar on "(Fucked Up) Beyond Belief" and "Swamp Song"
- Lenny Kravitz – vocals on "The Majority"
- Sebastian Bach – vocals on "Trouble"
- Dave "The Snake" Sabo – guitar on "Trouble" and "Lonely Tonite"
- West Arkeen – guitar on "Man in the Meadow", "Swamp Song" and "Fuck You"
- Rob Affuso – drums on "Swamp Song" and "Fuck You"
- Bobbie Brown – backing vocals on "Believe in Me"
- London McDaniel – bridge vocals on "Man in the Meadow", percussion on "The Majority"
- Doc Newmann – rap vocals on "Fuck You"

== Charts ==
Chart performance for Believe in Me
Chart (1993)	Peak position
Australian Albums (ARIA)	86
Austrian Albums (Ö3 Austria)	89
German Albums (Offizielle Top 100)	78
Hungarian Albums (MAHASZ)	28
Swedish Albums (Sverigetopplistan)	11
Swiss Albums (Schweizer Hitparade)	32
UK Albums (Official Charts)	27
US Billboard 200	137
