= Ride On (Izzy Stradlin album) =

Studio album by Izzy Stradlin
- Released: November 1999
- Studio: The Complex, Los Angeles
- Genre: Rock and roll
- Length: 37:38
- Label: Universal
- Producer: Izzy Stradlin

Izzy Stradlin chronology
117° (1998)	Ride On (1999)	River (2001)

Ride On is the third studio album by American rock musician Izzy Stradlin. The album features Duff McKagan, Stradlin's former Guns N' Roses bandmate, on bass guitar.

Professional ratings
Review scores
Source	Rating
AllMusic	3/5 stars

== Track listing ==
All lyrics and music by Izzy Stradlin except "The Groper," co-written with Rick Richards.

1. "Ride On" - 5:27
2. "California" - 3:26
3. "Spazed" - 3:40
4. "Primitive Man" - 2:43
5. "Trance Mission" - 3:39
6. "Needles" - 4:06
7. "The Groper" - 3:33
8. "Here Comes The Rain" - 3:56
9. "Hometown" - 4:10
10. "Highway Zero" - 2:58

== Personnel ==
- Izzy Stradlin - lead vocals, rhythm guitar, lead guitar on "California"
- Rick Richards - lead guitar
- Duff McKagan - bass guitar
- Taz Bentley - drums
