= Concrete (Izzy Stradlin album) =

Studio album by Izzy Stradlin
- Released: July 17, 2008
- Recorded: Spring 2008
- Genre: Rock and roll
- Length: 35:49

Izzy Stradlin chronology
Fire, the Acoustic Album (2007)	Concrete (2008)	Smoke (2009)

Professional ratings
Review scores
Source	Rating
AllMusic	3/5 stars

Concrete is the ninth studio album by former Guns N' Roses guitarist Izzy Stradlin. The album continues the iTunes-exclusive pattern, and was released in 2008.

== Track listing ==
All lyrics and music by Izzy Stradlin.

1. "Ball" - 3:06
2. "Circle" - 3:49
3. "Easy" - 3:11
4. "Concrete" - 4:57
5. "Drove" - 4:04
6. "Ship" - 2:52
7. "G.B." - 3:08
8. "Knuckleheads" - 2:15
9. "I Know" - 2:52
10. "Raggadubbacrete" - 5:34

== Personnel ==
- Izzy Stradlin - lead vocals, rhythm guitar
- Rick Richards - lead guitar
- JT Longoria - bass
- Taz Bentley - drums

Additional personnel

- Duff McKagan - bass on three songs (only confirmed on the title track)
