= On Down the Road =

On Down The Road

Studio album by Izzy Stradlin
- Released: August 21, 2002
- Recorded: Rumbo Recorders (Los Angeles)
- Genre: Rock and roll
- Length: 35:23
- Label: JVC – Victor
- Producer: Izzy Stradlin

Izzy Stradlin chronology
| River (2001) | On Down The Road (2002) | Like a Dog (2005) |

On Down the Road is the fifth studio album by former Guns N' Roses guitarist Izzy Stradlin, released on August 21, 2002. It was recorded at Rumbo Recorders in Los Angeles and produced by Stradlin.

== Reception ==
Professional ratings
Review scores
| Source | Rating |
|---|---|
| AllMusic | 3.5/5 stars |

Greg Prato of AllMusic described On down the Road as an album which "certainly won't get any awards for the most original-sounding or stylistically groundbreaking rock release of 2002". But it "accomplishes its goal" by "creating familiar vintage rock sounds".

== Track listing ==
All lyrics and music by Izzy Stradlin, except where noted.

1. "You Betcha" - 2:43
2. "Gone Dead Train" (Jack Nitzsche/Russ Titelman) - 3:11
3. "Monkeys" - 3:58
4. "On Down the Road" - 3:35
5. "Sweet Caress" - 3:36
6. "Coke’n" - 3:35
7. "Got Some News" - 3:51
8. "Way to Go" - 3:51
9. "Please Go Home" (Mick Jagger/Keith Richards) - 3:25
10. "Lot to Learn" - 3:38

=== iTunes release ===
1. "You Betcha" - 2:43
2. "Monkeys" - 3:58
3. "On Down the Road" - 3:35
4. "Sweet Caress" - 3:36
5. "Coke’n" - 3:35
6. "Got Some News" - 3:51
7. "Way to Go" - 3:51
8. "Lot to Learn" - 3:39

== Personnel ==
- Izzy Stradlin - lead vocals, rhythm guitar, acoustic guitar
- Rick Richards - lead guitar, backing vocals
- Duff McKagan - bass
- Taz Bentley - drums
- Ian McLagan - keyboards
