= River (Izzy Stradlin album) =

Studio album by Izzy Stradlin
- Released: May 21, 2001
- Studios: Rumbo (Canoga Park, California); Robert Lang (Shoreline, Washington); Arlyn (Austin, Texas)
- Genres: Rock and roll, folk rock, reggae fusion
- Length: 36:27
- Label: Sanctuary Records
- Producer: Izzy Stradlin

Izzy Stradlin chronology
Ride On (1999)	River (2001)	On Down the Road (2002)

Professional ratings
Review scores
Source	Rating
AllMusic	3.5/5 stars

River is the fourth studio album by former Guns N' Roses guitarist Izzy Stradlin, and his third to feature ex-Guns N' Roses bass guitarist Duff McKagan.

== Track listing ==
All lyrics and music by Izzy Stradlin, except where noted.

1. "Jump In Now" (Stradlin/Rick Richards) - 4:47
2. "Head On Out" - 3:29
3. "River" - 3:47
4. "Far Below Me Now" - 3:26
5. "What I Told You" - 3:22
6. "Get Away" - 3:09
7. "Underground" - 2:54
8. "Shall Walk" - 3:32
9. "Run-In" - 4:26
10. "Feelin’ Alright" - 3:35

== Personnel ==
- Izzy Stradlin – vocals, rhythm guitar
- Rick Richards – lead guitar, slide guitar
- Duff McKagan – bass, acoustic guitar
- Taz Bentley – drums
- Ian McLagan – keyboards
