= Like a Dog (album) =

Studio album by Izzy Stradlin
- Released: October 2005
- Recorded: April–May 2003 at Nomad Recording Studios
- Studios: Nomad Studio, TX
- Genre: Hard rock
- Length: 35:08
- Label: Internet Release
- Producer: Izzy Stradlin

Izzy Stradlin chronology
| On Down the Road (2002) | Like a Dog (2005) | Miami (2007) |

Like a Dog is the sixth studio album by former Guns N' Roses guitarist Izzy Stradlin, released independently in October 2005.

== Background ==
The tracks were recorded at Nomad Recording Studios, Carrollton, Texas in April and May 2003, but the album was not released at that time. Eventually, a fan submitted a petition of more than 1,000 signatures to release the album. As a result, Stradlin released the album on the now-defunct Scootersteez website. Later, the album was released on iTunes. As a result, Stradlin released his new albums exclusively to iTunes.

== Track listing ==
All lyrics and music by Izzy Stradlin, except where noted.

1. “Bomb” - 3:42
2. “Hammerhead” - 2:11
3. “Snafu” - 1:57
4. “Hell Song” - 2:57
5. “Rollin’ On” - 2:52
6. “Just Don’t Know” - 4:00
7. “Chop Away” (Stradlin/Rick Richards) - 3:31
8. “Win U Lose” - 2:45
9. “On the Run” - 4:23
10. “Like a Dog” - 3:20
11. Hidden track - 3:30

== Personnel ==
- Izzy Stradlin – lead vocals, rhythm guitar (left), bass, producer
- Rick Richards – lead guitar, slide guitar, rhythm guitar (right)
- JT Longoria – bass (tracks 2 and 7)
- Taz Bentley – drums, percussion
