= Duff McKagan =

American musician (born 1964)

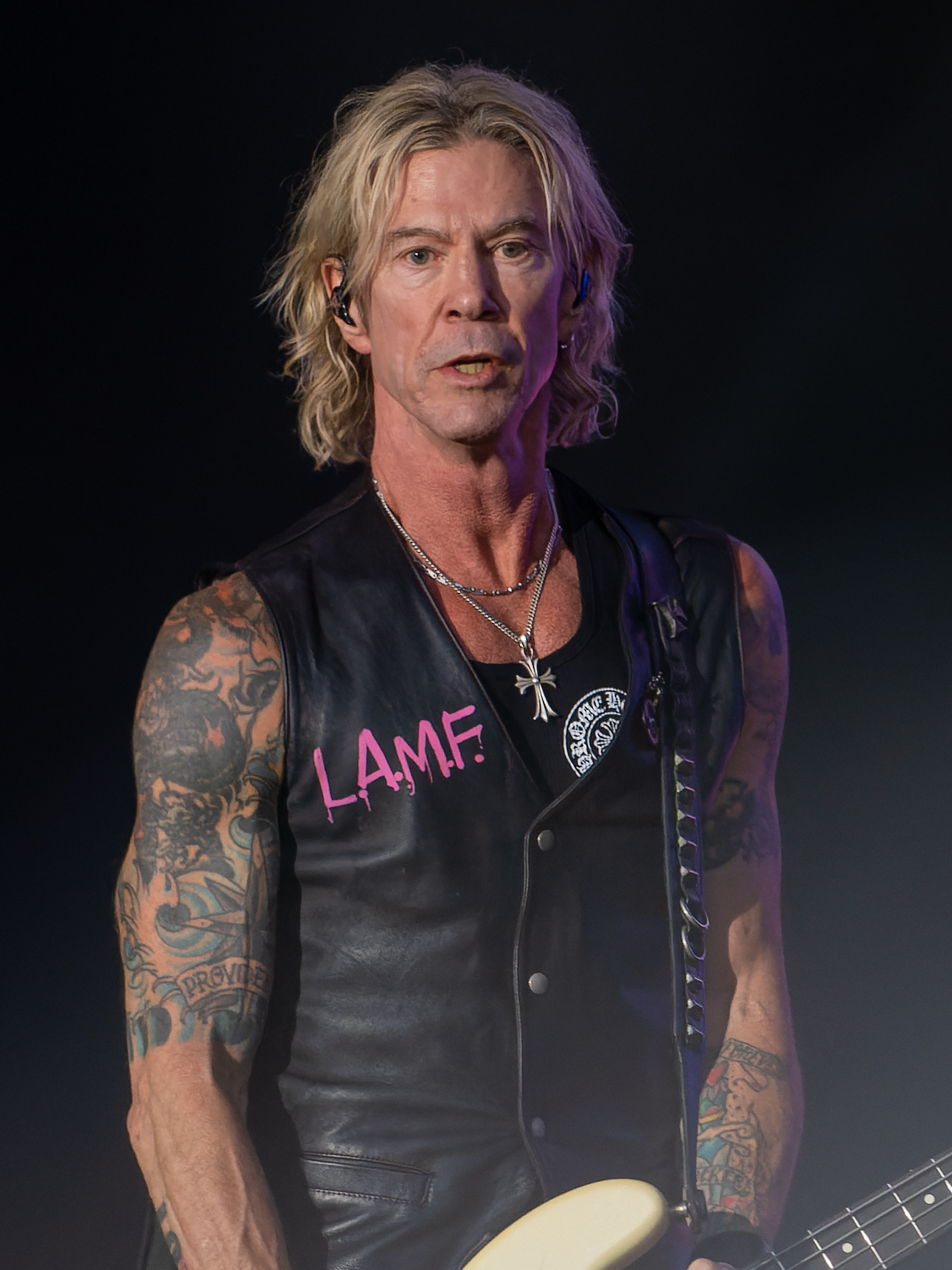
- McKagan in 2023

Background information
- Also known as: Duff "Rose" McKagan
- Born: Michael Andrew McKagan; February 5, 1964 (age 62); Seattle, Washington, U.S.
- Genres: Hard rock, punk rock, heavy metal, blues rock, glam metal, punk blues
- Occupation: Musician
- Instruments: Bass guitar; vocals
- Years active: 1979–present
- Member of: Guns N' Roses
- Formerly of: Velvet Revolver; Hollywood Vampires; Neurotic Outsiders; Loaded; 10 Minute Warning; The Fartz; Fastbacks; The Gentlemen; Jane's Addiction; Walking Papers; The Living
- Website: duffmckagan.com

Michael Andrew "Duff" McKagan (born February 5, 1964) is an American musician. He was the bassist of hard rock band Guns N' Roses for 12 years, with whom he achieved worldwide success in the late 1980s and early 1990s. McKagan rejoined the band in 2016, following their induction into the Rock and Roll Hall of Fame.

Toward the end of his first tenure with Guns N' Roses, McKagan released the solo album Believe in Me (1993) and formed the short-lived supergroup Neurotic Outsiders. Following his departure from Guns N' Roses in 1997, McKagan briefly reunited with his pre-success Seattle punk band 10 Minute Warning, before forming the hard rock band Loaded, in which he performs lead vocals and rhythm guitar. Between 2002 and 2008, he played bass in the supergroup Velvet Revolver with his former Guns N' Roses bandmates Slash and Matt Sorum. He briefly performed with Alice in Chains in 2006, with Jane's Addiction in 2010, and with the supergroup Hollywood Vampires in 2016. He has also collaborated in several short-lived projects with fellow Seattle-native musicians Mike McCready (primarily of Pearl Jam) and Barrett Martin (formerly of Screaming Trees), including Walking Papers and Levee Walkers.

In addition to his musical career, McKagan has established himself as a writer. He has written weekly columns on a wide variety of topics for SeattleWeekly.com, Playboy.com, and ESPN.com. Previously a high school dropout, he attended Seattle University's Albers School of Business and Economics in the early 2000s, and subsequently founded the wealth management firm Meridian Rock.

== Early life ==
Michael Andrew McKagan was born February 5, 1964, and grew up in Seattle's Bryant neighborhood, the youngest of eight children born to Marie and Elmer "Mac" McKagan. He has been called "Duff" since toddlerhood; he has referred to the nickname as "an Irish thing". Following his parents' divorce, his mother supported the family by taking a job as a medical stenographer. His brother Bruce taught him how to play bass and he further developed his skills by playing along with the albums 1999 by Prince and Damaged by Black Flag. In his autobiography It's So Easy (And Other Lies), McKagan wrote that he fashioned himself after punk bassists such as Barry Adamson of Magazine and Paul Simonon of the Clash, and also Lemmy Kilmister of Motörhead.

Although an honors student, McKagan dropped out of Roosevelt High School in the tenth grade. He then worked as a pastry chef for the Great American Food and Beverage Company while earning his GED. He was later awarded an honorary diploma after speaking at the class of 2012's graduation ceremony.

== Career ==
=== 1979–1985: early years ===
In 1979, at the age of 15, McKagan formed the punk band The Vains, in which he played bass. During this time he performed under the stage name Nico Teen. The band released one single, "School Jerks", in 1980.

In 1980, McKagan joined the pop-punk band The Fastbacks as their drummer. He first performed with the band in December 1980, and appeared on their 1981 debut single "It's Your Birthday", which was issued on guitarist Kurt Bloch's label No Threes Records. He was later on the song "Someone Else's Room", which was included on the Seattle Syndrome: Volume One compilation album, also released in 1981. His last performance was in July 1981.

Around this time he also played lead guitar in the punk band The Living, which opened shows for Hüsker Dü and D.O.A., which developed a devoted following. In 1982 they recorded an EP, which remained unreleased until April 2021, under the title 1982.

In 1982, McKagan became the drummer for the hardcore punk band The Fartz, with whom he recorded several demos, five of which were included on their 1990 album You, We See You Crawling. After several line-up changes, The Fartz evolved into the post-punk band 10 Minute Warning, for which McKagan played guitar.

In Autumn 1984, McKagan moved to Los Angeles, California, with one of his brothers where he found work as an appetizer server at a Black Angus restaurant in Northridge, Los Angeles. Answering an ad for a bass guitarist in a local newspaper, he met guitarist Slash and drummer Steven Adler, with whom he formed the short-lived band Road Crew. They auditioned a number of singers, including one-time Black Flag vocalist Ron Reyes, and worked on material that included the main riff of what would become the Guns N' Roses song "Rocket Queen". Slash eventually disbanded the group due to them not being able to find a singer, as well as Adler's lack of work ethic compared to himself and McKagan.

=== 1985–1997: Guns N' Roses, Believe in Me and Neurotic Outsiders ===
Duff in 1987

In March 1985, McKagan replaced bassist Ole Beich in Guns N' Roses, which was newly founded by singer Axl Rose, rhythm guitarist Izzy Stradlin of Hollywood Rose, lead guitarist Tracii Guns and drummer Rob Gardner of L.A. Guns. McKagan's Road Crew bandmates Slash and Steven Adler joined the band two months later, after Guns and Gardner quit respectively. After two days of rehearsal, the line-up played its debut gig at The Troubadour on June 6. In 1987, Guns N' Roses released its debut album, Appetite for Destruction, which to date has sold over 28 million copies worldwide, 18 million of which were in the United States, making it the best-selling debut album of all time in the U.S. The following year, the band released G N' R Lies, which sold over five million copies in the U.S. alone, despite containing only eight tracks, four of which were included on the previously released EP Live ?!*@ Like a Suicide.

In May 1991, Guns N' Roses embarked on the two-and-a-half-year-long Use Your Illusion Tour. The following September, the band released the long-awaited albums Use Your Illusion I and Use Your Illusion II, which debuted at No. 2 and No. 1 respectively on the U.S. chart, a feat unachieved by any other group. In 1993, the band released "The Spaghetti Incident?", a cover album of mostly punk songs, which proved less successful than its predecessors. McKagan took on lead vocals on four songs, including live favorite "Attitude", originally by the Misfits. That same year, McKagan released his debut solo album Believe in Me, on which he sang lead vocals and played virtually every instrument.

On April 3, 1993, while touring with Guns N' Roses, McKagan was hit in the head with a beer bottle filled with urine thrown by a fan in Sacramento, California. He was sent to the hospital minutes later. Axl Rose said this to the crowd after McKagan was hit:

"I hate to ruin your fun, and our fun, but somebody just hit Duff in the head with a bottle, and now he's not able to play." "So we're sorry, have a good night. And if you find the asshole, kill him."

Rose threw the mic over his shoulder and walked off the stage.

In 1995, with Guns N' Roses largely inactive, McKagan formed the supergroup Neurotic Outsiders with Steve Jones of the Sex Pistols, John Taylor of Duran Duran, and his Guns N' Roses bandmate Matt Sorum. Originally a gathering of friends jamming together at the Viper Room in Hollywood, they released their self-titled album on Maverick Records in 1996. The band played a brief tour of Europe and North America, before disbanding in 1997. McKagan was the last member of the Appetite for Destruction lineup to leave Guns N' Roses, resigning as bassist in August 1997. McKagan had recently become a father and wrote about his decision to leave in his autobiography, stating "Guns had been paying rent on studios for three years now—from 1994 to 1997—and still did not have a single song. The whole operation was so erratic that it didn't seem to fit with my hopes for parenthood, for stability."

=== 1997–2002: 10 Minute Warning reunion, Beautiful Disease and Loaded ===
Following his departure from Guns N' Roses in 1997, McKagan moved back to Seattle, where he met with many of his old friends, including Pearl Jam's Stone Gossard, who convinced him to reunite 10 Minute Warning. Singer Christopher Blue was brought in to replace Steve Verwolf, who was serving a term in federal prison. In 1998, the band released their self-titled album on Sub Pop. The album featured nine tracks, including two new versions of songs originally recorded by The Fartz, namely "Is This the Way?" and "Buried". 10 Minute Warning played its last show on August 22, 1998, at the Roseland theater in Portland, Oregon.

McKagan's second solo album, Beautiful Disease, was intended to be released in 1999, but became lost in the legal shuffle of the merge between Geffen Records and Interscope Records. McKagan was dropped from Geffen's roster, and subsequently lost all commercial rights to release the record. For the tour supporting his ill-fated solo album, he formed the band Loaded, which consisted of McKagan on bass and vocals, Dez Cadena, formerly of Black Flag, on guitar, Michael Barragan, formerly of Plexi, on guitar, and Taz Bentley, formerly of The Reverend Horton Heat, on drums. Loaded independently released the live record Episode 1999: Live, before disbanding in late 1999.

In 2000, McKagan reformed Loaded, remaining as the lead vocalist but switching from bass to rhythm guitar, and adding drummer Geoff Reading of Green Apple Quick Step, guitarist Mike Squires of Harvey Danger, and bassist Jeff Rouse of Alien Crime Syndicate. Both Squires and Rouse joined after the recording of the band's debut album, Dark Days, released in 2001. Dave Dederer, formerly of The Presidents of the United States of America, took up recording duties for the album.

In 2002, while on tour, both Squires and Rouse left Loaded to join the reformed Alien Crime Syndicate. Former Wasted Youth and Electric Love Hogs guitarist Dave Kushner and former Burning Witch bassist George Stuart Dahlquist were brought in to replace them. McKagan and Kushner went on to form Velvet Revolver, putting Loaded on hiatus.

=== 2002–2010: Velvet Revolver, Alice in Chains, Loaded reunion, Jane's Addiction ===
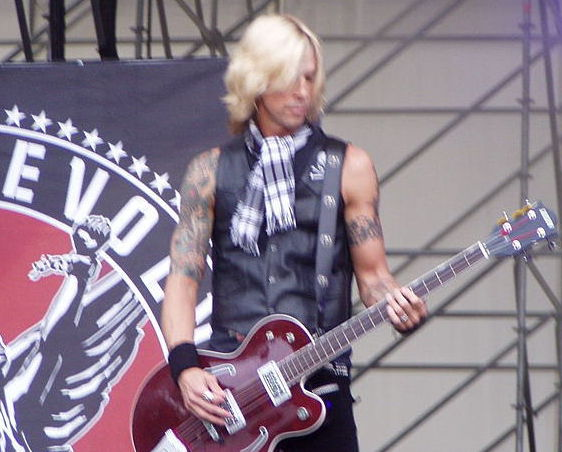
McKagan with Velvet Revolver at Gods of Metal in 2007

In 2002, McKagan founded the supergroup Velvet Revolver with his former Guns N' Roses bandmates Slash and Matt Sorum, and Loaded guitarist Dave Kushner. Stone Temple Pilots singer Scott Weiland completed the line-up. In 2004, they released their debut album Contraband, which debuted at No. 1 on the U.S. chart and sold two million copies. In 2005, the band was nominated for three Grammys, Rock Album of the Year, Rock Song, and Hard Rock Performance for their Contraband single Slither which won their first and only Grammy. Their second album, Libertad, was released in 2007 to mixed reviews; it failed to achieve the same commercial success as its predecessor. The band toured extensively, until Weiland left in April 2008 to reunite with Stone Temple Pilots. Velvet Revolver has been on hiatus since Weiland's departure.

In 2006, McKagan temporarily joined Alice in Chains as a rhythm guitarist, performing with the band for the first time at VH1's Decades Rock Live! concert honoring Heart, and later during their reunion tour.

McKagan subsequently reunited Loaded, with Mike Squires and Jeff Rouse returning to the group, and the same year, they released the EP Wasted Heart. In 2009, the band released its second studio album, Sick, and embarked on tours with Mötley Crüe and Black Stone Cherry. Later that year, Geoff Reading departed the band; he was replaced by Isaac Carpenter.

In 2010, McKagan briefly joined Jane's Addiction, with lead guitarist Dave Navarro originally confirming that McKagan had joined the band on a permanent basis. On joining the band, McKagan stated, "Something like a chance to write, record, and perhaps even perform with a band of the quality of Jane's Addiction does not come around every day. I have a lot of respect for this band and the guys in it." He worked on several songs with Jane's Addiction and played four shows with the band—two in Los Angeles, and two in Europe, including one at Rock in Rio in Madrid.

On September 6, six months after McKagan joined the band, Jane's Addiction announced that they had parted ways due to the fact that "musically [they] were all headed in different directions."

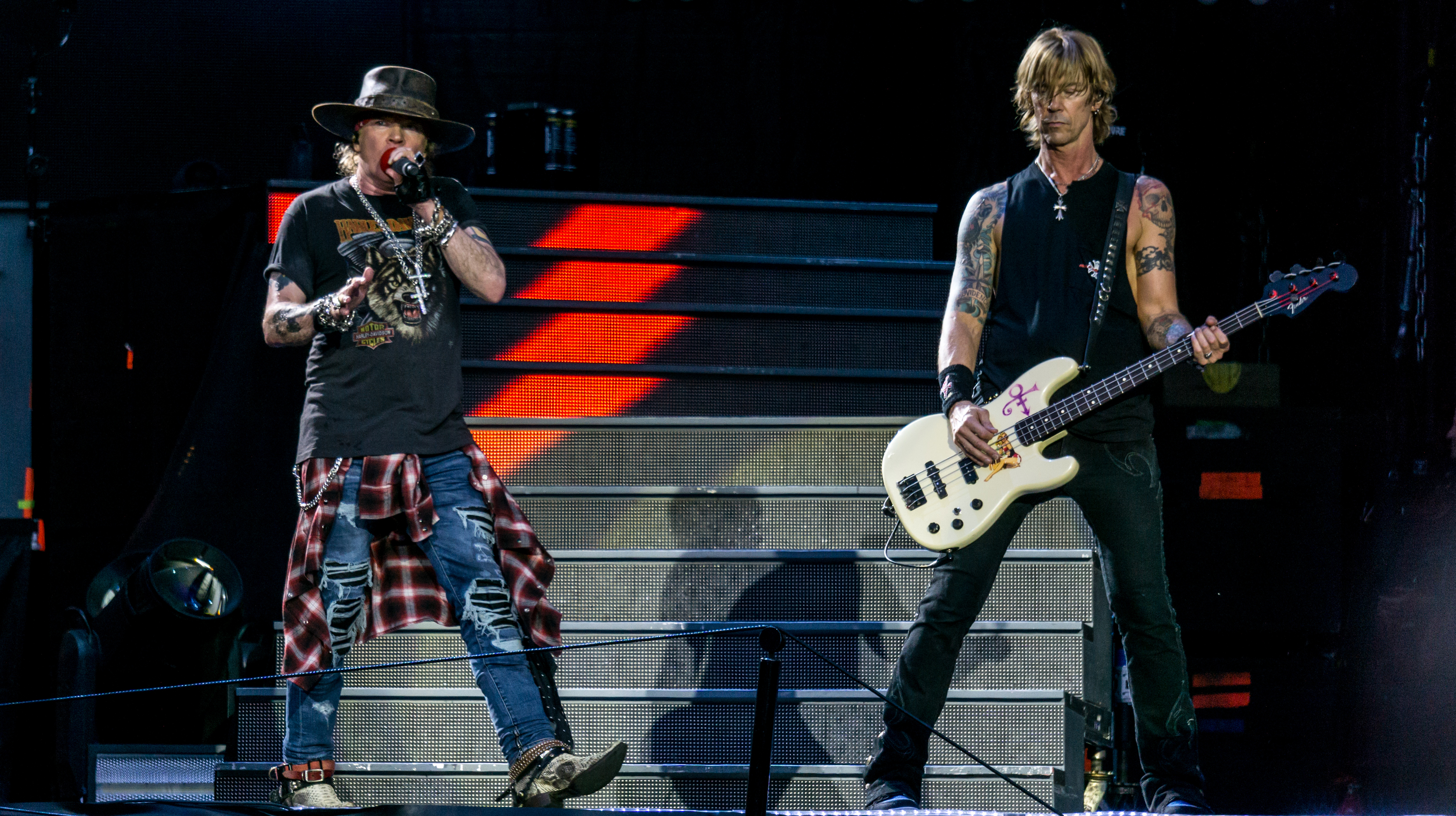
McKagan and Axl Rose during the Not in This Lifetime... Tour in 2017

=== 2010–present: Kings of Chaos, his book, Walking Papers, return to Guns N' Roses, Tenderness and Max Creeps ===
On October 14, 2010, McKagan appeared on stage with Guns N' Roses for the first time since 1993 at The O2 Arena in London. He played bass on "You Could Be Mine", electric guitar on "Nice Boys" and "Knockin' on Heaven's Door", and acoustic guitar and tambourine on "Patience". McKagan then returned to Loaded, with whom he recorded a third studio album, The Taking, which was released in 2011. Loaded twice served as opening act for Guns N' Roses in December of that year, with McKagan again briefly joining his old band on stage.

It's So Easy *And Other Lies* is the title of McKagan's book released in 2011 in which he tells his view and perspectives on stories encountered during his career.

On April 14, 2012, McKagan was inducted into the Rock and Roll Hall of Fame as a member of the classic lineup of Guns N' Roses.

In 2012, McKagan went on tour with the Rock N Roll All Stars, a band that consisted of many of rock's most recognized performers. The band downsized and became the Kings Of Chaos in 2013. The primary members with McKagan are Joe Elliott of Def Leppard and Joe Elliott's Down N' Outz, Matt Sorum of Guns N' Roses and Velvet Revolver, Gilby Clarke of Guns N' Roses and Steve Stevens of Billy Idol's band. Others who round out the group are: Glenn Hughes of Deep Purple fame and Sebastian Bach, formerly of Skid Row. The band released the cover song "Never Before" by Deep Purple.

Also in 2012 McKagan formed the band Walking Papers with former The Missionary Position members, played on the self-titled debut album and toured with them in 2013.

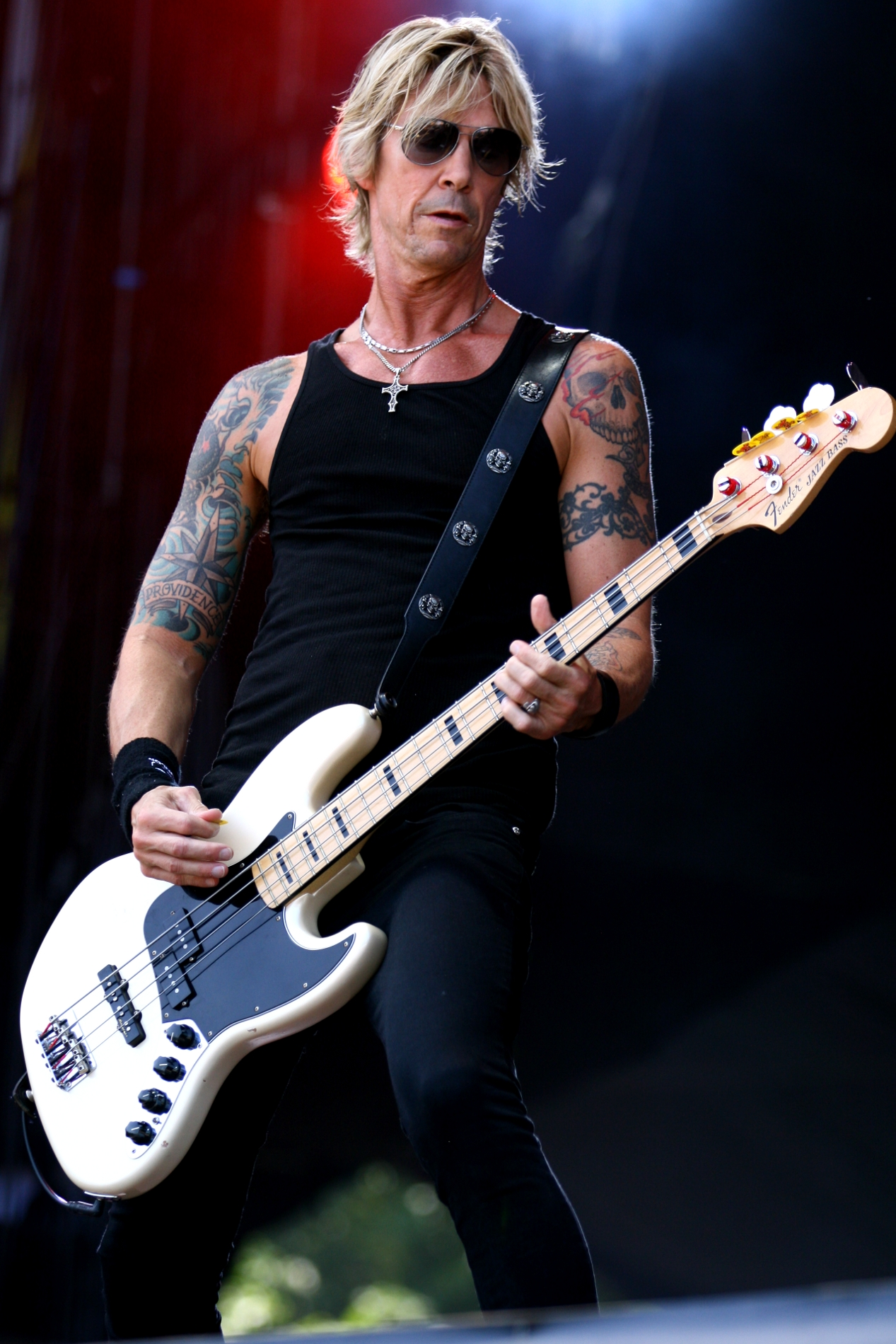
McKagan performing in 2014

In 2014, McKagan again briefly reunited with Guns N' Roses. He played five full shows in South America, filling in for Tommy Stinson. McKagan subsequently played with Guns N' Roses at the Revolver Golden Gods Awards show in Los Angeles. During Guns N' Roses' spring 2014 residency at The Joint in Las Vegas, McKagan played another full concert with the band.

In 2016, McKagan was announced (alongside Slash), as having returned to Guns N' Roses to headline Coachella. After playing a secret warmup gig at the Troubadour in Los Angeles on April 1, 2016, The band embarked on the Not in This Lifetime... Tour.

On December 5, 2018, it was announced that McKagan is currently in production for a new solo album to be released in 2019. On March 10, 2019, McKagan revealed that the album, Tenderness, would be released on May 31 and also released a track from the album titled "Chip Away".

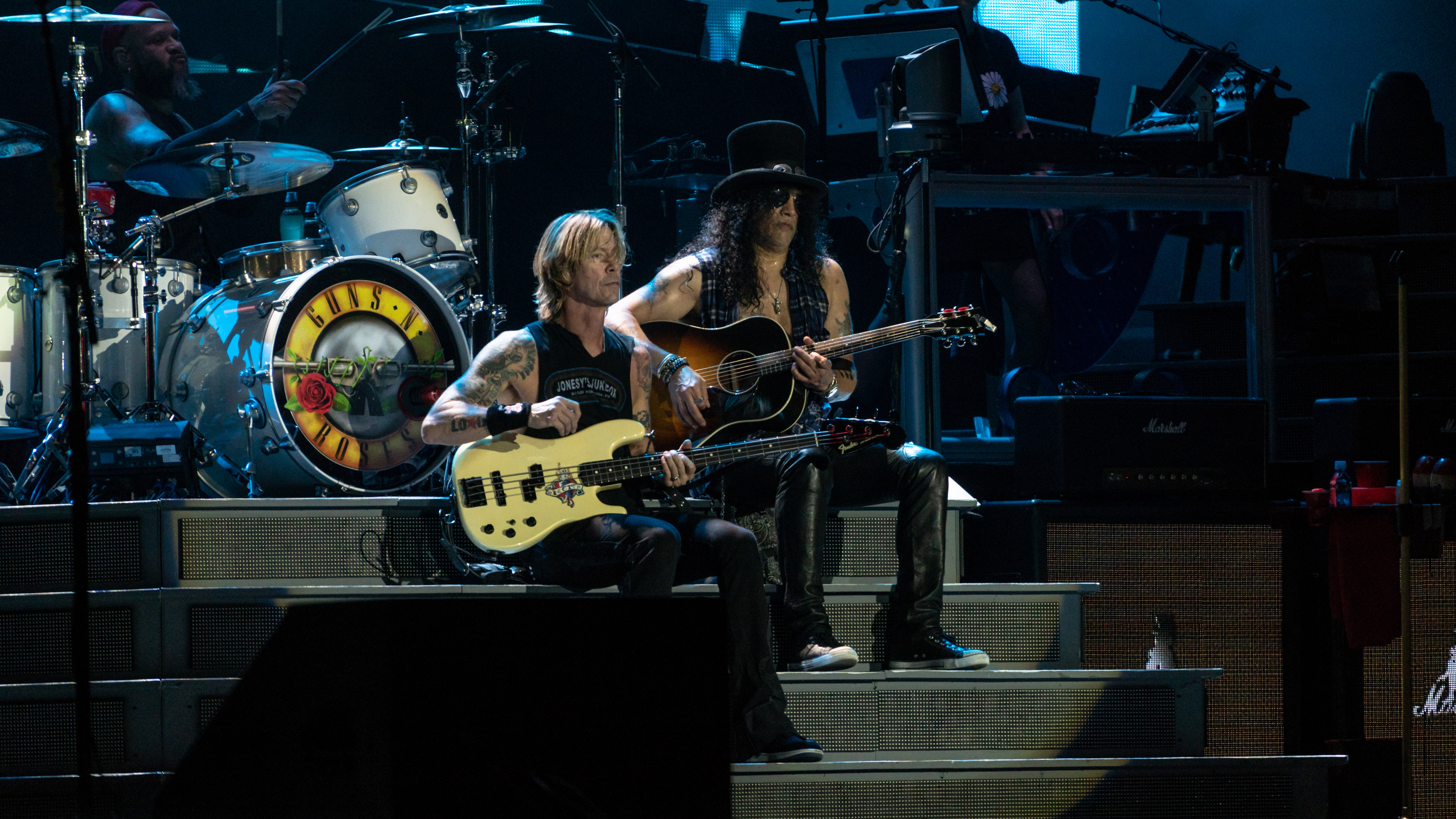
McKagan alongside Slash in 2018

In April 2022 various famous artists, like Slash, Billie Joe Armstrong, Henry Rollins, and McKagan himself, publicly bemoaned the breakup of a mysterious legendary Seattle band called Max Creeps. In the following weeks, it turned out to be a guerilla marketing campaign for a new project, involving McKagan and Fastbacks singer Kurt Bloch, but so far this hasn't been officially confirmed. Max Creeps released two singles, "The Internet Killed Me" and "Hung, Drawn and Quartered". On May 13 Max Creeps released their 'second' album "Nein" on Velocity Records, though no evidence exists that there ever was a first album.

In December 2025, McKagan, Slash, Andrew Watt, and Chad Smith performed under the band name The Dirty Bats. They were joined onstage by Bruno Mars, Brandi Carlile, Anthony Kiedis, Yungblud, and Eddie Vedder.

=== Session work ===
In 1990, McKagan and Slash co-wrote and played several songs on Iggy Pop's Brick by Brick. In 1995, he collaborated with Slash on his solo project Slash's Snakepit; he co-wrote "Beggars and Hangers-On" off their album It's Five O'Clock Somewhere, which he played live during a Snakepit show in May of that year. In 1998, McKagan collaborated with his former Guns N' Roses bandmate Izzy Stradlin on his solo album 117°. The following year, he played on Stradlin's album Ride On, and joined him on a tour of Japan supporting the album. Also in 1999, he contributed to the album Humanary Stew: A Tribute to Alice Cooper, an Alice Cooper tribute album. In 2001, McKagan played on the album Skyjin by Zilch, Mark Lanegan's solo album Field Songs, and Izzy Stradlin's album River. The following year, he played on Stradlin's album On Down the Road. In 2004, he again collaborated with Mark Lanegan on his album Bubblegum, along with Stradlin.

McKagan played on three tracks off Izzy Stradlin's 2008 album Concrete, including the title track, as well as seven songs off his album Wave of Heat, which was released in 2010. Also in 2010, McKagan appeared on Slash's eponymous debut solo album; he played on the track "Watch This" with Dave Grohl on drums. That year, he also made a guest appearance—along with Slash and Matt Sorum—on Macy Gray's album The Sellout, and appeared on the Manic Street Preachers song "A Billion Balconies Facing the Sun" off their album Postcards From a Young Man.

In 2020, McKagan played bass and cowrote five songs on Ozzy Osbourne's album Ordinary Man, along with Red Hot Chili Peppers drummer Chad Smith. McKagan's Guns N' Roses bandmate Slash is featured on the song "Straight to Hell", which also features co-writer Andrew Watt of California Breed fame.

In 2021, McKagan played bass on Jerry Cantrell's album Brighten.

In 2022, McKagan performed on and co-wrote three songs on Iggy Pop's album Every Loser. To promote the album, McKagan will be part of Pop's backing band named The Losers which consists of Chad Smith, Josh Klinghoffer and Andrew Watt.

=== Other ventures ===
McKagan has two minor acting credits; in 1988, he appeared with his Guns N' Roses bandmates in the Dirty Harry film The Dead Pool, and in 1997, he played a rocker vampire in an episode of the television series Sliders. In 1999, he appeared in Anthony Scarpa's documentary film Betty Blowtorch and Her Amazing True Life Adventures, which focuses on the all-female hard rock band Betty Blowtorch, whose debut EP Get Off McKagan produced the same year.

In addition to his musical career, McKagan has established himself as a writer. Since August 2008, he has written a weekly column for SeattleWeekly.com, from January to December 2009, he wrote a weekly financial column titled "Duffonomics" for Playboy.com, and since January 2011, he has written a weekly sports column for ESPN.com. McKagan's autobiography, It's So Easy (And Other Lies), was released on October 4, 2011. His second book, How to Be a Man: (and other illusions) was released on May 12, 2015. McKagan released a three-song EP with the same title to accompany the book, featuring Izzy Stradlin, Jerry Cantrell, Roy Mayorga and Taz Bentley.

In 2011, McKagan founded Meridian Rock, a wealth management firm for musicians. Headed by McKagan and British investor Andy Bottomley, the firm aims to educate musicians about their finances.

McKagan has been involved in The Heroes Project, founded by his friend Tim Medvetz, which is dedicated to helping soldiers and their families. As part of the project he took part in a climb up Mount Rainier in 2012, accompanying a former soldier with a prosthetic limb. During this climb, McKagan suffered a potentially fatal cerebral edema.

It was announced in 2012 that Rainstorm Entertainment will produce a "biographical documentary" based on It's So Easy (And Other Lies). McKagan is listed as a producer and writer. The film, titled It's So Easy (And Other Lies) after the book, was released in May 2016. Those interviewed for the project include Mick Jagger, Elton John, Slash, Joe Elliott and Arnold Schwarzenegger.

Following an appearance with the Hollywood Vampires at the 2016 Grammy Awards ceremony in tribute to Lemmy Kilmister, McKagan was considered a member of the supergroup, although his time in the band was short-lived as he returned to Guns N' Roses two months later.

== Personal life ==
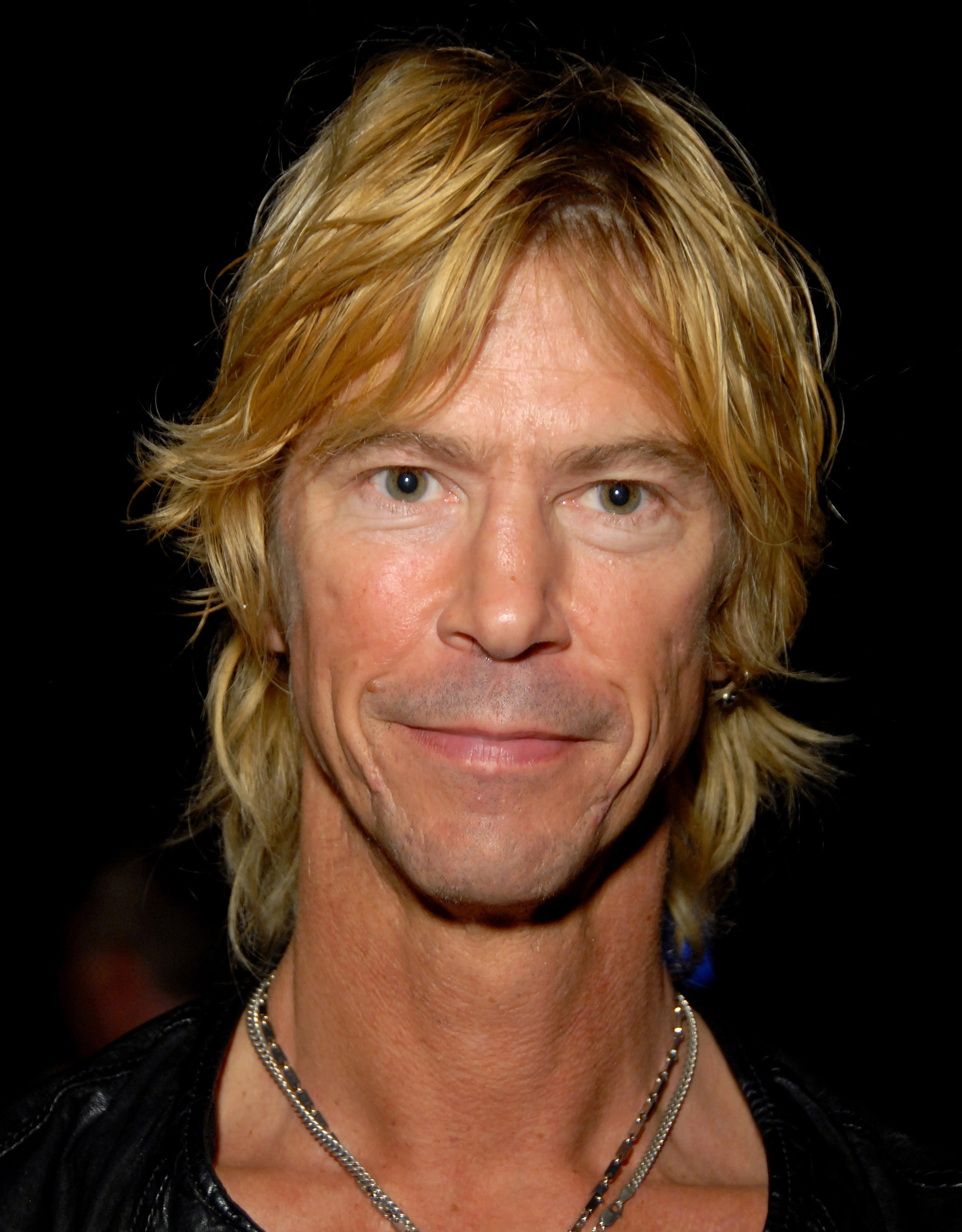
McKagan in March 2012

On May 28, 1988, McKagan married his first wife, Mandy Brixx; the couple divorced on April 1, 1990. In September 1992, he married Linda Johnson; this too ended in divorce in September 1995. On August 28, 1999, he married Susan Holmes, a fashion model and designer. They have two daughters. McKagan and his family reside in Seattle.

McKagan was one of the last people confirmed to have seen Nirvana frontman Kurt Cobain before he died on April 5, 1994. He sat next to Cobain on a flight from Los Angeles to Seattle on April 1. McKagan later recalled, "I didn't have any foresight that the guy was going to do what he did. I could tell he was bummed out, and I'd been that way before... I thought I'd ask him to come stay at my house; I turned around and he was gone."

On May 10, 1994, at the age of 30, McKagan became gravely ill due to acute alcohol-induced pancreatitis, which caused his pancreas to swell to the size of a football and leak digestive enzymes into his body. He was taken to Northwest Hospital and Medical Center in Seattle, where he was monitored until the swelling had shrunk. McKagan was later told by his doctors that he would be dead within a month if he did not stop drinking. He had made previous efforts to overcome his addiction, but this health crisis was his incentive to get sober for good. In his autobiography, he attributed his sobriety to exercise; first through mountain biking and later, martial arts.

McKagan has also claimed in his autobiography that the fictional product Duff Beer on The Simpsons was named after him, and has received no royalties, but Simpsons creator Matt Groening called the claim "absurd". Simpsons writer Mike Reiss similarly dismissed the claim in his memoir Springfield Confidential, stating that he'd "never heard of [McKagan]".

McKagan had dropped out of high school, but in 1994 enrolled in a basic finance course at Santa Monica Community College. He was motivated to enroll so he could understand the financial records from Guns N' Roses. He stated: "I couldn't make sense of [the financial paperwork]. I didn't know how much we had made or lost on the tour. As a 30-year-old millionaire, how do I admit to somebody that I don't know what the fuck I'm doing?"

In 2000, after attending several more classes at Seattle Central Community College, McKagan enrolled full-time at Seattle University's Albers School of Business and Economics. When Velvet Revolver took off in his final year as an undergraduate student, McKagan took a hiatus from business school to go on tour. As of 2011, he was still one quarter short of graduating.

== Books ==
- It's So Easy *And Other Lies* – Touchstone 2011, ISBN 978-1-4516-0663-8
- How to Be a Man (And Other Illusions) – 2015

== Discography ==
Solo albums

- Believe in Me (1993)
- Beautiful Disease (unreleased)
- Tenderness (2019)
- Lighthouse (2023)

=== with Guns N' Roses ===
- Appetite for Destruction (1987)
- G N' R Lies (1988)
- Use Your Illusion I (1991)
- Use Your Illusion II (1991)
- "The Spaghetti Incident?" (1993)
