= Izzy Stradlin =

American guitarist and songewriter (born 1962)

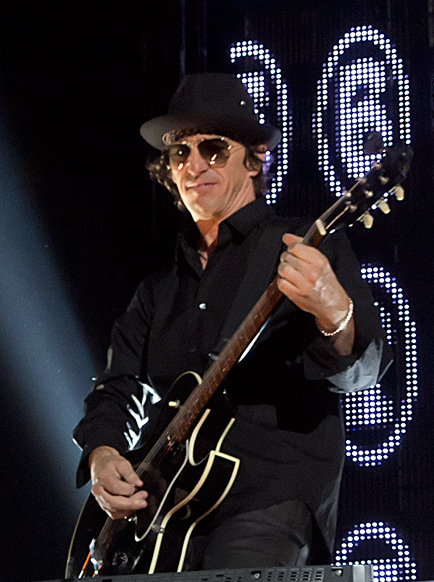
- Stradlin performing at a Guns N' Roses concert in 2012

Background information
- Born: Jeffrey Dean Isbell; April 8, 1962 (age 64); Lafayette, Indiana, U.S.
- Origin: Lafayette, Indiana, U.S.
- Genres: Hard rock; blues rock; punk rock; reggae; punk blues; heavy metal; ska punk; hardcore punk
- Occupation: Guitarist
- Instruments: Guitar; vocals
- Years active: 1979–2017
- Labels: Uzi Suicide; Geffen; Sanctuary; Victor; Cleopatra
- Formerly of: Guns N' Roses; Ju Ju Hounds; Hollywood Rose; Velvet Revolver; London; Naughty Women; The Babysitters; The Atoms; Voodoo Church; Shire

Jeffrey Dean Isbell (born April 8, 1962), known professionally as Izzy Stradlin, is an American guitarist, singer, and songwriter. He was a co-founder, rhythm guitarist, and backing vocalist of the hard rock band Guns N' Roses, with whom he recorded four studio albums and left at the height of their fame in 1991.

Following his departure from Guns N' Roses, Stradlin fronted his own rock band, Izzy Stradlin and the Ju Ju Hounds, before continuing to record as a solo artist. He was inducted into the Rock and Roll Hall of Fame as a member of Guns N' Roses in 2012.

== Life and career ==
=== Early life ===
Stradlin was born 1962 in Lafayette, Indiana. His father, Richard Clyde Isbell, was an engraver. His mother, Sonja LaVern Isbell (née Reagan), worked for a phone company. Stradlin has stated that he "grew up in Florida and moved with my mom to Lafayette." His parents divorced when Stradlin was eight. His mother moved Stradlin and his two younger brothers, Kevin Thomas Isbell and Joseph "Joe" Isbell to Lafayette, Indiana. Of his hometown, Stradlin said, "It was cool growing up there. There's a courthouse and a college, a river and railroad tracks. It's a small town, so there wasn't much to do. We rode bikes, smoked pot, got into trouble—it was pretty Beavis and Butt-Head actually." Izzy's grandfather's half-brother, Joseph William "Little Joe" Isbell, was born 1916. He was also a recording and touring artist, described as a "country yodeler".

Stradlin developed an interest in music early in life; by the age of eight, his musical favorites included Bob Dylan, Pink Floyd, Alice Cooper, and Led Zeppelin. His biggest musical influence was his paternal grandmother, who played drums in a swing jazz band with her friends. Inspired, Stradlin talked his parents into buying him a drum kit.

In high school, Stradlin started a band with his friends, one of whom was singer William Bailey, later known as Axl Rose. Stradlin recalled, "We were long-haired guys in high school. You were either a jock or a stoner. We weren't jocks, so we ended up hanging out together. We'd play covers in the garage. There were no clubs to play at, so we never made it out of the garage." Despite his aversion to school, Stradlin graduated in 1980 with a D average, the only original member of Guns N' Roses with a high school diploma. Set on a career in music, he subsequently moved to Los Angeles.

=== 1980–1984: Career beginnings ===
Shortly after his arrival in Los Angeles, Stradlin joined punk band Naughty Women. During his ill-fated first show with the band, audience members began attacking the musicians; Stradlin recalled, "I just grabbed a cymbal stand and stood on the side trying to fend them off, yelling, 'Get the fuck away from me, man!' That was my introduction to the rock scene in L.A." His two-month tenure in Naughty Women was followed by a stint in punk band The Atoms, before his drum kit was stolen from his car and he switched to bass. Stradlin then joined the heavy metal band Shire, during which he took up rhythm guitar to aid his songwriting.

In 1983, Stradlin formed Hollywood Rose with childhood friend Axl Rose, who had moved to Los Angeles the previous year. In January 1984, the band recorded a five-song demo featuring the tracks "Killing Time", "Anything Goes", "Rocker", "Shadow of Your Love", and "Reckless Life", which were released in 2004 as part of the compilation album The Roots of Guns N' Roses. The group disbanded in August, following which Stradlin briefly joined Sunset Strip staple London. He also formed the short-lived band Stalin with singer Eric Leach and guitarist Taz Rudd of Symbol Six. In December, he reunited with Hollywood Rose.

=== 1985–1991: Guns N' Roses ===
In March 1985, Stradlin founded Guns N' Roses with Axl Rose and members of L.A. Guns, Tracii Guns, Ole Beich and Rob Gardner, as a favor to L.A. Guns manager, Raz Cue, who had previously booked the act at the Troubadour. By June, the lineup consisted of Rose, guitarist Slash, rhythm guitarist Stradlin, bassist Duff McKagan, and drummer Steven Adler. They played nightclubs—such as the Whisky a Go Go, The Roxy, and The Troubadour—and opened for larger acts throughout 1985 and 1986. During this period, the band wrote much of its classic material, and Stradlin established himself as a key songwriter. In their early days, Stradlin worked as a pimp and drug dealer to help the band raise money, saying in a 1987 interview "[we] sold drugs, sold girls, sold… we just got it. We managed. In the beginning we’d throw parties and ransack a girl’s purse while one of the guys was with her.

Stradlin in 1987

In July 1987, Guns N' Roses released their debut album, Appetite for Destruction, which has sold over 28 million copies worldwide, including 18 million in the United States alone. Stradlin wrote or cowrote most of its songs, including the hits "Sweet Child o' Mine" and "Paradise City". He also wrote the hit "Patience" on the follow-up G N' R Lies, released in November 1988 to US sales of five million copies, despite containing only eight tracks, four of which were included on the previously released EP Live ?!*@ Like a Suicide.

As their success grew, so did tensions within the band. In 1989, opening for The Rolling Stones, Rose made an on-stage announcement in which he threatened to leave the band if Slash and Adler did not stop "dancing with Mr. Brownstone," a reference to their song of the same name about heroin. After being sentenced to a year's probation for urinating in public aboard an airplane (after which the band nicknamed him "Whizzy"), Stradlin decided to attain sobriety; he returned to his house in Indiana, where he detoxed from drugs and alcohol.

In September 1991, Guns N' Roses released the long-awaited Use Your Illusion I and Use Your Illusion II, which debuted at No. 2 and No. 1 respectively in the US chart – an unprecedented feat. Stradlin co-wrote the hits "Don't Cry" and "You Could Be Mine", and performed lead vocals on "Dust N' Bones", "You Ain't the First", "Double Talkin' Jive", and "14 Years". As with their previous records, his preferred guitar during recording was a Gibson ES-175.

By the release of the Use Your Illusion albums, Stradlin had become dissatisfied with life in Guns N' Roses: "Once I quit drugs, I couldn't help looking around and asking myself, 'Is this all there is?' I was just tired of it; I needed to get out." Stradlin did not take part in the mid-September 1991 video shoot for "Don't Cry", fueling rumors he would leave. Stradlin abruptly quit the band on November 7, 1991, after a near-repeat of the Riverport Riot occurred during a show in Germany.

Stradlin later said, "I didn't like the complications that became such a part of daily life in Guns N' Roses," citing Rose's behavior and mismanagement of the band on the Use Your Illusion Tour as examples. He also cited the difficulties of being sober around other bandmates while they continued to use drugs and alcohol. Stradlin claimed he was offered a new contract right before he quit the band, demoting him: "They were gonna cut my percentage of royalties down. I was like, 'Fuck you! I've been there from Day One. Why should I do that? Fuck you, I'll go play the Whisky.' That's what happened. It was utterly insane."

Some of Stradlin's guitar playing recorded during the Illusion sessions appears on Guns N' Roses' 1993 covers album "The Spaghetti Incident?", although he was uncredited on the project.

=== 1992–1994: Ju Ju Hounds ===
Following his departure from Guns N' Roses, Stradlin returned to his hometown of Lafayette, Indiana, where he began working on new material. He formed the band Izzy Stradlin and the Ju Ju Hounds, which consisted of Stradlin on vocals and rhythm guitar, Rick Richards of Georgia Satellites on lead guitar, Jimmy Ashhurst of Broken Homes on bass, and Charlie Quintana on drums. Their self-titled debut album was released in October 1992 to positive reviews; Rolling Stone called it "a ragged, blues-drenched, and thoroughly winning solo debut." Ju Ju Hounds played its first show in September at The Avalon in Chicago, before embarking on a tour of Europe, Australia, and North America.

In May 1993, Stradlin reunited with Guns N' Roses for five shows in Europe and the Middle East to fill in for his replacement, Gilby Clarke, who had broken his wrist in a motorcycle accident. After Stradlin returned to the Ju Ju Hounds, Axl Rose dedicated the Stradlin-penned "Double Talkin' Jive" to him during several shows. In September, the Ju Ju Hounds undertook a tour of Japan, where the band played its final show at the Shibuya Public Hall in Tokyo. Stradlin then took time off from music unannounced, leaving the Ju Ju Hounds and going to the Bahamas, traveling extensively and dedicating much of his time to his other passions—motor racing, skateboarding and even building a motor track close to his Indiana home.

=== 1995–2002: Solo career and Velvet Revolver ===
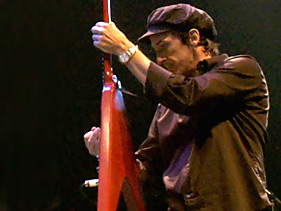
Stradlin during a concert in 2006

In 1995, Stradlin began recording material for his first solo album, 117°. Released in March 1998, the album was recorded over a period of two years and featured his former bandmates Duff McKagan and Rick Richards, as well as former Reverend Horton Heat drummer Taz Bentley, whose work Stradlin admired. As before, Stradlin had little interest in promoting his music; he did few interviews and played no live performances. The album turned out to be his last release on his long-time label Geffen; as a result of the merger of Geffen and Interscope, Stradlin was dropped from the label's roster.

In December 1999, Stradlin's next solo album, Ride On, was released on the Universal Victor label in Japan. It featured the same lineup as his previous release. To promote the album, Stradlin—with McKagan, Richards, and Bentley—played four shows in Japan the following April. With the addition of keyboardist Ian McLagan, the group recorded two more albums: River, which was released in May 2001 on Sanctuary, and a second Japan-only release, On Down the Road, which followed in August 2002 on JVC Victor.

Stradlin was then asked by his former Guns N' Roses bandmates Duff McKagan, Slash, and Matt Sorum to join the supergroup Velvet Revolver. Although he contributed to the songwriting process while the band was in its formative stage, Stradlin ultimately declined to join due to his aversion to life on the road and his unwillingness to work with a lead singer, although he offered to share vocal duties with McKagan.

=== 2003–2010: Independent solo career ===
In 2003, Stradlin recorded his sixth album, Like a Dog, with guitarist Rick Richards, drummer Taz Bentley, and bassist JT Longoria. It was originally scheduled for a late 2003 release, with just under one thousand promo copies made. However, the album was not released until October 2005, when Stradlin—prompted by a fan petition—made it available through internet order. The following year, Stradlin re-released Ride On, River, On Down the Road, and Like a Dog through iTunes.

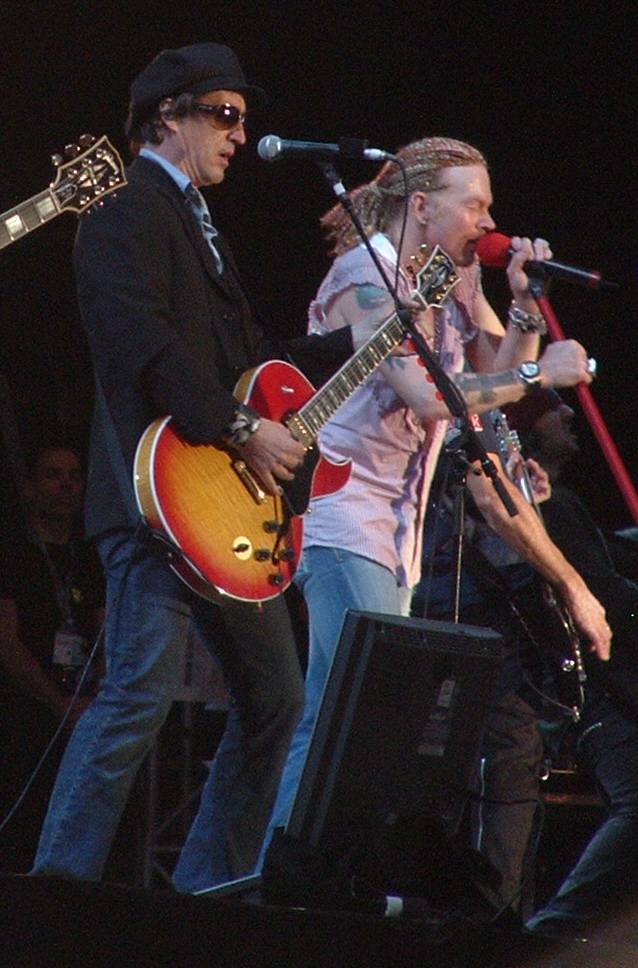
Stradlin and Axl Rose at the Download Festival in 2006

In May 2006, thirteen years after his last performance with Guns N' Roses, Stradlin made a guest appearance at the band's show at the Hammerstein Ballroom in New York; he played on "Patience", "Think About You", and "Nightrain". He then performed with Guns N' Roses for 13 shows during the band's summer European tour. Stradlin said, "Axl [Rose] and I connected via cell phone this year, I stopped by. It was nice to reconnect with an old friend/war buddy/fellow musician. I told him later I'd like to join the fun in some way and he said I was welcome to come and play something, so I did! Took me about three weeks to recover from the six weeks of touring!" In December, he played three shows with the group at the Gibson Amphitheatre in Universal City, California.

Stradlin released his seventh album, Miami, through iTunes in May 2007. It again featured Rick Richards, Taz Bentley, and JT Longoria, as well as keyboardist Joey Huffman. Guitarist Richards described the album as being "a bit of a departure from Like a Dog but still quite a rocker." In July, a remixed version of Miami was released through iTunes; Stradlin called the new mix "much louder and more powerful sounding." In November of that year, he released a second iTunes-only album, Fire, the Acoustic Album, which also featured Richards, Bentley, and Longoria.

Stradlin's next iTunes release, Concrete, came out in July 2008. In addition to his regular collaborators, Stradlin also invited Duff McKagan to play bass on three songs, including the title track. Stradlin then released two more albums through iTunes: Smoke, which came out in December 2009, and Wave of Heat, which followed in July 2010 and again featured McKagan, who appears on seven tracks. Also in 2010, Stradlin appeared as a guest on Slash's first solo album, Slash; he performs rhythm guitar on the first track, "Ghost".

=== 2011–present: Rock and Roll Hall of Fame Induction and single releases ===
In April 2012, Stradlin was inducted into the Rock and Roll Hall of Fame as a member of the classic lineup of Guns N' Roses. In a statement released through Duff McKagan's blog for Seattle Weekly, he thanked the Rock and Roll Hall of Fame "for the acknowledgement of our works over the years," his former bandmates, and his fans for their continuing support. Known to avoid public attention, Stradlin did not attend the induction ceremony.

In the month following the induction, Stradlin joined Guns N' Roses on stage during two shows at London's O2 Arena, where they performed a range of songs including "14 Years," which had not been performed live since his departure in 1991. He also performed with Guns N' Roses in July, at a private show in Saint-Tropez and a concert in Palma de Mallorca, and again in November, during the last two shows of the band's twelve-date "Appetite for Democracy" residency in Las Vegas. Also in November, Stradlin released the iTunes-only single "Baby-Rann"—his first release in over two years; an accompanying video was made available via YouTube.

Amidst rumors and speculation, Stradlin joined Twitter, and confirmed in a statement to Rolling Stone that he would not be involved with the 'reunited' Guns N' Roses lineup in 2016. He later stated that he declined because the band "didn't want to split the loot equally". In 2018, journalist Alan Niven reported that Stradlin participated in a soundcheck with Guns N' Roses sometime in 2017, but ultimately left before guesting at the show.

Stradlin released numerous singles in 2016, previewing samples of the songs via his Twitter account and through the YouTube channel 'classicrockstuffs'. "Sunshine" by Jonathon Edwards and "Stuck in the Middle with You" by Stealers Wheel were acoustic videos made available through YouTube, whilst "Walk N' Song", "F.P. Money" (featuring former Guns N' Roses drummer Matt Sorum), "To Being Alive" and a cover version of the J. J. Cale song "Call Me the Breeze" featuring Jesse Aycock and Lauren Barth, were released to online music stores.

In 2017, Stradlin played guitar on the song "Grandview" by John Mellencamp, on his album Sad Clowns & Hillbillies. Martina McBride was also featured on the song.

== Personal life ==
Isbell was married to Swedish model Annica Kreuter until they divorced in 2001. As of 2016, Stradlin was living in or around Ojai, California.

== Equipment ==
Guitars:

- ESP Eclipse Custom
- Gibson ES-175
- Gibson Byrdland
- Gibson ES-135
- Gibson Les Paul Custom
- Fender Telecaster
- Gibson ES-355
- Gibson Les Paul Special Double Cutaway

Amps:

- Mesa Boogie Mark Series Mark I and Mark IIB Coliseum
- Fender Bassman heads with a Mesa Boogie 4×12 cabinet
- Marshall JCM-800

== Discography ==
=== Solo albums ===
- 117° (1998)
- Ride On (1999)
- River (2001)
- On Down the Road (2002)
- Like a Dog (2005)
- Miami (2007)
- Fire, the Acoustic Album (2007)
- Concrete (2008)
- Smoke (2009)
- Wave of Heat (2010)

=== with Guns N' Roses ===
- Appetite for Destruction (1987)
- G N' R Lies (1988)
- Use Your Illusion I (1991)
- Use Your Illusion II (1991)
- "The Spaghetti Incident?" (1993) (uncredited)

=== with The Ju Ju Hounds ===
- Pressure Drop EP (1992)
- Izzy Stradlin and the Ju Ju Hounds (1992)
- Izzy Stradlin and the Ju Ju Hounds Live EP (1993)
