= The Lemons =

American rock band

- Origin: Seattle, Washington, U.S.
- Genres: Post-grunge, punk, pop punk, thrash metal
- Years active: 1991–1996
- Labels: Macola, Will, Mercury
- Past members: Jimmy Paulson; Greg Lovell; Brent Saunders; Jeff Ramirez; Rob Cunningham; Nabil Ayers; Jeff Hiatt

The Lemons was an American rock band from Seattle, Washington, formed in 1991. The first lineup of the group consisted of Jimmy Paulson (lead vocals, guitar), Greg Lovell (guitar), Brent Saunders (bass) and Jeff Ramirez (drums). Ramirez was soon replaced by Rob Cunningham and the band released their debut album entitled Marvel in 1993.

After signing with Mercury Records, The Lemons released a self-titled EP in 1994. The same year, Cunningham was replaced by Nabil Ayers, while Paulson departed the band in 1995 and was replaced by Jeff Hiatt, with Lovell taking up lead vocals. They released their second and final album entitled Sturdy in 1995, before disbanding the following year.

== History ==
=== Formation and Marvel (1991–1993) ===
When Greg Lovell, originally from Florida, moved to Washington from California, met Jimmy Paulson, they decided to form a band, adding bassist Brent Saunders and drummer Jeff Ramirez to the lineup in 1991, with Paulson on lead vocals and sharing guitar duties with Lovell. They played local shows, opening for acts such as the Supersuckers and the Dwarves, before parting ways with Ramirez. They soon successfully auditioned drummer Rob Cunningham, after he put an ad in The Rocket, and began recording their debut album three weeks later. They continued to play live, including shows opening for Meddaphysical and Bathtub Gin, before signing a deal with independent record label Macola Records in 1993. Released in the same year and produced by Al Sieg, Marvel was described as "a speedy album that owed more to the bratty '80 pop-punk of the Descendents and All than the currently fashionable sludgy grunge sound" by Allmusic review Stewart Mason, though he criticized Seig's production.

=== Major-label deal, Sturdy and breakup (1994–1996) ===
The Lemons signed a deal with Will Records before signing with Mercury Records in 1994, releasing a self-titled EP the same year. They recorded their new album with Bill Stevenson, of the Descendents. producing. However, the label rejected the album, with Cunningham departing the band, joining Flake, and guitarist Nabil Ayers joining as their new drummer, making his first appearance with the band when they opened for Mudhoney later in the year. They decided to re-record their second album with Ayers, however Paulson departed the band, temporarily joining Best Kissers in the World before forming New American Shame, with Johnny Reidt, in 1998. Adding guitarist Jeff Hiatt to the group, Lovell became the group's lead singer and re-recorded their second album. Released in 1995, Sturdy sold poorly resulting in the band being dropped from the label a month later. The following year, The Lemons disbanded.

=== Post-breakup activities and one-off reunion (1996–present) ===
Ayers went on to join Alien Crime Syndicate forming the record labels Collective Fruit and The Control Group to release the albums Dust to Dirt, XL from Coast to Coast and Ten Songs in the Key of Betrayal with the band. He later joined John Roderick's The Long Winters, touring with Keane and releasing the album Putting the Days to Bed. His music store, Sonic Boom, was also named the top independent music store in the US by Rolling Stone magazine in 2006.

In April 2011, The Lemons reunited for a one-off show at Neumos in Seattle, opening for Duff McKagan's Loaded.

== Musical style and influences ==
The Lemons have seen their music compared to the Ramones, Descendents, All and the New York Dolls while the band cite influences from bands such as The Beatles, Cheap Trick, The Plimsouls and Kiss. Their music has been described as "thrash happy" and that "because they don't stay put neatly in a metal, punk or grunge category, they're able to play for different audiences and with different bands." Reviewing Marvel for Allmusic, Steward Mason stated that the album "has a refreshingly post-grunge sound" and that "the clever "Circle K Girl" and the New York Dolls-like glitter thrash of "All I Got" and "Keep Diggin'" are pure punk-pop gems."

== Band members ==
Former members

- Jimmy Paulson – lead vocals, lead guitar (1991–1995)
- Greg Lovell – lead vocals, guitar, backing vocals (1991–1996)
- Brent Saunders – bass (1991–1996)
- Jeff Ramirez – drums (1991)
- Rob Cunningham – drums (1991–1994)
- Nabil Ayers – drums (1994–1996)
- Jeff Hiatt – lead guitar (1995–1996)

== Discography ==
Studio albums

- Marvel (1993)
- Sturdy (1995)

EPs

- The Lemons (1994)
