= Fantastic Wounds =

Studio album by Schoolyard Heroes
- Released: June 21, 2005
- Length: 38:27
- Label: Control Group/TCG
- Producers: Joe Reineke, T. Dallas Reed

Schoolyard Heroes chronology
The Funeral Sciences (2003)	Fantastic Wounds (2005)	Abominations (2007)

Singles from Fantastic Wounds
- 1. "They Live" Released: August 8, 2012

Fantastic Wounds is the second studio album by American horror punk band Schoolyard Heroes. Like the band's first album The Funeral Sciences, it was released through the label The Control Group. Following the band's first release, they had generated success with the underground Seattle rock scene and had secured a small cult following, largely due to the reputation they had built from their concert tour with Vendetta Red.

All four members of the band recorded the album while living at the same University District together. The production of the album was handled by Joe Reineke and T. Dallas Reed, with the majority of the lyrics composed by the band's singer and frontman Ryann Donnelly. Donnelly serves as the main singer on the album, with bassist Jonah Bergman performing backing vocals. Taking influence from horror films, lyrically the album features macabre subject matter and social commentary. The band expressed the desire to become more diverse with their musical approach than on their debut album, citing a larger list of influences. The album presents some of its themes in a theatrical, over-the-top and often campy style.

It was promoted by the single "They Live", which received a music video. The album received positive reviews from music critics, who praised Donnelly's singing, the progression that the band had showcased from their prior work, and the humorous way that the morbid themes were expressed on the project. While a critical success, the album failed to achieve any chart positions. The success of the album lead to the release of their final album Abominations released in 2007.

== Background ==
The debut album by Schoolyard Heroes, The Funeral Sciences was an underground success, selling over 5000 copies. Following the release of their album, the band promoted themselves with a concert tour with Seattle-based band Vendetta Red. While on tour the band simultaneously worked on their second album. The band quickly developed a reputation for their eccentric, often shocking live performances, and began to develop a cult following. They were noted for their prolific nature and their frequent live performances and touring.

For their sophomore release, the band chose to stay with their record label The Control Group, founded by Nabil Ayers. Ayers stated that touring with Vendetta Red was the best thing that could have happened to the band, comparing it to touring with the band Green Day. He expressed that touring with a band with a similar style and an already established fanbase would influence the band members positively.

== Writing and recording ==
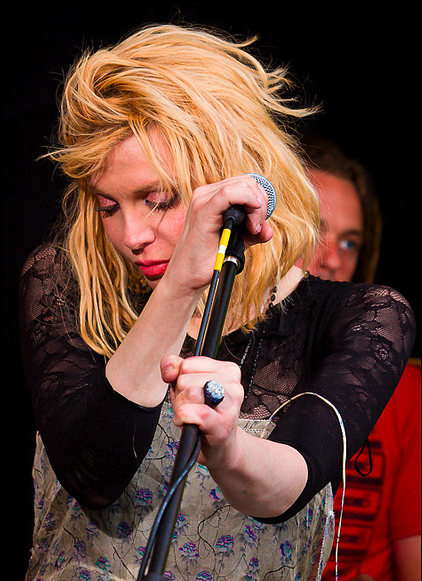
Singer Courtney Love served as an inspiration to vocalist Donnelly.

All four members of Schoolyard Heroes lived together at the Seattle University District during the recording of Fantastic Wounds. Vocalist Ryan Donnelly noted that during the production of the album the band didn't do drugs or drink alcohol, and instead spent their time playing video games and eating fast food. Between recording sessions, the band spent their loose time watching episodes of classic horror series like The Twilight Zone and The Outer Limits.

The album's style progresses from the one found in The Funeral Sciences; the more pop heavy aesthetic exhibited on that album was replaced with themes found within heavy metal music, and was more forceful and "merciless" in nature. Conceptual themes found within their first project are maintained on Fantastic Wounds, including lyrics inspired by science fiction and horror films. Like all of the band's projects, the album takes several of its themes from b-movies and horror films. Horror films had always been a substantial influence on the band; bassist Jonah Bergman's father had taken him to double features as a kid. According to Bergman, the band had grown quite a lot from their first album and had learned more about producing and recording music. Bergman, when describing the album, mused, "honestly, these are 10 of the most fucking killer songs I've ever heard in my life," stating that the album perfectly embodied the type of music the band wished to produce.

According to Donnelly, the band had been working together for five years, stating that if she didn't have the band, she wouldn't know what else to do with her life. She described the band as a work of passion, citing sources of influences such as the bands Misfits, Blondie and Iron Maiden, and singer Courtney Love. The Misfits in particular were a large influence to the album; their horror themed and often purposely over-the-top style to making music were important in shaping the way the band presented themselves in image. Donelly expressed an interest with progressing the style of music on their sophomoric effort, stating that she wanted to have a tighter focus this time around, and specifically noting that the song titles on Fantastic Wounds were more direct and confident in nature. Speaking about the creation of the project, she mused:

"I am so very happy with this record—both with the performances and the production. Blood, sweat and tears went into its making. It was the longest we'd spent on anything ever we've done. We knew how we wanted it to sound and we wanted to get it perfect, so yeah, we spent a long time on it. And I tell you; we had to make a lot of tough choices, with the sequencing. We wanted it to be perfect, we wanted all the different energies to flow into each other just so."

While the album was influenced by things such as macabre horror tales, zombies, and monsters, Donelly assured that the album was "always about something much more real", musing that "there's so much genuine evil in the world. That said, I love that people take all kinds of different things away from our songs, and invest so much of themselves in their interpretations." To prevent the album from being to depressing, the band attempted to present the album with the aesthetic of a b-movie, with a comical, overly theatrical tone. Donelly also noted the desire to become more diverse musically with the second album, as the band had begun to listen to more sources of music.

Bergman cited his desire to one day perform in Graceland as another influence on the project, musing that if the band became popular enough he would one day be able to perform there. Bergman commented "I used to sit in my bedroom and think, 'Damn, if we could just play Graceland, I would die a happy guy'". Before the album was released, it was promoted by the release of a music video for the single "They Live".

== Content ==
"Nightmare at 20,000 Feet"
Segment of the atmospheric "Nightmare at 20,000 Feet" with Donnelly singing over the math-rock influenced guitar riff.

"They Live"
Intro of single "They Live" with Donnelly singing over the muted guitar riffing.

Album opener "Body Shots" serves as an introduction to the style of the album. The song is barely one minute in length, compared to the duration of the majority of the songs on the album which are around four minutes long. The song contains singing by Donnelly that is largely scream-based, with guitar riffing taking influence from thrash metal. The track showcases guitarist Steve Bonnell's math rock-driven and largely melodic riffs that dominate the opening song. "Body Shots" has been described as a trailer for the rest of the album; the overall tone and energy of the song has been cited as a teaser for the rest of the album.

The next song, "Panic in the Year Zero", boasts a chorus that invokes the Iron Maiden song "Run to the Hills". The song has been called epic in nature, with guitar playing influenced by the playing of Omar Rodríguez-López. Donnelly's vocal performance has been compared to that of Bruce Dickinson on the song. The song waltzes over topics like the apocalypse and features Donnelly singing "say your prayers" in a multitude of ways. Steven Bishop of Hybrid Magazine views that "Year Zero" showcases some of the lighter themes of the album, summarizing:

"Believe me, there is nothing like a female singer who can step up and belt out the lines, yet has enough Sauvé Fair to finesse the lighter side of the material, and "Panic In The Year Zero" is a perfect example of that. If the vocals are the constancy, the guitar is the meat and potatoes, delivering resounding lines that drive the material and vary the intensity nicely; one moment giving meaningful power chords, the next moving with an asynchronous line. The bass uses space appropriately, developing astute lines that emphasize relationships to the drums here and the guitar there, always keeping it interesting."

"Serial Killers Know How to Party" is tongue-in-cheek and somewhat comical in nature, heavily influences by horror films. Donnelly shouts "your screams could raise the dead" over a fast-paced guitar riff. "Centaur: Half-Man Half-Motorcycle" is reinforced with a double-bass panel, a technique that allows the drumming to sound more clear. Both "Centaur: Half-Man Half-Motorcycle" and "Battlestar Anorexia" channel some of the thematic similarities as the act Betty Blowtorch. On "They Live", Donelly boasts the line "come with me, you pretty thing, and we'll celebrate with amputations." The song is named from the John Carpenter film, They Live. "Nightmare at 20,000 Feet" features a foreboding atmosphere, fueled by a progressive math-rock style of production, with some disco influences as well.

"Funeral Parlor Tricks" features widely different styles of production during its running time. "Nothing Cleanses Quite Like a Fire" and album closer "The Girl Who Was Born Without a Face" relay themes of pulp violence.

== Reception ==
Professional ratings
Review scores
Source	Rating
Three Imaginary Girls	6.9 stars on a 10 point scale
Exclaim!	(favorable)
TrebleZine	(favorable)
PopMatters	(favorable)
Seattle Weekly	(favorable)
Hybrid Magazine	(favorable)
Decoy Music	3/5 stars
Spin	(favorable)

Exclaim! critic Sam Sutherland felt that the band had successfully progressed from their debut album, musing "more polished than their debut, this record possesses all the angular riffs and math-rock breakdowns of their previous work, but is greatly aided by a sense of cohesion between their colliding influences and disparate style of songwriting", describing the album "as fantastic as its title suggests." Ernest Simpson of TrebleZine called Donnelly the Seattle-based Karen O, and wrote that "don't be surprised if Schoolyard Heroes leap to a major or at least a larger indie label after the success of Fantastic Wounds." Roger Holland of PopMatters viewed that the band had begun as a juvenile pop-punk with only a few unique ideas, calling Fantastic Wounds a "thing of pure kinetic beauty". According to Holland, the album was "polished, perfected and just generally worked up into something quiet shiny and special. On the debut, the influences were everywhere, suffocating the spark. But the new songs, with names like "Panic in the Year Zero", "Nightmare At 20,000 Feet" and "The Girl Who Was Born Without a Face" are confident, complex and strong enough to give this young band its own fierce identity."

Seattle Weekly critic Michaelangelo Matos viewed that while Donnelly was the standout of the album, stating that the band was "neither a rock Diamanda nor a mere hood ornament; Schoolyard Heroes' ghastly gestalt feeds on at least four entities", and that the album was launched by a triplet-driven solo performance by Jonah Bergman. Decoy's music Brandon Carter compared the band favorably to a train wreck, commenting that the band could be viewed "in the same fashion as a train wreck you just can't bring yourself to look away, for fear that you might miss something", continuing that "however, what you'd miss if you turned away from this band is a fearsome onslaught of shrieks, screams, and raw energy." Steven Bishop of Hybrid Magazine reported that style-wise the band was not for everyone, commenting that "but for those select few who appreciate the movement and atmosphere created here, they will find a technically judicious band that leads with good hooks and follows through with great substance to create an album that is wholly worth it, back to front."

Jessica Grose of Spin viewed that Donnelly seems "to be lobbying for goth poster girl of the new millennium", stating that the album successfully bordered on both metal and punk influences. Three Imaginary Girls mused that Fantastic Wounds maintained the "acrobatic inter-instrumental dynamics and savagely clever, at times genuinely affecting modern-life-as-horror-movie lyrics that defined their awesome debut, The Funeral Sciences", and noted that it "lacks a bit in the insouciant exuberance displayed by its predecessor." The same website later listed the album amongst their 100 best albums of the year at number 18. While not charting on any music charts, the album was a commercial success, selling 1500 copies in its first week of release.

== Track listing ==
No.	Title	Length
1.	"Body Shots"	1:02
2.	"Panic in the Year Zero"	4:08
3.	"Serial Killers Know How to Party"	3:29
4.	"Centaur: Half-Man Half-Motorcycle"	4:22
5.	"They Live"	3:46
6.	"Battlestar Anorexia"	3:36
7.	"Nightmare at 20,000 Feet"	4:28
8.	"Funeral Parlor Tricks"	3:55
9.	"Nothing Cleanses Quite Like Fire"	5:42
10.	"The Girl Who was Born Without a Face"	3:49

== Personnel ==
Information taken from Fantastic Wounds liner notes.

- Jonah Bergman – bass, Vocals, primary artist
- Steve Bonnell – guitar, primary artist
- Ryann Donnelly – vocals, primary artist
- Nouela Oake Johnston – fender rhodes, keyboards
- Jeff Kleinsmith – artwork
- T. Dallas Reed – engineer, mixing, producer
- Joe Reineke – producer
- Brian Turner – drums, primary artist
