= Alien Crime Syndicate =

American rock band

- Origin: San Francisco, California, U.S.
- Genres: Hard rock, alternative rock, indie rock, pop punk, power pop, space rock
- Years active: 1997–2005
- Labels: Revolution, Collective Fruit, Will, V2, The Control Group, Toshiba EMI
- Past members: Sean Trudeau (1997-1999); Joe Reineke (1997-2005); Jeff Rouse (1997-2005); Nabil Ayers (1999-2005); Jason Krevey (1999-2001); Mike Squires (2002-2003); Mike Davis (2004)

Alien Crime Syndicate, often abbreviated to ACS, were a rock band formed in San Francisco, California, in 1997. From 1999 to the band's breakup in 2005, the lineup consisted primarily of Joe Reineke (vocals, guitar), Jeff Rouse (bass, backing vocals), Nabil Ayers (drums), while guitarists Jason Krevey, Mike Squires and Mike Davis were also members of the band.

Following the breakup of previous band The Meices, Joe Reineke formed Alien Crime Syndicate with Jeff Rouse in San Francisco, before they relocated to Los Angeles following a deal with Revolution Records. After recording their debut album, the label folded, with the band relocating to Seattle, adding Nabil Ayers, formerly of The Lemons, and Jason Krevey to the lineup. They released one EP in 1999 before releasing their debut album titled Dust to Dirt in 2001. Will Records then acquired the Revolution recorded album, titled From the Word Go, issuing it the same year.

By 2001, Jason Krevey departed the band and was replaced by former Nevada Bachelors guitarist Mike Squires. XL from Coast to Coast was released the following year, through Ayer's The Control Group label, with the album's first single "Ozzy" becoming a minor hit on local radio. The album was re-released, following a deal with V2 Records, while an EP titled Break the Record was released in 2003.

The band released their fourth and final album, titled Ten Songs in the Key of Betrayal, in 2004 through The Control Group, after leaving V2, with Mike Davis joining the band in place of Squires. A tour supporting Tommy Stinson followed, while they also performed as his backing band. However, by 2005, Alien Crime Syndicate disbanded with the members going on to various projects.

== History ==
=== Formation (1997–1999) ===
Joe Reineke was previously a member of The Meices. After releasing four studio albums, The Meices disbanded in 1997, with Reineke forming Alien Crime Syndicate with bassist Jeff Rouse in San Francisco, California the same year. By the summer, they relocated to Los Angeles and were signed to Revolution Records. The band, with Shawn Trudeau, recorded their debut album with producer Gil Norton at Grandmaster Studios in Hollywood. However, by 1998, Alien Crime Syndicate were dropped from the label following the folding of Revolution Records.

The band relocated to Seattle, Washington adding drummer Nabil Ayers, formerly of The Lemons, and guitarist Jason Krevey to the lineup before performing live shows locally. Originally intended to be a 7", the band released a five-song EP titled Supernatural in 1999 through Ayer's Collective Fruit label. Supernatural was well received, earning comparisons to U2 while Mike DaRonco of Allmusic stated that the EP was "in a league of its own." The band continued to play locally, including a show with The Western State Hurricanes while they also toured California.

=== Dust to Dirt and From the Word Go (1999–2001) ===
Alien Crime Syndicate recorded their new album, titled Dust to Dirt, at Orbit Audio and Jupiter Studios in Seattle. Produced by Reineke, the album featured new material, as well as re-recorded songs from their unreleased album, and it was released by the Collective Fruit label on February 8, 2000. The band toured in support and with their music receiving decent radio play. When the rights to their unreleased album, titled From the Word Go, were acquired by Will Records, Collective Fruit stopped pressing the Dust to Dirt CD so the band could tour in support of the Will album, which was released on July 18 the same year.

Reviewing From the Word Go, Stewart Mason of Allmusic said that "Joe Reineke's brand of lightly psychedelicized, guitar-heavy power pop rockers is more appropriate for the kind of pop/rock obsessives who will appreciate the jangly strums, vintage synth sounds, and appealingly retro-feeling fondness for singalong choruses repeated once or twice too often." He also stated that "[t]hose who like Carl Newman's pre-New Pornographers band Zumpano might consider Alien Crime Syndicate a kindred spirit with an outer space preoccupation replacing Zumpano's '60s fixation." The band continued to play live shows in the Northwest in support of the album. The same year, Rouse joined Loaded, at the invitation of drummer Geoff Reading, replacing previous bassist Dave Dederer for the band's tour of the US and Japan in support of Dark Days.

=== XL from Coast to Coast (2001–2003) ===
Ozzy
A sample of "Ozzy" from XL from Coast to Coast. The first single from XL from Coast to Coast, "Ozzy" became a minor hit on local radio while it was also one of the top-selling records at local independent record stores.

The band spent a year writing and recording their third album. However, Krevey departed and was replaced by Rouse's Loaded bandmate and former Nevada Bachelors guitarist Mike Squires. The album was recorded at Orbit Audio Studios in Seattle and was produced by Reineke. To release the album, titled XL from Coast to Coast, Ayers founded The Control Group record label with the album released in January 2002. It received some positive reviews, with critics noting Urge Overkill and The Replacements influences. The first single "Ozzy" received regular radio play on Seattle's KNDD, becoming a minor hit, while the single and album were both listed in the top-selling records at local independent record stores in Seattle Weekly.

The band subsequently signed a deal with V2 Records, who re-released the album three months after its initial release. The European and Japanese, released through Toshiba EMI, editions of the album included a cover of Elton John's "Don't Go Breaking My Heart" which featured Duff McKagan, formerly of Guns N' Roses, and Kim Warnick, of Visqueen and formerly of the Fastbacks. The cover was also included on the Break the Record EP released in 2003. The band toured in support, playing at the Fremont Fair while they also supported Sugar Ray on their tour of Six Flags amusement parks.

=== Ten Songs in the Key of Betrayal and Tommy Stinson (2003–2005) ===
"When I started ACS, I wanted to start a band different than my old band (The Meices). And I tried all sorts of stuff - loops, etc. But the more we did it, the more I felt I should go back and do what I'm best at. We didn't set out to make anything specific, but we wanted to make a better record than we did before."

—Joe Reineke on the recording of Ten Songs in the Key of Betrayal.

Despite the label picking up the option for their next album, Alien Crime Syndicate left V2 Records and returned to The Control Group. The band entered pre-production with producer Gil Norton who helped with arrangements and songs. The album was recorded at Orbit Audio and was produced by Reineke, with Norton serving as executive producer. Squires left the band prior to the recording of the album and was replaced by Mike Davis, who recorded additional guitars on three songs. Ten Songs in the Key of Betrayal was released on April 20, 2004 to positive reviews, with John D. Luerssen of Allmusic stating that the album was "a kickass rock & roll record" and that "when they hit their marks [...] ACS is as immediate as it is fun."

Alien Crime Syndicate toured the West Coast in support of the album, before touring with Guns N' Roses, former The Replacements bassist Tommy Stinson, in support of his solo album Village Gorilla Head, both as the supporting act and Stinson's backing band, replacing The Figgs. They toured both the US and Europe with Stinson, while they also recorded the live shows for a possible DVD. By 2005, Alien Crime Syndicate disbanded.

=== Post-breakup activities (2005–present) ===
Rouse joined Vendetta Red, before forming Sirens Sister with Vendetta Red members Zach Davidson and Leif Anderson as well as Ben Libay following the breakup of the band. They released one album titled Echoes from the Ocean Floor, in 2006, before Rouse left the group. He also reunited with Loaded, along with Mike Squires, in 2006, going on to release an EP, Wasted Heart, in 2008 and album, Sick, in 2009 while they also completed the recording of their third, The Taking, in 2010. He also formed a solo project titled To the Glorious Lonely.

Ayers joined John Roderick's The Long Winters, touring with Keane and releasing the album Putting the Days to Bed. His music store, Sonic Boom, was also named the top independent music store in the US by Rolling Stone magazine in 2006.

== Musical style ==
Alien Crime Syndicate's music have often been described as a space rock, power pop, hard rock, indie rock, pop rock and pop punk. The band has also seen their music compared to U2, Zumpano, Urge Overkill, The Replacements, Weezer and Fountains of Wayne.

== Band members ==
- Joe Reineke – vocals, guitar (1997–2005)
- Jeff Rouse – bass, backing vocals (1997–2005)
- Nabil Ayers – drums (1999–2005)
- Sean Trudeau - drums (1997-1999)
- Jason Krevey – guitar, backing vocals (1999–2001)
- Mike Squires – guitar, backing vocals (2002–2003)
- Mike Davis – guitar (2004)

== Discography ==
Studio Albums

- Dust to Dirt (2000)
- From the Word Go (2000)
- XL from Coast to Coast (2002)
- Ten Songs in the Key of Betrayal (2004)

EPs

- Supernatural (1999)
- Break the Record (2003)
