= Abominations (album) =

Studio album by Schoolyard Heroes
- Released: September 18, 2007
- Recorded: January 16–February 3, 2007
- Length: 45:31
- Label: Island Def Jam
- Producer: John Goodmanson

Schoolyard Heroes chronology
Fantastic Wounds (2005)	Abominations (2007)

Singles from Abominations
- 1. "Dude, Where's My Skin?" Released: August 8, 2007; 2. "The Plastic Surgery Hall of Fame" Released: August 23, 2007

Abominations is the third and final studio album by Seattle horror punk band Schoolyard Heroes. The album was recorded in January 2007 over the course of 18 days, and released on September 18 of the same year. The production of the album was handled entirely by John Goodmanson with the majority of the lyrics composed by the band's singer and frontwoman Ryann Donnelly. Donnelly serves as the main singer on the album, with bassist Jonah Bergman performing backing vocals.

Envisioned as an album about falling in love during the apocalypse, the album was inspired by horror films, with the lyrics composed from themes such as death and tragedy. The album presents its themes in a theatrical, over-the-top and often campy style. It was promoted by two singles; lead single "Dude, Where's My Skin?" and "The Plastic Surgery Hall of Fame". Both songs received music videos directed by Brian and Brad Palmer.

In early 2008, the band completed a nationwide tour, opening for the Seattle-based band Aiden. The album received positive reviews from music critics, who praised Donnelly's singing, the often melodic composition, and the morbid themes expressed on the project. While a critical success, the album failed to achieve any chart positions. The album generated some controversy from concerned individuals who accused the album of promoting satanism and murder. The band announced their breakup on November 20, 2009, which meant that Abominations was their last album together as a group.

== Background ==
Following the release of Schoolyard Heroes' sophomore album, Fantastic Wounds, the band had begun to find commercial success in not only the Seattle rock scene, but in Olympia and other cities in Washington. The band had generated enough interest to eventually be signed to an imprint label of Island Def Jam Music Group. Record producer John Goodmanson took interest in the band and served as the producer for Abominations, their third studio album. Goodmanson had previously attracted success as a producer for established acts such as Blondie and The Blood Brothers. All four members of the band remain on the project, with Donnelly serving as the main writing force.

== Writing and recording ==
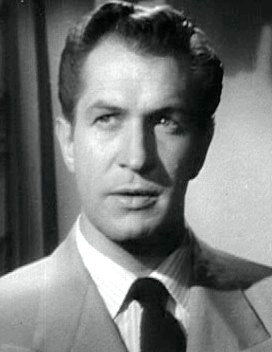
Vintage horror films served as an inspiration for the album. Donnelly admitted to being an admirer of horror actor Vincent Price.

Like all of the band's projects, the album takes several of its themes from b-movies and horror films. Horror films had always been a substantial influence on the band; bassist Jonah Bergman's father had taken him to double features as a kid. Donnelly had admired horror actor Vincent Price and wished to present vintage horror aesthetic into the project. Brian K. Vaughan's dystopian comic book Y: The Last Man served as inspired for the song "Cemetery Girls". Bergman was credited for writing the hook on "The Plastic Surgery Hall of Fame".

The album contains elements of concept albums, with the album taking place during the apocalypse. Donnelly had stated that the album is what would happen to a couple's relationship during the end of the world. The narrative of the album centers around the premise of every single male in the entire world suddenly dropping dead, and what would happen if all males spontaneously died for no apparent reason. In an interview with Sentimentalist Magazine, Donnelly went into detail about the composition of the album, stating

"We've literally written about horror movies, like straight from the screen kind of thing, but this one is about horrific human beings and human nature, and the dark side of things, and there's still a lot of beautiful ways to sort of twist that and write about that. And "Cemetery Girls," is about all of the men just dying, for no apparent reason, and these women are rising up and taking over the world, and it's sort of the mixture of emotion that comes with things ending. Particularly this apocalyptic setting where there's a lot of death, but also strength that rises from it."

While the album goes over fictional themes, Donnelly noted that the album still contained real-world social commentary. Donnelly mused, "when you look at the news, it's really easy to get sucked into this mentality of is the world coming to an end?" and assured that she still wanted the album to be something you could dance to. To prevent the album from being to depressing, the band attempted to present the album with the aesthetic of a b-movie, with a comical, overly theatrical tone. Bergman stated that while the album goes go over dark topics and contains graphic imagery, the band wanted to offer the listeners something positive in nature. He warned people not to look to deep into the music and stated that the band was a way for the members to vent.

Abominations was recorded in 18 days, which Donnelly described as the most "delightful, pleasurable recording experience", commenting that she was saddened when the band had run out of material to record. The band spent their loose time watching episodes of classic horror series like The Twilight Zone and The Outer Limits.

== Content ==
"All the Pretty Corpses"
In "All the Pretty Corpses", Donnelly sings over a muted, subdued guitar riff before breaking out in a guttural scream.

"Violence is All the Rage"
"Violence is All the Rage" features Donnelly singing over a chugging guitar melody.

Album opener "Dude, Where's My Skin?" begins the album with horror-movie imagery. The track opens with the disturbing refrain of "take off your skin and dance with me" with Donnelly screaming in an operatic manner, over eerie guitar riffs. "The Plastic Surgery Hall of Fame" features guttural screaming from both Donnelly and Bergman, with the song serving as a duet between the two. Bergman's bass is less pronounced on the track, allowing the two trade lines more clearly. Donnelly sings the line "you're so pretty" while Bergman screams back "you're so dead!" in a "demonic tone". Donnelly declares the line "I am the devil and I've come to do the devil's work" on track "Cemetery Girls", morbidly referencing the famous line spoken by serial killer Charles "Tex" Watson, member of the Manson Family. The track has a highly melodic riff and Donnelly screams her verses "like a battle cry".

"Violence is All the Rage", despite the alarming title, has been described as having similarities with pop music in nature. While the's song's subject matter may be disturbing, the production and vocal arrangements have been described as something that could be a backing to a Kelly Clarkson track. The track switches from heavy metal verses to disco-influenced choruses, and Donnelly's performance on the track has been compared to No Doubt era Gwen Stefani.

"Children of The Night" features a chugging guitar in the style of math rock, with a percussive breakdown with eerie gothic moaning. The more horror-themed tone of the album takes a break on "The Last Man on Earth", which is a tender ballad. The track is an exercise in desperation, with Donnelly singing "you and I are the King and Queen of nothing" amongst a haunting guitar-based platform. Donnelly asserts that her "lipstick tastes like murder" on "Razorblade Kisses" which contains guitar playing in the style of post-hardcore music. "Sometimes They Come Back" has been compared to the type of music produced by bands At the Drive-In and The Blood Brothers. "Beautiful Woman Hunter" offers a showcase for Brian Turner's drums and cymbal performance, and Steve Bonell's guitar which shifts from slower portions to a chaotic, punk-ish breakdown. The song exhibits Donnelly's more scream-heavy singing.

"All the Pretty Corpses" is more poppy in nature, with epic, disparate sonic elements juxtaposed against more rock-centric riffing. Album closer "Screaming "Theater" in a Crowded Fire" begins like a musical at first, and then transforms into a showcase for Bonell's continuously evolving riffs. The track is a macabre love song between a murderer and her victim, and contains the only time on the album when Donnelly and Bergman trade verses outside of a chorus. The track features the two intimately singing together, with Bergman shouting the visceral line "you smeared my blood like a whore's mascara" back at Donnelly.

== Promotion ==
Lead single "Dude, Where's My Skin?" debuted on the website PureVolume on August 8, 2007. "The Plastic Surgery Hall of Fame" was chosen as the second single, and received a music video helmed by Brian and Brad Palmer. The video features kids in a cult, and was followed by a music video for "Dude, Where's My Skin?" The band embarked on a nationwide tour, opening for the Seattle-based band Aiden in support for the album. Donnelly expressed that performing was an important aspect to her music, stating that "the more visceral a response the audience can have, the better. I don't ever want to hide behind pyrotechnics, or too much show. I think that we are a really solid live band and really solid performers, and our music is the most important element of the equation. If your music isn't there, it's not going to matter; it's just going to be a circus." The album was released onto iTunes on September 17.

== Controversy ==
EarCandy, a Seattle-based music blog, had printed an irate letter authored from an anonymous writer. The writer described the band as avowed satanists, accusing the band of wanting to corrupt the nation's children and "drive them to murder with their fascination with the dark and evil world of Satan." The letter had attracted the interest of the newspaper Seattle Post Intelligencer, who published the story. Once the newspaper had published the story, readers visited the website of the band, with one commenting that the content had horrified him, stating that the band's lyrics glorified "death, dismemberment, murder and suicide." A group of concerned parents were so offended by the gruesome nature of the band's lyrics that they were motivated to form a petition against the band. The petition read that they were attempting to stop a tragedy before it began, and accused of the band of promoting satanism.

Spin magazine interviewed Bergman about the accusations presented against the band, and Bergman assured that the parents were simply out of touch with their kids, calling the outrage ridiculous. Bergman incited parents to talk to their children, assuring that the parents were underestimating the intelligence of their kids. He noted that the members of the petition had "clearly never heard our music or seen our shows", and that the band wasn't about worshipping the devil, but having a good time.

== Reception ==
Professional ratings
Review scores
Source	Rating
Three Imaginary Girls	8/10 stars
AbsolutePunk	8.1/10
Seattle Post Intelligencer	(favorable)
Exclaim!	(favorable)
Sentimentalist Magazine	(favorable)
Allmusic	(favorable)
Seattle Weekly	(favorable)

Website Three Imaginary Girls commented that the production on the album was pristine and mature, with the songs "teeming with sinister chords and spine-tingly good vocals." They continued, writing that Abominations was the "perfect soundtrack for this ghoulish, All Hallows Eve season." Blake Solomon of AbsolutePunk noted that he wasn't generally a fan of horror imagery, but commented that "the tales told within Abominations can get gruesome, but the flair and range of near-undead songstress Ryann Donnelly gives me just enough courage to continue on, soiled underwear and all." Exclaim!'s Sam Sutherland mused that the album was more accessible than their first two albums, writing "it's great to know that after two fantastic, almost wholly ignored albums Schoolyard Heroes aren't giving up. In fact, they're getting better".

Carrie Alison of Sentimentalist Magazine praised the album and viewed that Donnelly was destined to be the female equivalent Gerard Way, commenting "horror-punk be damned, I'll meet these guys behind the gym anytime." Allmusic reported that the album "is full of surprisingly catchy songs, which shouldn't imply even remotely that the Schoolyard Heroes have turned pop. Quite the opposite. The angsty, horrorshow feeling of both the lyrics and the sonics are heavier than ever, belying both the appearance of the band (who look like art school geeks) and the immediate appeal of the music." Travis Hay of Seattle Post Intelligencer felt that the band had shown impressive growth from their first two albums, and critiqued that the album "is chock full of playfully gruesome, over-the-top lyrics (i.e. "You smeared my blood like a whore's mascara"), though it won't leave you with nightmares. Instead you'll be left with 11 wickedly fierce songs from Seattle's favorite fearsome foursome." Hannah Levin of Seattle Weekly wrote that the hiring of John Goodmanson was a wise decision, commenting that his production "revs up the band's inherent vitriol and pageantry while razor-tuning the goth-pop notes for broader appeal without blunting the edges." According to Levin, tracks like "Cemetery Girls" and "All the Pretty Corpses" sound like "darkly catchy future teen anthems".

== Track listing ==
No.	Title	Length
1.	"Dude, Where's My Skin?"	2:45
2.	"The Plastic Surgery Hall of Fame"	3:21
3.	"Cemetery Girls"	5:14
4.	"Violence is All the Rage"	3:10
5.	"Children of the Night"	3:45
6.	"The Last Man on Earth"	3:22
7.	"Razorblade Kisses"	3:31
8.	"Sometimes They Come Back"	4:37
9.	"Beautiful Woman Hunter"	4:33
10.	"All the Pretty Corpses"	5:15
11.	"Screaming "Theater" in a Crowded Fire"	5:58

== Personnel ==
Information taken from Abominations liner notes.

- Nabil Ayers - management
- Jonah Bergman - primary artist, bass, guitar, vocals, backing vocals
- Jonah Berman - choir
- Blag Dahlia - pre-production
- Steve Bonnell - primary artist, guitar,
- Cemetery Girl Choir - additional personnel, performer
- Zach Davidson - choir/chorus, backing vocals
- Ryann Donnelly - primary artist, choir, vocals, backing vocals, guitar
- John Goodmanson - audio engineer, audio production, engineer, mixing, producer
- Elie Goral - assistant photographer
- Nouela Johnston - choir
- Nouela Oake Johnston - additional Personnel, keyboards, piano, backing vocals
- Sarah Lewitinn - A&R
- Nate Manny - art direction, design
- Christian McKnight - management
- Ashley Redshaw - choir, backing vocals
- Caitlin Schooley - choir, backing vocals
- Maureen Trantham - choir, backing vocals
- Brian Turner - primary artist, drummer
- Melissa Yaden - choir, backing vocals
