= Ryann Donnelly =

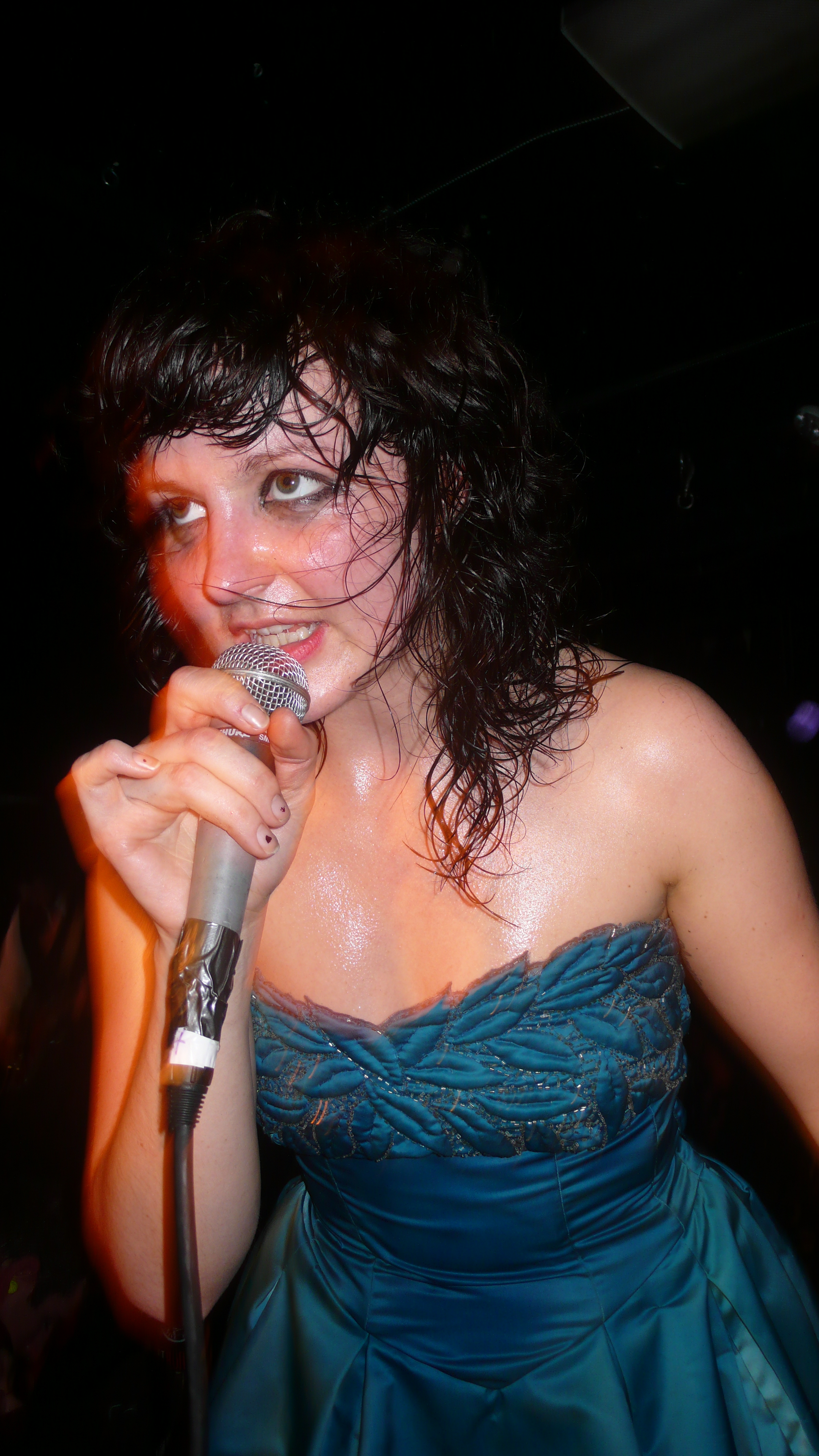

Background information
- Genres: Punk, Shock rock, Pop music
- Labels: The Control Group, The Lonely Hearts Singles Club

Ryann Donnelly was born in Olympia, Washington. With friends from high school Jonah Bergman and Steve Bonnell, Ryann formed the band Schoolyard Heroes. Their debut album was The Funeral Sciences, and their second album, Fantastic Wounds, was a cult hit. In 2007 Schoolyard Heroes released Abominations, for which two music videos were made. Abominations received generally positive reviews from music critics. The band announced their break-up on November 20, 2009.

Ryann started a similar band, Blood Cells, with Jonah Bergman and two new members in early 2010. After only a few shows together, Ryann left the band and moved to New York, where she started producing pop music through her own label The Lonely Hearts Singles Club. Ryann played similar pop music with Mark Gajadhar, drummer of The Blood Brothers, as the duo Weekend.

Ryann currently lives in London, where she completed a Ph.D. at Goldsmiths, University of London. She has recently been performing in gallery settings, providing a live soundtrack for audio visual installations. She released an edited version of her Ph.D. thesis called "Justify My Love: Sex, Subversion, and Music Video" in April 2019.

Musically, Ryann has expressed influences from singers such as Courtney Love and Madonna.
