= Muzzle =

Muzzle may refer to:

- Muzzle (anatomy) or snout, the projecting parts of the face (including the nose and mouth) of an animal
  - Muzzle (mouth guard), a device that covers an animal's snout
- Muzzle (firearms), the mouth of a firearm
- Muzzle (band), a band based in Seattle, Washington, U.S.
- "Muzzle" (song), a song by the Smashing Pumpkins from Mellon Collie and the Infinite Sadness
- Muzzle, a character in Road Rovers
- Muzzle (Ninjago), a character in Ninjago
- Muzzle (film), a 2023 film starring Aaron Eckhart

== See also ==
- Flash suppressor
- Muzzle booster
- Muzzle brake
- "Muzzle #1", a song by The Whip
- Muzzle law (disambiguation)
- Muzzle shroud
