= Jeff Rouse (musician) =

American bassist (born 1969)

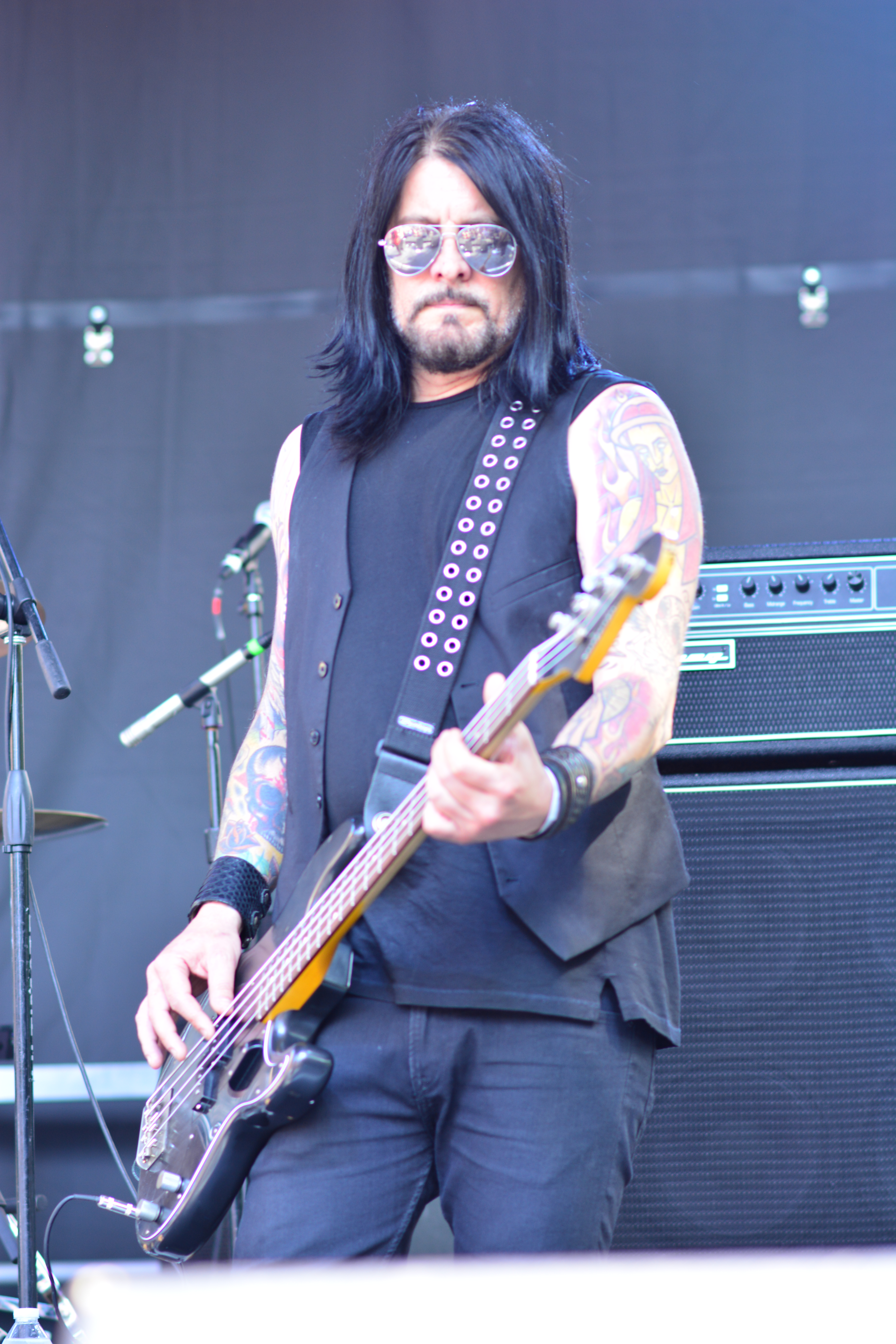
- Rouse performing in 2019

Background information
- Born: June 7, 1969 (age 57)
- Origin: Tacoma, Washington, U.S.
- Genres: Pop rock, hard rock, punk rock, alternative rock
- Occupation: Bassist
- Years active: 1997–present
- Labels: Revolution, Collective Fruit, Will Records, V2, The Control Group, Century Media, Eagle Rock Entertainment
- Member of: Loaded
- Formerly of: Alien Crime Syndicate, Sirens Sister, Vendetta Red, Fozzy

Jeff Rouse is an American musician who is best known as the bassist for the rock bands Alien Crime Syndicate and Duff McKagan's Loaded. In September 2014, Rouse joined Fozzy and stayed with the band until 2015. Previously, Rouse was a member of a number of Seattle-based groups such as Vendetta Red and Sirens Sister while he also has his own solo project titled To the Glorious Lonely and The Gemini Affair.

Rouse was also a member of the live band, along with his Alien Crime Syndicate bandmates, of Tommy Stinson (Guns N' Roses, formerly The Replacements), who, at the time, was touring in support of his solo album Village Gorilla Head.

== Biography ==
=== Alien Crime Syndicate (1997–2001, 2002–2005) ===
In 1997, Rouse joined Alien Crime Syndicate, formed by former The Meices frontman Joe Reineke in San Francisco, where the group managed to secure a major-label record deal with Revolution Records, a subsidiary of Giant Records and recorded an album with producer Gil Norton. However the record label folded and ACS lost the rights to From the Word Go and relocated to Seattle and began re-recording songs from the first unreleased record as well as new material for what would be Dust to Dirt, released on ACS drummer Nabil Ayers' own label Collective Fruit, in February 2000. The first record became available and was released by Will Records in July 2000.

After a stint with Loaded, Rouse rejoined ACS while his Loaded bandmate Mike Squires, also formerly of Nevada Bachelors and Harvey Danger, was added to the lineup to record their third album XL from Coast to Coast. Released in 2002 through Nabil Ayers' label The Control Group (which was then picked up and released by V2), XL from Coast to Coast showed an updated sound, incorporating influences like The Replacements and Urge Overkill. After a short break the band regrouped and released their fourth and final album Ten Songs in the Key of Betrayal and toured with Tommy Stinson, formerly of The Replacements and current Guns N' Roses bassist, in support of his solo release Village Gorilla Head. They also performed as his backing band for the shows.

=== Loaded (2002, 2006, 2008–present) ===
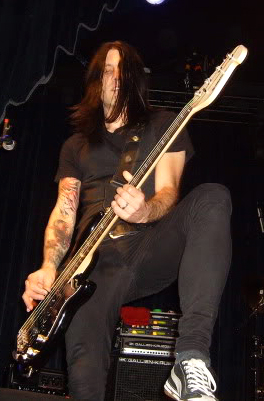
Rouse performing with Loaded at The Assembly, Leamington Spa in 2009

In 2002, Rouse was added to the new lineup of Loaded, the group formed by former Guns N' Roses bassist Duff McKagan, touring in support of debut album Dark Days. In January 2002, Loaded announced a string of dates in the US and Japan. During one of the shows, in Los Angeles, Loaded were joined onstage by The Cult duo Billy Duffy and Matt Sorum, also formerly of Guns N' Roses. After the tour of Japan, Rouse left Loaded to rejoin Alien Crime Syndicate along with Mike Squires. Following the formation of Velvet Revolver, Loaded went on a semi-hiatus with the band playing a few shows each year with both Rouse and Squires returning to the group.

In December 2006, the group reunited for a special benefit show for Jerry Allen's Cancer Fund. Supporting Loaded that night were Top Heavy Crush and Jeff Angell of Post Stardom Depression.

In February 2008, while on tour with Velvet Revolver, McKagan announced that Loaded were planning on releasing a new album in the summer. During the UK leg of Velvet Revolver's tour in April, McKagan stated that Loaded were to enter the studio in later in the month. After a few jam sessions, Loaded began recording what would become Sick with Dark Days producer Martin Feveyear at Jupiter Studios in Seattle. They released a series of Webisodes during this time featuring footage from the recording sessions for the group's new album which was completed in less than 2 weeks. After signing a deal with Century Media, the band changed their moniker to Duff McKagan's Loaded to help promote the band further and an EP, Wasted Heart, was released September 22, 2008, to coincide with their European Tour. Sick was released on March 20, 2009, in Europe and April 7, 2009, in the United States where it placed at number 43 on the Billboard Heatseekers Chart selling 1,400 copies. Loaded toured in support of Sick playing dates in the United States and appearing at several European festivals such as Download in the United Kingdom, Rock AM/IM in Germany and they also supported Mötley Crüe on their European tour. The band continued to tour and were announced as the main support for Black Stone Cherry, along with New Jersey group The Parlor Mob, during their tour of Europe and the United Kingdom.

During the Jane's Addiction shows taking place at the GelreDome, in Arnhem, Netherlands, and their appearance at the Rock in Rio in Madrid, Spain, Rouse was Duff McKagan's bass tech. During this time, he and McKagan recorded a "Loaded/Jane's Addiction webisode" in Amsterdam.

On July 4, 2010, the band announced they were to begin pre-production and enter the studio in August to record the follow-up to Sick stating:

'We have been writing for the last few months and next week we start pre-production on the new Loaded record! We couldn't be happier and we think you fuckers will be, too! As it is looking, we will be recording it in August and thus begins Loaded Mach III!'

In August, it was announced that the group were to record their new album with producer Terry Date, whose production credits include albums by Soundgarden, Pantera and Deftones among others.

On September 2, it was announced that the album was completed and that the group were looking for a label. McKagan also stated that it was Date that approached the group about producing their new album.

=== Vendetta Red (2005–2006) ===
In 2005, Rouse joined Vendetta Red, replacing previous bassist Michael Vermillion, on their tour to support their latest album Sisters of the Red Death. However, on March 8, 2006, the group announced they were to disband and they played their final show at El Corazon in Seattle, Washington on April 8, 2006. They ended their set with A Joyless Euphoria.

=== Sirens Sister (2006–2007) ===
In 2006, following the breakup of Vendetta Red, former members Zach Davidson, Leif Andersen and Rouse, as well as local drummer Ben Libay, formed Sirens Sister, initially in Bakersfield, California before relocating to Seattle. Influenced by the likes of U2, Simple Minds, Duran Duran and Echo & the Bunnymen the group signed with The Control Group and recorded their debut album Echoes from the Ocean Floor, released the same year, with producer Martin Feveyear. In 2007 Rouse left the group and was replaced by Andersen's brother, Levi Andersen, on bass.

=== To the Glorious Lonely (2008–present) ===
During an interview in 2008, Rouse announced he had his own solo project he was working on while he was in Loaded. Rouse is the sole member however members of his previous groups such as Alien Crime Syndicate, Sirens Sister and his current band Loaded join him onstage during live shows such as at the Skylark Cafe & Club in Seattle, Washington where he was joined by Alien Crime Syndicate bandmate Joe Reineke who played bass for the show. On February 4, 2009, Rouse announced via the To the Glorious Lonely MySpace that he was to finish the debut record while Loaded were waiting for the release of Sick in April. A number of songs are available via the official To the Glorious Lonely Myspace page.

=== Fozzy (2014–2015) ===
In May 2014, it was announced Rouse would replace Paul Di Leo in Fozzy as bass guitarist for their upcoming tour. In September he was named as a permanent member of the band, but didn't appear with them on their European tour in March 2015, being replaced by guitarist Rich Ward's Stuck Mojo bandmate Corey Lowery.

=== The Gemini Affair (2018–present) ===
On May 11, 2018, Rouse's newest band "The Gemini" released an EP titled "The Gemini Affair". Recorded and mixed by Don Gunn at The Office. With Jeff Rouse, Keith Ash and Don Gunn producing. The EP shows a darker side to Rouses material and guest stars Barrett Martin, Keith Ash, Ryan Waters, Shawn Zellar, Chris Walla, Gary Westlake, Don Gunn, Jen Ayers and Kathy Moore. On May 1, 2018, In collaboration with Ponda – A short film by Rikki Udagawa featuring "Princess Miss Darkness (Official Video)" from "The Gemini" was released on YouTube. The band stays very active around the Seattle area.

=== Other work ===
On February 28, 2010, Rouse, along with Loaded bandmate Duff McKagan, performed at the Hootenanny For Haiti at the Showbox at the Market in Seattle along with the likes of Pearl Jam guitarist Mike McCready, Fastbacks bassist Kim Warnick as well as Truly and former Screaming Trees drummer Mark Pickerel among others.

A number of songs were covered during the show, including Belinda Carlisle's "Heaven Is a Place on Earth", Hank Williams' "I'm So Lonesome I Could Cry", The Rolling Stones' "Dead Flowers" among others. One of the most notable covers came when Mike McCready performed a cover of "River of Deceit" by his former group Mad Season for the first time since his time with the band with Rouse performing vocal duties on the song.

In September 2010, Rouse performed another "Hootenanny" this time the 'Hootenanny for a Healthy Gulf which included the musicians from the previous show.

== Discography ==
Title	Release	Label	Band
Supernatural	1999	American Pop Project	Alien Crime Syndicate
Dust to Dirt	2000	Collective Fruit	Alien Crime Syndicate
From the Word Go	2000	Will	Alien Crime Syndicate
XL from Coast to Coast	2002	The Control Group/V2	Alien Crime Syndicate
Ten Songs in the Key of Betrayal	2004	The Control Group	Alien Crime Syndicate
Echoes from the Ocean Floor	2006	The Control Group	Sirens Sister
Wasted Heart	2008	Century Media	Loaded
Sick	2009	Century Media	Loaded
The Taking	2011	Eagle Rock Entertainment	Loaded
