= Vendetta Red =

American alternative rock band

- Origin: Seattle, Washington, U.S.
- Genres: Alternative rock; screamo; post-hardcore; emo; post-grunge
- Years active: 1998–2006, 2010–present
- Labels: Epic, Sony, Loveless, Cleopatra
- Spinoffs: Sirens Sister
- Members: Zach Davidson; Burke Thomas; Jonah Bergman; Leif Andersen
- Past members: Michael Vermillion; Justin Cronk; Eric Chapman; Joseph Childres; Adam Garcia; Jeff Rouse
- Website: www.facebook.com/VendettaRed/

Vendetta Red is an American alternative rock band from Seattle, Washington, that was formed in 1998. They released an EP, 6 Kisses, A Blatant Reminder of Why We Are Alive, in 1999 and two albums, Blackout Analysis in 2000 and White Knuckled Substance in 2001, before signing their first major label deal with Epic Records.

Their first release on Epic, Between the Never and the Now, charted at No. 1 on the Billboard Top Heatseekers and No. 101 on the Billboard 200 in 2003 with the album's single, "Shatterday", peaking at No. 16 on the Billboard Modern Rock Tracks chart.

The group's fourth album, Sisters of the Red Death, was released in 2005 and charted at No. 21 on the Top Heatseeker's Chart. After a series of lineup changes, the group disbanded in 2006, but announced a reunion four years later.

== History ==
=== Early career (1998–2002) ===
The group was formed in 1998 by Erik Chapman, Joseph Childres, Justin Cronk, Zach Davidson, Adam Garcia, and Mike Vermillion in Seattle, Washington and nearly a year later they issued their debut release, the 6 Kisses, A Blatant Reminder of Why We Are Alive EP with a tour of the West Coast following after. A year later, they released their first album, Blackout Analysis, with their second album, White Knuckled Substance, being released by Loveless Records in October the next year, which was well received by local radio, with the band continuing to tour on the West Coast. During their tour, they gained the attention of a number of labels and eventually signed with Epic Records in 2002.

=== Major label years (2003–2006) ===
After finishing recording with the late Jerry Finn, the group's first major label album Between the Never and the Now, which was preceded by the EP Cut Your Noose, was released in June 2003 and charted at No. 1 on the Billboard Top Heatseekers and No. 101 on the Billboard 200. The album's single, Shatterday, peaked at No. 16 on the Billboard Alternative Songs chart. The album included reworked songs from their previous release, White Knuckled Substance. The band supported the album with a North American tour, which included a stint on the Warped Tour. The song The Long Goodbye, from the album White Knuckled Substance, was included on the Warped Tour 2002 Tour Compilation.

After opening for AC/DC at the New York Roseland Ballroom, singer Zach Davidson said that the fans during the show were acting "blatantly homophobic":

"It was scary how blatantly homophobic a lot of that crowd is. AC/DC's music, whether you like it or not, is not socially conscious. You wanna drink, fuck, and smoke weed when you listen to AC/DC... and eat steak. Fuckin' American dream. I can handle anything, but I didn't really like it when, before you play a fucking note, the minute you go onstage, people are yelling 'Faggot!' That, of course, made me have to go down there and start kissing boys."

They continued to tour, playing with the likes of Dashboard Confessional, Brand New and MxPx.

The group entered the studio in 2004 with the producer Howard Benson to record the follow-up to Between the Never and the Now. For the album, Childres switched to keyboards with Burke Thomas added to the group to record drums. The drummer from Street Drum Corps, Bobby Alt, contributed theremin to the album while Phil Perrone contributed backing vocals. The album, titled Sisters of the Red Death, was released in 2005 and charted at No. 21 on the Top Heatseeker's Chart.

Late in 2004, Chapman and Childres left the group and the guitarist Leif Andersen of Common Heroes and Pris joined the band on lead guitar and keyboards. In late 2005 Vermillion left the band and bass guitarist Jeff Rouse, of Alien Crime Syndicate and Loaded was added to the group.

=== Breakup (2006) ===
Vendetta Red announced on MySpace on March 8, 2006, that they were going separate ways to create different styles of music. Davidson later made the following statement:

"A few good things happened to us, a lot of bad things happened to us. A lot of people wanted to kill us. We were always outsiders. We were always alone, and after a 7 year legacy of struggle and torment we now have to posthumously defend the ghost of a band that meant everything to me. Regardless we always told the truth even if it meant alienating ourselves from everyone, and I continue to do so. If you would like to know more write me at myspace.com/sirenssister and I will try to answer any questions you might have. I don't have any idea who runs the Vendetta Red website, thanks friends."

Vendetta Red played their final show at El Corazon in Seattle, Washington, on April 8, 2006. They ended their set with "A Joyless Euphoria".

=== Post-breakup (2006–2010) ===
Following the breakup, Davidson, Andersen and Rouse formed Sirens Sister in 2006 along with the drummer Ben Libey. They signed to The Control Group and released their first album, Echoes from the Ocean Floor, in September 2006, produced by Martin Feveyear. In 2007, Rouse left the group and was replaced by Andersen's brother, Levi Andersen, on bass guitar with the group going on to release Unspeakable Things in 2009 on The Control Group recorded by John Goodmanson and mixed by Martin Feveyear in Seattle.

Vermillion enjoyed a solo career now playing his own folk and American roots songs as well as covering many classic but perhaps lesser-known American country artists such as Townes Van Zandt, Merle Haggard and Jim Croce. He plays shows frequently in the Seattle area and also DJs under the name "Sad Bastard", usually playing country, Motown, folk and soul. His first official full-length solo album was released on May 21, 2008.

Cronk is now playing drums for With Friends Like These. The band includes fellow Bakersfield native Matthew Shaw, local producer Tyler Coffey and Brian Pake. Cronk owns a recording studio with bandmate Coffey in Seattle called The Toy Box.

Chapman has been enjoying life outside of the music industry as a bar tender at a Seattle area up-scale bar. He was married in 2006 to Andrea and they currently reside in the Ballard neighborhood of Seattle.

Their song "Silhouette Serenade" is used in the video game Saints Row.

Childres was playing for Blood Hot Beat. He was reported dead on June 3, 2020.

Thomas formed a band called Megasapien with Lian Light (formerly of Magneto). Their second album was expected to be released at the end of March 2011.

=== Reunion (2010–present) ===
In December 2010, it was announced that Vendetta Red would reunite for a one-off show at El Corazon in Seattle on March 5, 2011. This turned out to be an extended reunion. The band members later announced they had also begun working on new material and had enlisted the noted rock/metal producer Terry Date to produce what would be their first album in six years.

Vendetta Red performed some of this new material at Bumbershoot 2011, as well as material from their previous studio albums, a Sirens Sister song, and a solo (Davidson) acoustic version of Seconds Away. A new song called Blank Screens was released on January 15, 2012 as a single on various digital music services including iTunes, and the album title Scripture was announced.

On January 24, 2017, Vendetta Red announced on their Facebook page that they had signed with Cleopatra Records and were in the process of recording the new album. The album, titled Quinceañera, was released on April 13, 2018.

== Band members ==
=== Current members ===
- Zach Davidson – lead vocals, guitars, piano, organ, tambourine, glockenspiel, percussion (since 1998)
- Leif Andersen – lead guitar, lap steel, mandolin, violin, keyboards, programming, synthesizers, backing vocals (since 2005)
- Jonah Bergman - bass guitar (since 2010)
- Burke Thomas – drums, percussion (since 2004)

=== Past members ===
- Eric Chapman – guitar (1998–2004)
- Justin Cronk – guitar (2000–2006; died 2022)
- Michael Vermillion – bass guitar (2000–2005)
- Joseph Childres – drums, percussion, keyboards (1998–2004; died 2020)
- Jeff Rouse – bass guitar (2005–2006)
- Adam Garcia - drums (1998-1999)

== Discography ==
=== Studio album ===
- Blackout Analysis (2000)
- White Knuckled Substance (2001)
- Between the Never and the Now (2003)
- Sisters of the Red Death (2005)
- Quinceañera (2018)

=== EPs ===
- 6 Kisses, A Blatant Reminder of Why We Are Alive (1999)
- Cut Your Noose EP (2002)
- Shatterday EP (2003)
- Scripture (2013)
- Light Year Anniversary (2013)

=== Singles ===
Year	Title	Chart positions	Album
Year	Title	Alternative Songs	Album
2003	"Shatterday"	16	Between the Never and the Now
2005	"Silhouette Serenade"	—	Sisters of the Red Death
2012	"Close to Me"	—	Scripture

== See also ==
- List of Warped Tour lineups by year
