= Jeff Rouse =

Jeff Rouse may refer to:

- Jeff Rouse (swimmer)
- Jeff Rouse (musician)
