= Ten Songs in the Key of Betrayal =

Studio album by Alien Crime Syndicate
- Released: Apr 20, 2004
- Recorded: Recorded at Orbit Audio, Seattle, Washington
- Genres: Hard rock, alternative rock, indie rock
- Labels: The Control Group; EMI (Japan)
- Producers: Joe Reineke, Gil Norton

Alien Crime Syndicate chronology
XL from Coast to Coast (2002)	Ten Songs in the Key of Betrayal (2004)

Professional ratings
Review scores
Source	Rating
Allmusic	4/5 stars

Ten Songs in the Key of Betrayal is the fourth and final album by alternative rock group Alien Crime Syndicate released in 2004 through The Control Group and EMI.

== Track listing ==
No.	Title	Length
1.	"Forever is Rock N' Roll"	2:42
2.	"Rescue"	3:43
3.	"The American Way"	3:10
4.	"The Hustla Life"	3:11
5.	"Wake Up Theo"	4:06
6.	"Run for the Money"	2:14
7.	"Girls Got"	3:38
8.	"Soak in the Vibe"	3:17
9.	"Back Together"	4:27
10.	"Fall"	4:20
11.	"Do it Again" (Japanese Edition)
12.	"Ozzy" (Japanese Edition)

== Personnel ==
Alien Crime Syndicate

- Joe Reineke – vocals, guitar
- Jeff Rouse – bass, vocals
- Nabil Ayers – drums

Additional personnel

- Mike Davis – additional guitars on "Rescue", "The American Way", "Forever is Rock N' Roll"

Production personnel

- Joe Reineke – production, mixing
- Gil Norton – production
- Mike Easton – engineering
- Steve Carter – mixing
- Howie Weinberg – mastering
