= Burke Thomas =

American drummer

- Also known as: Burke Thomas Overdrive
- Genres: Alternative rock, indie rock, power pop, screamo
- Occupations: Musician, songwriter, record producer
- Instruments: Drums, Guitar, Bass, keyboards, vocals
- Years active: 1994–present
- Labels: Reprise, Warner Bros., Epic, Loveless
- Website: burkethomasoverdrive.com

Burke Thomas, also known as Burke Thomas Overdrive, is an American musician and record producer, who is the drummer of Duff McKagan's Loaded and Vendetta Red. Thomas began his career with the band Muzzle, recording on the studio album Betty Pickup in 1996, before forming a solo project entitled Pris, performing all the instruments on the album The Kiss Off, released in 2004.

Thomas first joined Vendetta Red in 2001, recording on their fourth album Sisters of the Red Death released in 2005. The album itself peaked at number 27 on the Billboard Top Heatseekers. When the band broke up in 2006, Thomas would go on to form a number of projects including The Treatment and Megasapien, releasing their debut album Surrender in 2011, before Vendetta Red reunited in 2010 to record a new album with producer Terry Date the following year. Burke filled in on drums for Duff McKagan's Loaded for the halftime show performance at the Seattle Seahawks vs. The New York Giants game in 2010. He has been the full time drummer for the band since 2011.

Drum Recovery Network on Jun 14, 2020 Burke Thomas launched the "Drum Recovery Network" on YouTube and AnchorFm. The series is aimed at helping musicians and non musicians who have suffered major injury heal through community, conversation and the power of positivity. Thomas covers a variety of subjects in the videos including album/band revues, spinal cord stretches/therapy and interviews. Guests of the show have included Dave Barbarossa (Bow Wow Wow), Martin Chambers of (The Pretenders), Kellii Scott (Failure), Chris Fantz (Talking Heads), Jerry Gaskill of (Kings X) and Don Coffey Jr. of (Superdrag).

== Discography ==
Pris

- The Kiss Off (2004)

with Muzzle

- Betty Pickup (1996)

with Vendetta Red

- Sisters of the Red Death (2005)

with Megasapien

- Surrender (2011)
