= The Tablet (disambiguation) =

The Tablet may refer to:

- The Tablet, an international Catholic weekly newspaper, published in London since 1840
- The Tablet (Brooklyn), a weekly Catholic newspaper published since 1908 by the Diocese of Brooklyn, New York
- The New Zealand Tablet, a former weekly Catholic newspaper published in New Zealand
- Tablet (magazine), an American Jewish online magazine

== See also ==
- Tablet (religious)
- Tablet (disambiguation)
