= XL from Coast to Coast =

Studio album by Alien Crime Syndicate
- Released: February 19, 2002
- Recorded: Recorded at Orbit Audio, Seattle, Washington
- Genre: Alternative rock, hard rock, indie rock, pop punk
- Label: V2, The Control Group
- Producer: Joe Reineke

Alien Crime Syndicate chronology
| From the Word Go (2000) | XL from Coast to Coast (2002) | Ten Songs in the Key of Betrayal (2004) |

Professional ratings
Review scores
| Source | Rating |
|---|---|
| AllMusic | 4/5 stars |
| Blender | 2/5 stars |

XL from Coast to Coast is the third album by alternative rock group Alien Crime Syndicate. It was released in 2002 through V2 and The Control Group, incorporating influences like The Replacements and Urge Overkill. The Japanese edition contains a cover of Elton John's "Don't Go Breaking My Heart" recorded with Duff McKagan and Kim Warnick.

== Track listing ==
All songs written by Joe Reineke, except where noted.

| No. | Title | Length |
|---|---|---|
| 1. | "Ozzy" | 3:33 |
| 2. | "Break the Record" | 2:15 |
| 3. | "My Happy Ending" | 3:11 |
| 4. | "Stronger" | 4:23 |
| 5. | "Figure It Out" | 3:06 |
| 6. | "Not Today" | 3:53 |
| 7. | "Softly" | 3:03 |
| 8. | "Ya Blink It's" | 3:22 |
| 9. | "Careless" | 4:08 |
| 10. | "Is It U" | 4:12 |
| 11. | "We Are" | 6:03 |
| 12. | "Don't Go Breaking My Heart" (Elton John, Bernie Taupin) (feat. Duff McKagan and Kim Warnick) (Japanese Edition) |

== Personnel ==
Alien Crime Syndicate

- Joe Reineke - vocals, guitar
- Mike Squires - guitar
- Jeff Rouse - bass, vocals
- Nabil Ayers - drums

Production personnel

- Joe Reineke - production, mixing
- Troy Tietjen - mixing
- Rick Fisher - mastering
