= Supernatural (EP) =

EP by Alien Crime Syndicate
- Released: 1999
- Genre: Rock, alternative rock
- Label: American Pop Project

Alien Crime Syndicate chronology
Supernatural (1999)	Dust to Dirt (2000)

Professional ratings
Review scores
Source	Rating
Allmusic	4/5 stars

Supernatural is an EP by American alternative rock band Alien Crime Syndicate and was released in 1999. There were two editions of the record available, a 7" Vinyl and a CD release, both with alternative track listings.

== Track listing ==
7" Vinyl
No.	Title	Length
1.	"Supernatural"
2.	"Really Got a "C""

CD Edition
No.	Title	Length
1.	"Trippin' Up to the Clouds"
2.	"Here With You"
3.	"You Found"
4.	"When I Get Home"
5.	"Pablo Picasso"

== Personnel ==
Alien Crime Syndicate

- Joe Reineke – vocals, guitar
- Jeff Rouse – bass, vocals
- Nabil Ayers – drums
