= Wax tablet =

Writing implement in antiquity

Wax tablet and a Roman stylus

A wax tablet is a tablet made of wood and covered with a layer of wax, often linked loosely to a cover tablet, as a "double-leaved" diptych. It was used as a reusable and portable writing surface in antiquity and throughout the Middle Ages. Cicero's letters make passing reference to the use of cerae, and some examples of wax-tablets have been preserved in waterlogged deposits in the Roman fort at Vindolanda on Hadrian's Wall. Medieval wax tablet books are on display in several European museums.

Writing on the wax surface was performed with a pointed instrument, a stylus. A straight-edged spatula-like implement (often placed on the opposite end of the stylus tip) would be used as an eraser. The modern expression of "a clean slate" equates to the Latin expression "tabula rasa".

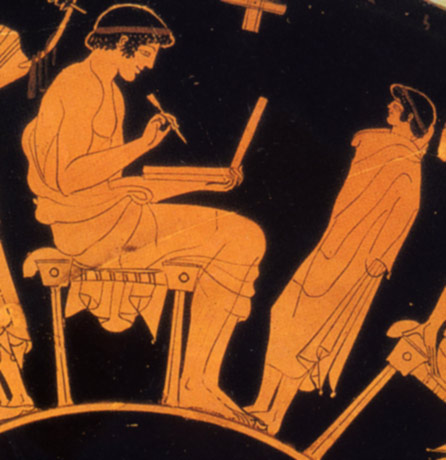
Writing with stylus and folding wax tablet. painter, Douris, c. 500 BC (Berlin).

Wax tablets were used for a variety of purposes, from taking down students' or secretaries' notes to recording business accounts. Early forms of shorthand were used too.

== Use in antiquity ==
The earliest surviving exemplar of a boxwood writing tablet with an ivory hinge was among the finds recovered from the 14th-century BC Uluburun Shipwreck near Kaş in modern Turkey in 1986. This find further confirmed that the reference to writing tablets in Homer was far from anachronistic. An archaeological discovery in 1979 in Durrës, Albania found two wax tablets made of ivory in a grave believed to belong to a money lender from the 2nd century AD.

The Greeks probably started using the folding pair of wax tablets, along with the leather scroll in the mid-8th century BC. Liddell & Scott, 1925 edition gives the etymology of the word for the writing-tablet, deltos (δέλτος), from the letter delta (Δ) based on ancient Greek and Roman authors and scripts, due to the shape of tablets to account for it. An alternative theory holds that it has retained its Semitic designation, daltu, which originally signified "door" but was being used for writing tablets in Ugarit in the 13th century BC. In Hebrew the term evolved into daleth.

In the first millennium BC writing tablets were in use in Mesopotamia as well as Syria and Southern Levant. A carved stone panel dating to between 640–615 BC that was excavated from the South-West Palace of the Assyrian ruler Sennacherib, at Nineveh in Iraq (British Museum, ME 124955) depicts two figures, one clearly clasping a scroll and the other bearing what is thought to be an open diptych. Berthe van Regemorter identified a similar figure in the Neo-Hittite Stela of Tarhunpiyas (Musée du Louvre, AO 1922.), dating to the late 8th century BC, who is seen holding what may be a form of tablature with a unique button closure. Writing tablets of ivory were found in the ruins of Sargon's palace in Nimrud. Margaret Howard surmised that these tablets might have once been connected together using an ingenious hinging system with cut pieces of leather resembling the letter "H" inserted into slots along the edges to form a concertina structure.

== Use in medieval to modern times ==
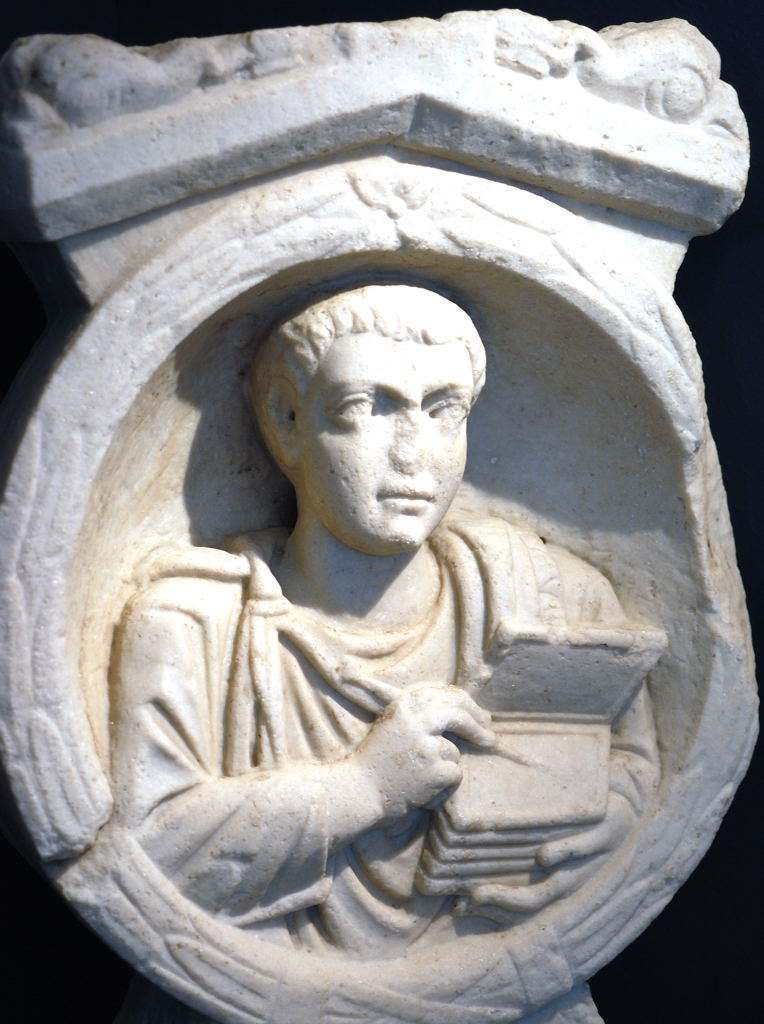
Roman scribe with his stylus and tablets on his tomb stele at Flavia Solva in Noricum

Hermann of Reichenau (1013–1054), a monk and mathematician, used wax tablets. Hériman of Tournai (1095–1147), a monk at the abbey of St Martin of Tournai, wrote "I even wrote down a certain amount on tablets".

An example of a wax tablet book are the servitude records which the hospital of Austria's oldest city, Enns, established in 1500. Ten wooden plates, sized 375 mm × 207 mm (14 3/4 by 8 1/8 inches) and arranged in a 90-millimetre (3 1/2-inch) stack, are each divided into two halves along their long axis. The annual payables due are written on parchment or paper glued to the left sides. Payables received were recorded for deduction (and subsequently erased) on the respective right sides, which are covered with brownish-black writing wax. The material is based on beeswax, and contains 5–10 % plant oils and carbon pigments; its melting point is about 65 °C (150 °F). This volume is the continuation of an earlier one, which was begun in 1447.

Wax tablets were used for high-volume business records of transient importance until the 19th century. For instance, the salt mining authority at Schwäbisch Hall employed wax records until 1812. The fish market in Rouen used them even until the 1860s, where their construction and use had been well documented in 1849.

== See also ==
- Symmachi–Nicomachi diptych
