= Dust to Dirt =

Studio album by Alien Crime Syndicate
- Released: Feb 8, 2000
- Recorded: Recorded at Jupiter Studios, Seattle, Washington
- Genre: Alternative rock, indie rock, pop punk
- Label: Collective Fruit
- Producer: Joe Reineke

Alien Crime Syndicate chronology
Supernatural (1999)	Dust to Dirt (2000)	From the Word Go (2000)

Professional ratings
Review scores
Source	Rating
Allmusic	3/5 stars

Dust to Dirt is the debut album by alternative rock group Alien Crime Syndicate released in 2000 through Collective Fruit. Following the folding of their previous label, Revolution Records, they relocated to Seattle, Washington and began re-recording songs from the first unreleased record, From the Word Go later released on Will Records, as well as new material released on Nabil Ayers's own label, Collective Fruit, in February, 2000.

== Track listing ==
All songs written by Joe Reineke.

No.	Title	Length
1.	"Take Me to Your Leader"	3:51
2.	"What I Said"	3:41
3.	"Outerspace"	3:44
4.	"Some Kind of Way"	3:23
5.	"I Want It All"	3:12
6.	"Tripping up to the Clouds"	3:54
7.	"Nothing Beats the Surf In"	2:12
8.	"Do It Again"	2:56
9.	"Pimpin' the Land"	3:15
10.	"Here With You"	3:46
11.	"Always Running"	3:38
12.	"Atmosphere"	6:24

== Personnel ==
Alien Crime Syndicate

- Joe Reineke – vocals, guitar
- Jason Krevey – guitar, vocals
- Jeff Rouse – bass, vocals
- Nabil Ayers – drums

Production personnel

- Joe Reineke – production, mixing
- Jon Ervie – engineering
- Jim Devito – mixing
- Howie Weinberg – mastering
