= Tyler Coffey =

American musician and record producer

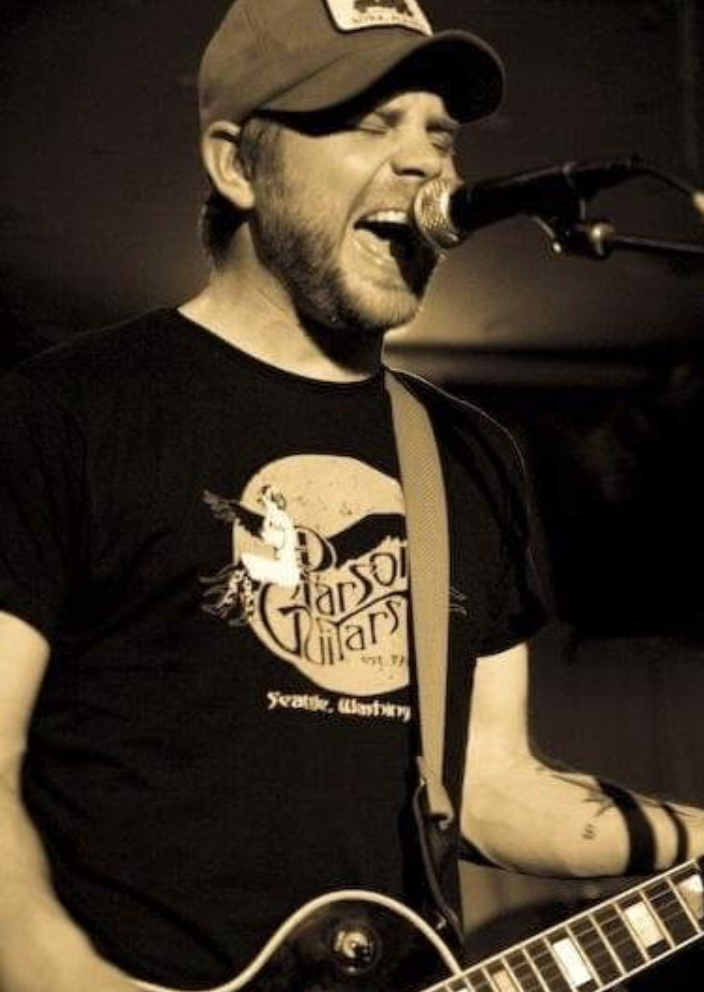
Coffey singing in "With Friends Like These" 2012

Tyler Coffey (born January 24, 1976) is a musician and record producer based in Seattle, Washington, and Los Angeles, California. He is known for playing guitar in "With Friends Like These" who signed to Sound vs. Silence Records in 2009. Their debut, Dead and Gone, was mixed by Barrett Jones (Foo Fighters, Nirvana, Pearl Jam). Soon after the release of the record, the band took a hiatus to pursue other things. Coffey is also a part-time player and contributor to Brad, featuring Shawn Smith and Stone Gossard.

In 2012 he created and executive produced "One Night Only" a television pilot featuring up and coming bands, collaborating with better known acts. He is currently working on pre-production for his first feature-length film, tentatively titled Conor Wayne which he wrote and will direct. The film is set to shoot in December 2018.

== The Toy Box ==
Coffey is also known for owning a recording studio in Seattle along with former Vendetta Red guitarist, Justin Cronk, called The Toy Box. The Studio is known for working with many Seattle indie acts. In June 2010, Coffey and Cronk upgraded at the studio, buying an analog Console from famed producer Matt Bayles. Mastodon, amongst many of Bayles' clients made records on the Console before it was moved to The Toy Box. Recent clients include Aqueduct, and Shawn Smith of Brad, Satchel, and Pigeonhed. Coffey also has been known to collaborate, and tour with Smith in his various projects in the past.
