= The Lonely H =

American rock band

- Origin: Port Angeles, WA
- Genres: Rock, indie rock
- Years active: 2003 – 2013
- Labels: The Control Group
- Members: Mark Fredson (vox, keys); Eric Whitman (guitar); Ben Eyestone (drums); Johnny Whitman (bass); Zach Setchfield (guitar)
- Past members: Colin Field (guitar, vox, cello) performed on "Kick Upstairs" and "Hair"

The Lonely H was an American rock band from Port Angeles, Washington. The band formed in the early 2000s by high school teenagers Mark Fredson (vox, keys), Eric Whitman (guitar), Ben Eyestone (drums) and Johnny Whitman (bass), while they were still in school.

In 2006, the group released its debut album with The Control Group, Kick Upstairs. They subsequently released their second full-length album, Hair. Their third album, Concrete Class, was released in June 2009. After touring extensively from July 2007 through March 2010, the band relocated to Nashville, Tennessee, where the band was joined by Zach Setchfield and they began working on their self-titled album The Lonely H.

== Discography ==
- Kick Upstairs (The Control Group - 2006)
- Hair (TCG - 2007)
- Concrete Class (TCG - 2009)
- The Lonely H (CEN/Self-released - 2013)
