= Between the Never and the Now =

Studio album by Vendetta Red
- Released: June 24, 2003
- Recorded: 2003
- Genres: Emo; post-hardcore; screamo; post-grunge
- Length: 40:52
- Label: Epic
- Producer: Jerry Finn

Vendetta Red chronology
Shatterday EP (2003)	Between the Never and the Now (2003)	Sisters of the Red Death (2005)

Singles from Between the Never and the Now
- 1. "Shatterday" Released: 2003

Professional ratings
Review scores
Source	Rating
AllMusic	3/5 stars
Alternative Press	3/5

Between the Never and the Now is the third album by Vendetta Red. It was released on June 24, 2003, as an Enhanced CD.

== Track listing ==
All lyrics are written by Zach Davidson; all music is composed by Vendetta Red.

1. "There Only Is" – 3:49
2. "Stay Home" – 2:55
3. "Opiate Summer" – 3:36
4. "Seconds Away" – 3:31
5. "Shatterday" – 2:39
6. "Accident Sex" – 3:01
7. "Caught You Like A Cold" – 2:44
8. "Suicide Party" – 2:59
9. "Lipstick Tourniquets" – 4:12
10. "Ambulance Chaser" – 3:20
11. "Por Vida" – 2:34
12. "P.S. Love The Black" – 5:26

== Notes ==
- "Shatterday" was released as a single.
- This is the first album by Vendetta Red on Epic Records.

== Personnel ==
Vendetta Red

- Zach Davidson – vocals, guitars
- Erik Chapman – guitars, keyboards, vocals
- Justin Cronk – guitars, vocals
- Michael Vermillion – bass, vocals
- Joseph Lee Childres – drums, vocals

Technical personnel

- Jerry Finn – producer, mixing
- Joe McGrath – engineer
- Brian Gardner – mastering

== Charts ==
Album - Billboard (United States)

Year	Chart	Position
2003	Heatseekers	1
2003	The Billboard 200	101
2003	Top Heatseekers	1

Singles - Billboard (United States)

Year	Single	Chart	Position
2003	"Shatterday"	Modern Rock Tracks	16
