= Dear John Letters =

Seattle rock band

- Origin: Seattle, Washington U.S.
- Genre: Rock
- Years active: 2000–present
- Labels: Roam Records; Foodchain Records
- Members: Robb Benson; Richard Davidson; Cassady Laton; Johnny Sangster
- Past members: Michelle Price

Dear John Letters was a Seattle, Washington-based rock band made up of Robb Benson, Richard Davidson, Cassady Laton, and Johnny Sangster.

== Formation and history ==
Robb Benson was born in Mount Vernon, Washington, and lived most of his early life in the area.

Benson's first band was the Seattle-based Nevada Bachelors, formed in 1997, who received national interest. When they disbanded, he recorded the Songs about Songs EP.

Benson then formed Dear John Letters, who released three albums. Benson and Johnny Sangster (who had produced the first Nevada Bachelors album and Songs About Songs) also collaborated on Sangster Meets Benson/Benson Meets Sangster, an album of experimental pop.

When Dear John Letters went on hiatus, Robb Benson continued to record solo albums and launched other projects. Dear John Letters is not active, but did perform in 2009 for Robb's 40th birthday.

== Releases ==
The first Dear John Letters album Rewriting the Wrongs was released in 2001 on the Roam Records label, and was produced by Johnny Sangster. Its music style was described as being influenced by Paul McCartney and Simon & Garfunkel.

A second album Unbroken was released in 2002 also by Roam Records and again produced by Johnny Sangster. The sound was described as more refined than their first recording.

In 2003, the band moved to Foodchain records for their third album Stories of Our Lives. The album was well-received, and reached #34 on the CMJ charts.

== Band members ==
- Robb Benson (lead vocals, guitar) was nominated for the Seattle Weekly Best Seattle Songwriter award three years in a row (2003, 2004, and 2005).
- Richard Davidson (bass) has also performed with The Radio Nationals, The Young Sportsmen, and Mopsey.
- Cassady Laton (drums) has also played with Robb Benson in Dept. of Energy and Stereo Embers.
- Johnny Sangster (lead guitar, keyboards, backing vocals) is also a member of The Tripwires and has produced significant local artists, such as The Posies.
- Michelle Price (lyrics) does not play an instrument, but wrote most of the Dear John Letters lyrics.

== Other projects ==
=== Robb Benson & the Shelk ===
Through the years, Robb Benson has released a number of solo albums in between or during stints with bands. Starting in 2013, Benson began crediting his albums as "Robb Benson & the Shelk" even though he writes, plays, and produces everything on these releases.

=== Dept. of Energy ===
Dept of Energy is a Seattle-area band started by Robb Benson when Dear John Letters went on hiatus. The band includes Robb Benson (vocals, guitar), Ty Bailie (keyboards) formerly of Ego Band USA, and Cassady Laton (drums).

=== The Glass Notes ===
The Glass Notes were Robb Benson (guitar, vocals), Jake Uitti (bass), Perry Morgan (drums), and Tim Dijulio (lead guitar). Uitti writes poetry, which Benson turns into songs.

=== The Great Um ===
The Great Um are Robb Benson (drummer), Caleb Thompson (singer, guitar), and Jake Uitti (bassist).

=== Stereo Embers ===
Stereo Embers were a Seattle-area band with Robb Benson (vocals), Tim Dijulio (lead guitar), Gwon Chang (bass), and Cassady Laton (drums).

=== The Young Sportsmen ===
The Young Sportsmen is a Seattle-area band composed of Richard Davidson (bass, vocals), Wesley Nelson (vocals, guitar, keyboards), Ryan Maxwell (guitar, keyboards, vocals), and Jeff Roeser (percussion). Davidson joined The Young Sportsmen when Dear John Letters went on hiatus.

== Discography ==
=== Dear John Letters ===
LPs

- 2000: Rewriting the Wrongs (Roam Records 4)
- 2002: Unbroken (Roam Records 9)
- 2003: Stories of Our Lives (Foodchain Records 10)

=== Dept. of Energy ===
LPs

- 2007: Held by Waits (Roam Records 16)
- 2009: Faster (Roam Records 17)

EPs

- 2006: EP (Roam Records)

=== Stereo Embers ===
EPs

- 2014: Limited Edition EP (Bandcamp)
- 2015: Code of the Sound (Audio & Video Labs, Inc. / Stereo Embers 5638549086)

Singles

- 2016: Wrong Way/Ways of the World (HockyTalkter Records)

=== Robb Benson ===
LPs

- 2002: De Stella Nova (Roam Records)
- 2004: The Tree Mind (Roam Records)
- 2006: A Collection of Songs I Forgot to Tell You About (Roam Records)

EPs

- 2002: Songs About Songs (Roam Records 3)

=== Rob Benson & the Shelk ===
LPs

- 2013: Cursive Falls From the Sky (self-released)
- 2014: Seen Too Much (self-released)
- 2014: SHELK III (self-released)
- 2015: We made it this far in pretend (self-released)
- 2016: Shelk Island (self-released)
- 2016: Jump the Shelk (self-released)

EPs

- 2014: The 4th Wave Of Wigby (self-released)

=== Robb Benson & Johnny Sangster ===
LPs

- 2002: Sangster Meets Benson/Benson Meets Sangster (Roam Records 5)

=== The Glass Notes ===
- 2010: Dust and Hours (Roam Records)
- 2012: As the Building Crumbles (self-released)

=== The Great Um ===
- 2013: What The People Want (Bandcamp)
- 2014: Everybody Now (Bandcamp)
- 2015: Never Been There (Bandcamp)

=== The Young Sportsmen ===
LPs

- 2007: Death to Palaces (self-released)
- 2008: If You Want It (Unsmashable)

EPs

- 2005: The Familiar Glow of Colliding Particles (Unsmashable)
