= Schoolyard Heroes =

American rock band

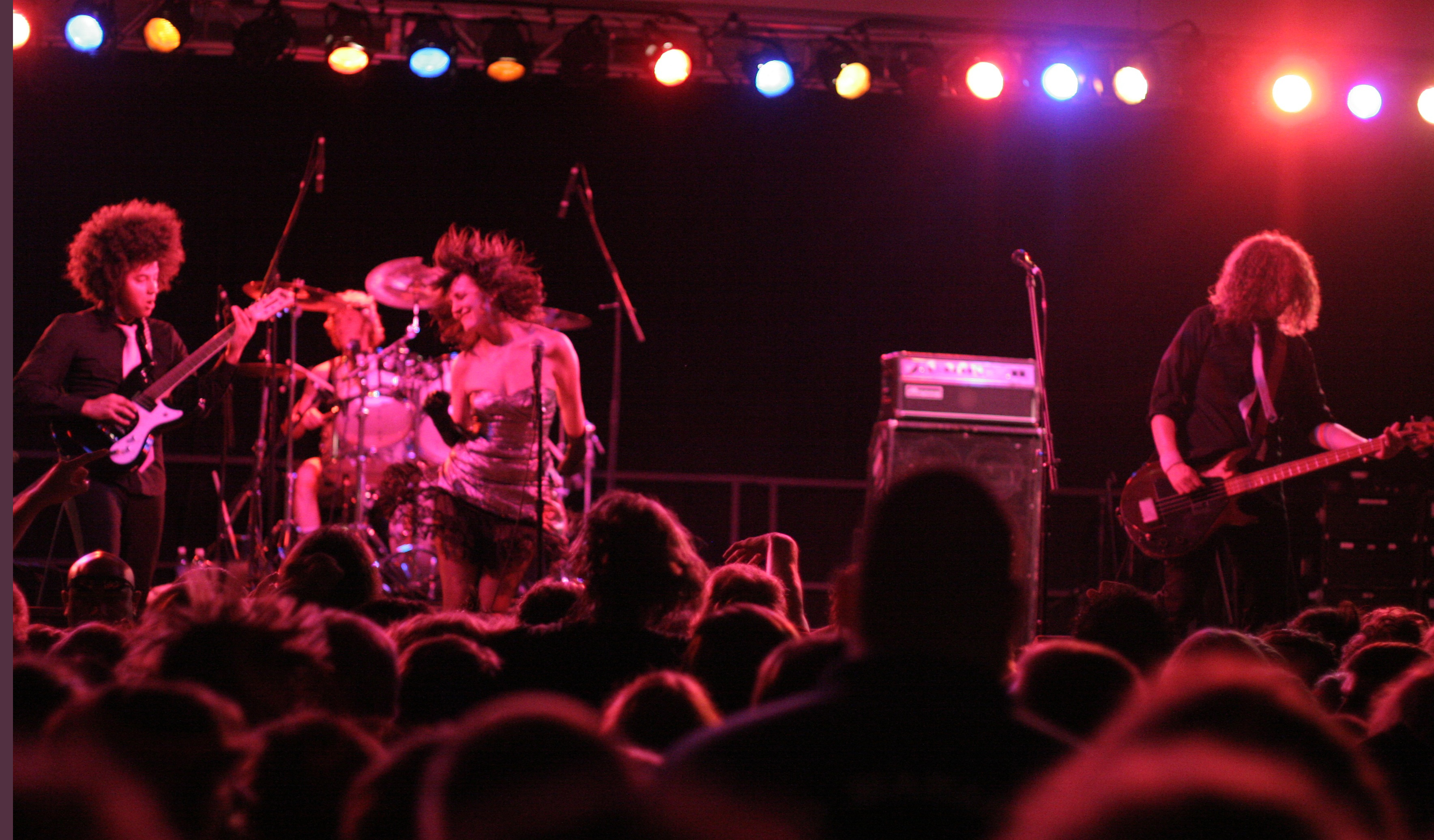
- Schoolyard Heroes in 2007

Background information
- Origin: Tacoma, Washington, U.S.
- Genres: Horror punk; shock rock
- Years active: 1999–2009; 2014
- Label: The Control Group
- Members: Ryann Donnelly; Jonah Bergman; Steve Bonnell; Brian Turner

Schoolyard Heroes was an American rock band from Seattle, Washington, United States, consisting of four members: Ryann Donnelly (lead vocals), Jonah Bergman (bassist, back-up vocals), Steve Bonnell (guitar), and Brian Turner (drummer).

== History ==
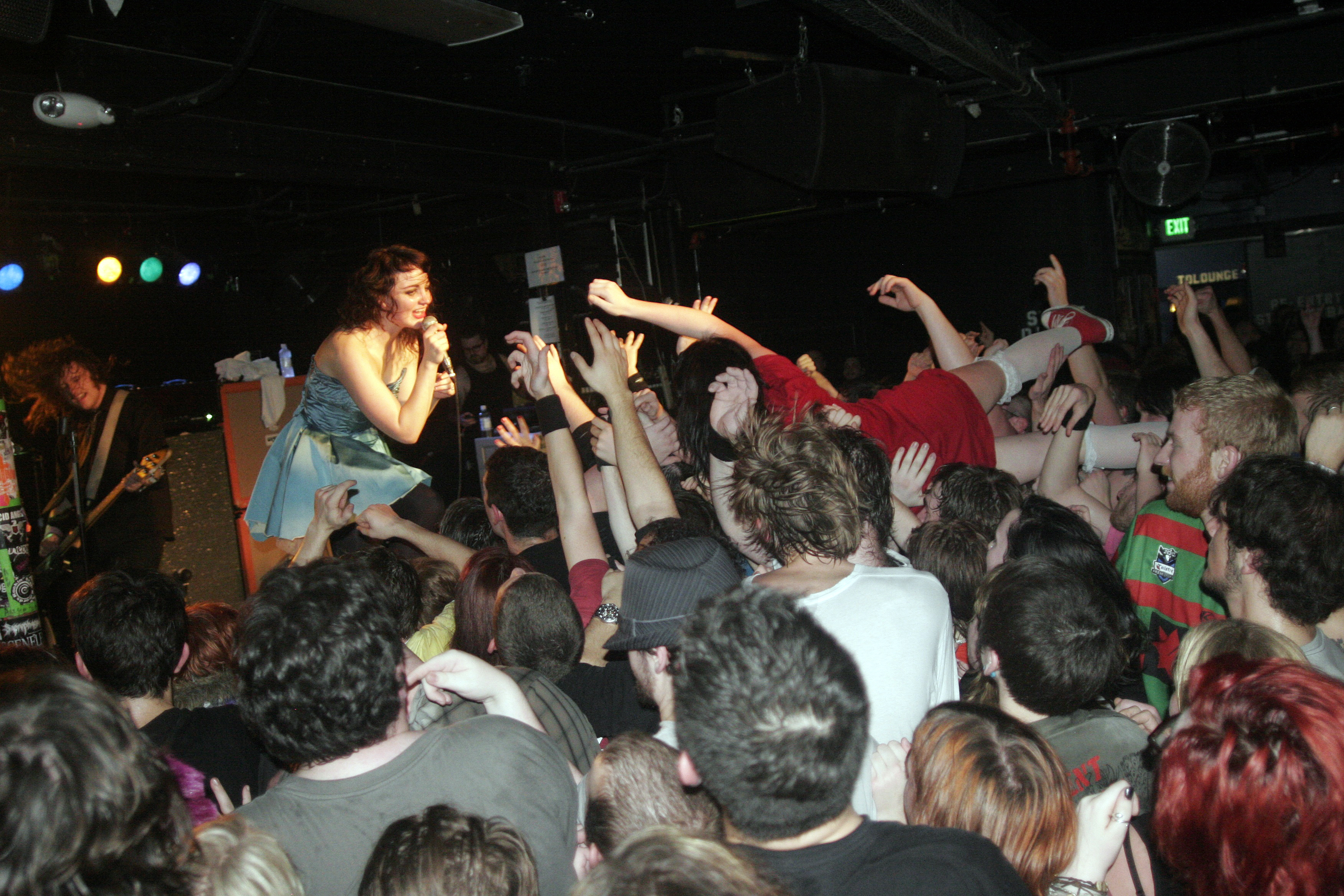
Schoolyard Heroes performs in Seattle at Home for the Horrordays in 2009.

The band originated in Tacoma, Washington where Ryann, Steve, and Jonah attended Charles Wright Academy, a private school in University Place. They first garnered attention in 2003, after winning second place in Experience Music Project's Sound Off! Competition. They continued on to make a debut album, The Funeral Sciences. 2005 saw the release of their second effort, Fantastic Wounds and a nationwide tour with Vendetta Red. They have been featured in the Seattle newspaper The Stranger.

Singer Ryann Donnelly claims that the band has its roots in the year 2000, when she and the band attempted to play a cover of a Misfits song, "Last Caress", but were cut off due to offensive lyricism (they were playing a Christian Battle of the Bands function).

The Heroes entered the studio on January 16, 2007, to record their third full-length record, titled Abominations. Recording wrapped on February 3, 2007, and the album was released on September 18, 2007. The band announced a nationwide tour to showcase their new album.

On March 20, 2007, Schoolyard Heroes debuted a song on their PureVolume music page. "Dude, Where's My Skin?" went on to become the website's most downloaded song of the day. After a short 24-hour stint, the song was removed.

In early 2008, the band completed a nationwide tour, opening for the Seattle-based band Aiden.

The band announced their breakup on November 20, 2009.

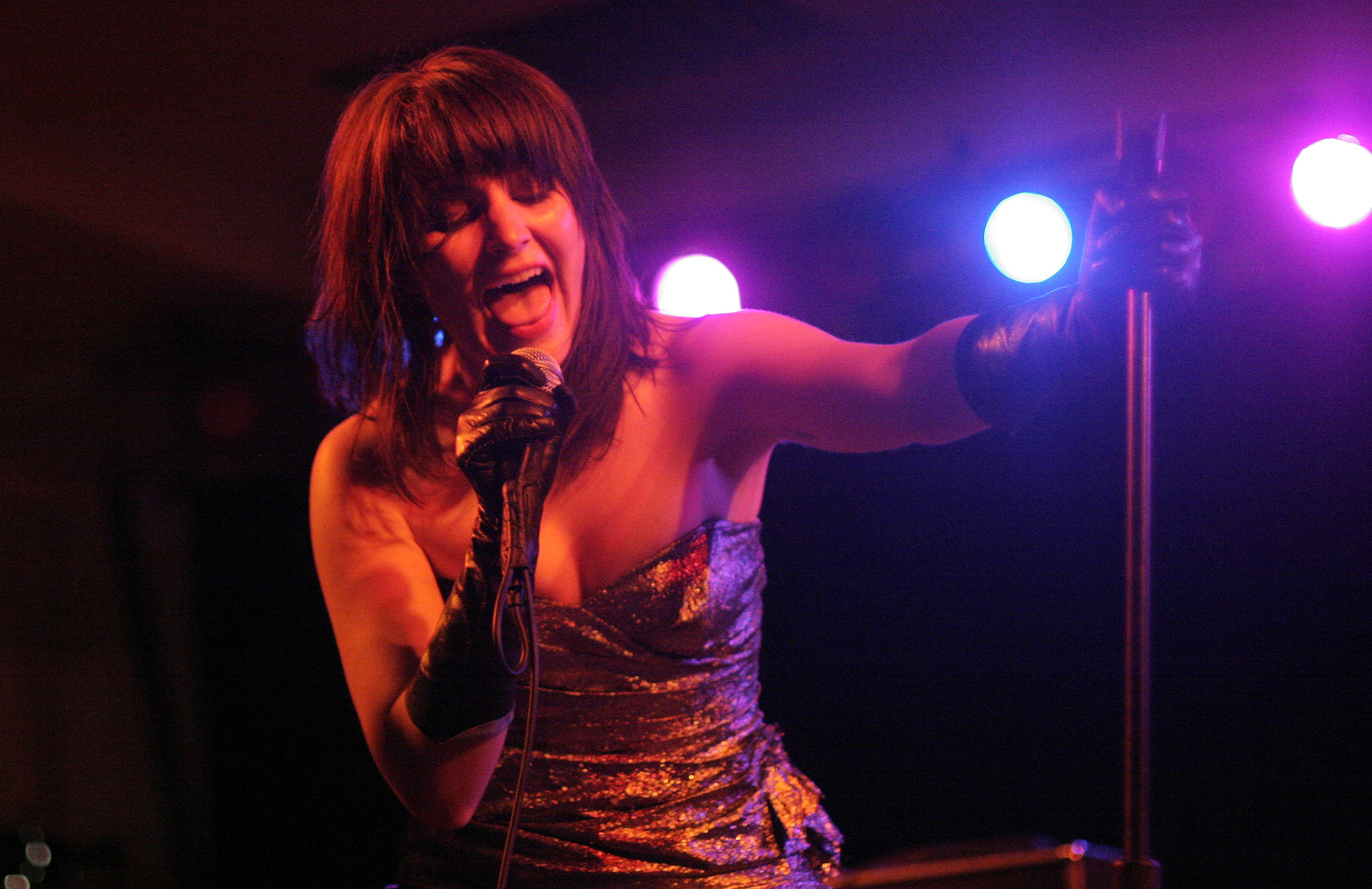
The band Schoolyard Heroes perform Sept. 5, 2007 at Bumbershoot in Seattle.

On December 30, 2009, the band posted an announcement on their Myspace about a "new project" that they called Blood Cells.This is a band featuring both Jonah Bergman and Ryann Donnelly, as well as two new members. Their musical style is similar to that of the Schoolyard Heroes, and they had announced through their email newsletter that they are working on new material, but later said it was an error.

After a handful of Blood Cells shows, Ryann returned to playing dance pop solo shows and moved to New York. She has been releasing new songs through her own label The Lonely Hearts Singles Club.

In 2011, Jonah Bergman joined a resurrected Vendetta Red.

On July 26, 2013, Jonah Bergman released "Tash Life Ep" by Trash Fire, his new band featuring Seattle area musicians such as Mark Gajadhar of The Blood Brothers on guitar.

In 2014, the Schoolyard Heroes reunited for a single show at the annual Bumbershoot music festival.

== Discography ==
- The Funeral Sciences (2003)
- Fantastic Wounds (2005)
- They Live, a two-track single released on vinyl and CD (2005)
- Dude, Where's My Skin?, a two-track single released on vinyl (2007)
- Abominations (2007)
- I Want Your Soul for Christmas, a two-track holiday single (2008)

== Videos ==
- "They Live" (2005) from Fantastic Wounds
- "The Plastic Surgery Hall of Fame" (2007) Directed by: Brian and Brad Palmer (Surround) from Abominations
- "Dude, Where's My Skin?" (2007) Directed by: Brian and Brad Palmer (Surround) from Abominations
