= The Funeral Sciences =

- Schoolyard Heroes' debut album, The Funeral Sciences

Studio album by Schoolyard Heroes
- Released: October 21, 2003
- Length: 37:02
- Label: The Control Group
- Producer: Joe Reineke

Schoolyard Heroes chronology
The Funeral Sciences (2003)	Fantastic Wounds (2005)

The Funeral Sciences is the debut album by Schoolyard Heroes. It was released in 2003 on Control Group/TCG. All songs are written by Schoolyard Heroes.

== Track listing ==
1. "Curse of the Werewolf" – 3:14
2. "All-You-Can-Eat Cancer" – 3:54
3. "The Mechanical Man vs. the Robot From the Outer Limits" – 2:09
4. "Dawn Of The Dead" – 2:45
5. "Blood-Spattered Sundress" – 2:45
6. "Attack of the Puppet People" – 2:49
7. "Bury the Tooth of the Hydra and a Skeleton Army Will Arise" – 3:19
8. "The Klaw" – 2:21
9. "Michael Dudakoff: American Ninja" – 3:32
10. "Contra" – 2:01
11. "Boyfriend" – 2:43
12. "Sincerely Yours, Jonathan Harker" – 5:24
