= From the Word Go =

Studio album by Alien Crime Syndicate
- Released: Jul 18, 2000
- Recorded: 1998 at Grandmaster Studio, Hollywood, California
- Genre: Alternative rock, indie rock, pop punk
- Label: Will Records
- Producer: Gil Norton

Alien Crime Syndicate chronology
Dust to Dirt (2000)	From the Word Go (2000)	XL from Coast to Coast (2002)

Professional ratings
Review scores
Source	Rating
Allmusic	3/5 stars

From the Word Go is the second album by alternative rock group Alien Crime Syndicate released in 2000 through Collective Fruit. Recorded nearly two years before debut Dust to Dirt but released months after and produced by Gil Norton. Originally the album was to be released on Revolution Records, a subsidiary of Giant Records, however after recording had finished, the record label folded and ACS lost the rights to their album. The rights were later bought by Will Records who released the album in July 2000.

== Track listing ==
No.	Title	Length
1.	"Take Me to Your Leader"	3:52
2.	"Land We Made Up"	3:13
3.	"Supergirl"	3:25
4.	"When I Get Home"	3:53
5.	"Outerspace"	3:45
6.	"Always Running"	3:45
7.	"Trippin' up to the Clouds"	3:55
8.	"In a Dream"	3:18
9.	"Atmosphere"	3:50
10.	"Another Time"	3:52
11.	"Everything Around"	4:20
12.	"Earthgirls Are Cool"	4:18
13.	"Revolving"	6:50

== Personnel ==
Alien Crime Syndicate

- Joe Reineke – vocals, guitar
- Jeff Rouse – bass, vocals
- Shawn Trudeau – drums

Production personnel

- Gil Norton – production, mixing
- Ben Hillier – engineering, mixing
- Don Gilmore – mixing on the track "Supergirl"
- Howie Weinberg – mastering
