= Sonic Boom Records =

Sonic Boom Records is an independent record store located in Seattle, Washington. The store was opened by Jason Hughes and Nabil Ayers on September 26, 1997. Between 1997 and 2014, Sonic Boom had expanded to three locations in Seattle (Fremont, Ballard, Capitol Hill) and currently has one location at 2209 NW Market Street in Seattle's Ballard neighborhood.

Over the years, Sonic Boom has hosted free live in-store performances by Death Cab For Cutie, M.I.A., Joanna Newsom, My Morning Jacket, The Shins, Stephen Malkmus and hundreds of other artists from around the world. The store has hosted autograph signings by Sleater-Kinney, Andrew WK and Interpol.

Sonic Boom has been named one of the best record stores in America by Rolling Stone, The Wall Street Journal and SPIN Magazine, and has been profiled by NPR, The New York Times and The Seattle Times.

In July 2016, it was announced that Sonic Boom Records was sold to a longtime customer. Ayers published a memoir about the store that was published in Seattle newspaper, The Stranger.
