= White Knuckled Substance =

Studio album by Vendetta Red
- Released: October 30, 2001
- Recorded: 2000 at Studio Litho & Bob Lang Studio, Seattle WA
- Genre: Emo; post-hardcore; screamo; post-grunge; punk rock
- Length: 34:37
- Label: Loveless Records
- Producer: Matt Bayles; Clay Vomero; Vendetta Red

Vendetta Red chronology
Blackout Analysis (2000)	White Knuckled Substance (2001)	Cut Your Noose EP (2002)

Professional ratings
Review scores
Source	Rating
AllMusic	2.5/5 stars
The Encyclopedia of Popular Music	4/5 stars

White Knuckled Substance is the second album by Vendetta Red. It was released on October 30, 2001.

== Critical reception ==
CMJ New Music Monthly wrote that the band "has managed to craft some unforgettably upbeat moments that elevate their emo-punk sound towards uninhibited sing-alongs."

== Track listing ==
1. "Caught You Like A Cold" - 2:36
2. "Suicide Party" - 3:05
3. "Ribcage Menagerie" - 2:07
4. "Shatterday" - 2:39
5. "Accident Sex" - 3:12
6. "The Long Goodbye" - 4:11
7. "Stay Home" - 3:02
8. "Seconds Away" - 3:32
9. "All Cried Out" - 1:59
10. "Forgetiquette" - 2:36
11. "Por Vida" - 2:35
12. "Ambulance Chaser" - 3:03
