= Tablet =

Tablet may refer to:

== Medicine ==
- Tablet (pharmacy), a solid unit dosage form of medication, colloquially called a "pill"

== Computing ==
- Tablet computer, a mobile computer that is larger than a smartphone, primarily operated by touching the screen
- Graphics tablet or digitizing tablet, a computer input device for capturing hand-drawn images and graphics
- Tablet, a section of columns in a range of rows in Google's Bigtable NoSQL database

== Confectionery ==
- Tablet (confectionery), a medium-hard, sugary confection from Scotland
- Tableting, a confectionery manufacturing process
- A type of chocolate bar
- Energy tablets

== Inscription, printing, and writing media ==
- Clay tablet, one of the earliest known writing mediums
- Wax tablet, used by scribes as far back as ancient Greece
- Notebook of blank, graph or lined paper, usually bound with glue or staples along one edge
- Stele, slab of stone or wood erected as a monument or marker
- Tabula ansata, tablets with handles
- Vindolanda tablets, Roman era writings found in Britain

== Periodicals and printed works ==
- Tablet (magazine), a daily online magazine of Jewish news, ideas, and culture
- Tablet (newspaper), a newspaper published in Seattle, Washington
- Tablet (religious), a traditional term used for certain religious texts
- The Tablet, a Catholic magazine published in the United Kingdom
- The Tablet (Brooklyn), a Catholic newspaper published in the United States
- The New Zealand Tablet, a former weekly Catholic newspaper

== Other uses ==
- Tabula rasa, the theory originating with Aristotle of the newborn mind as an uninscribed tablet or blank slate
- Tablet is a form of token (railway signalling)
- Tyer's Electric Train Tablet, a system of controlling access to single-track railway lines in Britain
- "Tablett", tray, a shallow platform designed for carrying things, in German

== See also ==
- Plaque (disambiguation)
