= Tablet (newspaper) =

Tablet was a bi-weekly alternative newspaper in Seattle, Washington published from 2000 to 2005. Tablet's focus was on the music, arts, politics and culture of the Pacific Northwest.

== History ==
Cover of Tablet #103

Founded by co-op of writers and publishers, its first issue came out on October 1, 2000. The paper began as a bi-weekly newspaper with a print run of 20,000. It was distributed for free at rock clubs, record stores, galleries and similar businesses, as well as to newsstands and newspaper boxes. Distribution included the Northwest cities of Seattle, Portland, Spokane, Bellingham, Tacoma, Bellevue, Vancouver and Olympia. Its main rivals were the Seattle Weekly and The Stranger. In the Utne Reader's 2001 Alternative Press Awards, Tablet won the Reader's Choice award for "Best New Title." Guest writers for Tablet included Margaret Cho and Public Enemy's Chuck D.

In March 2004, the paper's owners De Kwok, Eric Hildebrandt, Dan Halligan and Sarah Sherman, relaunched the paper as a monthly glossy covered magazine. The magazine was higher profile than the newspaper and included more fashion and music coverage. Tablet worked extensively with the Rat City Rollergirls, Bumbershoot, the Seattle Erotic Art Festival, Vain, Three Imaginary Girls, the Seattle Gay and Lesbian Film Festival, KEXP, Seattle Art Museum, Henry Art Museum, Seattle International Film Festival, Seattle Public Libraries, Roq La Rue, Richard Hugo House, Grand Illusion Cinema, I Heart Rummage, Home Alive, the Independent Media Center and most of Seattle's alternative music venues. Tablet folded in September 2005 after its 103rd issue.
