= Muzzle (band) =

Muzzle is an alternative rock band formed in 1994 by Ryan Maxwell, Wesley Nelson, Burke Thomas, and Greg Collinsworth. They have released two albums with Reprise Records: Betty Pickup in 1996 and Actual Size in 1999.

The band split up after the release of Actual Size due to differences with their management team. Maxwell and Nelson went on to form the band Young Sportsmen and had relative local success with the release of an Ep entitled The Familiar Glow of Colliding Particles. Thomas formed the band Pris and later joined Vendetta Red on drums. Collinsworth started the band The Band That Made Milwaukee Famous which later became The Small Change.

Betty Pickup – track listing

1. "Not a Sing Along"
2. "What a Bore"
3. "Free Trampoline"
4. "Shatterproof"
5. "Bleed On"
6. "Glug"
7. "Beautiful Truth"
8. "Come on Down"
9. "Say Windows"
10. "Flying Lesson"
11. "Goner"

Actual Size – track listing

1. "Complicated"
2. "Ditch Your Love"
3. "Been Hurt"
4. "Obvious"
5. "Know"
6. "Sailor Song"
7. "Second Time Around"
8. "Broken Tooth"
9. "Dynamic"
10. "(A Song For) Super Clones of the Future"
11. "Drop The Needle"
12. "Thanks to You"
