= Muzzle law =

Muzzle law may refer to:

- Maulkuerfgesetz, a proposed law in Luxembourg in 1937
- Polish judicial disciplinary panel law, 2019 Polish law
