= Alan Michael Braufman =

American composer and musician

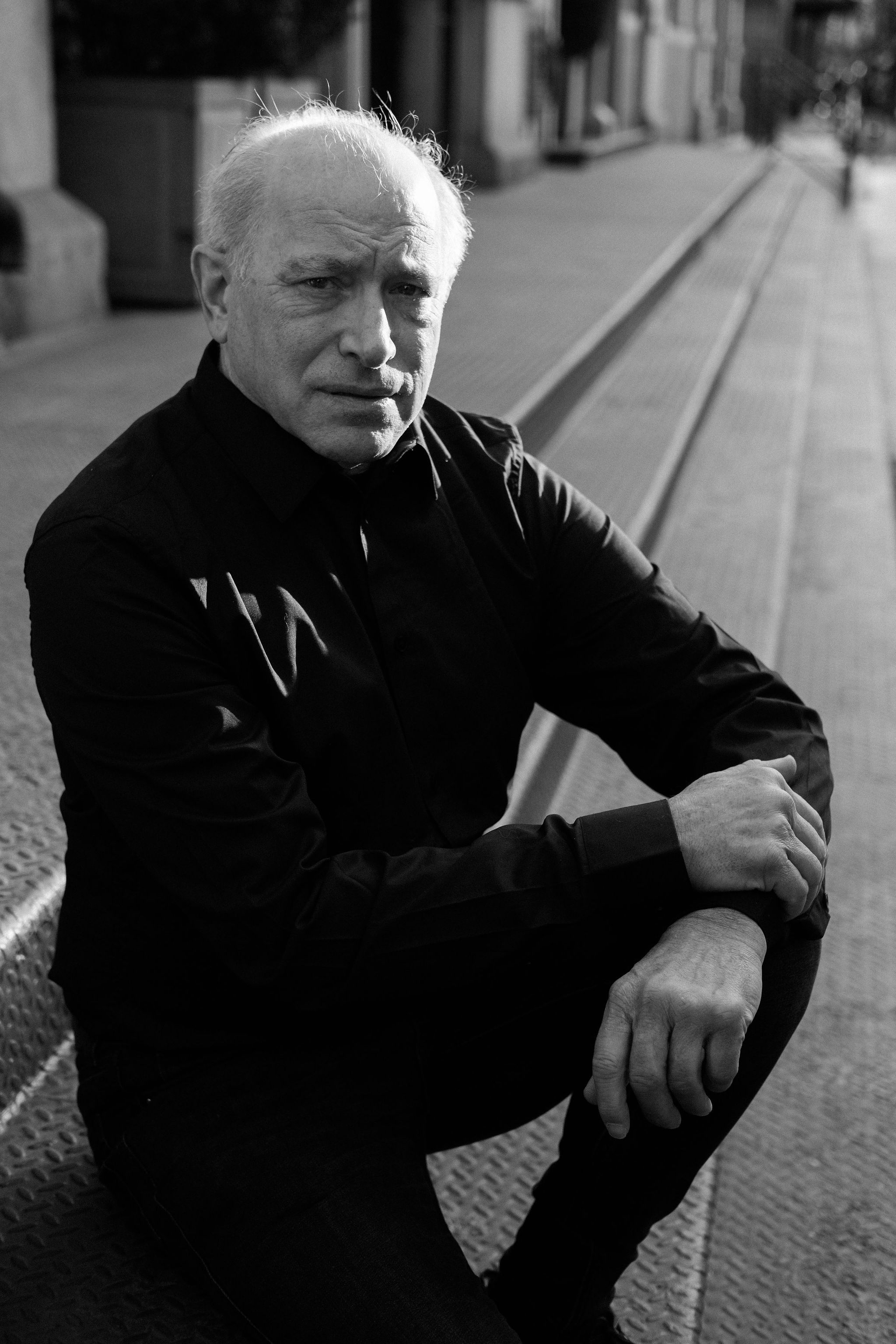
- Alan Michael Braufman

Background information
- Born: Alan Michael Braufman; May 22, 1951 (age 75); Brooklyn, New York, United States
- Genres: Jazz
- Occupations: Musician; composer
- Instruments: Saxophone; flute
- Labels: India Navigation; Passport Jazz; Valley of Search
- Website: www.alanbraufman.com

Alan Michael Braufman (performing as Alan Braufman and Alan Michael); born May 22, 1951, in Brooklyn, New York, United States), is an American jazz saxophonist, flutist and composer.

== Early career ==
Braufman graduated from Boston's Berklee College of Music where he met Cooper-Moore (then Gene Ashton) and other musicians, including David S. Ware, Chris Amberger, and Marc Edwards, with whom he moved to New York City in 1973 and (minus Edwards) occupied a vacant building at 501 Canal Street in lower Manhattan. The building, where the total rent came to $140 for four floors, became a hub for musicians to practice and perform and its occupants played a seminal role in New York City's early-seventies loft jazz scene. In 1974, Village Voice jazz critic Gary Giddins wrote a review of Braufman's performance called "Taking Chances At 501 Canal," stating “The fact is, these are the musicians who are taking the chances today and their gifts and commitment ought to be attended.”

In 1975, Braufman's debut album Valley of Search was released on the India Navigation record label. The album was recorded live in the performance space at 501 Canal Street by Bob Cummins, the owner of India Navigation and was the label's second release. Cooper-Moore (who made his recorded debut on the album), Cecil McBee, David Lee and Ralph Williams performed as Braufman's band.

== Archival Releases ==
On June 29, 2018, a remastered version of Valley of Search was reissued on vinyl and digital formats. The reissue is a project of Braufman and his nephew, Nabil Ayers. To celebrate the reissue, Braufman performed music from Valley of Search in a string of New York shows in August 2018. Valley of Search was reissued on CD in 2021.

In 2019, master tapes were unearthed of a recording with Alan Braufman and Cooper-Moore performing as a duo live on Columbia University's radio station, WKCR on May 22, 1972, just two years before Valley of Search was recorded. In September 2019, Live at WKCR May 22, 1972 was released on digital platforms, followed by a limited-edition vinyl pressing, and as bonus material on the Valley of Search CD reissue.

In January, 2022, Braufman announced Live in New York City, February 8, 1975. The 94-minute live album features William Parker, Cooper-Moore, Ralph Williams, Jim Schapperoew, John Clark, and new liner notes from the host, Susan Mannheimer. The album will be released on triple LP, double CD, and digital formats.

== The Fire Still Burns and Infinite Love Infinite Tears ==
In September 2019, Alan Braufman and Cooper-Moore performed at the Basilica Soundscape Festival in Hudson, NY, and announced plans to record a new album together with a full band. The new album, The Fire Still Burns was released on August 28, 2020, on the Valley of Search label. The Fire Still Burns includes Cooper-Moore on piano, James Brandon Lewis on tenor saxophone, Ken Filiano on bass, Andrew Drury on drums and Michael Wimberly on percussion. The album was recorded at The National's Long Pond Studio in upstate New York. The release received worldwide acclaim from Pitchfork, The WIRE, DownBeat, Rolling Stone, who said "In 2020, we need the meditative focus and impassioned intensity of an artist like Alan Braufman more than ever," and BBC DJ Gilles Peterson, who called Braufman, "A legend in free music."

In January 2021, The Chicago composer and clarinetist Angel Bat Dawid remixed the song "Sunrise," which The New York Times described as "another indication of what it means to stay engaged decades on, bringing the tradition ahead."

In March, 2024, Braufman announced the new album, Infinite Love Infinite Tears , for May 17, 2024 release. The album features Patricia Brennan on vibes, James Brandon Lewis on tenor saxophone, Ken Filiano on bass, Chad Taylor on drums, and Michael Wimberly on percussion. Like 2020's "The Fire Still Burns," the album was produced by Braufman's nephew, Nabil Ayers, and released by Ayers' label, Valley of Search. Downbeat Magazine said in a 4-star review, “Like his free jazz predecessors, Coltrane, Cherry and Coleman, Braufman finds spirituality in every note.” London's MOJO magazine said, “Braufman’s spiraling, uplifting compositions occupy an evolving space where jazz’s past and future collide.” NPR called the song "Brooklyn", "playfully light yet texturally dense."

== Alan Michael ==
In the 1970s and 1980s, Braufman spent his time touring as a saxophonist with Carla Bley, The Psychedelic Furs and Philip Glass. Braufman later dropped his last name and began to record and perform as Alan Michael.

In 1988, he released the album Lost In Asia on the Passport Jazz label. The album included performances by Bill Frisell and Sid McGinnis as well as a cover of the Psychedelic Furs song "Sister Europe. In 1995, he released the album As Daylight Fades, on which Omar Hakim played drums.

== Personal life ==
He currently lives in Salt Lake City, UT where he performs regularly, and is now a teacher of many students learning to play the saxophone. In 2016, the Alan Michael Band was nominated for Best Jazz Artist by the Salt Lake City Weekly.

== Discography ==
Title	Release date	Notes	Label
Valley of Search	1975, Reissued June 29, 2018	as Alan Braufman	India Navigation, Valley of Search
Lost in Asia	1988	as Alan Michael	Passport Jazz
As Daylight Fades	1995	as Alan Michael	Collective Fruit
Live at WKCR, May 22, 1972	2019	as Alan Braufman & Cooper-Moore	Valley of Search
The Fire Still Burns	August 28, 2020	as Alan Braufman	Valley of Search
Live in New York City, February 8, 1975	April 8, 2022	as Alan Braufman	Valley of Search
Infinite Love Infinite Tears	May 17, 2024	as Alan Braufman	Valley of Search
