= Sirens Sister =

American rock band

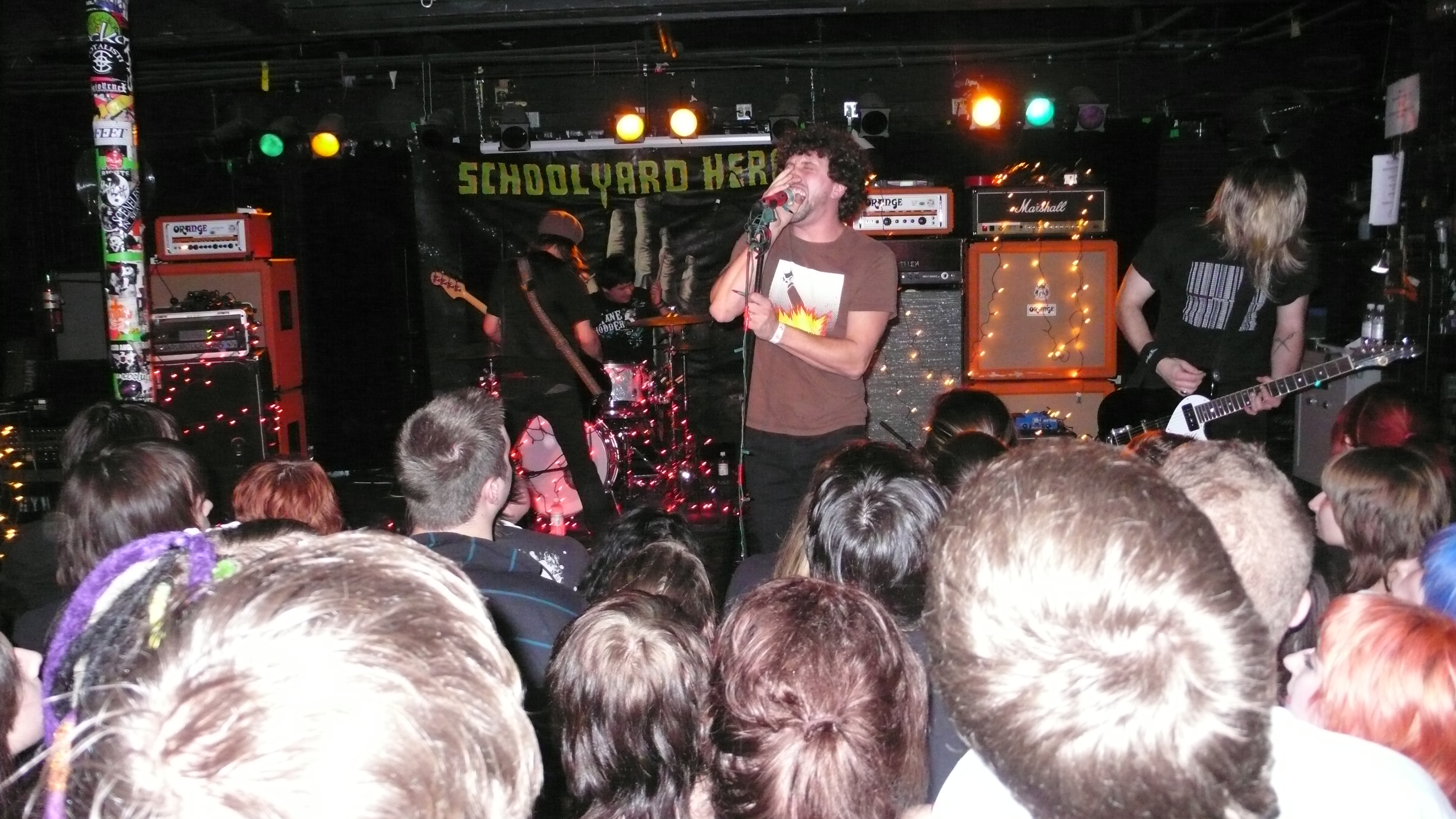
- Sirens Sister in 2009

Background information
- Origin: Seattle, Washington, U.S.
- Genre: Alternative rock
- Years active: 2006–present
- Label: The Control Group
- Members: Zach Davidson; Leif Andersen; Levi Andersen; Chris Bridges; Ben Libey
- Past members: Todd Janes; Jason Bohl; Joel McNayer; Jeff Rouse

Sirens Sister is an American rock band based in Seattle, Washington. The group was formed in 2006, following the breakup of Vendetta Red, former members Zach Davidson, Leif Andersen and Rouse, as well as local drummer Ben Libay, formed Sirens Sister, initially in Bakersfield, California before relocating to Seattle.

Influenced by the likes of U2, Simple Minds, Duran Duran and Echo & the Bunnymen the group signed with The Control Group and recorded their debut album, Echoes from the Ocean Floor, released the same year, with producer Martin Feveyear and garnered some positive reviews. In 2007 Rouse left the group and was replaced by Andersen's brother, Levi Andersen, on bass. Their second album, Unspeakable Things, was released in August 2009.

== Discography ==
=== Echoes from the Ocean Floor (2006) ===
1. "Kissing Her"
2. "Womb Dreams from the Ether"
3. "Hold On"
4. "Should've Known"
5. "So Long"
6. "Closer & Closer"
7. "Echoes"
8. "Hideaway"
9. "You're So Cruel"
10. "Emerald Eyes"
11. "Faultline"
12. "They're After Us"

=== Unspeakable Things (2009) ===
1. "The Thing tn the Woods"
2. "Unspeakable Things"
3. "Immaterial Girl"
4. "The Sea of Claws"
5. "Into the Ether"
6. "Sparks"
7. "Scarlet Hearts"
8. "Eyes Catch Fire"
9. "Never Let Go"
10. "The Cloak of Shadows"
11. "In My Bones Where Winter Never Sleeps"
