= Three Imaginary Girls =

Music website

Three Imaginary Girls is a Seattle-based website that showcases the music of the Pacific Northwest. Self-described as "Seattle's sparkly indie-pop press", since its founding in 2002, the site has featured hundreds of reviews of albums, live music, film, theater, interviews, political commentary, and even love advice (from Visqueen's Rachel Flotard), in Seattle and beyond.

The girls also book music showcases, contribute to other music publications (including The Stranger, Tablet Magazine, and Music for America), and make guest radio appearances on KEXP. The girls were voted "MVP of Seattle Music 2004" by readers of the Seattle Weekly, and were listed in Seattle Magazine's Most Influential People issue.

The girls have become part of the fabric of the Seattle indie-rock scene, cross-pollinating and promoting such bands as Daylight Basement, Math and Physics Club, Tennis Pro, Visqueen, and Slender Means.

With a name similar to The Cure's debut album Three Imaginary Boys the girls may have been making reference or paying homage to the British band.
