= Sisters of the Red Death =

Studio album by Vendetta Red
- Released: August 30, 2005
- Recorded: 2004
- Genre: Emo; post-hardcore; screamo; post-grunge
- Length: 47:22
- Label: Epic
- Producer: Howard Benson

Vendetta Red chronology
Between the Never and the Now (2003)	Sisters of the Red Death (2005)	Scripture (2013)

Singles from Sisters of the Red Death
- 1. "Silhouette Serenade" Released: 2005

Professional ratings
Review scores
Source	Rating
AbsolutePunk	89%
AllMusic	3/5 stars
Alternative Press	5/5 stars
Ultimate Guitar	7.3/10

Sisters of the Red Death is an album by Vendetta Red, released in 2005. It was the band's second album for Epic Records.

== Production ==
Sisters of the Red Death is a concept album about nuclear war. It was produced by Howard Benson.

The track listing is slightly different depending on the format of the album.

== Critical reception ==
Alternative Press called the album "packed with a dozen fist-pumping anthems, each sounding as massive as any arena-rock staple from 15 years prior."

== Track listing ==
1. "Vendetta Red Cried Rape On Their Date With Destiny" - 3:37
2. "The Body and the Blood" - 3:47
3. "A Dark Heart Silhouette" - 3:58
4. "Shiver" - 4:03
5. "In Lieu of Dead Brides" - 3:53
6. "Silhouette Serenade" - 3:21
7. "The Banshee Ballet" - 2:42
8. "The Great Castration" - 4:34
9. "Gloria" - 3:50
10. "Run" - 4:11
11. "Coital Improv" - 3:25
12. "A Joyless Euphoria" - 6:08
13. "Depressionesque" - Hidden song

The unlisted song "Shoot Up With God" appears at the end of the CD version of the album.
