= The Control Group =

American independent record label

- Company type: Public
- Industry: record label
- Founded: 2002; Seattle, Washington
- Founder: Nabil Ayers
- Headquarters: United States
- Number of locations: Brooklyn, NY

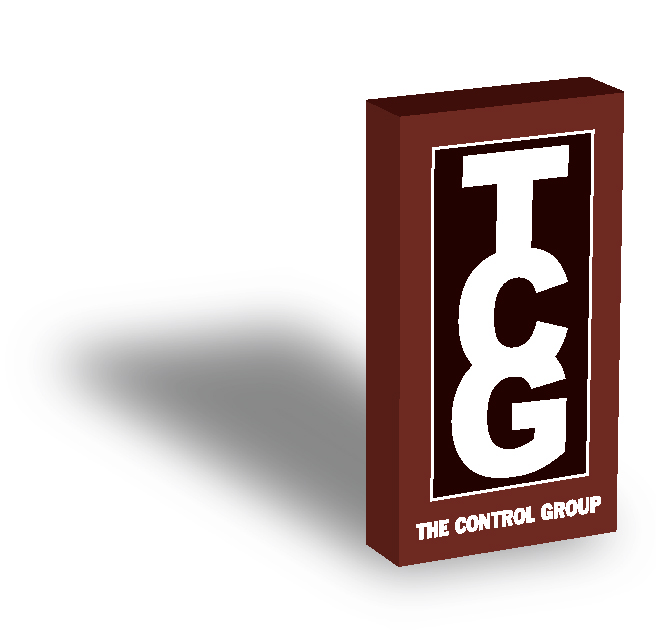

The Control Group is an independent record label, founded by Nabil Ayers in Seattle, Washington in 2002. Notable artists who have released albums on The Control Group include El Perro del Mar, Lykke Li, Cate Le Bon, Alice Boman and Wildbirds & Peacedrums. The Control Group is also known for vinyl releases and reissues by Spinal Tap, Grandaddy, The Killers, Kings Of Leon, Giorgio Moroder and PJ Harvey.

The Control Group relocated from Seattle to Brooklyn, NY in 2008. In 2018, Ayers founded the independent record label Valley of Search to reissue his uncle Alan Braufman's album of the same name. The label has gone on to release music by Tomas Nordmark and Patricia Brennan.

== Roster ==
- Alice Boman
- Enemy (band)
- Alexander von Mehren
- El Perro del Mar
- Figurines
- The Fitness
- Grandaddy
- PJ Harvey
- I Was A King
- The Killers
- Kings of Leon
- Cate Le Bon
- Lykke Li
- The Long Winters
- Giorgio Moroder
- Nouela
- Schoolyard Heroes
- Wildbirds & Peacedrums
- Spinal Tap
- Zhala
- The Lonely H

== See also ==
- List of record labels
