= Nabil Ayers =

American drummer

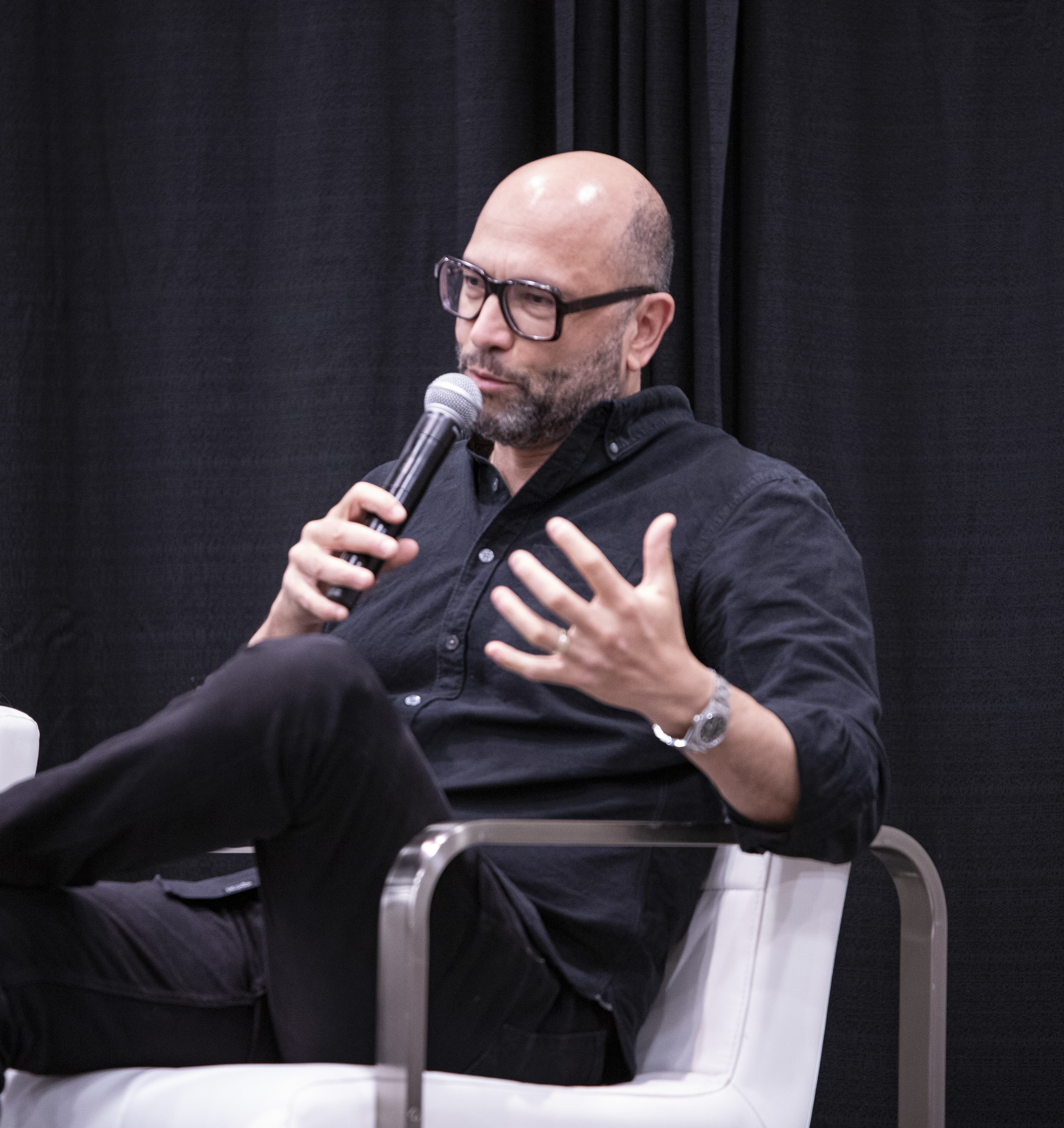
- Ayers at SXSW 2025

Background information
- Occupations: Entrepreneur, author, musician
- Instrument: Drums
- Labels: Beggars Group, 4AD, The Control Group, V2, Mercury, Barsuk
- Website: www.nabilayers.com

Nabil Ayers is an American music industry entrepreneur, author, musician and podcast host.

Ayers' debut memoir, My Life in the Sunshine, was published by Viking Press on June 7, 2022. The book focuses on Ayers' relationship with his father, the jazz musician Roy Ayers, growing up as a mixed-race person in America, and Ayers' life in the music industry. The title, My Life in the Sunshine, is a reference to the Roy Ayers song, "Everybody Loves the Sunshine." In a June 4, 2022 CBS Saturday Morning segment, Ayers, when asked about how the memoir portrays his father, stated, "In the end, it's positive. It's about all the great things he's given me, even though he hasn't been part of my life."

As a writer, Ayers has contributed to The New York Times, NPR, Pitchfork, Rolling Stone, People, GQ, Huffington Post, and The Root. His writing is often autobiographical, and touches on topics of music and race.

In June 2024, Ayers launched a podcast called Identified, which focuses on family and identity. Some of the musicians, authors, comedians, and actors Ayers has interviewed on Identified include Dawn Richard, Hrishikesh Hirway, Ione Skye, Geoff Rickly, Reggie Watts, and Nate Mendel. In the podcast trailer, Ayers states his reason for starting the podcast toward the end of his eighteen-month-long book tour: "I felt a persistent desire to continue exploring stories of family, shifting the focus from my own experiences to those of others. On "Identified, we'll engage with authors, musicians, and people from a diversity of backgrounds to unravel what family means to them."

Ayers is the current U.S. President of the UK-based Beggars Group of record labels, assuming the role in early 2022 after his work for 4AD where he had served as the label's U.S. General Manager since 2009. While with 4AD, he led album campaigns for Grimes, Big Thief, St. Vincent, Purity Ring, Deerhunter, Tune-Yards, Future Islands, The Breeders, and The National, whose album Sleep Well Beast won the 2018 Grammy Award for Best Alternative Music Album. Ayers served on the Recording Academy's Board of Trustees from 2022-2024, and previously served as a two-term elected Governor. Ayers was named one of Billboard Magazine's Indie Power Players from 2019-2024.

Ayers co-founded Seattle’s Sonic Boom Records store with his business partner Jason Hughes in 1997. Sonic Boom was named one of the best record stores in America by Rolling Stone, The Wall Street Journal and SPIN Magazine, and has been profiled by NPR, The New York Times and The Seattle Times. In July 2016, Sonic Boom Records was sold to a longtime customer. After the sale, Ayers wrote a memoir about the store that was published in The Stranger.

In 2002, Ayers founded the independent record label The Control Group which has released music by Lykke Li, Cate Le Bon, and El Perro del Mar. In 2018, Ayers founded the independent record label Valley of Search to reissue his uncle Alan Braufman's album of the same name. The label has gone on to release music by Tomas Nordmark and Patricia Brennan. As a drummer, he has performed with various acts including The Long Winters and Tommy Stinson.

As of 2016, he resides in Brooklyn, New York.
