= Loaded discography =

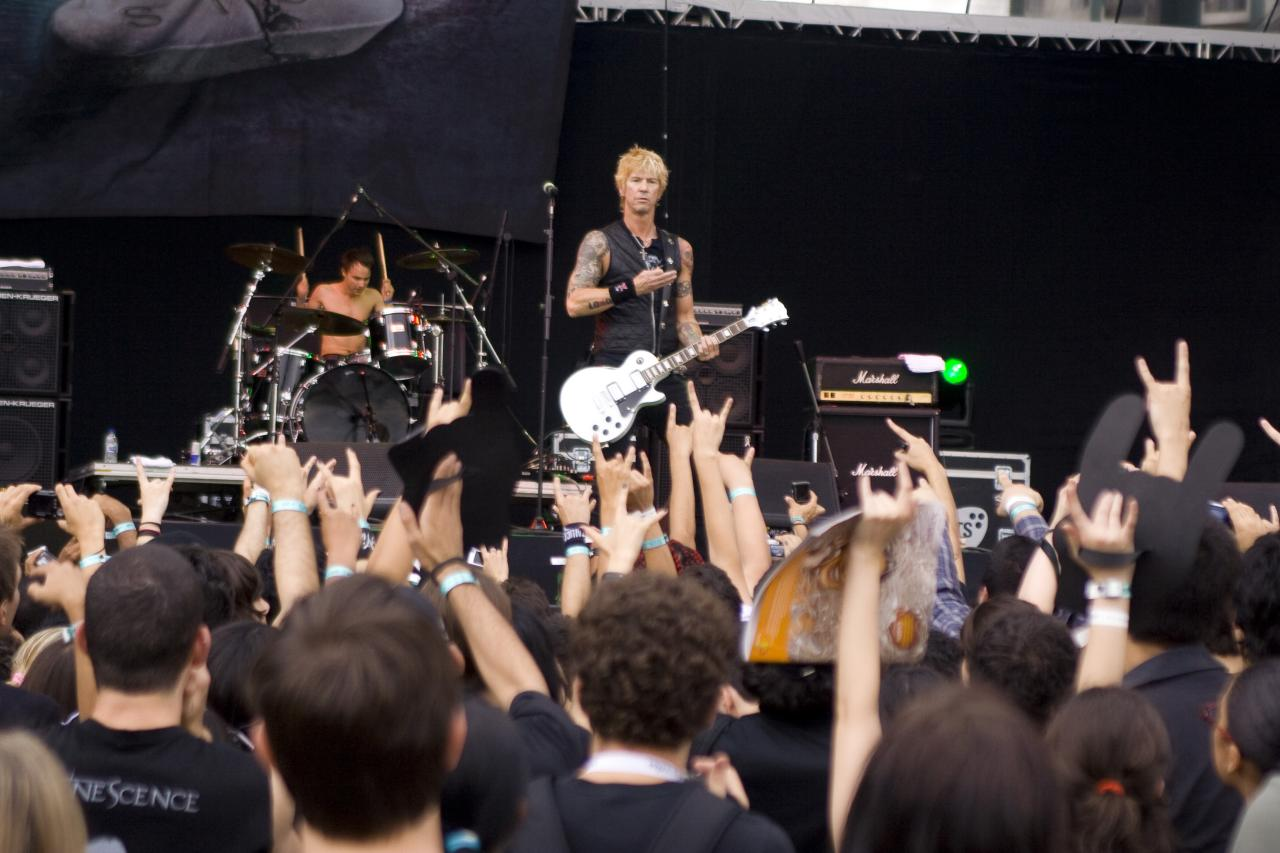
- Studio albums: 3
- Extended plays: 1
- Live albums: 1
- Singles: 4
- Music videos: 4

Loaded (also known as Duff McKagan's Loaded) is an American hard rock band from Seattle, Washington, formed in 1999. Since 2001, the band's line-up has included vocalist and rhythm guitarist Duff McKagan (Guns N' Roses and formerly of Velvet Revolver), lead guitarist Mike Squires (formerly of Nevada Bachelors and Alien Crime Syndicate) and bassist Jeff Rouse (formerly of Alien Crime Syndicate, Sirens Sister and Vendetta Red). Since 2009, Isaac Carpenter (formerly of Loudermilk, Gosling and The Exies) has been the band's drummer replacing Geoff Reading (formerly of New American Shame and Green Apple Quick Step). The band has released 3 studio albums, 1 live album, 1 extended play, 4 singles and 4 music videos.

== Albums ==
=== Studio albums ===
Year	Album details	Peak chart positions	
Year	Album details	US	US Heat
2001	Dark Days: Released: July, 2001; Label: Self-released, Toshiba EMI, Locomotive; Formats: CD, LP	—	—
2009	Sick: Released: March 20, 2009; Label: Century Media; Formats: CD, CD/DVD, digital download, LP	—	43
2011	The Taking: Released: April 19, 2011; Label: Eagle Rock Entertainment; Formats: CD, digital download	—	12
"—" denotes releases that did not chart.

=== Live albums ===
Year	Album details
1999	Episode 1999: Live: Released: 1999; Label: Self-released; Formats: CD

== Extended plays ==
Year	Album details
2008	Wasted Heart: Released: September 22, 2008; Label: Century Media; Formats: CD, LP

== Singles ==
Year	Single	Album
2008	"Greed" / "I'm the Blues"^{[A]} (with The Loyalties)	Non-album single
2009	"Flatline"	Sick
2010	"We Win"	The Taking
2010	"Fight On"	Non-album single

- A "Greed" (Duff McKagan's Loaded) / "I's the Blues" (The Loyalties) is a split 7" vinyl single released with the band The Loyalties containing previously unreleased songs from each band and limited to 666 copies.

== Other appearances ==
List of non-single songs by Loaded from non-Loaded releases, showing year released and album name
Title	Year	Album
"Got Me Under Pressure"	2011	ZZ Top: A Tribute from Friends

== Music videos ==
Year	Title	Director(s)	Album
2002	"Seattlehead"	?	Dark Days
2008	"No More"	?	Sick
2009	"Flatline"	?	Sick
2011	"Dead Skin"	Jamie Burton Chamberlin	The Taking
