= The Gentlemen (Seattle band) =

American rock band

- Origin: Seattle, Washington, U.S.
- Genres: Acoustic, pop, rock
- Years active: 1998–1999, 2000–2001
- Past members: Duff McKagan; Michael Barragan; Taz Bentley; Dez Cadena; Dave Dederer; Jason Finn

The Gentlemen was an American rock band from Seattle, Washington, formed in 1998. Formed by Duff McKagan, formerly of Guns N' Roses, the band's first lineup consisted of guitarists Michael Barragan, formerly of Plexi, and Dez Cadena, formerly of Black Flag, as well as drummer Taz Bentley, formerly of The Reverend Horton Heat. The same year, they adopted the Loaded moniker before disbanding.

McKagan reformed the band with Dave Dederer and Jason Finn, both of The Presidents of the United States of America. However, McKagan also reformed Loaded, with Dederer becoming the band's bassist, and by 2001, The Gentlemen disbanded.

== History ==
=== Formation and first lineup (1997–1999) ===
After leaving Guns N' Roses in 1997, Duff McKagan moved back to Seattle, Washington. He reformed previous group 10 Minute Warning, releasing one self-titled album, before recording his second studio album entitled Beautiful Disease in 1998. McKagan formed The Gentlemen, to be his band on the album's supporting tour, with guitarists Michael Barragan, formerly of Plexi, and Dez Cadena, formerly of Black Flag, as well as drummer Taz Bentley, formerly of The Reverend Horton Heat,

Following the merger between Geffen and Interscope Records, he was dropped from the label with his album shelved. The Gentlemen continued to tour, playing in the US. However, by 1999, they adopted the name Loaded, releasing the live album Episode 1999: Live and disbanding the same year.

=== Reformation and disbanding (2000–2001) ===
McKagan reformed The Gentlemen, in 2000, with Dave Dederer and, initially, Jason Finn, both then former of The Presidents of the United States of America. The lineup would soon only consist of McKagan, on electric guitar, and Dederer, on acoustic guitar, with the duo performing live shows in suits. They made their official live debut at the Orange showcase, before playing shows locally, including NXNW, performing original songs, as well as covers, with their music described as "straightforward, goofy pop songs." They also played at the SXSW with hopes of getting a record deal. Although they did not record any songs, an album was expected to be released in future.

The same year, The Presidents of the United States of America reunited, while McKagan also began working on a new project that later became the second lineup of Loaded. McKagan performed with The Presidents on The Late Late Show while Dederer contributed to the Loaded album Dark Days before joining the band briefly as bassist. By 2001, The Gentlemen disbanded.

== Band members ==
- Duff McKagan – vocals, bass, guitar (1998–1999, 2000–2001)
- Michael Barragan – guitar (1999)
- Taz Bentley – drums (1999)
- Dez Cadena – guitar (1999)
- Dave Dederer – acoustic guitar (2000–2001)
- Jason Finn – drums (2000)
