= Velvet Chains (band) =

American hard rock band

- Velvet Chains in 2025. Left to right: Nils Goldschmidt, Philip Paulsen, Chaz Terra, Jason Hope, Von Boldt.

Background information
- Origin: Las Vegas, Nevada, U.S.
- Genres: Hard rock Alternative rock
- Years active: 2018–present
- Label: Independent
- Members: Chaz Terra; Jason Hope; Von Boldt; Nils Goldschmidt; Philip Paulsen
- Past members: Ro Viper; Lahi Cassiano; Burton Car; Laurent Cassiano; Jerry Quinlan; Noelle Schertzer

Velvet Chains is an American hard rock band based in Las Vegas, Nevada.

== History ==
=== Formation and first album (2018–2021) ===
The band was formed in 2018 in Las Vegas, Nevada by Nils Goldschmidt. He recruited the original lineup through an ad he posted on Craigslist. Initially the band would play covers at local bars and clubs, however in 2020 Nils decided to transition into an original band.

The band launched its first album "Icarus" on 24 September 2021. It was released with 10 songs, including two singles "Tattooed" and "Strangelove". It features guest appearances by guitarist Richard Fortus from Guns N' Roses, and bassist Jeff Rouse and guitarist Mike Squires, both from Duff McKagan's Loaded. This album was later taken down by the band in 2023; however 3 songs "Tattooed", "Pass The Disease" & "Wasted" were re-recorded with Ro Viper on vocals and re-uploaded.

The first single "Tattooed" features special guest appearance of Guns N' Roses guitarist Richard Fortus and it was released in July 2021.

=== Morbid Dreams EP and lineup transition (2022–2024 ) ===
The band launched its second EP "Morbid Dreams" on 21 October 2022. It was released with 6 songs, including three singles "Last Drop", "Back On The Train" and "Can't Win".

In 2023 the band released 3 new singles: "I Am The Ocean" produced by Kellen McGregor; "Stuck Against The Wall" produced by Erik Ron; and "Eyes Closed" produced by The Heavy and mixed by Joshua Wilbur. "Stuck Against The Wall" reached number 37 on the Billboard Mainstream Rock chart.

In 2024, the band underwent a transition in their lineup, with Ro Viper joining on vocals, Lahi Cassiano on lead guitar and backing vocals, alongside Jason Hope on drums, Von Boldt on rhythm guitar and backing vocals, and Nils Goldschmidt on bass and backing vocals, who is also the only original founding member. The band released the single "Dead Inside" in October 2024, which reached number 22 on the Billboard Mainstream Rock chart and spent 22 weeks in the Top 25.

=== Last Rites EP and current lineup (2025–present ) ===
In 2025, the band underwent another lineup change, with Chaz Terra joining as lead vocalist and Philip Paulsen joining as lead guitarist, replacing Ro Viper and Lahi Cassiano respectively. The revitalized lineup debuted with the single "Ghost In The Shell" in May 2025, which reached number 32 on the Billboard Mainstream Rock chart. Loudwire listed Velvet Chains as one of the bands to watch in 2026.

The band released their third EP "Last Rites" on 4 April 2025, followed by additional singles "Sins" and "How The Story Ends" later in the year, the latter reaching number 34 on the Billboard Mainstream Rock chart.

In early 2026, the band released the single "Hurt Me" in February, followed by "Dead In The Head" in March. The band joined the Des Rocs North America Tour 2026 alongside RØMES as support act, playing venues across the United States including stops in Atlanta, Dallas, Houston, Phoenix, Los Angeles, San Francisco, Portland, and Seattle, among others.

== Live Shows ==
The band participated in Rock Fest 2022 which was held July 13–16 in Cadott, Wisconsin, in Blue Ridge Rock Festival 2022 which was held September 8–11 in Alton, Virginia and in Summer Breeze Open Air Brasil Festival 2023 which was held April 26–28 in São Paulo, Brazil.

Velvet Chains has also opened for several mainstream acts including Stone Temple Pilots, The Winery Dogs, Saint Asonia, L.A. Guns and Last in Line, among others.

In early 2024 the band went on tour to Brazil with Slash featuring Myles Kennedy and the Conspirators, billed as their opening act for their "The River is Rising" tour. The shows were held in Belo Horizonte on January 29, in São Paulo on January 31, in Rio de Janeiro on February 1 and in Porto Alegre on February 4.

In May 2025, the band returned to Brazil to open for Stone Temple Pilots and performed at the Festival Porão do Rock in Brasília.

In early 2026, the band served as support act on the Des Rocs North America Tour 2026 alongside RØMES. The run included dates in Atlanta, Dallas, Houston, Phoenix, Los Angeles, San Francisco, Portland, Seattle, El Paso, Albuquerque, Tacoma, and other cities across the United States.

== Members ==
=== Current members ===
- Chaz Terra - lead vocals (2025-present )
- Jason Hope – drums (2022-present)
- Von Boldt – rhythm guitar and backing vocals (2024-present)
- Nils Goldschmidt – bass and backing vocals (2018-present)
- Philip Paulsen - lead guitar and backing vocals (2025-present)

=== Past members ===
- Ro Viper – lead vocals (2022-2025)
- Lahi Cassiano – lead guitar and backing vocals (2022-2025)
- Burton Car – lead guitar and backing vocals (2022-2023)
- Laurent Cassiano – lead guitar and backing vocals (2018-2022)
- Jerry Quinlan - lead vocals and rhythm guitar (2018-2021)
- Noelle Schertzer – drums (2018-2021)

== Discography ==
=== Icarus (2021) ===
1. "Before We Shine"
2. "Burning City"
3. "Tattooed" (feat. Richard Fortus)
4. "Pass the Disease" (feat. Mike Squires & Jeff Rouse)
5. "Wasted"
6. "Strangelove"
7. "Flexing"
8. "Sex Slave"
9. "Teenage Stoner"
10. "Gone"

=== Morbid Dreams (2022) EP ===
It was released on 21 October 2022 with 6 songs, including three singles "Last Drop", "Back On The Train" and "Can't Win".

1. "Back On The Train"
2. "Last Drop"
3. "Hiding From Stars"
4. "Can't Win"
5. "Time Stood Still"
6. "Fade Away"

=== Last Rites (2025) EP ===
It was released on 4 April 2025 with 7 songs including singles "Stuck Against the Wall", "Dead Inside", and "I Am The Ocean".

1. "Dead Inside"
2. "Enemy"
3. "Stuck Against The Wall"
4. "Eyes Closed"
5. "Suspicious Minds"
6. "I Am The Ocean"
7. "Run Away"

=== How The Story Ends (2026) EP ===
It was released on 10 July 2026 with 7 songs including singles "How The Story Ends", "Hurt Me", and "Ghost In The Shell".

1. "WAR"
2. "Sins"
3. "Ghost In The Shell"
4. "Dead In The Head"
5. "Hurt Me"
6. "Wide Awake"
7. "How The Story Ends"

=== Charted Singles ===
Title	Year	Peak chart positions	Album/EP
Title	Year	US Main.	Album/EP
"Stuck Against the Wall"	2023	37	Last Rites
"Dead Inside"	2024	22	Last Rites
"Ghost In the Shell"	2025	32	How the Story Ends
"How the Story Ends"	2025	34	How the Story Ends

=== Music videos ===
List of music videos, showing year released and directors
Title	Year	Director(s )
"Last Drop"	2022	Circus Head
"Back on the Train"	2022	Dean Karr
"Can't Win"	2022	Circus Head
"I Am the Ocean"	2023	Circus Head
"Stuck Against the Wall"	2023	Leo Liberti
"Eyes Closed"	2023	Julian Oyanedel
"Suspicious Minds"	2024	Leo Xavier
"Enemy"	2024	TFP Studios
"Dead Inside"	2024	Circus Head
"Ghost In the Shell"	2025	Deven Bussey
"Sins"	2025	Leo Xavier
"How the Story Ends"	2025	Julian Oyanedel
"Hurt Me"	2026	Cory Ingram
"Dead In The Head"	2026	Leo Xavier
"Wide Awake"	2026	Leo Xavier

== Awards ==
Year	Award	Category	Result
2021	Music Video Awards	Best Production Design	Finalist
2022	Richmond International Film Festival	Best Music Video	Nominated
2022	Premios Pulsar Chile	Best Rock Band	Nominated
2022	Santiago Horror Film Fest	Best Music Video	Won
