= Sick (Loaded album) =

Studio album by Loaded
- Released: March 30, 2009
- Recorded: June 4–18, 2008 at Jupiter Studios, Seattle, Washington
- Genre: Alternative rock, hard rock, punk rock
- Length: 49:50
- Label: Century Media; Eagle Rock Entertainment (reissue)
- Producer: Martin Feveyear

Loaded chronology
Wasted Heart (EP) (2008)	Sick (2009)	The Taking (2011)

Rerelease cover
- 2011 CD+DVD Edition

Singles from Sick
- 1. "Flatline" Released: 2009

Sick is the second studio album by American rock band Loaded. It is their first album since reforming after they went on hiatus in 2002. It was recorded and produced by Martin Feveyear at Jupiter Studios in Seattle, Washington, and was released on March 30, 2009, in Europe and April 7 in the US, through Century Media Records. Writing for the album began in 2008 when vocalist Scott Weiland departed Duff McKagan's other band, Velvet Revolver, in April of the same year. Recording for the follow-up to their 2001 debut album Dark Days began and was completed in June 2008.

Following the release of the album, Loaded went on to promote it for over half a year; releasing one single, "Flatline", and touring in several regions, including the United States, South America and several countries in Europe as well as playing at several music festivals. The album received generally positive reviews, many of which made some comparisons to McKagan's then-former band, Guns N' Roses.

== Background and production ==
When singer and guitarist Duff McKagan began working on a new project with his former Guns N' Roses bandmates Slash and Matt Sorum in 2002, he effectively put Loaded on hiatus the same year. Adding former Loaded guitarist Dave Kushner and Stone Temple Pilots singer Scott Weiland to the lineup, they formed the hard rock supergroup Velvet Revolver in 2003. They released their debut album, Contraband, in 2004 and the follow-up, Libertad, in 2007. Loaded reunited in 2006 to perform a benefit show for Jerry Allen's Cancer Fund and continued to play shows on occasion. Knowing that Velvet Revolver's tour was ending, McKagan announced that Loaded were working on a new album.

Loaded rented a rehearsal space and wrote new material including "Mothers Day," "I See Through You," "Sleaze Factory," "Flatline," and worked on older material such as "Sick," wrote in 2002, and "Wasted Heart," wrote in 2006–07. They began recording the album on June 4, 2008 with producer Martin Feveyear at Jupiter Studios in Seattle, Washington. The album was primarily recorded by the band, with Norman Baltzo, Greg Schroeder and Nate Schlermer providing horns on the song "Blind Date Girl," and was completed in less than two weeks, costing only $20,000. Loaded subsequently signed a deal with independent record label Century Media

== Promotion ==
Flatline
A sample of "Flatline" from Sick. The band's first single from Sick, described by McKagan as a good radio song and the most "mainstream" Loaded were going to get.

On June 24, 2008, Loaded made Dark Days available for free download, from select websites, to help promote the band. They began touring prior to the release of the album, touring the UK, Europe and Japan. They released an EP entitled Wasted Heart, featuring four songs from Sick as well as a bonus song, on September 22, 2008, to coincide with their European Tour. The band filmed and released a promotional music video for the song "No More" for the EP release. They also performed at the Italian music festival Rock of Ages, the Azkena Festival in Spain and the Loud Park Festival in Japan.

From June 2008 the band released several promotional webisodes, five on the making of "Sick" and one of the 2008 U.K. tour.

Following the release of Sick, Loaded toured the United States, South America, and Europe. They released one single, "Flatline," though it failed to chart. In June 2009, the performed at Download Festival in the UK Rock am Ring and Rock im Park in Germany, Rockfest in the United States, and the Sauna Open Air Festival in Finland. They joined Mötley Crüe on their tour of Europe, as their support band, before joining Black Stone Cherry on their tour of Europe and the UK.

== Release ==
Sick was released in Europe on March 20 and in the United States on April 7, 2009. It entered the U.S. Billboard Top Heetseakers charts at #43 in its first week, selling over 1,400 copies.

The iTunes Store edition of Sick included two bonus tracks: non-album track "Roll Away" and an instrumental version of the single "Flatline."

A Limited Deluxe Edition of Sick was released the same day as the standard Europe release. It included a bonus DVD of 2008 Loaded's show at The Garage in Glasgow, Scotland, a promotional music video of "No More" and the five of the band's Webisodes, with the addition of the UK Tour Webisode. This edition of the album was re-released on 20 May 2011, following the band's signing to Eagle Rock Entertainment. This edition also featured a new album cover, which was previously used only on limited edition LP versions of the album The iTunes edition was also updated.

== Reception ==
Professional ratings
Review scores
Source	Rating
About.com	3/5 stars
Allmusic	3/5 stars
Artistdirect	3.5/5 stars
Billboard	(positive)
Blogcritics	3.5/5 stars
The Boston Globe	(favourable)
Exclaim!	(negative)
Ultimate Guitar Archive	(7.7/10)

Sick was met with generally positive critical reviews. Most reviewers noted punk influences on the album and offered some comparison to that of McKagan's former band Guns N' Roses. Tim Grierson of About.com said that the band "will appeal to those who wished GNR had just kept making albums like Appetite for Destruction until the day they died" noting "[t]he emphasis is on brawling guitar riffs and three-minute songs" but "occasionally McKagan slows down the tempo for bluesy ballads." Stephen Thomas Erlewine of Allmusic stated that the album "doesn't necessarily rock with abandon" that "it's a bit too precise, a bit too clean for that" but "it does have a kick and spirit, enough energy to power through the somewhat pedestrian songwriting." Amy Sciarretto, reviewing the album for both Artistdirect and Ultimate Guitar Archive, compared McKagan's and Guns N' Roses singer Axl Rose vocals, noting a similarity between the two while stating the songs "Sick" and "Sleaze Factory" "blend Los Angeles glitz, Sunset glam and grunge, Seattle-inspired guitars" and "are kicked up by the punk rock intensity." Steve Morse of The Boston Globe notes Iggy Pop, Ramones and Lou Reed influences on the album, stating the "highlights are the riff-laced love songs with a domestic edge." Chris Beaumont of Blogcritics said that Loaded "come together as a solid unit, delivering the goods" on the album. He continued, stating that the songs "may not be the greatest, but there is an inviting quality about them that encourages listeners to just rock along for the ride" and noted that they "giv[ed] off a feeling of experience grounded by youthful energy."

== Track listing ==
All tracks are written by Loaded, except where noted

No.	Title	Writer(s)	Length
1.	"Sick"		2:51
2.	"Sleaze Factory"		3:47
3.	"Flatline"	Trey Bruce, Brian Howes, Duff McKagan	3:02
4.	"IOU"		3:36
5.	"The Slide"		3:10
6.	"Translucent"		3:08
7.	"Mother's Day"		3:50
8.	"I See Through You"		3:57
9.	"Forgive Me"	Bruce, Loaded	4:12
10.	"No Shame"	Bruce, McKagan, Mike Squires	3:32
11.	"Blind Date Girl"		5:10
12.	"Wasted Heart" (electric version)		4:57
13.	"No More"	Bruce, McKagan	4:33
Total length:			49:50

Bonus tracks on 2009 iTunes edition
No.	Title	Length
14.	"Roll Away"	4:59
15.	"Flatline (Instrumental)" (B-side to "Flatline" single)	3:01

Bonus tracks on 2011 iTunes edition & CD+DVD reissue edition
No.	Title	Length
14.	"Roll Away"	4:59
15.	"Wasted Heart" (acoustic)	4:33

Deluxe Edition DVD - Live at The Garage, Glasgow, UK, Sept. 22, 2008
No.	Title	Writer(s)	Length
1.	"Sick"
2.	"Queen Joanasophina"	McKagan
3.	"IOU"
4.	"No More"
5.	"Dark Days"	McKagan
6.	"Superman"	McKagan
7.	"Sleaze Factory"
8.	"Executioners Song"
9.	"10 Years"	McKagan, Gilby Clarke
10.	"Translucent"
11.	"I Wanna Be Your Dog" (The Stooges cover)	Dave Alexander, Ron Asheton, Scott Asheton, Iggy Pop
12.	"No More" (promo video)
13.	"Webisode #1"
14.	"Webisode #2"
15.	"Webisode #3"
16.	"Webisode #4"
17.	"Webisode #5"
18.	"UK Tour Webisode"

== Personnel ==
All information is excerpted from the album's stated information.

Loaded

- Duff McKagan - lead vocals, rhythm guitar, bass guitar on "Mother's Day"
- Geoff Reading - drums, backing vocals
- Jeff Rouse - bass guitar, backing vocals, lead vocals on "Translucent"
- Mike Squires - lead guitar, backing vocals

Additional personnel

- Norman Baltzo - horns on "Blind Date Girl"
- Greg Schroeder - horns on "Blind Date Girl"
- Nate Schlermer - horns on "Blind Date Girl"

Bonus DVD credits

- Dave Meehan - director
- Martin Feveyear - concert audio mixing, mastering
- Julie Briscoe - DVD authoring
- Paul Hurt - location audio
- David Ellison - camera
- Chris Moorcraft - camera
- Jake Meehan - camera
- Scott Johnson - camera
- Viv Quick - camera

Production

- Martin Feveyear - production, engineering, mixing, mastering, additional percussion
- Jon Ervie - assistance
- Stewart Shank - assistance
- William Brown - assistance
- Steve Joh - A&R
- Rick Canny - management
- Brian H. McPherson Esq. - legal
- Jenna Adler - US booking agent
- Ian Sales - Europe/UK booking agent
- Beth Sabbagh - accounting
- Christel Layton - accounting
- Terri Beverford - accounting
- Craig Howell - art design, layout
- Lance Mercer - photography

== Release history ==
Region	Date	Label	Format
Europe	March 30, 2009	Century Media	CD, CD/DVD, digital download, Vinyl
United States	April 7, 2009	Century Media	CD, CD/DVD, digital download, Vinyl
International	20 May 2011	Eagle Rock Entertainment	CD/DVD

== Charts ==
Chart (2009)	Peak Position
U.S. Billboard Top Heatseekers	43
