= Loaded (band) =

American hard rock band

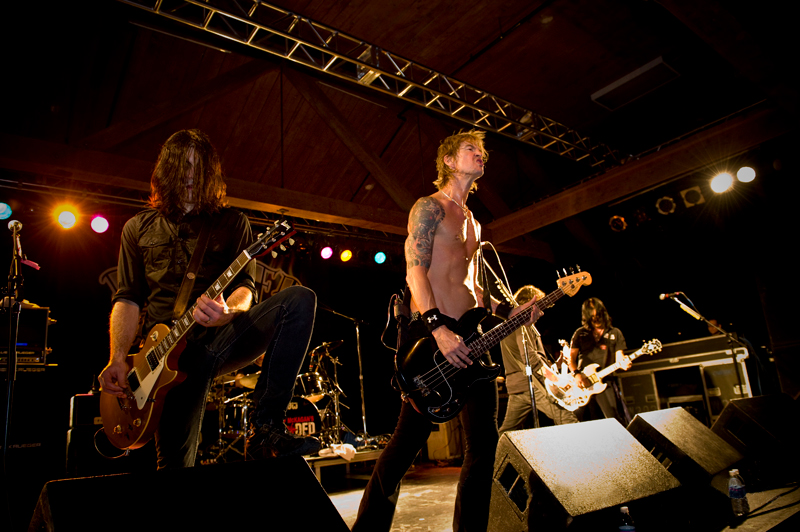
- Loaded performing in 2008

Background information
- Also known as: Duff McKagan's Loaded
- Origin: Seattle, Washington, United States
- Genres: Hard rock, punk rock
- Years active: 1999–2002; 2006–2012
- Labels: Pimp; EMI; Locomotive; Century Media; Eagle Rock Entertainment
- Members: Duff McKagan; Mike Squires; Jeff Rouse; Burke Thomas
- Past members: Michael Barragan; Taz Bentley; Dez Cadena; Geoff Reading; Dave Dederer; Dave Kushner; George Stuart Dahlquist; Isaac Carpenter

Loaded (also known as Duff McKagan's Loaded) was an American rock band from Seattle, Washington, formed in 1999. The band's most recent line-up included vocalist and rhythm guitarist Duff McKagan (Velvet Revolver and Guns N' Roses), lead guitarist Mike Squires (formerly of Nevada Bachelors and Alien Crime Syndicate) bassist Jeff Rouse (formerly of Alien Crime Syndicate, Sirens Sister, and Vendetta Red), and drummer Burke Thomas. Geoff Reading (formerly of New American Shame and Green Apple Quick Step) and Isaac Carpenter (formerly of Loudermilk, Gosling, and The Exies) were the band's previous drummers.

McKagan first formed Loaded to be his touring band in support of his unreleased solo album Beautiful Disease. The first lineup included Michael Barragan (formerly of Plexi), Dez Cadena (formerly of Black Flag), and Taz Bentley (formerly of The Reverend Horton Heat). The band disbanded before the end of 1999. After working on new material with drummer Geoff Reading, Loaded was reformed in 2001, adding guitarist Mike Squires and Jeff Rouse to the line-up, though both were briefly replaced by guitarist Dave Kushner (Velvet Revolver, formerly of Wasted Youth and Electric Love Hogs) and bassist George Stuart Dahlquist (formerly of Asva and Burning Witch) in 2002.

Loaded released three studio albums, Dark Days (2001), Sick (2009) and The Taking (2011), one extended play called Wasted Heart (2008), and one live album called Episode 1999: Live (1999). Following McKagan and Kushner's involvement in "The Project" that later became Velvet Revolver, Loaded were put on hiatus, though they still played shows on occasion. Following the departure of Stone Temple Pilots singer Scott Weiland from Velvet Revolver, Loaded returned from hiatus in 2008 to record and release their second album. The following year, Reading left the group and was replaced by Isaac Carpenter. While never having officially disbanded, the group has not been active since 2012.

== History ==
=== Early years and Formation (1999) ===
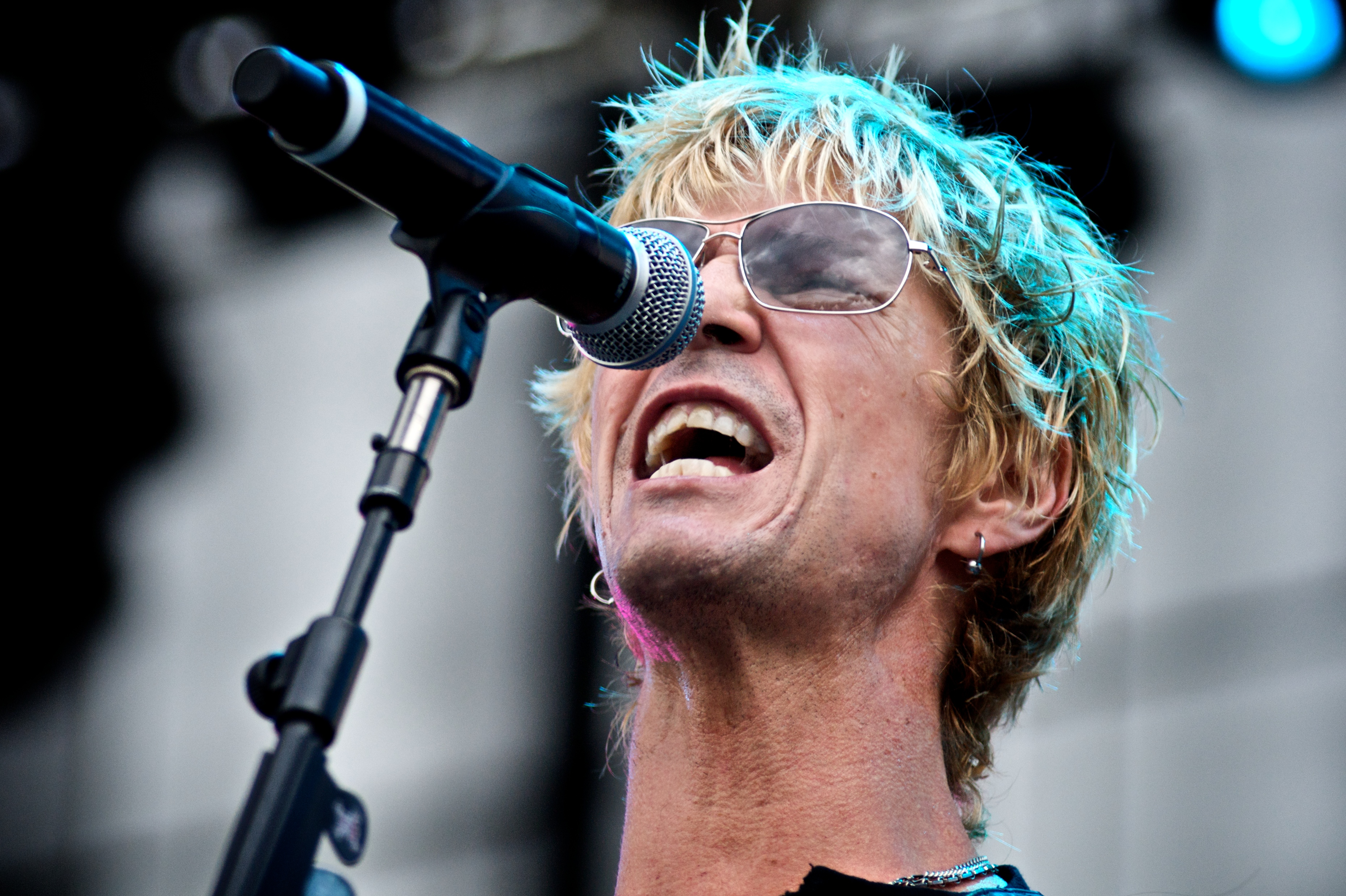
Vocalist and guitarist Duff McKagan formed the first line-up of Loaded in 1999.

Duff McKagan was previously a member of Guns N' Roses from the mid-1980s to late 1990s. Guns N' Roses achieved international success, going on to sell over 100 million albums worldwide, but personal and creative differences within the band resulted in members departing or being fired, with McKagan departing in 1997.

McKagan moved back to Seattle, reforming previous group 10 Minute Warning, releasing one self-titled album on Sub Pop in 1998, before recording his second solo album Beautiful Disease the same year. Featuring collaborations with former Faith No More drummer Mike Bordin, former Black Flag singer Dez Cadena and his former Guns N' Roses band mates Slash and Izzy Stradlin, Beautiful Disease was scheduled to be released through Geffen in 1999. McKagan formed Loaded, initially as The Gentlemen, to be his band for the tour supporting the album. With McKagan performing lead vocals and bass duties, Loaded's line-up consisted of guitarists Dez Cadena and Michael Barragan as well as drummer Taz Bentley.

McKagan began promoting the album; however, following the merger between Geffen and Interscope Records, he was dropped from the label and lost all commercial rights to release the record with only a few promo copies being leaked. Loaded continued to tour and released a live album, Episode 1999: Live, independently, which was recorded and mixed by Nick Raskulinecz. They re-recorded half of Beautiful Disease and received offers from four labels. However, they disbanded before the end of the year, with McKagan and Bentley becoming part of Izzy Stradlin's rhythm section for his tour of Japan supporting Ride On.

=== Reformation and Dark Days (2000–2002) ===
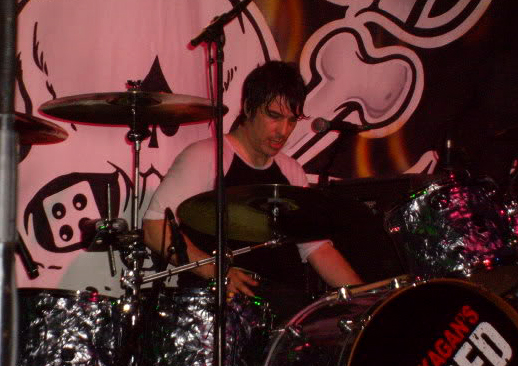
Drummer Geoff Reading reformed Loaded with McKagan in 2001.

By early 2000, McKagan had begun working on a new project with singer Mark Lanegan and drummer Geoff Reading. Though they recorded a number of songs, Lanegan left to join Queens of the Stone Age. After being convinced by Reading and Martin Feveyear to take over lead vocals, they continued to write and record new material at Jupiter Studios. With nearly an album's worth of material recorded, they decided to re-record some of the songs from Beautiful Disease to add to the material they already had. Though primarily recorded by McKagan and Reading, Dave Dederer, who joined the band as bassist, and Mike Squires recorded additional drums, while Feveyear, who also produced the album, recorded additional keyboards.

The resulting album, titled Dark Days, was released in the United States and Japan in July 2001, through Artistdirect and EMI, while it was released in Europe, through Locomotive Music, a year later. Rather than releasing the album under his own name, McKagan readopted the Loaded moniker. They announced three dates at the House of Blues taking place in Anaheim, California, Las Vegas, Nevada, and West Hollywood, California (where they were joined onstage by Slash) in November 2001, adding Mike Squires and Jeff Rouse, who replaced Dederer, to the lineup on lead and bass guitar, respectively, while Feveyear performed keyboards and percussion. Loaded played more shows in the US (where they were joined on stage by Billy Duffy and Matt Sorum during a show in Los Angeles) before going on to tour Japan. They toured Japan as part of Fire Wire, supporting J and Zilch, where McKagan first met guitarist Dave Kushner, who was, then, the Zilch guitarist.

Following the tour, Rouse and Squires departed the band when Alien Crime Syndicate signed with V2 Records for the re-release of their latest album. Loaded enlisted Dave Kushner and George Stuart Dahlquist and announced a tour of Europe, playing shows in the Netherlands, Germany, France, Italy, and Spain, as well as shows in the UK.

=== Hiatus and Velvet Revolver (2002–2008) ===
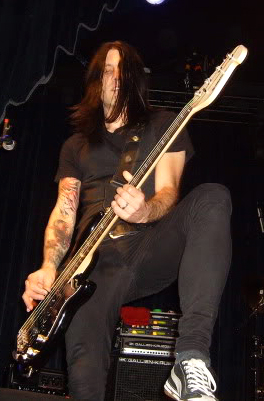
Jeff Rouse has been a member of Loaded since 2001. He toured with McKagan's successor in Guns N' Roses, Tommy Stinson, during the group's hiatus.

After performing at a benefit gig for Randy Castillo in 2002, McKagan began collaborating with his former Guns N' Roses band mates, Slash and Matt Sorum, on a new project. Because of this, Loaded's tour of Europe was cancelled. Loaded played a show at Hollywood's Viper Room, where afterwards, McKagan introduced Kushner to Slash, who were previously friends in junior high and high school. Kushner was invited to play with the group and soon after became a member of "The Project" which, after auditioning a number of singers, became known as Velvet Revolver following the addition of Stone Temple Pilots singer Scott Weiland to the line-up. Loaded were effectively put on hiatus. However, they would still continue to play shows on occasion, though they did not play together again until December 2006 for the benefit show for Jerry Allen's Cancer Fund, with both Squires and Rouse returning to the group.

During the hiatus, the Loaded members continued to work on various projects. Reading formed the group The Disciples (that later became The Chelsea Smiles) with Christian Martucci, Todd Youth, and Howie Pyro. Rouse would release another album with Alien Crime Syndicate, titled Ten Songs in the Key of Betrayal, who went on the perform as Tommy Stinson's backing band in support of his solo album Village Gorilla Head. Following the tour, Rouse joined Vendetta Red, replacing previous bassist Michael Vermillion, on their tour in support of their latest album Sisters of the Red Death. However, they disbanded in March 2006, with Rouse and former Vendetta Red members Zach Davidson and Leif Andersen, as well as local drummer Ben Libay, forming the group Sirens Sister. They released one album in 2006, before Rouse left the group in 2007. Squires re-joined The Long Winters, having been a member prior to joining Loaded, playing with the group for less than a year before departing.

=== Reunion, Wasted Heart and Sick (2008–2009) ===
Flatline
A sample of "Flatline" from Sick. The band's first single from Sick, described by McKagan as a good radio song and the most "mainstream" Loaded were going to get.

While on tour with Velvet Revolver in 2008, McKagan stated that Loaded were to release a new album in the summer and were to enter the studio in April. Soon after the end of their tour, Velvet Revolver announced the departure of Weiland, putting the group on hiatus until they find a new singer. Previously, the Loaded members worked on material by sending mp3 files to each other.

They rented a rehearsal space and began working on the new material before going on to record the album at Jupiter Studios with producer Martin Feveyear. They released a series of Webisodes during this time, featuring footage from the recording sessions for the group's new album. They booked a tour of the UK and Ireland and were added to the lineups of few European festivals. The album was completed in less than two weeks and cost only $20,000.

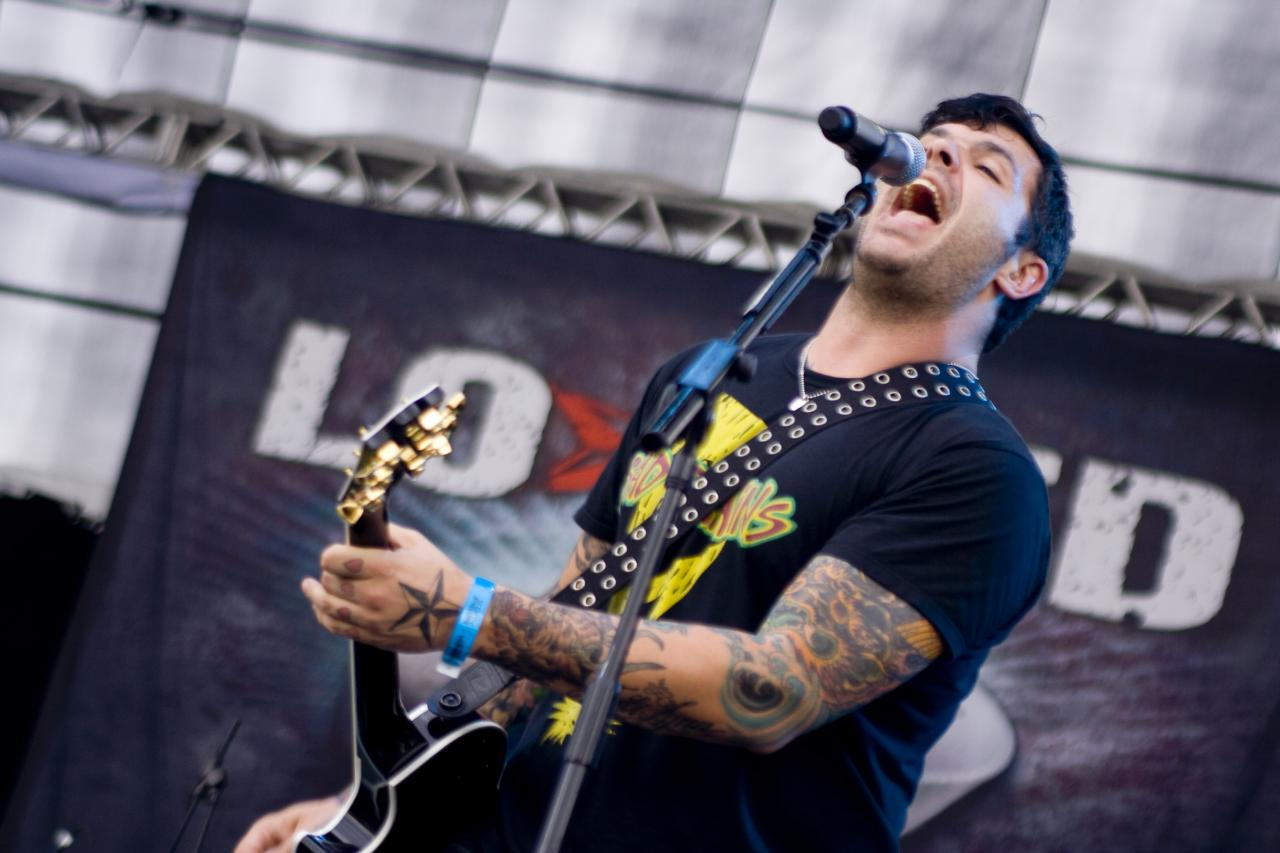
Mike Squires performing with Loaded at the Maquinaria Festival in São Paulo, Brazil

Loaded subsequently signed a deal with Century Media and, at the suggestion of the label, voted to change the name of the group to Duff McKagan's Loaded, stating that "[they could] always just turn it back to Loaded once [they] get [their] foot in the door." The album's release was pushed back to 2009. However, to coincide with their European Tour, an EP entitled Wasted Heart was released on September 22, 2008. They released a music video for the song "No More" for the EP release.

Loaded's second album, Sick, was released on March 20, 2009 in Europe and April 7 in the US, peaking at number 43 on the Billboard Top Heatseekers chart. Sick sold 1,400 copies in the first week, while "Flatline" was chosen as the first single to go to radio. The album received generally positive reviews, with Stephen Thomas Erlewine of Allmusic stating "Loaded is the sound of a working band working and an old rocker staying sober, kicking out some lead-heavy grooves and sculptured pieces of sleaze."

I am sad to report that, for now, I have to step down as drummer for Duff McKagan's Loaded. The pressures of being in the "Duff from Guns N' Roses" spotlight, while thrilling, have left me unable to get back to the performer I was pre-cancer, and unable to properly provide for my family. This combination has plagued my mental recovery, and I need to take time-now-to focus on these things.

— Geoff Reading announcing his departure.

In support of Sick, Loaded played a number of shows in the United States, South America, and Europe, while also appearing at a number of festivals such as Download in the UK, Rock am Ring and Rock im Park in Germany, Rockfest in the United States, and the Sauna Open Air Festival in Finland. They also opened for Mötley Crüe and Black Stone Cherry on their tours of Europe. At a number of shows, Loaded were joined onstage by other musicians such as Ron "Bumblefoot" Thal (Guns N' Roses), Corey Taylor (Slipknot and Stone Sour), and Michael Monroe (formerly of Hanoi Rocks).

In September 2009, Reading departed the group and was replaced by Isaac Carpenter formerly of Gosling and The Exies. In the middle of touring, McKagan posted an update on his Twitter stating that the group will "be writing new songs tonight and tomorrow." He added, "Some great ideas and riffs have come on this latest tour. excited, for sure!"

In December, Loaded, along with Queensrÿche, were confirmed at the "KISW Salutes the Shield" benefit show that took place on December 19 at the Snoqualmie Casino in Snoqualmie, Washington where, during the show, they were joined on stage by Queensrÿche singer Geoff Tate.

=== The Taking and later activities (2010–2012) ===
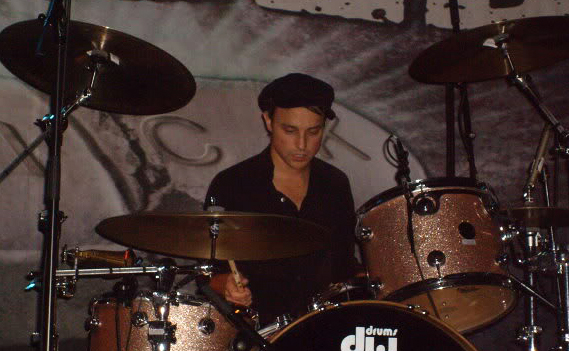
Isaac Carpenter became Loaded's new drummer following the departure of Geoff Reading in 2009.

In February 2010, Loaded parted ways with Century Media and began looking for a new label, having already written and demoed new material. The same month, both McKagan and Rouse performed at the Hootenanny For Haiti at the Showbox at the Market in Seattle with Pearl Jam guitarist Mike McCready and Fastbacks bassist Kim Warnick, as well as Truly and former Screaming Trees drummer Mark Pickerel, among others.

While Loaded were briefly inactive, guitarist Mike Squires performed with Green Apple Quick Step on a few occasions and McKagan began writing and recording with Jane's Addiction. McKagan was confirmed as a permanent member of the group, in April, performing at shows in the United States and Europe. His tenure with the band only lasted five months, with his departure from the group announced on September 6. In a statement, the band commented: "We wanted to thank Duff for helping us write songs for our new record. We love the songs we worked on with him—and the gigs were a blast—but musically we were all headed in different directions. From here Duff is off to work on his own stuff so we wish him all the best".

During his time with Jane's Addiction, McKagan stated that they were writing material for their new album, while he also stated that "Loaded will ALWAYS be something I do. It is more a way of life and a way to express music and have a fucking blast with those guys than anything else." Loaded entered the studio in August with Terry Date, who had approached the band about producing their album, and they completed it by the beginning of September.

A new song by the band entitled "We Win" is being used by ESPN and Major League Baseball for their coverage of the American League Championship Series, the National League Championship Series, and the World Series. They also signed a deal with Eagle Rock Entertainment for the release of their new album, titled The Soundtrack, to be released on March 22, 2011, and the label is also re-releasing their previous album, Sick, in April of the same year. It was later revealed in interviews with guitarist Mike Squires and filmmaker Jamie Burton Chamberlin that the album title was changed to The Taking and was to be released on April 19. The band are also collaborating with filmmaker and documentarian Jamie Burton Chamberlin on a film based on the album. Chamberlin stated that the film would be more "about designing a fictitious story line which will be a part of the larger project, and will be a contemporary version of, say, Hard Days Night meets (Led Zeppelin's) Song Remains the Same, with aspects of documentary, music video, and live performance, all interconnected by an underlying motivation" and that the "album will serve as the soundtrack." Chamberlin filmed Loaded at the Seattle Seahawks Veterans Day half-time show on November 7.

The film is to feature a number of cameos from various musicians, including John Roderick of The Long Winters, Chris Ballew of The Presidents of the United States of America, Soundgarden members Ben Shepherd and Kim Thayil, and Lemmy of Motörhead. Shooting locations for the film include Seattle, with the band planning to perform unannounced acoustic shows for filming, and Los Angeles. Chamberlin hopes to premier the film at the 2011 SXSW and a trailer for it was released in January 2011. Loaded were confirmed to play at the Download Festival, which took place in June 2011.

The Taking was released on April 18, 2011 in Europe and April 19 in the US, and charted at number 12 on the Billboard Top Heatseekers chart, selling over 2,300 copies in the first week. They released a video for the song "Dead Skin", directed by Chamberlin, and the album received positive reviews. Allmusic reviewer Stephen Thomas Erlewine gave the album three out of five stars stating that McKagan "turns in his hardest record in recent memory" and that the album "does make a brute impression ... playing with a vitality that almost compensates for how they fetishize the past." Revolver magazine's Kory Grow complimented its "big hooks and driving riffs" while noting punk influences on the album.

While the group never officially disbanded, Loaded has not been active since 2012. McKagan later returned to Guns N' Roses in 2016, while Carpenter joined as their drummer in 2025.

== Musical style and influences ==
Seattlehead
A sample of "Seattlehead" from Dark Days. "Seattlehead" has featured on two Loaded releases; Dark Days and Episode 1999: Live as well as the Angelina EP the Neurotic Outsiders and McKagan's unreleased solo album Beautiful Disease.

Loaded's music has often been described as hard rock with elements of punk, earning comparisons to the Ramones, Iggy Pop and Lou Reed, as well as McKagan's then-former band Guns N' Roses. The band cites influences from groups such as The Rolling Stones, The Saints, Thin Lizzy, Black Flag and Fear among others. Blogcritics reviewer Chris Beaumont stated that their music "is bluesy hard rock that occasionally borders on the punk side of the coin. It is simultaneously slick and raw, yet it lacks the power and fury of old school Guns N' Roses or the full-on force of Velvet Revolver. Regardless, there is something decidedly infectious in its stripped-down nature."

== Band members ==
Final lineup

- Duff McKagan – lead vocals (1999–2002, 2008–2012), rhythm guitar (2000–2002, 2008–2012), bass (1999–2001, 2008)
- Mike Squires – lead guitar, backing vocals (2001–2002, 2008–2012)
- Jeff Rouse – bass, backing vocals (2001–2002, 2008–2012)
- Burke Thomas - drums (2011–2012)

Former members

- Michael Barragan – lead guitar (1999)
- Taz Bentley – drums (1999)
- Dez Cadena – lead guitar (1999)
- Chris Tucker – lead guitar (1999)
- Geoff Reading – drums, percussion, backing vocals (2000–2002, 2008–2009)
- Dave Dederer – lead guitar, bass (2000–2001)
- Martin Feveyear – keyboards, percussion, samples, backing vocals (2001–2002)
- Dave Kushner – lead guitar (2002)
- George Stuart Dahlquist – bass (2002)
- Isaac Carpenter – drums, percussion (2009–2011)

== Discography ==
- Dark Days (2001)
- Sick (2009)
- The Taking (2011)
