= Geoff Reading =

American drummer (born 1968)

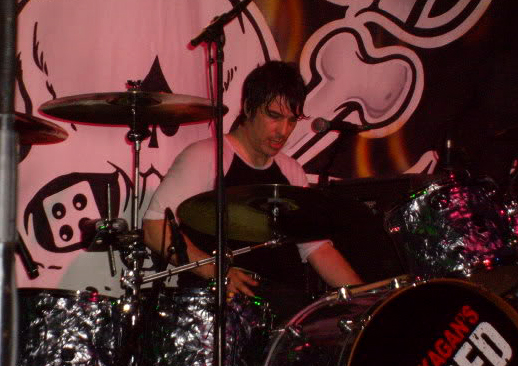
- Reading performing with Loaded in 2008

Background information
- Born: February 23, 1968 (age 57)
- Origin: Rochester, New York, U.S.
- Genres: Hard rock, punk rock, alternative rock, post-grunge
- Occupation: Drummer
- Years active: 1989–present

Geoff Reading (born February 23, 1968) is an American drummer. In his career, he has been a member of a number of groups, including Loaded (the group formed and fronted by Duff McKagan of Velvet Revolver and Guns N' Roses), Green Apple Quick Step, New American Shame, The Disciples (which featured Christian Martucci, Todd Youth and Howie Pyro and later changed their name to The Chelsea Smiles) and Top Heavy Crush while he also recorded with The Pin-Ups (founded by former members of Green Apple Quick Step and The Presidents of the United States of America).

Currently, Reading performs, on occasion, with Green Apple Quick Step, and is a columnist for WeeklyVolcano.com.

== Biography ==
=== Personal life ===
Geoff Reading was born on February 23, 1968, in Rochester, New York and was raised in both Huntington Beach, California and Edmonds, Washington before eventually settling in Seattle, Washington. Reading, recently engaged, currently resides in Tacoma, Washington where he's raising his son, having moved from Los Angeles, California, and writes a column for WeeklyVolcano.com. Reading was previously diagnosed with colorectal cancer but successfully underwent treatment and chemotherapy.

=== Early music career (1989–1997) ===
Reading first starting playing drums in his early teens and was taught by neighborhood friend Mike Mongrain. Years later, Mongrain recommended to his former bandmate, local guitarist Scott Wade, that he invite Reading to join his band Sledge to which Wade responded by visiting Reading on his 21st birthday. He played with Sledge between 1989 and 1991, during which time they did only two recordings and shared a couple of bills with Inspector Luv and the Ride Me Babys, the group featuring the future members of Green Apple Quick Step.

=== Green Apple Quick Step (1997–1998, 2010) ===
In 1997, Reading joined the post-grunge group Green Apple Quick Step, replacing previous drummer Dain Hudson. Prior to joining, the group had recorded a new album with Columbia Records however it remains unreleased. He played at numerous shows with the group, including a show in Seattle where front man Tyler Willman destroyed various equipment on stage, before the group disbanded.

On March 26, 2010, Reading performed with Green Apple Quick Step, whose lineup consisted of members Tyler Willman, Dana Turner along with singer Christa Wells and Reading's former Loaded bandmate Mike Squires, at the Hell's Kitchen in Tacoma, Washington.

=== New American Shame (1999–2000) ===
Following the departure of previous drummer Jack Stringham, Reading joined New American Shame who went on the sign a major-label deal with Atlantic Records. After some adjustments, as well as some new drum tracks by Reading, Atlantic re-released the self-titled album, previously released on Will Records, in 1999. The first single from the record was "Under it All", which peaked at number 35 on the Mainstream Rock Chart, and a tour of the US, with The Cult, and Japan followed however the single did not perform well on rock and alternative radio stations.

=== Loaded (2001–2002, 2008–2009) ===
In late 1999, early 2000, McKagan decided to form a new project, with no title at this point, with drummer Geoff Reading, formerly of Green Apple Quick Step and New American Shame, and singer Mark Lanegan, formerly of the Screaming Trees. They recorded a number of songs before Lanegan left to join Queens of the Stone Age. After being convinced by Reading to take over lead vocals, McKagan and Reading continued to write and record new material. With nearly an album's worth of material recorded, they decided to re-record some of the songs from Beautiful Disease to add to the material they already had. Also for recording, they brought in guitarist Dave Dederer formerly of The Presidents of the United States of America, producer Martin Feveyear, who also performed keyboards on the album, and they recorded the album at Jupiter Studios in Seattle, Washington. McKagan performed the bass on all tracks as well as guitar and the piano on the song "Misery". Former Nevada Bachelors and Harvey Danger guitarist Mike Squires was also invited to record additional guitar parts on the album. In June 2001, McKagan announced that the album would be titled Dark Days and that it would be released under the moniker Loaded rather than using his own name for the project. According to drummer Geoff Reading, the band initially did not have a name and settled on Loaded when it came close to their first show:

'Duff had used the name previously as you all know. but when he and i first started playing together it wasn't a foregone conclusion that we would also use that as a (bad ass) moniker. but the closer we came to the first show (and the need for a name) we started kicking around ideas. coming up with a name is the absolute worst part of starting a new band (which is kinda what we felt we had done). but in the end it was hard to come up with something better, and the fact that we were able to pilfer the copyright on the name back from a less than stand up person we were entrenched with at the time seemed to be the gods of rock pointing us in the direction they wanted us to roll.'

Dark Days was released in the US and Japan in July 2001. It was later released in Europe in July 2002. Loaded announced three dates at the House of Blues taking place in Anaheim, California, Las Vegas, Nevada and West Hollywood, California in November. Before these shows, Squires officially the group as lead guitarist and was joined by Alien Crime Syndicate bassist Jeff Rouse. In January 2002, Loaded announced a string of dates in the US and Japan. During one of the shows, in Los Angeles, Loaded were joined onstage by The Cult duo Billy Duffy and Matt Sorum, also formerly of Guns N' Roses. After these shows, Squires left Loaded to join bandmate Jeff in Alien Crime Syndicate and was replaced by former Wasted Youth and Electric Love Hogs guitarist Dave Kushner. When Loaded went on a semi-hiatus, still playing shows occasionally, following the formation of Velvet Revolver both Squires and Jeff returned to the group.

In December 2006, the group reunited for a special benefit show for Jerry Allen's Cancer Fund. Supporting Loaded that night were Top Heavy Crush and Jeff Angell of Post Stardom Depression.

In February 2008, while on tour with Velvet Revolver, McKagan announced that Loaded were planning on releasing a new album in the summer. During the United Kingdom leg of Velvet Revolver's tour in April, McKagan stated that Loaded were to enter the studio in late April. After a few jam sessions, Loaded began recording what would become Sick with Dark Days producer Martin Feveyear at Jupiter Studios in Seattle. They released a series of Webisodes during this time featuring footage from the recording sessions for the group's new album which was completed in less than 2 weeks. After signing a deal with Century Media, the band changed their moniker to Duff McKagan's Loaded to help promote the band further and an EP, Wasted Heart, was released September 22, 2008, to coincide with their European Tour. Sick was released on March 20, 2009, in Europe and April 7, 2009, in the United States where it placed at number 43 on the Billboard Heatseekers Chart selling 1,400 copies. Loaded toured in support of Sick playing dates in the United States and appearing at several European festivals such as Download in the United Kingdom, Rock AM/IM in Germany and they also supported Mötley Crüe on their European tour.

In September 2009, Reading announced his departure from the band and at the same time he informed everyone that his replacement was Isaac Carpenter formerly of Loudermilk, Gosling and The Exies:

'I am sad to report that, for now, I have to step down as drummer for Duff McKagan's Loaded.

The pressures of being in the "Duff from Guns N' Roses" spotlight, while thrilling, have left me unable to get back to the performer I was pre-cancer, and unable to properly provide for my family. This combination has plagued my mental recovery, and I need to take time-now-to focus on these things.

The fellas have hired the great Isaac Carpenter to fill in for the UK tour, with a warm-up show at the Chop-Suey in Seattle on Oct 3. I wouldn't miss this show for anything. Issac is an AMAZING drummer and I, for one, will be right there in front of the stage, with all you Capitol Hill hipsters, arms folded, judging them.

=== Other projects ===
In 2002, Reading formed the group The Disciples, that later went on to become The Chelsea Smiles, that signed to Capitol Records. The group's lineup was rounded up by Christian Martucci, formerly of Dee Dee Ramone's band, Todd Youth, formerly of Danzig and Howie Pyro who had also played with Danzig and D Generation. They toured Japan before securing the deal with Capitol, and played a show at the Viper Room in Hollywood, California supporting the group Metal Shop, who have since changed their name and are now known as Steel Panther. During the show, Reading met Tony Alva. Reading also performed in former Beautiful Creatures guitarist DJ Ashba's solo band as well as some session work for the group Black Chihua Hua, whose record was produced by Joey Santiago. In 2000, Reading contributed drums and backing vocals to The Pin-Ups, the group featuring former members of Green Apple Quick Step and The Presidents of the United States of America, debut album Backseat Memoirs.

== Discography ==
Title	Release	Label	Band
New American Shame	1999	Atlantic	New American Shame
Backseat Memoirs	2000	GoodInk	The Pin-Ups
Dark Days	2002	Pimp	Loaded
Wasted Heart	2008	Century Media	Loaded
Sick	2009	Century Media	Loaded
