= Mike Squires =

Mike Squires may refer to:

- Mike Squires (baseball)
- Mike Squires (musician)
