= The Catheters =

American punk rock band

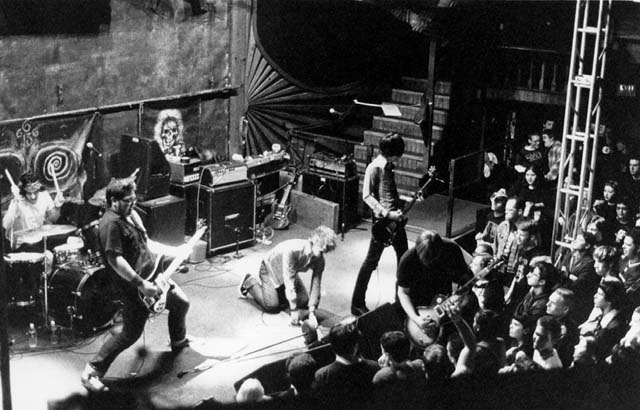
- The Catheters in San Francisco, 2000

Background information
- Origin: Seattle, Washington, U.S.
- Genres: Indie; Hard rock Garage Rock
- Years active: 1995–2004
- Labels: Sub Pop eMpTy
- Past members: Brian Standeford; Derek Mason; Davey Brozowski; Paul Waude; James Lysons; Lars Swenson; Leo Gebhardt
- Website: Official website

The Catheters were an American punk rock band from Bellevue, Washington, which formed in 1995 as a 4-piece with singer Brian Standeford, guitarist Derek Mason, bassist Paul Waude, and drummer James Lysons (who was soon replaced by Davey Borozowski of the band Damaged Goods). They originally played hardcore punk in the vein of bands such as Black Flag and The Circle Jerks. In 1998 they added second guitarist Lars Swenson and began cultivating a dirtier '70s glam-rock sound, as heard on their eMpTy Records releases. The records sold fairly well and gained them the attention of larger labels such as DreamWorks and Sub Pop, the latter of whom signed the band to a recording contract in 1999.

Over the course of their career they did extensive roadwork, touring North America and Europe with bands such as Sparta, Mudhoney, Run Run Run, Division of Laura Lee, and, often, the Murder City Devils.

Waude and Swenson left the band in 2001 for other projects, and the Catheters continued as a 4-piece with longtime roadie Leo Gebhardt joining as bassist. In 2002, with the help of a popular music video, they scored an indie hit with the song "Nothing", from their album Static Delusions and Stone-Still Days (Sub Pop, 2002). After releasing more singles and touring heavily in 2002 and 2003, the band released the acclaimed album Howling...It Grows and Grows!!! (Sub Pop, 2004), which infused their earlier sound with elements of classic rock.

The Catheters played their final show on October 15, 2004 at Seattle's Sunset Tavern, joined by friends the Vells and blackbelt (who played some old-school Catheters covers), ending the show with a mass sing-along to their song '"Fake ID" which degenerated into instrument destruction and a minor brawl. The band dissolved amicably, with Brian Standeford and Davey Borozowski forming the group Tall Birds (later joined by Leo Gebhardt), while Derek Mason went on to play keyboards in the Girls and bass in Sunday Night Blackout. After Tall Birds disbanded, Standeford started Idle Times, while Borozowski went on to form the band Black Whales. Borozowski also tours with the popular indie rock band Modest Mouse as their percussionist/second drummer, alongside Jeremiah Green. Idle times has released two seven-inches, and Black Whales have an EP on Mt Fuji Records and a self-released full-length album. Mason's band the Girls are on Dirtnap Records.

The Catheters reunited to play a birthday party in January 2013, and the Sub Pop Jubilee in June 2013.

== Lineup ==
- Brian Standeford – vocals, guitar
- Derek Mason – guitar
- Davey Brozowski – drums
- Paul Waude – bass (1995–2001)
- James Lysons – drums (1995–1996)
- Lars Swenson – guitar (1998–2001)
- Leo Gebhardt – bass (2001–2004)

== Discography ==
- No Escape EP – Beer City, #76 (1997)
- The Kids Know How To Rock 7" – eMpTy Records, MTR-375 (1999)
- The Catheters LP – eMpTy Records, MTR-380 (1999)
- Put It Together / Days Gone By 7" – Sub Pop, SP-474 (1999)
- It Can't Stay This Way (Forever) b/w Means To an End 7" – Kapow, KP-005 (2000)
- Build A Home b/w Hang Up 7" – Sub Pop, SP-578 (2001)
- Static Delusions and Stone-Still Days LP – Sub Pop, SP-568 (2002)
- 3000 Ways UK-Only CD-EP – Sub Pop, SP-596 (2002)
- I Fall Easy/Pale Horse/Looks Good On Me UK press 7" – Sub Pop, SP-604 (2002)
- Howling...It Grows and Grows!!! LP – Sub Pop, SP-618 (2004)
- No Natural Law CD-EP – Sub Pop, SP-634 (2004)
