= The Taking (album) =

Studio album by Loaded
- Released: April 19, 2011
- Recorded: August–September 2010
- Studio: Studio X, Seattle, Washington
- Genre: Hard rock, punk rock
- Label: Eagle Rock Entertainment, Armoury
- Producer: Terry Date

Loaded chronology
Sick (2009)	The Taking (2011)

The Taking is the third and final album by the American rock band Loaded. It was produced by Terry Date in Seattle, Washington, and was released on April 19, 2011, through Eagle Rock Entertainment. Writing for the album began in 2009, while the band was touring in support of Sick. It was the first Loaded release since Episode 1999: Live, without drummer Geoff Reading, who, after departing the band, was replaced by Isaac Carpenter in September 2009.

A feature-length film about the album and the band was released by filmmaker and documentarian Jamie Burton Chamberlin. Titled Duff McKagan's Loaded: The Taking, the film was edited into twelve music videos and released in episodes on YouTube.

== Background and production ==
In July 2009, singer and guitarist Duff McKagan announced, during Loaded's tour, that the band was writing new material for their next album. He said that they have some "great ideas and riffs" that the band wrote during their tour. Loaded parted ways with record label Century Media in February 2010 with the band continuing the work on new material. Prior to the beginning of recording, producer Terry Date approached the band and offered to produce the new album, with recording beginning, at Studio X, in August 2010, and completed by the beginning of September. On October 28, it was announced that the band had signed a deal with Eagle Rock Entertainment for the release of their album. In November, Blabbermouth.net announced the album's title, The Soundtrack, with a release date scheduled for March 22, 2011. It was later revealed in interviews with guitarist Mike Squires and filmmaker Jamie Burton Chamberlin that the album title was changed to The Taking, and the release date was changed from March 22, to April 19, 2011.

== Promotion ==
A new song by Loaded from the album entitled "We Win" is being used by ESPN and Major League Baseball for their coverage of the American League Championship Series, National League Championship Series, and the World Series while a second song entitled "Fight On" was confirmed for the album. Loaded performed the two new songs at the Seattle Seahawks Veterans Day half time show on November 7.

=== Film ===
Loaded began collaborating with filmmaker and documentarian Jamie Burton Chamberlin on a film based on the album in October 2010. Chamberlin stated that the film would be more "about designing a fictitious story line which will be a part of the larger project, and will be a contemporary version of, say, Hard Days Night meets (Led Zeppelin's) Song Remains the Same, with aspects of documentary, music video, and live performance, all interconnected by an underlying motivation" and that the "album will serve as the soundtrack." The film was planned to feature a number of cameos from various musicians, including John Roderick of The Long Winters, Chris Ballew of the Presidents of the United States of America, Soundgarden members Ben Shepherd and Kim Thayil as well as Lemmy of Motörhead. Shooting locations for the film included Seattle, with the band planning to perform unannounced acoustic shows for filming, and Los Angeles. Chamberlin hoped to premier the film at the 2011 SXSW while a trailer for the film was released in January 2011. The film was eventually released in episodic format by Eagle Rock Entertainment on YouTube in 2012.

== Release ==
The album was released in a number of versions with different bonus tracks, including Japanese version with three acoustic tracks and digital version with instrumental versions of the album's songs and non-album single "Fight On".

== Critical reception ==
Professional ratings
Aggregate scores
Source	Rating
Metacritic	(65/100)
Review scores
Source	Rating
Allmusic	3/5 stars
Canoe.ca	3.5/5 stars
Fast Forward Weekly	(mixed)
Kerrang!	3/5 stars
PopMatters	5/10 stars
Record Collector	2/5 stars
Revolver	4/5 stars
Sputnikmusic	3.5/5 stars
Ultimate Guitar Archive	(8/10)
Winnipeg Free Press	(positive)

The Taking received generally positive reviews, scoring a 65 out of 100 ("generally favorable reviews") on Metacritic based on five reviews. Allmusic reviewer Stephen Thomas Erlewine gave the album three out of five stars stating that McKagan "turns in his hardest record in recent memory" and that the album "does make a brute impression [...] playing with a vitality that almost compensates for how they fetishize the past." Kerrang! magazine stated that with the album, "Loaded sound like a proper band now." Revolver magazine's Kory Grow complimented its "big hooks and driving riffs" while noting punk influences on the album. Joseph Viney, reviewing for Sputnikmusic, gave the album a three-and-a-half out of five stars, noting a darker tone throughout the album, with songs such as “Lords Of Abbadon,” “Executioner’s Song” and “She’s An Anchor” earning comparisons to Down and Alice in Chains. Ultimate Guitar Archive commented that the album's music has "a bit of GN’R influence injected into it all, but [that] there’s just as much a heavy helping of punk and even 70’s glam" while they also complimented the lyrics stating they have "some fantastic moments." David Jón Fuller of the Winnipeg Free Press stated "it's clear McKagan hasn't lost any of his musical swagger" and while "his vocals are little more than shouting [...] the sound is powerful and bottom-heavy."

== Tracks ==
All tracks are written by Loaded.

No.	Title	Length
1.	"Lords of Abbadon"	3:25
2.	"Executioner's Song"	3:36
3.	"Dead Skin"	3:20
4.	"We Win"	4:04
5.	"Easier Lying"	4:05
6.	"She's an Anchor"	3:22
7.	"Indian Summer"	4:22
8.	"Wrecking Ball"	3:27
9.	"King of the World"	3:24
10.	"Cocaine"	4:14
11.	"Your Name"	3:18
12.	"Follow Me to Hell"	3:39

iTunes bonus track
No.	Title	Length
13.	"Cocaine" (acoustic)	4:08

Japanese Edition bonus tracks
No.	Title	Length
13.	"Cocaine" (acoustic)
14.	"Runaway" (acoustic)
15.	"King of the World" (acoustic)

Digital Edition bonus tracks
No.	Title	Length
13.	"Cocaine" (acoustic)
14.	"Lords of Abbadon" (instrumental)
15.	"We Win" (instrumental)
16.	"Easier Lying" (instrumental)
17.	"She's an Anchor" (instrumental)
18.	"Indian Summer" (instrumental)
19.	"Wrecking Ball" (instrumental)
20.	"King of the World" (instrumental)
21.	"Your Name" (instrumental)
22.	"Fight On"
23.	"Fight On" (instrumental)

== Personnel ==
Loaded

- Duff McKagan – lead vocals, rhythm guitar
- Isaac Carpenter – drums, percussion
- Jeff Rouse – bass guitar, backing vocals
- Mike Squires – lead guitar, backing vocals

Production

- Terry Date – production

== Charts ==
Chart (2011)	Peak Position
U.S. Billboard Top Heatseekers	12
