= Wasted Heart =

EP by Loaded
- Released: September 22, 2008
- Recorded: June 4–18, 2008, at Jupiter Studios, Seattle, Washington
- Genre: Hard rock, alternative rock, punk rock
- Length: 20:12
- Label: Century Media
- Producer: Martin Feveyear

Loaded chronology
Dark Days (2001)	Wasted Heart (2008)	Sick (2009)

Wasted Heart is the first EP, and third release overall, by American rock band Loaded.

== Background ==
Following Scott Weiland's departure from Velvet Revolver on April 21, 2008 Loaded decided to regroup and record a new full-length album, with Velvet Revolver being put on hiatus until a new singer was found. After a few jam sessions, Loaded began recording what would become Sick with Dark Days producer Martin Feveyear at Jupiter Studios in Seattle, Washington. After signing a deal with Century Media the band began performing under the moniker Duff McKagan's Loaded to help promote the band further.

Wasted Heart was released September 22, 2008 to coincide with their European Tour although it was available before the release date during the UK Tour. A music video for the song "No More" was shot to promote the EP.

All of the EP tracks were later featured on Loaded's second album Sick with the exception of the EP exclusive track "Executioner's Song" as well as "Wasted Heart" (the EP version is acoustic while the album version is electric). "Executioner's Song" was later re-recorded for the band's third album The Taking, released in 2011.

== Track listing ==
All tracks are written by Loaded, except "No More" by Trey Bruce and Duff McKagan.

No.	Title	Length
1.	"Sleaze Factory"	3:46
2.	"No More"	4:35
3.	"Executioner's Song"	3:39
4.	"IOU"	3:37
5.	"Wasted Heart" (Acoustic)	4:33

== Personnel ==
Loaded

- Duff McKagan – lead vocals, rhythm guitar
- Mike Squires – lead guitar, backing vocals
- Jeff Rouse – bass guitar, backing vocals
- Geoff Reading – drums, backing vocals

Production personnel

- Martin Feveyear– production, mixing, mastering, additional percussion
- Jon Ervie – mixing assistance
