= Lifter (band) =

American grunge trio

- Origin: Silver Lake, Los Angeles, California
- Genres: Grunge; alternative rock; post-punk
- Years active: 1992–1998; 2006; 2013
- Labels: Fingerpaint; Triple X; Boy's Life; Interscope
- Past members: Mike Coulter; Jeffrey Sebelia; John Rozas; Angie Scarpa
- Website: facecrime.com

Lifter was an American grunge band from Los Angeles, California. They are best known for their minor hit single "402", and more recently for the band's bassist Jeffrey Sebelia. Allmusic described the band as "the forgotten heroes of 90's teenage angst".

== History ==
=== 1992–1994: Independent releases ===
Lifter was formed by Jeffrey Sebelia and Mike Coulter, who met at a rehabilitation centre. After they both left, they added John Rozas, who Coulter had worked with six years before, and the band was formed. They then began performing around the Silverlake area of Los Angeles. The band released several singles during their independent years on Fingerpaint and Triple X Records, which helped the band establish a local fanbase.

=== 1994–1996: signing to Interscope and Melinda (Everything Was Beautiful and Nothing Hurt) ===
The band signed to Interscope Records in 1994. Before the band could commence work on a full-length release, Interscope sent Mike Coulter to rehab again to recover from his heroin and cocaine addictions before they would let the band record.

The band's major label debut, Melinda (Everything Was Beautiful and Nothing Hurt) was released in April 1996, and reached number 3 on the CMJ Top 75 Alternative Airplay chart. Titled after Coulter's ex-girlfriend, the album was lyrically inspired by Coulter's breakup with the aforementioned Melinda, and was written as a way for him to cope with the separation. Upon release, Melinda received positive reviews from critics, many who complimented the album's lyrics and musicianship. Keanu Reeves of Dogstar also chose the band and the album as one of his favourites of 1996.

The album was promoted with two music videos for "Headshot" (which was also released as a single) and "The Rich, Dark, Sultry Red of Hate", which were directed by Johnathan Craven, the son of A Nightmare on Elm Street director Wes Craven. "The Rich, Dark, Sultry Red of Hate" received some airplay on MTV's 120 Minutes, and the song "402" became a minor success after receiving airplay from Seattle radio station KNDD, though Interscope sent the station a cease-and-desist. Interscope did not release the song as a single, despite previously promising the band that it would.

Despite the positive reviews, and the minor success of "402", the album failed to bring about commercial success.

=== 1996–1998: Breakup ===
After the album's promotional cycle ended, Lifter went back to the studio with a new drummer, Angie Scarpa, and producer Bob Marlette. They produced five songs together at A&M Studios in 1998, which the band submitted to their label. After the label gave no response, the band believed the forthcoming release would not be promoted by the label, and asked to be let go from their contract, to which the label obliged.

The band broke soon after, though the separation was not acrimonious. "We played for a while, and then it just stopped", said Mike Coulter. In a 2006 interview, Coulter blamed the band's breakup on his disappointment with the album's failure, and him denying his interest in music as a result; "For a long time I wasn’t even able to listen to music. I hated it because it had broken my heart.”

=== 2004–2012: Brief reunions ===
In 2004, the band set up a website on the URL facecrime.com, which caused some confusion as the link was previously used by an At the Drive-In fan message board of the same name. The band released some mp3s of the band's 1998 demos, as well as some other demos from that period .

In 2006, Jeffrey Sebelia and Mike Coulter collaborated once again to record a song for Olympus Fashion Week, "Swing". Following this, Sebelia announced Lifter would record a new album, however, nothing ever materialised of this. There have been no updates to the band's website since 2006, and the band is considered defunct. In 2013, the band reunited to perform at a benefit concert for Denise Franco, alongside the Campfire Girls and Plexi.

=== Post-breakup activities ===
Since the band's breakup, the band's various members have done various activities.

Mike Coulter went on a long hiatus from the music industry. He released his first studio album in nearly 20 years, Saviors, on September 15, 2015, through Cautionary Tail Records. The album contains a re-recording one of Lifter's 1998 demos, "Calm Me Down".

Jeffrey Sebelia became a fashion designer, and went on to win the third season of Bravo series Project Runaway in 2006, despite his unpopularity with audiences for being hostile and allegations of cheating by one of the contestants, Laura Bennett.

== Appearances in other media ==
- The band and Mike Coulter were featured as part of ex-Bad Religion drummer John Albert's 2005 book "Wrecking Crew: The Really Bad News Griffith Park Pirates".
- "Swing" was featured as part of Jeffery Sebellia's runway show at the last show of Olympus Fashion Week in 2006.

== Band members ==
Final line-up

- Mike Coulter - vocals, guitar (1992-1998, 2006)
- Jeffrey Sebelia - bass (1992-1998, 2006)
- Angie Scarpa - drums (1996-1998)

Past members

- John Rozas - drums (1992-1996)

== Discography ==
=== Studio albums ===
Year	Title	Details
1996	Melinda (Everything Was Beautiful and Nothing Hurt)	Released: April 9, 1996; Label: Interscope; Format: CD, CS

=== Singles ===
Year	Title	Album
1993	"402 / Big & Tall"	non-album single
1994	"Nova / Shutout"	non-album single
1996	"Headshot"	Melinda (Everything Was Beautiful and Nothing Hurt)

=== Split releases ===
Year	Title	Details
1995	Lifter & Campfire Girls	Released: 1995; Label: Boy's Life/Fingerpaint; Format: 7", CD

=== Music videos ===
Title	Year	Director	Album
"The Rich, Dark, Sultry Red of Hate"	1995	Jonathan Craven, Mike Coulter	Melinda (Everything Was Beautiful and Nothing Hurt)
"Headshot"	1996	Jonathan Craven, Mike Coulter	Melinda (Everything Was Beautiful and Nothing Hurt)
