= Beautiful Disease =

Unreleased 1999 studio album by Duff McKagan

Studio album by Duff McKagan
- Released: Unreleased
- Recorded: 1998–1999
- Genres: Hard rock; punk rock
- Length: 47:55
- Label: Universal
- Producers: Duff McKagan; Noel Golden

Duff McKagan chronology
Believe in Me (1993)	Beautiful Disease (Unreleased)	Tenderness (2019)

Beautiful Disease is an unreleased solo album by Guns N' Roses bassist Duff McKagan which was slated to be released as his second solo album in 1999. However, it was shelved after a merger between McKagan's parent label Polygram and Universal, and McKagan lost the rights to release it.

== Overview ==
The album was recorded through 1998 in Duff McKagan's home studio. McKagan handled most of the vocals and instruments, with contributions from a few guests: Mike Bordin, Michael Barragan, Abe Laboriel Jr. and ex-Guns N' Roses members Slash and Izzy Stradlin. Beautiful Disease included new versions of the songs "Seattlehead" and "Mezz" that were previously featured on releases of Duff McKagan's previous bands, Neurotic Outsiders and 10 Minute Warning respectively.

The album was planned for release on Duff McKagan's birthday, February 5, 1999. The promotional campaign for the album was started by Geffen Records with promo copies being distributed to radio stations and for critical reviews. During the same time, a merger between Polygram and Universal occurred and Geffen was merged with A&M Records into Interscope. Several planned albums were postponed indefinitely, including McKagan's album.

Nevertheless, McKagan went on tour in support of the album putting up a band with Dez Cadena of Black Flag, Taz Bentley of the Burden Brothers and Michael Barragan of Plexi.

During the tour McKagan came up with the idea to release a live album that would include the unreleased material. This resulted in Loaded's Episode 1999: Live live album that featured six songs from Beautiful Disease: "Seattlehead", "Superman", "Shinin' Down", "Missing You", "Then and Now" and "Mezz".

The songs "Seattlehead", "Superman", and "Then and Now" were eventually re-recorded and released on Loaded's debut studio album Dark Days.

In 2023, McKagan's manager managed to acquire the rights and master tapes to Beautiful Disease, leading to the inclusion of a new mix of "Hope" (with newly recorded vocals) on McKagan's 2023 album Lighthouse, including the original performances from Slash and Abe Laboriel Jr.

Despite McKagan obtaining the legal rights to Beautiful Disease, no mention has been made of an official release.

== Track listing ==
All songs written by Duff McKagan, except where noted.

1. "Seattlehead" – 4:17
2. "Who's to Blame" – 2:06
3. "Superman" – 3:12
4. "Song for Beverly" – 4:33
5. "Put You Back" (Duff McKagan, Izzy Stradlin) – 3:24
6. "Shinin' Down" (Al Bloch) – 2:54
7. "Missing You" (Duff McKagan, Michael Barragan) – 4:52
8. "Hope" – 4:32
9. "Holiday" (Al Bloch) – 2:22
10. "Then and Now" (Duff McKagan, Paul Solger) – 4:10
11. "Rain" – 4:17
12. "Beautiful Disease" (Duff McKagan, Eddie Hewlett) – 2:43
13. "Mezz" – 4:42

== Personnel ==
=== Studio personnel ===
- Duff McKagan – vocals, bass guitar, guitar, drums

=== Additional personnel ===
- Slash – lead guitar on "Hope" and "Mezz"
- Izzy Stradlin – rhythm guitar on "Put You Back"
- Mike Bordin – drums
- Michael Barragan – rhythm guitar on "Missing You", "Who's to Blame" and "Then and Now", Moog Prodigy on "Missing You"
- Norm Block – drums on "Missing You", "Who's to Blame" and "Then and Now"
