= The Girls (Seattle band) =

- Origin: Seattle, Washington
- Genres: Pop punk, glam punk, new wave
- Years active: Early 2000s–present
- Label: Dirtnap
- Members: Shannon Brown, Vas Kumar, Zache Davis, Colin Griffiths, Derek Mason, Elie Goral
- Past members: Rick Way, Dana Turner, Steve E. Nix, Nick Markel, Eric Nordlund, Mario M, Thomas Burke

The Girls are a new wave/punk pop band from Seattle, Washington that formed in the early 2000s. As of 2012, their members are lead vocalist/frontman Shannon Brown, guitarists Zache Davis and Vas Kumar, bassist Colin Griffiths, keyboardist Derek Mason, and drummer Elie Goral. Their sound has been compared to that of multiple '70's bands, including the Cars and the Voidoids.

== History ==
The Girls released their self-titled debut album in 2004 on Dirtnap Records, and they performed at the Bumbershoot music festival that same year. Soon afterward, the band fell apart, and every member left except Brown. In 2006, the band returned with Brown and an otherwise new lineup, and their second album, the Martin Feveyear-engineered Yes No Yes No Yes No, was released on Dirtnap Records in 2008. they were named one of SPIN.com’s Top 5 Up-and-Coming Seattle Bands, and on August 28th, 2008 were featured as SPIN.com's band of the day. To promote the album, they returned to that year's Bumbershoot on August 30.

Their song "Where Wolves Drink" was featured in the 2010 EA Black box game, Skate 3.

== Name ==
Despite their name, the Girls' members are all men, which has led to some guests to their shows being surprised that they are not an all-female band. Of these guests, Brown has said, "Dudes like that come out of the woodwork for that all-girl shit."

== Critical reception ==
Brian Howe of Pitchfork Media gave the Girls' self-titled debut album a 7.0 out of 10 rating. In his review, he wrote that the album was "no fishnet-hawking electroclash fashionista rock; besides having more sexxx appeal than both Coreys combined, The Girls've got chops like Ralph Macchio." OverDefined, writing for Punknews.org, gave Yes No Yes No Yes No a highly negative review, writing that the band "just sound like stylistic posturing and it does nothing for me" and giving the album 1 star out of 5.

== Discography ==
- The Girls (Dirtnap, 2004)
- Yes No Yes No Yes No (Dirtnap, 2008)
