= Dark Days (Loaded album) =

Studio album by Loaded
- Released: (United States) July 2001 (Japan) July 11, 2001 (Europe) July 29, 2002 (United States) February 2008 (reissue)
- Recorded: December 2000–February 2001 at Jupiter Studios, Seattle, Washington
- Genre: Hard rock, alternative rock, punk rock
- Length: 48:28
- Label: Self-released (US); Toshiba EMI (Japan); Locomotive (Europe); Pimp (reissue)
- Producer: Martin Feveyear, Loaded

Loaded chronology
Episode 1999: Live (1999)	Dark Days (2001)	Wasted Heart (2008)

Alternative Cover

Dark Days is the debut studio album by American rock band Loaded. Recorded between December 2000 and February 2001 at Jupiter Studios in Seattle, Washington, it was self-released in July 2001.

== History ==
In 2000, Duff began re-recording some of the songs from Beautiful Disease ("Seattlehead", "Then and Now" and "Superman"), as well as new material at Jupiter Studios in Seattle, Washington. For recording, he brought in drummer Geoff Reading formerly of Green Apple Quick Step and New American Shame, guitarist Dave Dederer formerly of The Presidents of the United States of America and producer Martin Feveyear who also performed keyboards on the album. Duff performed the bass on all tracks as well as guitar and the piano on the song "Misery". Former Nevada Bachelors and Harvey Danger guitarist Mike Squires was also invited to record additional guitar parts on the album. In June, 2001, Duff announced that the album would be titled Dark Days and that it would be released under the moniker Loaded rather than using his own name for the project.

== Release and promotion ==
Dark Days was released in the US and Japan in July, 2001. It was later released in Europe in July, 2002.

Loaded announced three dates at the House of Blues taking place in Anaheim, California, Las Vegas, Nevada and West Hollywood, California in November 2001. To perform at these shows, Mike Squires was added as the group's lead guitarist and when Duff took up the second guitar position, Alien Crime Syndicate bassist Jeff Rouse joined the group. Additional US dates were announced for 2002 as well as a tour in Japan. European tour followed in summer of 2002.

The album was reissued in February 2008 by Pimp Records on both CD and digital download formats, with a limited-edition version with the bonus live tracks from the band's 2002 tour of Japan available exclusively at CDBaby.

== Track listing ==
All tracks are written by Duff McKagan.

No.	Title	Length
1.	"Seattle Head"	3:48
2.	"Then & Now"	3:15
3.	"Wrap My Arms"	4:02
4.	"Dark Days"	3:51
5.	"Want To"	4:53
6.	"Misery"	3:37
7.	"Criminal"	5:09
8.	"Queen Joanasophina"	3:29
9.	"Shallow"	4:06
10.	"Superman"	3:32
11.	"King of Downtown"	3:29
12.	"Your Way"	5:18

2008 reissue bonus tracks, Live at Tokyo's Tower Records
No.	Title	Length
1.	"Live Intro"	0:26
2.	"Attitude" (Misfits cover)	1:27
3.	"Then and Now"	3:12
4.	"Wrap My Arms"	3:52
5.	"Superman"	3:22
6.	"Criminal"	5:16
7.	"Queen Joanasophina"	4:25
8.	"Misery"	5:53
9.	"King of Downtown"	3:20
10.	"Want To"	4:35
11.	"Dark Days"	5:37
12.	"Seattlehead"	3:47
13.	"I Wanna Be Your Dog" (The Stooges cover)	3:51
14.	"Raw Power" (The Stooges cover)	6:27
15.	"Punk Rock Song" (from Duff McKagan's Believe in Me)	2:11

== Personnel ==
- Duff McKagan – lead vocals, bass guitar, guitar, piano on "Misery", production
- Dave Dederer – guitar, production
- Geoff Reading – drums, backing vocals, percussion, production
- Martin Feveyear – keyboards, backing vocals, production

Additional personnel

- Mike Squires – additional guitars
- Jon Irvie – engineering
- Mike Easton – engineering
- Dave Colins – mastering

== See also ==
- Beautiful Disease
