= Seattlehead =

Song by Loaded

from the album Dark Days
- Released: July 2001
- Recorded: December 2000–February 2001 at Jupiter Studios, Seattle, Washington
- Genre: Hard rock, punk rock
- Length: 3:48
- Label: Pimp
- Songwriter(s): Duff McKagan
- Producer(s): Martin Feveyear

"Seattlehead" (also typeset Seattle Head) is a song written by American musician Duff McKagan. It is best known as a song by his band Loaded, from their album Dark Days; it also featured on earlier releases by Neurotic Outsiders as well as McKagan's unreleased solo album Beautiful Disease.

== Composition ==
The song was originally written in the early 1990s, with its subject matter being "what L.A. came to represent, rather than what it is". It also references McKagan's move to Los Angeles from Seattle in 1984 with the lyrics: "Movin' to the city sight unseen/19 years of age I'm packing my bags/Hollywood was all the rage/I came to you in 1984/You showed me in, then you shut the door."

== Releases ==
The first version of the song was released as the B-side of the 1996 single "Jerk" by the supergroup Neurotic Outsiders, featuring McKagan, Guns N' Roses bandmate Matt Sorum, Sex Pistols guitarist Steve Jones and Duran Duran bassist John Taylor. It also featured on the Angelina EP released in Japan in 1997. This early version featured a shorter first verse than the later releases.

"Seattlehead" was later re-recorded for McKagan's second solo album Beautiful Disease, which was ultimately shelved after Geffen and Interscope Records merged. McKagan was dropped from the roster of the "new combined" label.

After the cancellation of the release of Beautiful Disease, McKagan decided to make a live release featuring new songs, which resulted in the release of Loaded's live album Episode 1999: Live including a live version of the song. McKagan began re-recording some of the songs from Beautiful Disease such as "Seattlehead" as well as new material at Jupiter Studios in Seattle for Loaded's debut studio album: Dark Days, released in the U.S. and Japan in July 2001 and in Europe in July 2002.

A 2001 music video by Eric Waggoner featuring clips of the band performing live in Japan was made available on Loaded's YouTube page in 2008.
