= Mike Squires (musician) =

American guitarist (born 1971)

- Squires performing with Ugly Kid Joe in 2024

Background information
- Born: December 28, 1971 (age 54); Concord, California, U.S.
- Genres: Pop rock, hard rock, punk rock, alternative rock
- Occupation: Guitarist
- Years active: 1993–present
- Labels: PopLlama, Barsuk, V2, The Control Group, Century Media, Eagle Rock Entertainment

Mike Squires (born December 28, 1971) is an American musician best known as the lead guitarist in the hard rock group Loaded, the group led by Velvet Revolver and Guns N' Roses bassist Duff McKagan.

Previously, he was a member of a number of Seattle-based groups such as Eat the Feeling, Nevada Bachelors, Harvey Danger, Alien Crime Syndicate and The Long Winters which featured former members of The Western State Hurricanes, Harvey Danger and Death Cab for Cutie among others. He also performed with Green Apple Quick Step for a number of "reunion" shows alternating between guitar and bass.

== Biography ==
=== Early years ===
Squires was born in Concord, California on December 28, 1971. He moved around frequently as a child, attending various grade schools before eventually settling in Granite Falls, Washington. He joined the Marines before eventually moving to Seattle, Washington.

=== Early music career (1993–1996) ===
During his early career, Squires formed or joined a number of groups but with little or no releases. One of his first musical ventures was a jam band named Eat the Feeling, where he played bass; they recorded a CD in 1993 which was released in 1994. Next was the Minutemen influenced group, Compass, where they recorded a few demos, and Suttree, a Country/pop influenced group. Squires and Darius Minwalla, future drummer for The Posies, attempted to put a band together, recording demos in the process, however they eventually moved on to other projects.

=== Nevada Bachelors (1997–2000) ===
In 1997, Squires joined the Nevada Bachelors, a group formed by Robb Benson. The band's lineup was rounded up by bassist Ben Brunn and drummer Dusty Hayes. They released debut album Carrots & So On in 1998 through Pop Llama Records with a sound reminiscent of The Police. They toured in support of the album and played shows in their native Seattle supporting Death Cab for Cutie in 1998 and Fountains of Wayne in 1999. The presidents of the United States of America drummer Jason Finn joined the group replacing Dusty Hayes. The group recorded and released their second and last album Hello Jupiter in 2000 and toured in support.

=== Harvey Danger (2000–2001) ===
After taking some time off following the success of their previous album and the single "Flagpole Sitta", Harvey Danger decided to regroup and record the follow-up to Where Have All the Merrymakers Gone? with the result being King James Version released in September 2000. For the album's supporting tour, Squires was added as the group's live guitarist as well as The Western State Hurricanes founder John Roderick on keyboard. During his time in the group, Squires recorded some demos with the band however they remain unreleased.

=== The Long Winters (2002, 2005–2006) ===
Squires contributed guitar and bass tracks for The Long Winters first record, The Worst You Can Do Is Harm, on the track "Scent of Lime", however his strict conditions of his parole at the time, as well his involvement with other bands, prohibited him from joining the band until 2005 where he played with the group for less than a year before departing.

=== Loaded (2002, 2006, 2008–present) ===
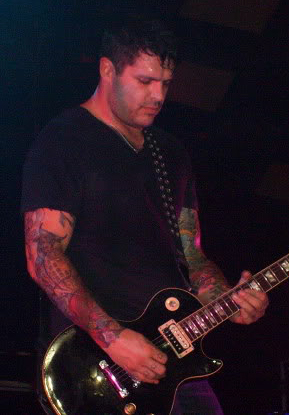
Squires performing with Loaded at the Glasgow Barrowlands in October 2009 supporting Black Stone Cherry

While recording for The Long Winters, Squires added additional guitar parts for Loaded's debut album Dark Days, with Duff McKagan, Geoff Reading and Dave Dederer, which was released in the United States and Japan in July 2001. It was later released in Europe in July 2002. Loaded announced three dates at the House of Blues taking place in Anaheim, California, Las Vegas, Nevada and West Hollywood, California in November. Before these shows, Squires officially joined the group as lead guitarist and was joined by Alien Crime Syndicate bassist Jeff Rouse. In January 2002, Loaded announced a string of dates in the United States and Japan. During one of the shows, in Los Angeles, Loaded were joined onstage by The Cult duo Billy Duffy and Matt Sorum, also formerly of Guns N' Roses. After these shows, Squires left Loaded to join bandmate Rouse in Alien Crime Syndicate and was replaced by former Wasted Youth and Electric Love Hogs guitarist Dave Kushner. When Loaded went on a semi-hiatus, still playing shows occasionally, following the formation of Velvet Revolver both Squires and Rouse returned to the group.

In December 2006, the group reunited for a special benefit show for Jerry Allen's Cancer Fund. Supporting Loaded that night were Top Heavy Crush and Jeff Angell of Post Stardom Depression.

In February 2008, while on tour with Velvet Revolver, McKagan announced that Loaded were planning on releasing a new album in the summer. During the United Kingdom leg of Velvet Revolver's tour in April, McKagan stated that Loaded were to enter the studio in late April. After a few jam sessions, Loaded began recording what would become Sick with Dark Days producer Martin Feveyear at Jupiter Studios in Seattle. They released a series of Webisodes during this time featuring footage from the recording sessions for the group's new album which was completed in less than 2 weeks. After signing a deal with Century Media, the band changed their moniker to Duff McKagan's Loaded to help promote the band further and an EP, Wasted Heart, was released September 22, 2008 to coincide with their European Tour. Sick was released on March 20, 2009 in Europe and April 7, 2009 in the United States where it placed at number 43 on the Billboard Heatseekers Chart selling 1,400 copies. Loaded toured in support of Sick playing dates in the United States and appearing at several European festivals such as Download in the United Kingdom, Rock AM/IM in Germany and they also supported Mötley Crüe on their European tour. The band continued to tour and were announced as the main support for Black Stone Cherry, along with New Jersey group The Parlor Mob, during their tour of Europe and the United Kingdom.

On July 4, 2010, the band announced they were to begin pre-production and enter the studio in August to record the follow-up to Sick stating:

'We have been writing for the last few months and next week we start pre-production on the new Loaded record! We couldn't be happier and we think you fuckers will be, too! As it is looking, we will be recording it in August and thus begins Loaded Mach III!'

In August, it was announced that the group were to record their new album with producer Terry Date, whose production credits include albums by Soundgarden, Pantera and Deftones among others.

On September 2, it was announced that the album was completed and that the group were looking for a label. McKagan also stated that it was Date that approached the group about producing their new album.

=== Alien Crime Syndicate (2002–2003) ===
After Alien Crime Syndicate regrouped, Squires successfully auditioned for the position of second guitarist. They recorded the album XL from Coast to Coast in 2002 released through Nabil Ayers' label The Control Group (which was then picked up and released by V2). The album featured a Japanese bonus track cover off Elton John's "Don't Go Breaking My Heart" recorded with Duff McKagan and Kim Warnick, and toured in support of the album. Squires left the band sometime before the recording of Ten Songs in the Key of Betrayal.

=== Ugly Kid Joe (2022) ===
Squires filled in for Ugly Kid Joe's rhythm guitarist Dave Fortman for the 2022 European tour of the spring and early summer legs, in support of its fifth album Rad Wings of Destiny, but switched to bass guitar in place of Cordell Crockett since 2023 when Fortman himself returned to the band for North American leg of the tour that year only to be filled in for afterwards by Ghost guitarist Chris Catalyst.

=== Peter Hook & the Light (2022) ===
With a short reprieve from the Ugly Kid Joe Tour, Squires was tapped to fill bassist Jack Bates' shoes in Peter Hook & the Light when he left to perform on tour with the Smashing Pumpkins. Of note, Squires had but a 2 week period to learn 43 songs on bass before joining Peter Hook on a UK and North American tour.

=== Couch Riffs (2018–present) ===
The Couch Riffs Podcast is hosted by musician Mike Squires and features a variety of musical guests of all backgrounds and styles. Squires and the guests converse on his living room couch (sometimes on location) then perform a "first take only" version of a song of their choice. Guests have included Duff Mckagan, Ryan Roxie, Vivian Campbell, Alex Skolnick, Joe Reineke, Buckcherry, Walking Papers, Eric Howk, Nabil Ayers and Jared James Nichols. The podcast is found on all podcasting providers and live performances on YouTube and social media channels.

On August 21, 2020 Couch Riffs released a video of Rod Stewart's "Young Turks" featuring Alice In Chains’ William DuVall (vocals), The Killers’ Ronnie Vannucci (drums), Afghan Whigs’ Jon Skibic (guitar), The Shins’ Mark Watrous (keys), Dragged Under’s Ryan “Fluff” Bruce (guitar) and Mike Squires on bass. Metal Insider named it one of the top 5 videos of quarantine.

=== Other work ===
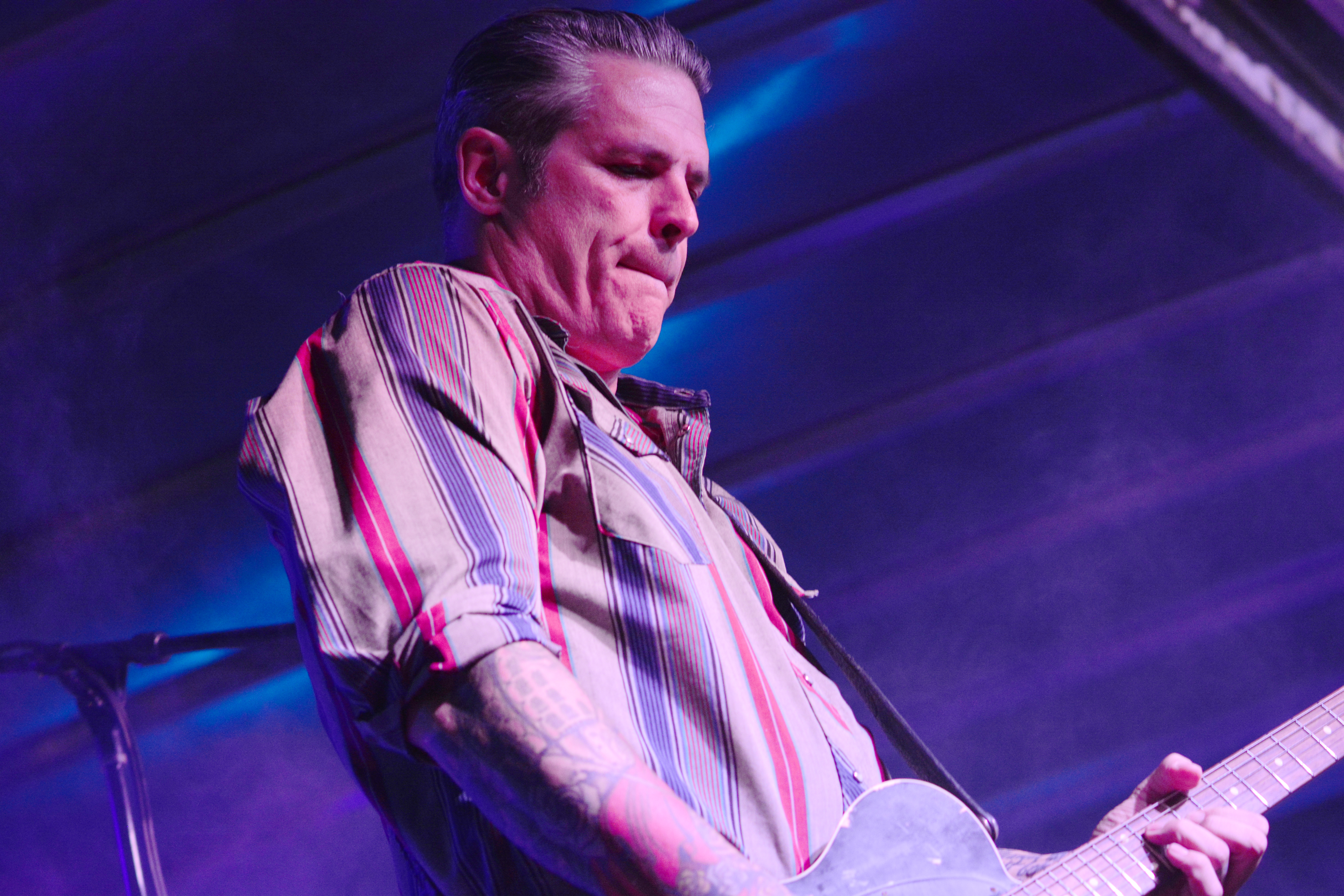
2024 in Seattle with The Long Winters.

Squires was briefly a member of the group The Burning Rivers, with Ben London, but left after his move to Portland, Oregon, he became part of Lael Alderman's band. Squires also did some guitar tech work for The presidents of the United States of America and Mindless Self-Indulgence while he also worked at CD Baby and for an independent Portland based music label, Badman Recording Co.

On March 26, 2010, Squires performed with Green Apple Quick Step, whose lineup consisted of members Tyler Willman, Dana Turner, Leif Andersen along with singer Christa Wells and Squires's former Loaded bandmate Geoff Reading, at the Hell's Kitchen in Tacoma, Washington.

During the years of 2011-2014 Mike taught private guitar at The Guitar Store in Seattle.

== Discography ==
Title	Release	Label	Band
The Stunstanstunstun Session	1994		Eat the Feeling
Carrots & So On	1998	Pop Llama	Nevada Bachelors
Hello Jupiter	2000	Pop Llama	Nevada Bachelors
The Worst You Can Do Is Harm	2002	Barsuk	The Long Winters
XL from Coast to Coast	2002	The Control Group/V2	Alien Crime Syndicate
Dark Days	2002	Pimp	Loaded
Wasted Heart	2008	Century Media	Loaded
Sick	2009	Century Media	Loaded
The Taking	2011	Eagle Rock Entertainment	Loaded
