= The Village Green (band) =

American indie rock band

- Origin: Portland, Oregon
- Genre: Indie rock
- Years active: 2004–2012
- Label: spinART
- Members: J. Nicholas Allard; Jeremy Sherrer; Dave Depper; Nathan Junior
- Past members: Jon Almendarez; Dusty Springfield

The Village Green is a Portland, Oregon indie rock band, composed of lead vocalist/guitarist/composer J. Nicholas Allard and drummer/producer/back-up vocalist Jeremy Sherrer, bassist/back-up vocalist Dave Depper, and lead guitarist/back-up vocalist Nathan Junior. The band reformed in 2012.

== Discography ==
- The Village Green (2005) Hidden Peak Records
- Feeling the Fall (2006) spinART Records
- When the Creepers Creep In (EP/ Single) (2006)
- Live on KEXP.org EP (2006)
- "TVG (Untitled)" (2012)
