= Campfire Girls (band) =

American rock band

- Also known as: Cämpfire Girls
- Origin: Hollywood, U.S.
- Genres: Alternative rock
- Years active: 1993–1995; 1998; 2001–2004; 2019–present
- Labels: Interscope; Boy's Life; Birdman
- Members: Christian Stone; Jon Pikus; Andrew Clark
- Past members: Mike Semple; Kellii Scott

Campfire Girls is a U.S. rock band from Los Angeles, California. The band formed in 1993 in Hollywood, California.

== Band History ==
=== Original years ===
The Campfire Girls formed in 1993, shortly after Christian Stone moved from Massachusetts to California and met Pikus at the Miracle Mile district. The band later moved to DeLongpre, east of Highland. and met Andrew Clark thanks to Casey Nicolli, a close friend of Stone's.

Less than a year after forming, in 1994, the band self-released a 3-song EP Sad Dog · Little Wolverine · Post-Coital, on their own label, Boy's Life Records. The EP sparked a major label bidding war, which ultimately led to the band signing a three-album deal with Interscope Records, who gave them a $350,000 advance, a home recording studio worth $150,000 and distribution for Boy's Life Records. This deal would lead to the release of an EP, Mood Enhancer (1995). The band then attempted to record their debut album, DeLongpre, however the band's recorded and live performances were growing increasingly worse by their growing addictions to heroin, which had started around the time they entered the studio, and the album was ultimately shelved by Interscope. In the fall of 1995, after the band members had a physical fight over Pikus (the only relatively clean member of the group) wanting Stone and Clark to go to rehab, Pikus was fired. The band attempted to tour, but eventually disbanded at the end of the year.

The band briefly reformed in 1998 to record an EP, Rainy Day, which included two new songs.

=== Reformation ===
Years later, the band re-emerged, thanks to the encouragement of Scott Weiland and his brother, Michael, who Stone had been working with as a bartender at a West Hollywood coffee shop. They initially recorded some songs for them, with the intention being that the band would record a full-length for the Weiland's newly formed label, Lavish Records; ultimately, the band re-signed to Interscope in 2001 thanks to a connection with A&R manager Mark Williams, who had attempted to sign the band to Virgin Records in 1994. As part of the deal, the band received the masters to DeLongpre, which was released on Birdman Records in October 2002.

They eventually released a second studio album, Tell Them Hi, later that year before appearing at Lollapalooza in 2003. The album received some critical praise, but their popularity did not increase.

The band has since reunited for some shows in 2019 and 2020.

== Members ==
- Christian Stone - vocals, guitar (1993-1995, 1998, 2001–2004, 2019-present)
- Andrew Clark - bass (1993-1995, 1998, 2001–2004, 2019-present)
- Jon Pikus - drums (1993-1995, 1998, 2019–present)

Past Members

- Mike Semple - guitar (2003-2004)
- Kellii Scott - drums (2003-2004)

== Discography ==
=== Studio albums ===
Year	Title	Details
2002	DeLongpre	Released: October 15, 2002; Label: Birdman; Formats: CD
2003	Tell Them Hi	Released:October 14, 2003; Label: Interscope; Formats: CD

=== EPs ===
Year	Title	Details
1994	Sad Dog · Little Wolverine · Post-Coital	Released: 1994; Label: Boy's Life; Formats: CD, 7"
1995	Mood Enhancer	Released: September 15, 1995; Label: Interscope/Boy's Life; Formats: CD, CS, 10-inch LP
1998	Rainy Day	Released: 1998; Label: Boy's Life; Formats: CD

=== Split releases ===
Year	Title	Details
1995	Lifter & Campfire Girls	Released: 1995; Label: Boy's Life/Fingerpaint; Format: 7", CD
