= Martin Feveyear =

- Born: 1966 (age 59–60)
- Origin: Hadleigh, Suffolk, England, UK
- Occupations: Record producer, audio engineer, audio mixer, musician, Mastering
- Years active: 1993–present
- Labels: Restless, Warner Bros., Century Media, Epic, Sub Pop, XL, Beggars Banquet, EMI, Roadrunner, Secretly Canadian

Martin John Feveyear (born late 1966) is a British record producer and audio engineer based in Seattle, Washington. Beginning as a singer-songwriter and musician, Feveyear soon began recording work for artists in both the UK and US before moving to Seattle at the age of 25. Together with Christian Fulghum (former bassist for Sister Psychic), he opened Jupiter Studios in Seattle in 1996. He has since worked with artists and groups — producing, engineering, arranging, mixing, mastering and additional instruments — such as Mark Lanegan, Mudhoney, Duff McKagan's Loaded, Kings of Leon, The Presidents of the United States of America, Queens of the Stone Age, Amber Pacific, Jesse Sykes, Sirens Sister, Green Apple Quick Step, Nevada Bachelors, The Minus 5, and Brandi Carlile, among others.

Through 2008 and 2009, Feveyear toured with Duff McKagan's Loaded, after producing the releases Wasted Heart and Sick, as the group's tour manager and sound engineer during live shows. Currently owns a Mastering studio.

== Credits ==
Release	Title	Label	Artist/Group	Credits
1993–97	Life Between Cigarettes		Danger Gens	Producer, engineer
1993–97	Man Downstairs		The West Section Line	Engineer, Mixing
1993–97	This Is Jennie		Micro Mini	Producer, engineer, Mixing
1993–97	Your Vile Disposition		Dreaming I Am	Producer, Engineer, Mixing
1993–97	Far Cry		Various Artists	Engineer
1993–97	In Defense of Animals		Various Artists	Producer
1993–97	Kingpin Original Soundtrack		Various Artists	Producer, engineer, Mixing
1993–97	Subject to Change: Artists for a Hate-Free America	BWL	Various Artists	Engineer, Mixing
1993–97	Snatch It Back and Hold It	BWL	Model Rockets	Producer, engineer, Mixing
1993–97	"Ludes And Cherrybombs"	The Medicine Label	Green Apple Quick Step	Producer, engineer, Mixing
1993–97	Surrender, You Freak!	Restless	Sister Psychic	Producer, engineer, Mixing
1993–97	Bloodless Coup / Unmoved 7"	Triangle Bullet Lines Rec. Co.	Popstar Assassins	Producer, Engineer, Mixing
1993–97	Famous	Warner Bros.	Super Deluxe	Producer, engineer, Mixing
1993–97	Via Satellite	Warner Bros.	Super Deluxe	Producer
1998	"I'm a Disco Dancer"(Remix)	Beggars Banquet/XL	Cornershop	Mixing
1998	Valis/Kitty Kitty	Man's Ruin	Valis/Kitty Kitty	Backing Vocals, producer, engineer, Mixing
1998	Trading with the Enemy	Epic	Tuatara	Engineer
1998	"Stay"	Sub Pop	Mark Lanegan	Producer, EngineerGary
1998	Serious Machine		Lead Pipe Cinch	Producer, engineer, Mixing
1998	Hope It Dies on a Sunny Day		The Delusions	Mastering
1998	Get in the Go Go Cage		Micro Mini	Engineer
1998	Huge Space Bird		BWL	Producer, engineer, Mixing
1999	I'll Take Care of You	Sub Pop	Mark Lanegan	Producer, Organ, Percussion, Piano, engineer, Mixing, Wurlitzer
1999	Dark Fantastic	Up	The Dark Fantastic	Producer, Percussion, Keyboards, Backing Vocals, Engineering, Mastering, Mixing
1999	Limitless Luxury		Mach 1.5	Piano, arranger, Drums, Keyboards, producer, engineer, Mixing
1999	Grasshopper's Dream	Sub Pop	Gary Lee Conner	Producer
1999	Shock-No-Par	Up	Octant	Mixing
2000	Nowhere Near Here		Alex Woodard	Percussion, Keyboards, Backing Vocals, Production, Engineering, Mastering, Mixing
2000	Ruston Mire		Flying Cars	Engineer, Mixing, Mastering
2000	Suicide	EMI	Sweet Water	Arranger, engineer, Mixing, Pre-Production
2000	Hello Jupiter	PopLlama	Nevada Bachelors	Producer
2000	Freaked Out and Small	Musicblitz	The presidents of the United States of America	Producer, engineer, Mixing
2000	"Tiny Explosions"	Roadrunner	The presidents of the United States of America	Producer, engineer, Mixing
2000	Confessions of St. Ace	Mammoth	John Wesley Harding	Engineer, Mixing
2000	Backseat Memoirs	GoodInk	The Pin-Ups	Synthesizer, Production, Engineering, Mellotron, Mastering, Mixing
2000	Fury	Sub Pop	The Ruby Doe	Producer, engineer, Mixing, Mastering
2001	Field Songs	Sub Pop	Mark Lanegan	Organ, engineer, Backing Vocals, Mastering, Mixing
2001	Goodbye Crooked Scar	Up	The Dark Fantastic	Producer, engineer, Mixing
2001	Hit After Hit	Dirtnap	The Briefs	Producer, engineer, Mixing, Mastering
2001	Epoxies	Dirtnap	Epoxies	Producer, engineer
2001	Vintage Slide Collections from Seattle, Vol 1	Bar/None	Trachtenburg Family Slideshow Players	Producer, engineer, Mixing
2001	Unbelievably Unbroken		Stephanie Schneiderman	Producer, engineer, Mixing, Rhodes
2001	Had		Had	Mastering
2001	The Robin Sings		Common Heroes	Producer, engineer, Mixing
2001	Crossing with Switchblades		Scared of Chaka	Mastering
2001	In Between	Sub Pop	Rosie Thomas	Producer, engineer, Mastering, Mixing
2002	Saturn Returns		Alex Woodard	Percussion, Backing Vocals, producer, engineer, Mastering, Mixing
2002	Window to the Wise		Jill Cohn	Keyboards
2002	Real Tuff: Durable Plastic		Rotten Apples	Synthesizer, Backing Vocals, Mastering, Mixing
2002	Since We've Become Translucent	Sub Pop	Mudhoney	Backing Vocals, engineer, Mixing
2002	When We Were Small	Sub Pop	Rosie Thomas	Producer, engineer, Mastering, Mixing
2002	Sevas Tra	Capitol	Otep	Engineer, Digital Editing
2002	Dark Days	EMI	Loaded	Producer, engineer, Mixing, Keyboards, Backing Vocals
2003	Let the War Against Music Begin	Mammoth	The Minus 5	Engineering, Mixing
2003	Off the Charts	Dirtnap	The Briefs	Producer, engineer, Mixing, Mastering
2003	Only With Laughter	Sub Pop	Rosie Thomas	Producer, engineer, Mixing
2003	Golden Age of Piracy		The Skulls	Producer, engineer, Mastering, Mixing
2003	Where Shall You Take Me?	Secretly Canadian	Damien Jurado	Mastering
2003	Ordinary Miracles	The Control Group	Post Stardom Depression	Producer, engineer
2003	Driving Straight Up in Siam		Ruston Mire	Mixing, Mastering
2003	Dream Engine Blue		The Ruby Doe	Producer, engineer, Mixing, Mastering
2004	These Things We Say		Ms. Led	Producer, engineer, Mastering, Mixing
2004	Light Returns		Old Ghost	Mastering, Mixing
2004	Night of the Living Skulls		The Skulls	Producer, engineer, Mixing, Mastering
2004	Lights Out		One Time Through	Producer, engineer, Mastering, Mixing
2004	Brighter When		Marc Olsen	Mastering
2004	Love Everybody	PUSA Inc.	The presidents of the United States of America	Producer, engineer, Mixing
2004	In Rock	Yep Roc	The Minus 5	Engineer, Mixing
2004	Fading Days	Hopeless	Amber Pacific	Producer, engineer, Mixing, Mastering
2005	The Possibility and the Promise	Hopeless	Amber Pacific	Producer, engineer, Mixing
2005	Weight of the World	Hopeless	Nural	Mixing, Percussion
2005	Time Can't Wait	Wax Orchard	Novatone	Producer, engineer, Mixing
2005	Seven Year Surrender	Box of Beanies	Jill Cohn	Producer, engineer, Mixing, Mastering, Backing Vocals, Percussion
2005	Live Airwaves	Magic Bullet	Cave In	Engineer, Mixing
2005	Three	Book	Hugespacebird	Mixing
2005	Teen Dance Ordinance	Warner Bros./London	A	Engineer
2005	Brandi Carlile	Columbia	Brandi Carlile	Mixing
2005	Stop the Future	Fat Wreck Chords	Epoxies	Producer, engineer, Mixing
2005	Dignity and Shame	Merge	Crooked Fingers	Producer, engineer, Mixing
2005	The Gifted Program	Made in Mexico	The Divorce	Producer, engineer, Mixing
2005	Neon & Ruin	Mount Fuji	Slender Means	Producer, engineer, Mixing
2005	Reed	Forthcoming	Reed	Producer, engineer, Mixing, Percussion
2005	Peter Pan Speedrock		Zeke/Peter Pan Speedrock	Producer, engineer, Mixing, Percussion
2005	In The Deep		The Hope	Producer, engineer, Mixing, Mastering, Backing Vocals, Percussion
2005	Half Acre Day		Half Acre Day	Mastering, Mixing
2005	Live	Arista/RCA	Kings of Leon	Engineer, Mixing
2005	On My Way to Absence	Secretly Canadian	Damien Jurado	Mixing
2005	The Girls	Dirtnap	The Girls	Producer, engineer, Mixing
2006	Synthesized	Fat Wreck Chords	Epoxies	Producer, engineer, Mixing
2006	To the Races	Saddle Creek	Eric Bachmann	Additional Recording, Mixing, Mastering
2006	Love and War	Skybucket	Barton Carroll	Mastering
2006	Common Market	Mass Line	Common Market	Mixing
2006	Outgoing Behavior	Suicide Squeeze	Crystal Skulls	Engineer, Mixing
2006	4	Hot Stack	Memphis Radio Kings	Producer, engineer, Mixing
2006	Best Friends Our Worst Enemies	Hopeless	Royden	Mixing
2006	City Morning Song	Minty Fresh	Sarah Shannon	Producer, engineer, Mixing, Mastering, Backing Vocals
2006	In the Veins	Shim	Shim	Producer, engineer, Mixing, Mastering
2006	Echoes from the Ocean Floor	The Control Group	Sirens Sister	Producer, engineer, Mixing
2006	Photo Album of Complex Relationships	Coco Tauro	Barbara Trentalange	Producer, engineer, Mixing, Mastering
2006	Old Time Revival	Zero Down	Zero Down	Producer, engineer, Mixing, Mastering
2006	Feeling the Fall	spinART	The Village Green	Mixing, Mastering
2006	Drowning Out Love		Late Tuesday	Producer, engineer, Mixing, Mastering
2006	The Oaks		The Oaks	Mixing
2006	Siberian		Siberian	Mastering, Mixing
2006	New		Slender Means	Producer, engineer, Mixing, Mastering
2007	Consciously Clones		Surface Tension	Producer, engineer, Mixing
2007	Bayani	Rawkuss	Blue Scholars	Mixing
2007	Hey Celestial	Sonic Boom	Siberian	Mixing
2007	With Me	Sonic Boom	Siberian	Producer, engineer, Mixing
2007	Evaporate	Water Music	Shannon Moore	Producer, engineer, Mixing
2007	Heart of Branches	Actually	Joel Waters	Mastering
2007	Like, Love, Lust and the Open Halls of the Soul	Barsuk	Jesse Sykes & the Sweet Hereafter	Producer, engineer, Mixing
2007	Oybaby	Rendezvous	Sniederman Sisters	Mastering
2007	Truth in Sincerity	Hopeless	Amber Pacific	Producer, engineer, Mixing, Mastering, Percussion
2007	Streets EP	Light in the Attic	The Blakes	Producer, engineer, Mixing, Mastering
2007	Hope Within Chaos	Truce	Truce	Producer, engineer, Mixing, Mastering, Mastering, Programming
2007	Dark Days	Glazed	Alta May	Mastering
2007	Our Fathers	The Oaks	The Oaks	Mixing
2008	Mingle	Light in the Attic	The Saturday Knights	Mixing
2008	Tobacco Road	Hyena/Massline	Common Market	Mastering
2008	Wasted Heart	Century Media	Loaded	Producer, engineer, Mixing, Mastering
2009	Sick	Century Media	Loaded	Producer, engineer, Mixing, Mastering
2009	11:11	Go Down	Veracrash	Mastering
2009	Mouth of Madness	KMFDM	Legion Within	Mastering
2009	Unspeakable Things	The Control Group	Sirens Sister	Producer
2018	The Instrumental and Vocal Sessions, Vol I	The Rumba Kings Recordings	The Rumba Kings	Mixing, Mastering
2019	The Instrumental Sessions, Vol II	The Rumba Kings Recordings	The Rumba Kings	Mixing, Mastering
2020	Mirame	The Rumba Kings Recordings	The Rumba Kings	Mixing, Mastering
2020	Dance With Me	The Rumba Kings Recordings	The Rumba Kings	Mixing, Mastering
2020	Den tha se Ksehaso (Never forget you)	The Rumba Kings Recordings	The Rumba Kings	Mixing, Mastering
2021	La Isla Bonita	The Rumba Kings Recordings	The Rumba Kings	Mixing, Mastering
2022	Love from Mykonos	The Rumba Kings Recordings	The Rumba Kings	Mixing, Mastering
2022	Another World	FTA, Inc	Second Coming	Mixing, Mastering
