= Episode 1999: Live =

Live album by Loaded
- Released: May 1999; April 15, 2008 (reissue)
- Recorded: March 17, 1999 at Al's Bar, Los Angeles, California; and March 27, 1999 at The Opium Den, Los Angeles, California
- Genre: Hard rock, punk rock
- Length: 36:58
- Label: Self-released, Cargo; Pimp (reissue)

Loaded chronology
Episode 1999: Live (1999)	Dark Days (2001)

Episode 1999: Live is a live album by American rock band Loaded, released in May 1999. Recorded during two shows in Los Angeles, California, it is the only album to be released by this incarnation of the band. Initially a backing band for bassist/vocalist Duff McKagan's solo and Guns N' Roses material, they later formed as their own band.

The album featured songs from McKagan's unreleased solo album Beautiful Disease; "Shinin' Down", "Seattle Head", "Superman", "Missing You", "Then and Now" and "Mezz", as well as new material and a cover of The Stooges "Raw Power".

"Seattle Head", "Then and Now" and "Superman" were later re-recorded for Loaded's debut album Dark Days, released in 2001.

== Background ==
After moving back to Seattle in 1998, former Guns N' Roses bassist Duff McKagan recorded his second album, titled Beautiful Disease, which was to be released through Geffen in 1999 and formed Loaded to be his band for the tour supporting the album. With McKagan performing lead vocals and bass duties, Loaded's line-up consisted of guitarists Dez Cadena and Michael Barragan as well as drummer Taz Bentley.

McKagan began promoting the album, however, following the merger between Geffen and Interscope Records, he was dropped from the label and lost all commercial rights to release the record.

== Recording and Release ==
Loaded continued to tour and recorded two of their live shows in Los Angeles, California, the first at Al's Bar on March 17 and the second at The Opium Den on March 27. Both shows were recorded and mixed by Nick Raskulinecz. "Sycophant" and "Raw Power" were recorded during the March 17 show with the rest from the March 27 show.

They released the live album independently, which included a number of songs from the unreleased Beautiful Disease as well as new material, in May 1999 while Cargo Records distributed the album in Europe.

The album was re-released in 2008 by Pimp Records on both CD and digital download formats.

== Track listing ==
All tracks are written by Loaded, except "Raw Power" by Iggy Pop and James Williamson

No.	Title	Length
1.	"Sycophant"	2:13
2.	"Shinin' Down"	2:46
3.	"Seattle Head"	4:16
4.	"Superman"	3:11
5.	"Missing You"	5:18
6.	"Then and Now"	3:59
7.	"She's Got a Lot"	3:04
8.	"Mezz"	4:56
9.	"Ridin' Home"	3:39
10.	"Raw Power" (The Stooges cover)	3:36
Total length:		36:58

== Personnel ==
Loaded

- Duff McKagan – vocals, bass guitar
- Michael Barragan – guitar
- Dez Cadena – guitar
- Taz Bentley – drums

Additional personnel

- Nick Raskulinecz – recording, mixing
