= Plexi =

American gothic noise rock band

- Also known as: Godseed
- Origin: Los Angeles, California, U.S.
- Genres: Noise rock, shoegazing, gothic rock
- Years active: 1993–1999; 2013
- Labels: Sub Pop, Boys Life, I.F.A., Lava/Atlantic
- Past members: Michael Angelos; Michael Barragan; Norm Block

Plexi was an American gothic noise rock band consisting of Michael Angelos (vocals, songwriting, bass), Michael Barragan (guitar, Echoplex, Moog) and Norm Block (drums, percussion). Formed in 1993, their original name was Godseed. Their sound has been compared to bands such as Bauhaus, Sonic Youth, The Cure, Bailter Space, Swervedriver, The Psychedelic Furs, My Bloody Valentine and Psi Com. Plexi's material combined a mix of detached, wry, existential, and romantic lyrics with a flamboyant blend of glam rock and artsy avant-garde textures and noise. Guitarist Michael Barragan was known for regular use of an Echoplex unit to create chaotic walls of sound.

The band members were known for their decadent appearance featuring black leather garb, heavy make-up, and arcane tattoos. These traits, along with their edgy, yet radio-friendly music, made the band stand out from other groups of its era. A blurb on the band in the 1997 CD Spring Lineup: A Compilation Of Sub Pop's Heavy Hitters read, "Embraced by the hardest rock enthusiasts and real favorites at the Viper Room, Plexi is L.A.'s freshest Noxema [sic] girl."

== Lipstick Glue: Early years ==
Plexi was said to have formed in 1993 when Michael Angelos, a former USC film student, met guitarist Michael Barragan in an L.A. bar and drummer Norm Block at a Taoist retreat. However, most of the band's inscrutable Sub Pop bio (i.e. a part about a Hasidic motorcycle gang) was fabricated for comedic value. In 1994, they recorded their first EP for the indie label Boys Life Records, run by alternative rock band Campfire Girls. As evidence of the band's dryly nonchalant humor, a 1995 magazine ad for the EP read, "If you buy only one album this year... Buy Nick Drake's Five Leaves Left." In a mere four days in January 1995, the band recorded a second EP. It was released by the Seattle label I.F.A., corresponding with a tour opening for Archers of Loaf. The EPs attracted attention from larger independent labels, culminating in their "discovery" by a friend of Sub Pop band Sunny Day Real Estate, Curtis W. Pitts. Plexi later claimed that "I.F.A." stood for either "I'll Fight Anyone" or "I'll Fuck Anything". Cats were prominently featured in the artwork for both EPs.

== Cheer Up: Album release ==
From December 1995 to January 1996, their first full-length album was recorded for Sub Pop. The brooding, film noir-esque album was given the ironic title Cheer Up. After much delay due to personnel shakeups within Sub Pop, the album was released in October 1996. Leadoff track/single "Forest Ranger" had strange pop-culture references and a singalong line of, "When I was looking at you, I didn't mind your foggy weather/ I just wonder what it's like to die." The album also featured reworkings of "Magnet" and "Peel" from the second EP. Cheer Up featured cello by Rasputina's Melora Creager on two tracks ("Ordinary Things" and "Star Star"). In an interview with Alternative Press magazine in Nov. 1996, Angelos professed his fandom of Aldous Huxley and David Bowie; upon being asked if Plexi's music might send the wrong message to suicidal listeners, Angelos laughed and responded, "Well, as long as I don't die..."

Plexi then toured with bands such as Bare Minimum, Zeke, Jack Off Jill and Ednaswap, and played at an ESPN X Games qualifying competition in New Orleans. Cheer Up was reissued on Atlantic in the summer of 1997 with a slightly remixed version of "Forest Ranger" and minor artwork variations. A video was shot for "Forest Ranger," directed by David Meyers, and received significant airplay on M2. Plexi were the opening act on a large tour with labelmates Sugar Ray and Smashmouth later that year. Dave Navarro was close friends with Barragan, even naming Cheer Up his favorite album of 1997 in a magazine poll.

== Caught Up: Amsterdamed & its aftermath ==
After embarking to Amsterdam, where they recorded a follow-up album in late 1998, the band dissolved. No official reason for the breakup was ever issued, though the band members remain friends. Angelos would later collaborate with Dave Navarro on the Joy Division tribute track "Day of the Lords" under the outfit name Honeymoon Stitch. There was some suggestion by Navarro the recording session was complicated by substance abuse issues and their vocalist's inability to stay conscious and standing. Rumors of heroin addiction, mostly connected to the band's look, have never been substantiated specifically. Plexi have since played one-off gigs in the L.A. area between 2002 and 2006. "Forest Ranger" was used in the movie Book of Shadows: Blair Witch 2 in 2000. Block drummed in Jack Off Jill for a while, then formed the Plexi-esque band Tape with future She Wants Revenge leader Justin Warfield. Block and Barragan had been featured in the touring band of Mark Lanegan for several years. Angelos has had roles in a few independent films, such as When (1999), and worked on recording a solo album in L.A. He currently lists his profession as music video producer.

In 2013, Plexi reunited to perform at a benefit concert for Denise Franco, alongside the Campfire Girls and Lifter.

== Discography ==
=== Albums ===
- Cheer Up (1996, Sub Pop on CD/LP, Reissued July 1997 on Atlantic, on CD/cassette)

=== EPs, Singles ===
- Plexi EP (April 1995, Boys Life, recorded in 1994)
  - Tracks: "Simple Man" – 3:04, "Na-Na" – 4:08, "Second Sunday" – 4:05, "Lipstick Glue" – 3:32, "Ganesh" – 1:13, "Hollow" – 4:42
- Plexi EP (1995, I.F.A., a.k.a. I.F.A.)
  - Tracks: "Either Way" – 2:28, "Magnet" – 2:29, "Faith Is" – 5:24, "Peel / He" – 5:26
- "Part of Me" & "Caught Up" (November 1995, Sub Pop, one-sided 7")
- "Roller Rock Cam" (1997, Sub Pop, 1-track promotional CD single)
- Mountains EP (1997, Lava/Atlantic, Sub Pop)
  - Tracks: "Mountains" – 3:01, "Forest Ranger (live)" – 4:12, "Change (live)" – 2:48, "Simple Man (live)" – 2:48 [Live tracks recorded 6/25/97 at The Dragonfly club in Hollywood, CA.]
