= Nevada Bachelors =

American rock band

- Origin: Seattle, Washington, US
- Genres: Alternative rock, indie, pop rock
- Years active: 1997–2001
- Labels: PopLlama
- Past members: Robb Benson; Mike Squires; Ben Brunn; Dusty Hayes; Jason Finn

Nevada Bachelors were an American rock band from Seattle, Washington, formed in 1997. The band's lineup consisted of Robb Benson (vocals, rhythm guitar, keyboard), Mike Squires (lead guitar, backing vocals) and Ben Brunn (bass, backing vocals). Dusty Hayes was the band's drummer from their formation until 1999, and was replaced by Jason Finn. They released two studio albums, Carrots & So On (1998) and Hello Jupiter (2000), before disbanding in 2001.

== History ==
=== Formation and Carrots & So On (1997–1999) ===
After moving to Seattle in 1991, musician Robb Benson played with a number of bands before forming the Nevada Bachelors with Dusty Hayes (drums) and Ben Brunn (bass) in 1997. Later, adding to the lineup, former Eat the Feeling bassist and former Compass guitarist Mike Squires,. They recorded their debut album entitled Carrots & So On in February 1998 with Johnny Sangster producing, and the band co-producing, at Egg Studios in Seattle, Washington. The album was released on October 13 of that year through Conrad Uno's PopLlama. The album was well received, earning comparisons to Blur, Supergrass, The Police and Bracket. The band toured in support of the album, while they played several shows supporting Death Cab for Cutie. However, by July 1999, Hayes had departed the band and was replaced by Jason Finn formerly of The Presidents of the United States of America, with the Nevada Bachelors supporting Fountains of Wayne the same year.

=== Hello Jupiter and disbanding (1999–2001) ===
In November 1999, the band recorded their second album entitled Hello Jupiter with producer Martin Feveyear at Jupiter Studios in Seattle, Washington, with the album released on April 11, 2000 through Pop Llama. The same year, Finn, Dave Dederer and Chris Ballew reformed The Presidents of the United States of America while Squires joined Harvey Danger as their live guitarist. By 2001, Benson disbanded the band, citing a lack of focus due to the band members involvements with various projects. Following the breakup, Benson released his first solo EP before forming Dear John Letters with producer, guitarist Johnny Sangster, bassist Richard Davidson and drummer Cassady Laton. However, the band disbanded in 2004 with Benson pursuing a solo career. Squires continued as live guitarist with Harvey Danger before joining The Long Winters then Loaded.

== Band members ==
- Robb Benson – vocals, rhythm guitar, keyboard (1997–2001)
- Mike Squires – lead guitar, backing vocals (1997–2001)
- Ben Brunn – bass, backing vocals (1997–2001)
- Dusty Hayes – drums, backing vocals (1997–1999)
- Jason Finn – drums (1999–2001)

== Discography ==
- Carrots & So On (1998)
- Hello Jupiter (2000)
