= New American Shame =

American rock band

- Origin: Seattle, Washington, U.S.
- Genres: Hard rock, sleaze rock
- Years active: 1998–2001, 2010–present
- Labels: Will, Atlantic
- Members: Johnny Reidt; Jimmy Paulson; Kelly Wheeler; Geoff Reading; Marty Chandler
- Past members: Terry Bratsch; Jack Stringham

New American Shame is an American hard rock band from Seattle, Washington, formed in 1998. Their current lineup consists of Johnny Reidt (vocals), Jimmy Paulson (guitar), Marty Chandler (guitar), Kelly Wheeler (bass) and Geoff Reading (drums). Previous members include Terry Bratsch (guitar) and Jack Stringham (drums).

To date, New American Shame have released one studio album, New American Shame (1999), which was later re-released when the band signed to Atlantic Records.

== History ==
=== Formation, New American Shame, and breakup (1998–2001) ===
In 1998, guitarist Jimmy Paulson, formerly of The Lemons, and vocalist Johnny Reidt (often credited as the one-named Johnny) formed New American Shame in Seattle, Washington, adding guitarist Terry Bratsch, bassist Kelly Wheeler and drummer Jack Stringham to complete the band's lineup. Drawing influences from the likes of Aerosmith, Black Sabbath and Jimi Hendrix, the band built a fan base with "powerful live performances." They soon recorded material for their debut album, produced by Paulson, with Brett Eliason and former Seaweed guitarist Clint Werner mixing and engineering the album respectively.

The resulting album, New American Shame, was released on March 9, 1999 through Will Records. Stringham soon left the band and was replaced by former Green Apple Quick Step drummer Geoff Reading with the band playing at SXSW '99. They attracted major-label attention, including Island, before signing with Atlantic Records.

Atlantic re-released the band's debut album with minor track adjustments and additional drums by Reading. "Under it All" was chosen as the first single, which peaked at number 35 on the Mainstream Rock Chart. A tour of the US, with The Cult, and Japan followed. By 2001, the band walked away from their deal with Atlantic and disbanded soon afterwards.

=== Reunion (2010–present) ===
In 2010, New American Shame reunited, with Bratsch replaced by Supersuckers guitarist Marty Chandler, playing their first show in over nine years on November 7 at Hell's Kitchen in Tacoma, Washington.

== Band members ==
- Johnny Reidt – vocals
- Jimmy Paulson – lead guitar
- Marty Chandler – rhythm guitar
- Kelly Wheeler – bass
- Geoff Reading – drums, percussion

Former members

- Terry Bratsch – rhythm guitar
- Jack Stringham – drums, percussion

== Discography ==
New American Shame

1. "Under It All"
2. "Broken Bones"
3. "What's It to You"
4. "American Shame"
5. "Down in the Valley" (only on the re-release)
6. "Rather Be Rich" (only on the re-release)
7. "Skin Up"
8. "Somethin' Right" (only on the re-release)
9. "Sex Teen"
10. "Lesson in Cool" (only on the re-release)
11. "Auburn"
12. "Doghouse"
