= Eagle Rock Entertainment =

British producer and distributor of music films and programming

- Type: Subsidiary of UMG
- Industry: Music, entertainment, music publishing
- Genre: Rock, jazz, blues, R&B, pop
- Founded: April 1997; 29 years ago
- Founder: Terry Shand, Geoff Kempin, Julian Paul
- Headquarters: London, United Kingdom
- Area served: Worldwide
- Key people: Terry Shand (Executive Chairman/CEO), Simon Hosken (Chief Financial Officer/COO), Geoff Kempin (Executive Director)
- Products: Theatrical, television, DVD, Blu-ray, 3D Blu-ray, digital media, CD
- Parent: Mercury Studios (Universal Music Group)
- Divisions: Eagle Records; Eagle Vision; Eagle Rock Productions; Eagle-i Music Ltd; Eagle Eye Media
- Website: mercurystudios.co

Eagle Rock Entertainment is an international producer and distributor of music films and programming. It operates two record labels (Eagle Records and Armoury Records), a full-service production company (Eagle Rock Productions) and a music publishing subsidiary (Eagle-i Music).

== History ==
Eagle Rock Entertainment was founded in April 1997 by Terry Shand, Geoff Kempin and Julian Paul, three former colleagues at Castle Communications, with capital coming from BMG. It was later acquired by Edel Records and in 2001 entirely sold to the British investment company HgCapital for £34 million. In 2007 a minority stake was re-acquired by Edel AG. The Eagle Vision division was established in 2000. Eagle Rock Entertainment's headquarters are in London with offices in New York and affiliate offices around the world. In April 2014, Eagle Rock Entertainment was acquired by Universal Music Group. Universal Music's purchase of Eagle followed that of much of EMI. Terry Shand continues to lead the company as chairman and CEO from its headquarters in London.

=== Reorganisation as Mercury Studios ===
In 2020, Universal Music established Mercury Studios which absorbed Eagle Rock Entertainment. and its UK-based creative division Globe Productions In 2024, Mercury Studios launched the music channel GIGS on Samsung TV Plus, with this live music and documentary channel being launched on Freeview in the UK as a streaming channel on 16 October 2024.

== Awards ==
The company won a Grammy Award for The Doors documentary When You're Strange in 2010.

== See also ==
- List of record labels
