= Ultimatum (EP) =

2005 EP by the Long Winters

EP by The Long Winters
- Released: October 11, 2005
- Recorded: 2005
- Genre: Indie rock
- Length: 24:42
- Label: Barsuk Records
- Producer: Tucker Martine

The Long Winters chronology
When I Pretend to Fall (2003)	Ultimatum (2005)	Putting the Days to Bed (2006)

Ultimatum is an EP by indie rock band The Long Winters. It was released by Barsuk Records on October 11, 2005, featuring six tracks, four of which were new songs released as a preview for their later release Putting the Days to Bed.

The band's line-up on Ultimatum varies from the line-ups featured on the band's previous two LPs, The Worst You Can Do Is Harm and When I Pretend to Fall. While John Roderick and Eric Corson remain on guitar/vocals and bass/vocals respectively, Mike Squires has been added as an additional guitarist and keyboardist, and Nabil Ayers is the band's latest percussionist. Matt Chamberlain played drums on "The Commander Thinks Aloud".

"The Commander Thinks Aloud" appeared as a remix on MoveOn.org's Future Soundtrack for America compilation in 2004. In 2011, Chris Carrabba of Dashboard Confessional covered "The Commander Thinks Aloud" on his album Covered In The Flood.

== Track listing ==
1. "The Commander Thinks Aloud"
2. "Ultimatum"
3. "Everything Is Talking"
4. "Delicate Hands"
5. "Bride and Bridle" (live) (first appeared on When I Pretend to Fall)
6. "Ultimatum" (live)
