= King James Version (album) =

Studio album by Harvey Danger
- Released: September 12, 2000
- Recorded: March 1999 – February 2000
- Studios: Bearsville (Woodstock, New York); Bear Creek (Woodinville, Washington); John & Stu's Place (Seattle, Washington)
- Genres: Indie rock; alternative rock; pop rock
- Length: 46:29
- Label: London-Sire
- Producers: John Goodmanson · Harvey Danger

Harvey Danger chronology
Where Have All the Merrymakers Gone? (1997)	King James Version (2000)	Sometimes You Have to Work on Christmas (Sometimes) (2004)

Harvey Danger studio album chronology
Where Have All the Merrymakers Gone? (1997)	King James Version (2000)	Little by Little... (2005)

Singles from King James Version
- 1. "Sad Sweetheart of the Rodeo" Released: August 7, 2000; 2. "Authenticity" Released: August 28, 2001

King James Version is the second studio album by American rock band Harvey Danger. It was released on September 12, 2000, through London-Sire Records. It was the band's only album recorded for a major label, and their last with drummer Evan Sult. Written and recorded over the span of 16 months with producer John Goodmanson, the album marked a substantial departure from the lo-fi sound of the band's debut, Where Have All the Merrymakers Gone? (1997); it encompassed a variety of rock music styles and explored "the conflict between faith and skepticism". Although the bulk of the album's material was recorded in March and April 1999, work on the album continued periodically until February 2000 due to a dispute surrounding Harvey Danger's contract, which delayed its release.

The album spawned two singles: "Sad Sweetheart of the Rodeo", which reached number 27 on the Billboard Modern Rock Tracks chart, and "Authenticity". King James Version received favourable reviews from critics, who praised the band's musical growth. Due to a lack of promotional support, sales were extremely poor; by December 2004, it had sold only 25,000 copies in the United States. As a result, Harvey Danger disbanded at the end of the album's supporting tour in April 2001. Despite its commercial failure, King James Version gradually attained a cult following and critical acclaim in the years following its release, and was later named one of the best albums of the 2000s by PopMatters. Harvey Danger performed the album in its entirety for one show in 2008.

== Background ==
In 1997, Harvey Danger released their debut studio album, Where Have All the Merrymakers Gone?, through the Arena Rock Recording Company. Although the album was not a commercial success, major labels engaged in a bidding war to sign Harvey Danger after the album's second track, "Flagpole Sitta", began receiving airplay from several college radio stations and Los Angeles-based KROQ. The band subsequently signed with London Recordings' Slash Records imprint in May 1998, shortly after they hired Arena Rock owner Greg Glover. Where Have All the Merrymakers Gone? was reissued by Slash/London the following month to great commercial success, largely due to "Flagpole Sitta"; the album went on to sell over 500,000 copies in the United States, and in February 1999 was certified Gold by the Recording Industry Association of America (RIAA). "Private Helicopter" was issued as the album's second single in October 1998, but it did not make an impact on any singles charts. Shortly thereafter, Harvey Danger ceased touring and returned to Seattle in November 1998.

Upon returning to Seattle, Harvey Danger went on a short hiatus during the winter holiday season. The band briefly considered breaking up, but decided against it, and began writing new material for their next album in November 1998. The album was initially envisioned as a "dour, mellow anti-pop" record. The band's new material was more experimental and less commercial-sounding than their prior output. The band intended to distance themselves from "Flagpole Sitta", which they thought had marked them as a one-hit wonder and a "major label fabrication" because of its ironic lyrics, which frontman Sean Nelson believed listeners had taken at "face value". Nelson further explained:

[O]ur stated position was that we were never going to write another song like "Flagpole Sitta".

We would write long seven-minute slow songs without a chorus just to prove we were more than this hit single. It tweaks your entire consciousness to be identified by only one song when you are so dead set on being recognized for all the other things you have to offer.

== Recording and production ==
Harvey Danger finished recording demos for King James Version in February 1999. Thereafter, in early March 1999, the band travelled to Woodstock, New York, to record with producer John Goodmanson at Bearsville Sound. At Bearsville, the band recorded the album's basic tracks and some overdubs, before ultimately deciding to return to Seattle to record the rest of the album. "[I]t felt like we were spending a lot of money just so we could say we recorded at Bearsville. It wasn't necessarily making us play better. So we went back home to do the rest", Nelson stated. Recording continued into late April 1999 at John & Stu's Place in Seattle and at Bear Creek Studio in Woodinville, Washington, where additional overdubs were recorded to give the album "more breadth, [and] some more colors". On May 17, 1999, Harvey Danger mixed King James Version at The Village Recorder in Los Angeles.

Harvey Danger had hoped to release King James Version in August or September 1999, but owing to a series of corporate mergers and restructurings, the album was indefinitely delayed. Universal Music Group (UMG), which had merged with London Recordings' parent company PolyGram in December 1998, had sold London Recordings' US division to Warner Music Group. Then, in August 1999, Warner Music Group announced that it would be merging London with its Sire Records Group to create London-Sire Records. Shortly thereafter, a dispute arose between London-Sire and UMG over the rights to Harvey Danger's contract, resulting in the band being moved into a "corporate black hole" at UMG. The contractual dispute prevented Harvey Danger from recording and touring, and the band was forced to turn down an offer to open for The Pretenders. London-Sire also owed Harvey Danger hundreds of thousands of dollars, and Goodmanson, who allowed Harvey Danger to record at John & Stu's on the belief that he would be quickly reimbursed, took a financial hit; he was later compensated in full by the band. Nelson later stated that he felt "morose" and "suicidally depressed" throughout 1999 as a result of the album's delays.

During the band's corporate struggles, the members of Harvey Danger put the album on hold and worked on individual projects. When the band came back and revisited the album with a different perspective, they decided to continue working on King James Version. During what Nelson described as the album's "second gestation period", parts of King James Version were revised, and three new songs—"Meetings With Remarkable Men (Show Me the Hero)", "Humility on Parade" and "Loyalty Bldg."—were recorded for the album. Recording was completed in late February 2000, and in June 2000, the band re-mixed/mixed the majority of the album's tracks at The Warehouse Studio in Vancouver, B.C. Nelson later remarked that Harvey Danger had "finished" King James Version three times during 1999 and 2000.

== Composition ==
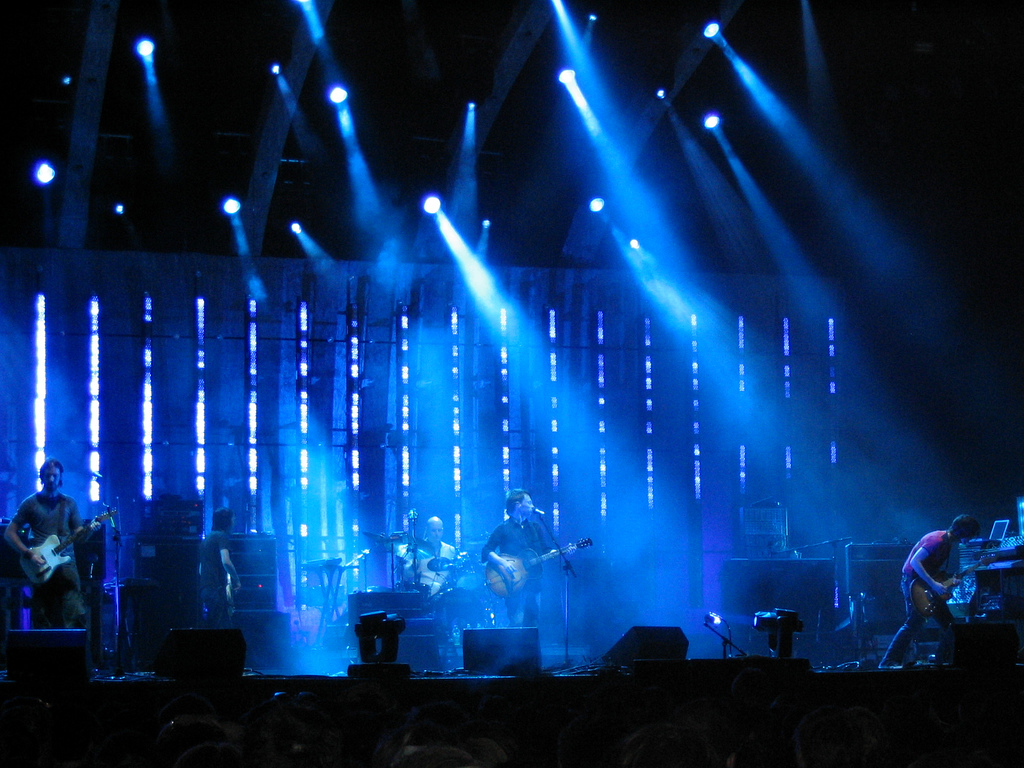
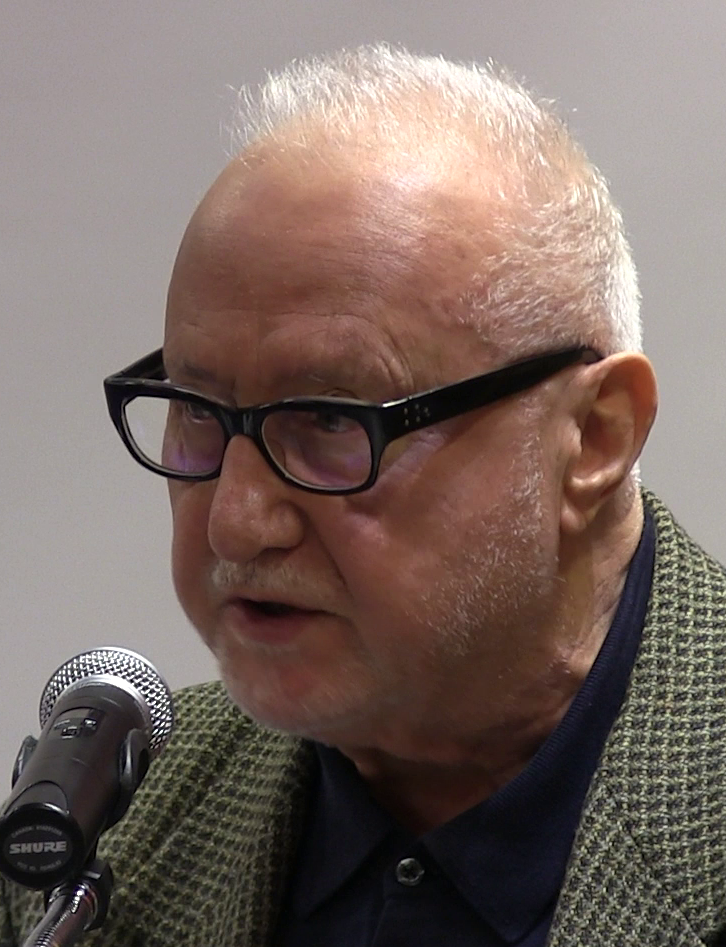
The musical and lyrical content of King James Version were primarily inspired by the works of Radiohead (above) and Frederic Tuten (below).

=== Music ===
Musically, King James Version has been described as indie rock, alternative rock and pop rock. Reviews also noted that the album was influenced by power pop, rockabilly, glam rock and punk rock. In contrast to the band's debut album, King James Version features a less grungy and lo-fi sound, and uses a wider variety of instruments, including keyboards, piano and pump organ. Guitarist Jeff J. Lin, a classically trained musician, composed cello and viola arrangements for the album, which were played by members of the Seattle Symphony. Nelson's vocal performances were compared to Chuck Berry, Robert Smith and Richard Hell.

Speaking with Yahoo!'s LAUNCH, Nelson labelled the album a middle ground between "catchy rock" and "very quiet, pretty songs". "Sad Sweetheart of the Rodeo" was described by Billboard as featuring a "laid-back feel complete with 80's retro guitar effects." "(Theme from) Carjack Fever" is a reworked version of "Carjack Fever", an early Harvey Danger song first recorded in 1995, which later appeared in an unfinished state and played in reverse as a hidden track on Where Have All the Merrymakers Gone?. "Pike St./Park Slope" is a sombre piano ballad and was compared to the works of Ben Folds and John Lennon's "Imagine". "Underground" is a "radically-rearranged" cover of a song by the Seattle band This Busy Monster.

The overall atmosphere and direction of King James Version was, in part, informed by the English rock band Radiohead and their 1997 album OK Computer. After hearing about the album's success, which Nelson described as the "ultimate one-hit wonder redemption narrative", Harvey Danger decided to experiment with their sound and make a "great leap forward, artistically, and do something really ambitious" in order to maintain their credibility. The band was ultimately unable to emulate Radiohead's creative and technical process, resulting in stripped-back arrangements. Nelson stated, "It certainly was no OK Computer, though there are a couple of moments where we obviously are reaching for that kind of faux-epic sound. I’ve listened to King James Version a lot and I don’t know what the hell it sounds like."

=== Lyrics ===
To me, a lot of the lyrics are intended as sort of funny, and they're intentionally over-wordy to make some kind of point about being trapped inside the mind. A lot of the people in these songs are sort of doomed by their own cleverness to not be able to really feel anything, or not be able to sort out their feelings, and they try and do it by talking or by being clever, but it just doesn't work — they wind up feeling miserable.

— Sean Nelson

The heavily philosophical and ambiguous lyrics on King James Version, written by Sean Nelson, primarily discuss "the conflict between faith and skepticism". The album's lyrics are often humorous, cynical, sarcastic or deadpan, and they reference historical popular culture, literature and places. Various popular figures and musicians, such as Jesus, F. Scott Fitzgerald, Nathanael West, the Malboro Man and Morrissey are mentioned on the album's tracks. The band has described the lyrics as using multiple literary devices, including first person and multiple perspectives and unreliable narrators; sometimes, the album employs dialogues. Nelson described the album as being "very personal, but not autobiographical", and "more in the way of character study than autobiographical revelation". The album's opening track, "Meetings with Remarkable Men (Show Me the Hero)", is about a man "looking for somebody to be a disciple of. Jesus doesn't work, Morrissey doesn't work, and Kip Winger is the only one who provides a voice of reason". "Sad Sweetheart of the Rodeo" directly alludes to Sweetheart of the Rodeo by The Byrds, and also references "Lonesome Cowboy Bill" by The Velvet Underground.

The referential nature of King James Version's lyrics was inspired by the works of Frederic Tuten, an American novelist known for his style of referencing to the past via the present. Nelson stated, "I feel that's a huge part of listening to rock n' roll music. As a listener, when I want to talk about anything with my friends, I can casually say half a line from any of a hundred songs and they know exactly what I'm talking about. I don't have to elucidate the sentiment any further. It's admitting rock songs can be a response to rock songs, and not necessarily be just so referential that they're just about rock songs." Nelson thanks Tuten in the album's liner notes, as well as novelist Philip Roth and Le Show by Harry Shearer. To further connect with the album's recurring theme of referencing other musicians and people, King James Version features an array of backup vocalists, including Grant Lee Buffalo's Grant-Lee Phillips and Death Cab for Cutie's Ben Gibbard, in order to "reflect many, many voices". Nelson deliberately avoided writing about Harvey Danger's struggles with success, believing the subject to be "stupid and irrelevant to most people that listen to music".

=== Title and packaging ===
The title is both a reference to the King James Version of the Bible, and to the album's "second gestation period". Nelson described the album's title as referring to "coming through a convoluted process and arriving at a version of the album and the band that feels sort of definitive". The album's artwork, done by Tae Won Yu, was described by Nelson as an expression of the "band's fractured mental and psychic state, or relationship to ourselves, our city, our project, and each other."

== Release and promotion ==
Following the album's completion, several UMG labels rejected King James Version. In June 2000, Harvey Danger chose to re-sign with their "new/old" label, London-Sire Records. On July 6, 2000, Harvey Danger announced on their website that King James Version had been fully sequenced, mastered and approved by London-Sire, and unveiled the new album's title and release date. Prior to the album's release, Harvey Danger expanded into a sextet with the introduction of guitarist Mike Squires and keyboard player John Roderick, in an effort to improve the quality of the band's live performances.

King James Version was released in the United States and Canada on September 12, 2000. Alongside the album, a self-titled EP containing three B-sides from the King James Version sessions was sold with purchases of the album exclusively at Circuit City stores, limited to 3,000 copies. The EP's songs were later included in the band's 2009 compilation album Dead Sea Scrolls. Nelson attempted to get King James Version (including its B-sides) released on vinyl through Barsuk Records, of which he was a partner, but those plans fell through due to legal issues surrounding licensing. The album's release was met with little fanfare, and failed to make an impact on the Billboard 200 chart. Speaking with The Morning Call three weeks after the album's release, Nelson stated that he had anticipated, and received, "a lot of indifference" towards King James Version's release, and felt that most of Harvey Danger's audience was made up of "the sort of people who buy whatever is on the radio, or they buy a record for a hit and they don’t listen to, or care about, what’s on the rest of the record". By December 2004, the album had sold 25,000 copies in the United States, well below the sales of the band's debut album.

London-Sire promoted King James Version with the release of one single, "Sad Sweetheart of the Rodeo", which was serviced to radio stations on August 7, 2000. The single became a minor hit for the band, reaching number 27 on Billboard's Modern Rock Tracks chart and remaining on the chart for nine weeks. The band filmed a music video for the song, directed by Evan Bernard, in Los Angeles, California on August 15 and 16, 2000. The music video was added to rotation on MTV2; it was due to premiere on MTV's 120 Minutes on September 24, 2000, but an MTV intern played the music video for "Flagpole Sitta" by accident instead. MTV responded to the band's complaints by claiming that the video for "Sad Sweetheart of the Rodeo" had received poor test screenings, and it was pulled from rotation. The band also appeared on The Late Late Show with Craig Kilborn on October 18, 2000. The album's second single, "Authenticity", was released on August 28, 2001, through Gold Circle Records. At that point, the band had been proposing that the song be released as a single for nearly a year because it had been included in the soundtracks of Dude, Where's My Car? (2000) and Soul Survivors (2001), as well as the trailer of Soul Survivors. However, the single did not receive a music video or widespread promotion, as Harvey Danger had broken up by the time it was released.

Harvey Danger initially embarked on a national tour across the United States and Canada throughout the first half of September 2000 in support of King James Version. The band performed in Montreal and played an acoustic set at Tower Records in Seattle on September 12. From October 7 to October 27, 2000, Harvey Danger toured as an opening act for the pop-punk band SR-71 alongside the power pop band Wheatus. The remainder of the band's shows in 2000 took place in the band's hometown of Seattle during late December, where the band performed three songs for the Screaming Santa's X-Mas Show at the I-Spy on December 23, and a New Year's Eve show at Consolidated Works. From March 22 to 24, 2001, Harvey Danger performed as an opener for Alien Crime Syndicate. The band played their final show of that year on April 21, 2001, alongside Hazel and Quasi.

== Critical reception ==
Professional ratings
Review scores
Source	Rating
AllMusic	3/5 stars
The Boston Phoenix	3/4 stars
The Encyclopedia of Popular Music	3/5 stars
Entertainment Weekly	B+
Melodic	3.5/5 stars
Rolling Stone	3/5 stars
The Stranger	3/5 stars
Wall of Sound	74/100

The initial critical response to King James Version was generally favorable. AllMusic's MacKenzie Wilson called Harvey Danger "fresh and witty, [and] continuously satirical throughout" the album. Par Winberg of Melodic described the album as "unique" and awarded it three-and-a-half stars. James Sullivan of Entertainment Weekly gave the album a B+ rating, describing it as "mold-busting" and "a play for longevity". Bob Remstein of Wall of Sound scored the album 74 out of a possible 100, praising its catchiness and clever humour. David Wild of Rolling Stone called the album "barbed", but also said that it was "a step forward in both ambition and accomplishment", awarding it three stars out of five. Writing about the album in passing, Eric Weisbard of SPIN described King James Version as "[kicking] their debut album's ass" and praised Nelson's increased confidence as a frontman and the band's improved cohesiveness.

Critical assessments on the lyrical content of King James Version were more mixed. Remstein felt that Nelson's lyrics were overdone at points, and Sullivan took issue with the "caustic" nature of the lyrics; Weisbard also questioned whether the album's "witty swagger and rejection of novelty grade goofiness" would be misunderstood by listeners. However, both Remstein and Sullivan agreed that the album's smart humour prevailed over their issues with the lyrics. Similarly, Alex Pappademas of CMJ New Music Monthly praised Nelson for his improved songwriting, and for "[figuring] out how to make assets out of the traits that used to make him annoying".

== Aftermath and legacy ==
The members of Harvey Danger were upset by the failure of King James Version, which they attributed to London-Sire's ineffectual marketing and distribution of the album, and felt that the album had not truly been "released". Nelson has said: "Technically it was released, but it was released so poorly and haphazardly promoted that we just felt we had been robbed of an experience that was important to us." Harvey Danger disbanded at the end of their tour in April 2001 as a result of the album's failure. Nelson said, "We inevitably started hating each other, because who else was there to hate? We broke up because we had nothing else to say to each other at that point."

After disbanding, the band's members pursued a number of musical and non-musical endeavours, with Nelson becoming a movie critic for the Seattle bi-weekly newspaper The Stranger and a business partner at Barsuk Records. In 2002, he formed a new band with Roderick, the Long Winters, before leaving the band to start work on a solo album. Nelson reached out to Jeff Lin and bassist Aaron Huffman to help out with the album, which ultimately resulted in Harvey Danger's reformation in April 2004. Drummer Evan Sult, who had moved from Seattle to Chicago during the band's hiatus and was then a member of the indie rock band Bound Stems, declined to join the band's reunion; he was subsequently replaced by Michael Welke, who remained with the band until their second breakup in 2009. The negative experiences regarding the release and promotion of King James Version influenced Harvey Danger's decision to release their follow-up album, Little by Little... (2005), as a free download on the band's website, which Nelson said gave the band "that sense of satisfaction or closure that comes from making a record and releasing it to the public. They either embrace it or don't, but at least they'll have the option of noticing it this time".

In the absence of commercial success, King James Version attained a cult following; while working on their own separate musical projects, people would approach Sult and Nelson to tell them of their admiration of the album. King James Version's critical standing continued to rise, and has been credited with cementing a legacy for the band. Exclaim!'s Michael Edwards and Cokemachineglow's Christopher Alexander both compared the album with Weezer's Pinkerton (1996), another sophomore effort which performed poorly upon release but later attracted acclaim. In 2009, David Buchanan of Consequence of Sound called King James Version the "most underappreciated album of 2000". In 2008, Myles Griffin of the Spartanburg Herald-Journal praised the album as "one of the most creative and enjoyable rock albums of the decade". Evan Sawdey of PopMatters lauded King James Version as "one of the greatest rock albums of the decade" in 2013; the site would later place the album at number 73 on their list of "The 100 Best Albums of the 2000s" in 2020. Riverfront Times also included the album on their list of the "Six Best Sophomore Albums By One Hit Wonders" in 2012.

Harvey Danger performed King James Version in its entirety on March 7, 2008, at the Triple Door in Seattle as part of a set of concerts commemorating the 10th anniversary of Where Have All the Merrymakers Gone?. Ten of the album's twelve songs (excluding "You Miss the Point Completely I Get the Point Exactly" and "(This Is) The Thrilling Conversation You've Been Waiting For") were played at the band's final show at the Crocodile Café in Seattle on August 29, 2009.

On April 12, 2025, "King James Version" was released for the first time on vinyl as part of Record Store Day. The 25th anniversary 2 LP set featured deep sea-blue vinyl, liner notes and 4 bonus tracks, 3 of which previously available as a free, limited edition bonus cd available at Circuit City stores upon the album's initial release. All 4 of the bonus tracks were also released on the compilation CD "Dead Sea Scrolls" released in 2009. The RSD release was limited to 1000 units.

== Track listing ==
All lyrics are written by Sean Nelson; all music is composed by Harvey Danger, except "Underground", written by Chris Possazana.

No.	Title	Length
1.	"Meetings with Remarkable Men (Show Me the Hero) (Note: Alternatively written as "Meetings with Remarkable Men - Show Me the Hero" on Spotify.)"	2:53
2.	"Humility on Parade"	4:30
3.	"Why I'm Lonely"	3:33
4.	"Sad Sweetheart of the Rodeo"	3:28
5.	"You Miss the Point Completely I Get the Point Exactly"	4:12
6.	"Authenticity"	2:31
7.	"(Theme from) Carjack Fever"	3:40
8.	"Pike St./Park Slope"	4:42
9.	"(This Is) The Thrilling Conversation You've Been Waiting For"	2:53
10.	"Loyalty Bldg."	6:06
11.	"Underground" (This Busy Monster cover)	4:39
12.	"The Same as Being in Love"	3:29
Total length:		46:29

== Personnel ==
Credits are adapted from the album's liner notes.

Harvey Danger

- Sean Nelson – Lead and backing vocals, keyboards, melodian, tambourine, triangle
- Jeff J. Lin – guitar, piano, Hammond organ, theremin, xylophone, "silver box o' death", string arrangements
- Aaron Huffman – bass guitar, guitar, pipe organ, vibraphone
- Evan Sult – drums

Additional musicians

- Anne Marie Ruljancich – backing vocals (4)
- Grant-Lee Phillips – backing vocals (6)
- Ben Gibbard – backing vocals (9)
- Ken Stringfellow – backing vocals (9)
- Lois Maffeo – backing vocals (12)
- Marc Olsen – slide guitar (5)
- Jami Sieber – electric cello (8)
- Terri Benshoof – cello (8, 11)
- Christopher Possanza – songwriting (11)
- Larry Sult – banjo (11)
- Rajan Krishnaswami – cello (11)
- Joe Gottesman – viola (11)
- Shari Link – viola (11)

Production

- John Goodmanson – production, engineering, mixing
- Damien Shannon – assistant engineer (at Bearsville)
- Aaron Franz – assistant engineer (at Bearsville)
- Carl Plaster – drum tech (at Bearsville)
- Fisher – guitar tech (at Bearsville)
- Ryan Hadlock – assistant engineer (at Bear Creek)
- Zack Blackstone – assistant engineer (at John & Stu's)
- Okhee Kim – assistant engineer (at The Village Recorder)
- Greg Calbi – mastering

Management

- AAM – management
- Peter Lewit – legal representation (from Davis, Shapiro and Lewit, LLC)
- Greg Glover – A&R
- Little Big Man – booking agent

Artwork

- Tae Won Yu – art direction, design, photography

== Release history ==
Region	Date	Label	Format	Catalog #	Ref.
United States	September 12, 2000	London-Sire Records	CD, DL	31143-2	
Canada	September 12, 2000	London-Sire Records	CD, DL	CD 31143	
