= Western State Hurricanes =

American indie rock band

- Origin: Seattle, Washington
- Genres: Indie rock
- Years active: 1997–1999
- Labels: None
- Members: John Roderick; Stephanie Wicker; Bo Gilliland; Michael Shilling

Western State Hurricanes was a short-lived Seattle-based indie rock band in the late 1990s. It is best known as a precursor to the more successful group The Long Winters—both bands were fronted by songwriter John Roderick, and many Western State Hurricanes songs were later revamped into Long Winters songs.

== Biography ==
=== Formation ===
While attending classes at the University of Washington, and performing with his band the Bun Family Players, John Roderick had the opportunity to network with fellow musicians in other Seattle-area bands, such as This Busy Monster and Harvey Danger. In October 1997 at the final Bun Family Players show, John met Algae front-woman and guitarist Stephanie Wicker.

The two began recording songs written on acoustic guitar, striving for "singer/songwritery boy-girl harmonies." After experimenting with programmed drums and bass, they eventually decided to bring in additional musicians to play along. Bo Gilliland became the bass player and Michael Shilling joined on drums.

The group played their first show on May 4, 1998, in Seattle to a sold-out crowd at the Breakroom, opening for Sycophant. Roderick would later recount, "We were all shitting our pants. But we played the show and it was just awesome." The band recorded a demo with notable producer Phil Ek and sold hundreds of copies at concerts.

=== Failed Sub Pop deal and breakup ===
At the Hurricanes' third show, Jonathan Poneman from Sub Pop approached Roderick to talk about signing the band. Weeks of negotiations followed, and the deal fell through. "At one point, when we were getting into a heated discussion about how much he was going to give us to record, I put my feet up on his desk and my hands behind my head," Roderick later said. "I was like, 'Let's talk turkey.' And he was apparently really offended by this." At this point, Poneman apparently became uninterested in putting out any music by the band.

An ill-fated attempt was made at creating a full-length album. Roderick later spoke of the failed sessions: "We didn't go to a studio. We had this whole indie cred idea that we were going to do a basement recording on somebody's Tascam. But the dude was a mess. He was a bad engineer and a bad guy."

The band played the SXSW festival in March 1999 with burgeoning fellow northwest-based indie pop-rockers Death Cab for Cutie. The group played only a handful of further shows; their final concert took place on April 17, 1999, at the Showbox in Seattle.

Following the dissolution of the band, Roderick traveled alone through Europe for several months. Upon returning to the United States, he became the touring keyboardist for Harvey Danger during their King James Version tour. Shortly afterwards, Roderick formed the Long Winters with Sean Nelson and producer Chris Walla.

=== Revival ===
In 2019, Roderick brought the original tapes for their 1998 self-titled demo tape along with 1/4" 16-track tapes from their abandoned full-length album to Studio Litho in Seattle and began to resuscitate the original recordings. As of June 2019, Roderick and producer/engineer Floyd Reitsma had remixed and mastered 10 of these tracks, many of which had in the interim been recorded in a different style as songs by Roderick's The Long Winters.

==== Western State Hurricanes Debut LP ====
Western State Hurricanes' debut LP was launched as an Indiegogo campaign on Latent Print Records in September 2019, consisting of the following tracks:

1. Unsalted Butter
2. Samaritan
3. Carparts
4. Copernicus
5. Medicine Cabinet Pirate
6. Through With Love
7. Delicate Hands
8. Mimi
9. Nora
10. Samaritan Reprise

The album was released digitally and on colored vinyl in February 2020. The band appeared in concert on local Seattle radio station KEXP on February 6, 2020. To mark the release of the album, the band also played two shows at the Tractor Tavern on February 7 & 8, 2020.

== Discography ==
- "Western State Hurricanes" demo tape (1998)
- "Western State Hurricanes" demo CD (1999)
- Through With Love (2020)
