= Dress Like Your Idols =

Studio album by BOAT
- Released: March 22, 2011
- Genre: Indie rock
- Length: 31:37
- Label: Magic Marker Records

BOAT chronology
Setting the Paces (2009)	Dress Like Your Idols (2011)	Pretend To Be Brave (2013)

Dress Like Your Idols is the fourth full-length album by indie rock band BOAT, released in 2011. It is the follow-up to the band's 2009 album, Setting the Paces.

== Reception ==
Professional ratings
Review scores
Source	Rating
Allmusic	4/5 stars
Pitchfork Media	(7.6/10)

Dress Like Your Idols received largely positive reviews from critics. AllMusic's Tim Sendra praised the album saying, "Dress Like is their best record to date, with their best songs" and the songs have "super hooks." Pitchfork Media's Mark Hogan claimed, "The result is the best album yet from a band whose style finally appears to be back in vogue" and compared the album's sound to Surfer Blood and Weezer.

== Album cover ==
The album cover received acclaim, including being named one of the best of the year by Paste Magazine. The cover artwork features illustrated tributes to several other album covers, a wink at the title Dress Like Your Idols. From top to bottom, left to right, the tributes are:

- Built to Spill, Keep It Like a Secret
- Ramones, End of the Century
- The Long Winters, When I Pretend to Fall
- Jon Spencer Blues Explosion, Orange
- The Velvet Underground, The Velvet Underground & Nico
- The Sonics, Boom (or Sonic Youth, Washing Machine on some versions)
- Pearl Jam, Yield
- Elliott Smith, Figure 8
- Pavement, Wowee Zowee

== Track listing ==
1. "Changing of the Guard" – 2:48
2. "Bite My Lips" – 3:09
3. "King Kong" – 3:15
4. "L-O-V-E" – 0:47
5. "Forever in Armitron" – 3:07
6. "Classically Trained" – 2:38
7. "Water It Down" – 0:47
8. "Kinda Scared of Love Affairs" – 2:38
9. "Landlocked" – 3:04
10. "Do the Double Take" – 1:50
11. "Frank Black Says" – 2:15
12. "Noises in the Night" – 2:45
13. "Dress Like Your Idols" – 2:25

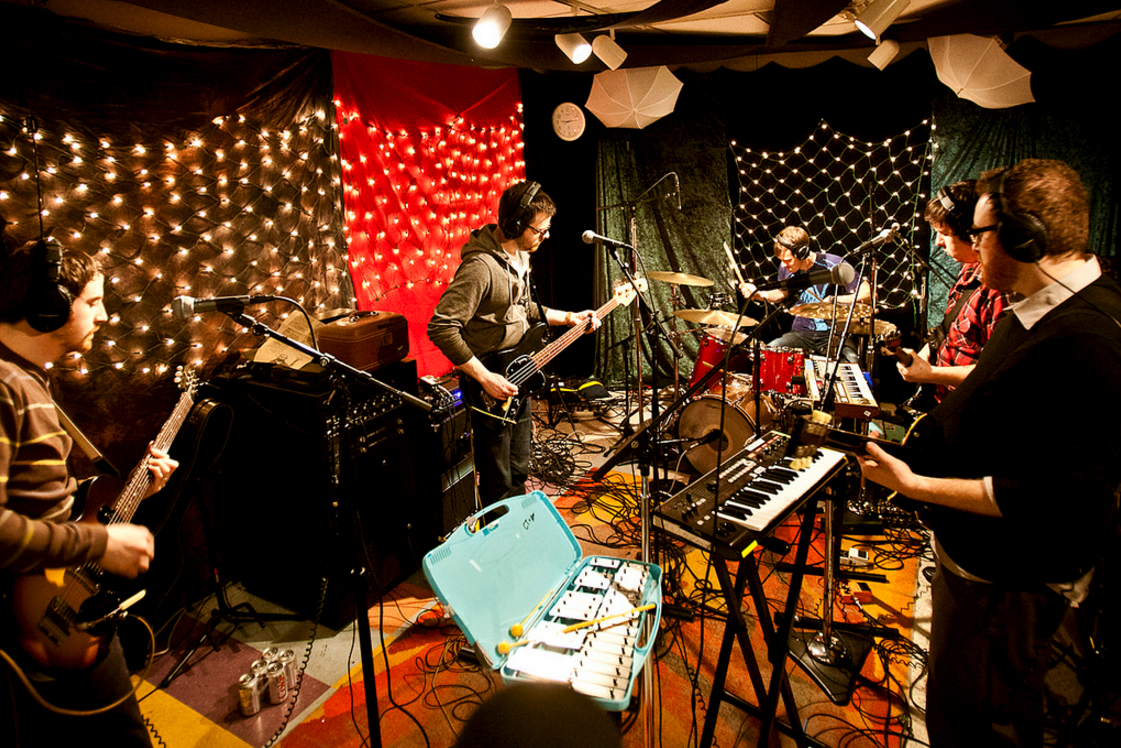
BOAT performs live with John in the Morning KEXP-FM. Seattle, WA 03-22-11. Photo by Laura Totten.

== Personnel ==
- D. Crane, vocals and guitar
- J. Goodman, multi-instrumentalist, percussion
- J. Long, drums, percussion, vocals
- M. McKenzie, bass, guitar, vocals
- B. Stewart, guitar, tambourine
- J. Roderick, additional vocal (9)

Recording

- Jackson Justice Long, producer, recording, mixing (7, 10)
- Cam Nicklaus, mixing, recording
- Ed Brooks, mastering
- D. Crane, recording (10)
- J. Mendoza, additional recording (10)
