= When I Pretend to Fall =

Studio album by The Long Winters
- Released: May 6, 2003
- Recorded: 2003
- Genre: Alternative rock
- Length: 47:49
- Label: Barsuk Records
- Producer: John Roderick, Ken Stringfellow, Chris Walla, Kip Beelman

The Long Winters chronology
The Worst You Can Do Is Harm (2002)	When I Pretend to Fall (2003)	Ultimatum (2005)

Professional ratings
Review scores
Source	Rating
Allmusic	link
Pitchfork Media	7.2/10

When I Pretend to Fall is the second album by indie rock band The Long Winters. It was released on Barsuk Records in 2003.

== Track listing ==
1. "Blue Diamonds" – 3:49
2. "Scared Straight" – 4:17
3. "Shapes" – 4:03
4. "Cinnamon" – 4:12
5. "Bride and Bridle" – 3:32
6. "Blanket Hog" – 6:06
7. "It'll Be a Breeze" – 2:59
8. "Stupid" – 4:01
9. "Prom Night at Hater High" – 4:06
10. "New Girl" – 2:31
11. "The Sound of Coming Down" – 3:51
12. "Nora" – 4:22

== Band members ==
With the exception of one tour in 2003, when Ken Stringfellow temporarily replaced Sean Nelson (and The Long Winters became Stringfellow's backing band), The Long Winters' lineup remained as follows from 2002-early 2004.

- John Roderick – vocals, guitar, keyboards, lap steel, tambourine, loops
- Sean Nelson – vocals, keyboards
- Michael Shilling – drums
- Eric Corson – bass, accordion

=== Additional Players (alphabetically, by track) ===
- Jon Auer – electric guitar (2)
- Peter Buck – mandolin (4)
- Chris Caniglia – keyboards (3, 11)
- Dave Carter – trumpet (2)
- Katrina Cordi – violin (6)
- Jennifer Falkner – vocals (10)
- Craig Flory – tenor sax (2)
- Nathan Harrison – cello (6)
- Kerry Downing Johnson – viola (6)
- Scott McCaughey – boomerang harmonica (5)
- Sean Ripple – vibraphone (12)
- Bart Roderick – organ, piano (4, 9, 10)
- Steve Scalfati – alto sax (2)
- Mike Simpson – French horn (1)
- Sarah Standard – viola (9)
- Ken Stringfellow – vocals, piano, kurzweil, bass (1, 2, 4, 6, 8)
- Megan Thompson – vocals (10)
- Chris Walla – guitars (2, 11)
- Christa Wells – vocals (4)
- Blake Wescott – tambourine (3, 8, 11)
- Stephanie Wicker – vocals (4)
- Gloria Wu – vocals (10)

== Other information ==
- Track 9, "Prom Night at Hater High" is also the title of a One Tree Hill episode from season 4.
- The album's title comes from track 8 "Stupid".
- The indie rock band BOAT parodied the album's cover art, among several others, on its 2011 release Dress Like Your Idols.
