= Little by Little... =

2005 studio album by Harvey Danger

Studio album by Harvey Danger
- Released: September 13, 2005
- Recorded: January 8–24, 2005
- Studios: Robert Lang (Shoreline, Washington); Soundhouse Recording
- Genres: Indie rock; alternative rock; power pop
- Length: 37:48 (original); 39:03 (Kill Rock Stars release)
- Labels: Phonographic; Kill Rock Stars (2006 re-release)
- Producers: John Goodmanson; Steve Fisk

Harvey Danger chronology
Sometimes You Have to Work on Christmas (Sometimes) (2004)	Little by Little... (2005)	Dead Sea Scrolls (2009)

Harvey Danger studio album chronology
King James Version (2000)	Little by Little... (2005)

Singles from Little by Little...
- 1. "Cream and Bastards Rise" Released: November 8, 2005; 2. "Little Round Mirrors" Released: October 10, 2006

Little by Little... is the third and final studio album by American rock band Harvey Danger. It was initially released on September 13, 2005, through the band's label Phonographic Records. It is the band's first and only album with drummer Michael Welke, replacing the band's original drummer Evan Sult. The album marked a stylistic shift for the band, away from the guitar-oriented indie rock influenced by acts such as Weezer, Nirvana, and Pavement and towards a piano-focused sound.

The album received generally positive reviews from critics, specifically for its pop styling, although the band's "smart" lyrical style received more varied responses. It would the band's last album of entirely new material–followed up by rarities collection Dead Sea Scrolls (2009)–as well as including the band's third- and second-to-last singles before their final composition, "The Show Must Not Go On".

== Release ==
The album was released on the band's own Phonographic Records label on September 13, 2005. The CD version featured a second disc of B-sides and outtakes in deluxe packaging. In an effort to "embrace the indisputable fact of music in the 21st century", the band made the album available as a free download via BitTorrent and on the band's website. They pointed out that "it’s important that people understand the free download concept isn’t a frivolous act. It’s a key part of our promotional campaign, along with radio and press promotion, live shows, and videos. It’s a bet that the resources of the Internet can make possible a new way for musicians to find their audience – and forge a meaningful artistic career built on support from cooperative, not adversarial, relationships."

On April 19, 2006, the band announced on their MySpace blog that the album had been picked up by Olympia-based label Kill Rock Stars for nationwide release on July 25, 2006. The re-release's track listing, song order, and album art is different from the Phonographic Records release. The band did some limited touring to accompany the release.

== Album and song titles ==
The album title is taken from a quote by Melvyn Douglas's character Homer Bannon in the 1963 film Hud: "Little by little, the look of the country changes because of the men we admire."

The title of the song "Cream and Bastards Rise" is a quote by Paul Newman's character in Harper (1966). "Happiness Writes White" is a maxim first put forth by French writer Henry de Montherlant.

"The Piano Lesson" features someone attempting to play Beethoven's "Für Elise" before switching to Scott Joplin's "The Entertainer."

"Wine, Women and Song" is the first line of "Villanelle of the Poet's Road" by Ernest Christopher Dowson.

== Reception ==
Professional ratings
Review scores
Source	Rating
AllMusic	3.5/5 stars
Alternative Press	4/5 stars
The A.V. Club	positive
Consequence of Sound	C−
Melodic	3/5 stars
Paste	positive
Pitchfork	6.9/10
PopMatters	7/10
Stylus Magazine	C−
Tiny Mix Tapes	3.5/5 stars

Little by Little... received generally positive reviews upon release, with AllMusic calling it "smart and compelling" and praising the band returning from their hiatus with "all their smarts (and hooks) intact". Paste further praised the album, calling it "gentle" and "melodious".

In a less positive review, Adam Moerder for Pitchfork praised the band's shift towards pop compositions while critiquing the album for retaining the lyrical style of the band's earlier indie-oriented work, finding it "leaving [listeners] with delightful vestiges [of 90's indie bands] though ultimately sounding like a Ben Folds album".

== Track listing ==
All songs written by Aaron Huffman, Jeff J. Lin and Sean Nelson.

=== Phonographic Records release (2005) ===
Disc one
No.	Title	Length
1.	"Wine, Women, and Song"	3:15
2.	"Cream and Bastards Rise"	3:17
3.	"Moral Centralia"	4:27
4.	"Little Round Mirrors"	5:15
5.	"Happiness Writes White"	3:09
6.	"Incommunicado"	2:16
7.	"Cool James"	3:26
8.	"What You Live By"	3:04
9.	"War Buddies"	4:25
10.	"Diminishing Returns"	5:13
Total length:		37:48

Disc two
No.	Title	Length
1.	"I Missed It"	4:29
2.	"Picture, Picture"	3:32
3.	"Cream and Bastards Rise" (writing snippet)	0:57
4.	"Elvis, I Don't Love You Anymore"	3:02
5.	"Cold Snap"	4:29
6.	"Little Round Mirrors" (writing snippet)	1:47
7.	"Moral Centralia" (demo)	5:25
8.	"Cream and Bastards Reprise"	4:25
9.	"The Piano Lesson" (hidden track)	0:32
Total length:		28:38

=== Kill Rock Stars release (2006) ===
Disc one
No.	Title	Length
1.	"Wine, Women, and Song"	3:15
2.	"Cream and Bastards Rise"	3:17
3.	"Moral Centralia"	4:27
4.	"Little Round Mirrors"	5:15
5.	"Happiness Writes White"	3:09
6.	"War Buddies"	4:25
7.	"Cool James"	3:26
8.	"Picture, Picture"	3:32
9.	"What You Live By"	3:04
10.	"Diminishing Returns"	5:13
Total length:		39:03

Disc two
No.	Title	Length
1.	"I Missed It"	4:29
2.	"Elvis, I Don't Love You Anymore"	3:02
3.	"Incommunicado"	2:16
4.	"Cream and Bastards Rise" (writing snippet)	0:57
5.	"Cold Snap"	4:29
6.	"Little Round Mirrors" (writing snippet)	1:47
7.	"Moral Centralia" (demo)	5:25
8.	"Cream and Bastards Reprise"	4:25
9.	"The Piano Lesson" (hidden track)	0:32
Total length:		27:22

== Personnel ==
Personnel per liner notes.

=== Musicians ===
Harvey Danger:

- Aaron Huffman – Bass, guitar, design
- Jeff J. Lin – Guitar, piano, string and horn arrangements
- Sean Nelson – vocals
- Michael Welke – drums

Additional musicians:

- Rachel Bowman – Backing vocals
- Jacob Hoffman – Backing vocals, French horn
- John Roderick – Guitar
- Greg Powers – Trombone
- Steve Creswell – Viola
- Phil Peterson – Cello

=== Production ===
- John Goodmanson – Production, engineering, mixing
- Steve Fisk – Production, engineering, mixing, ARP
- Justin Armstrong – Assistant engineering
- Scotty Crane – Assistant engineering
- Greg Calbi – Mastering
- Ed Brooks – Mastering
- YTJE – Artwork
- Ryan Schierling – Photography
- Erik Speckman – Encoding and IT

== Release history ==
Release history for Little by Little...
Region	Date	Label	Format	Ref.
United States	September 13, 2005	Phonographic Records (Phono 02)	2xCD	
Various	September 20, 2005	Self-released (Harvey Danger's website)	BitTorrent	
Various	September 27, 2005	Self-released (Harvey Danger's website)	DD	
United States	April 1, 2006	Skrocki Records (SKR007)	LP	
United States	July 25, 2006	Kill Rock Stars (KRS471)	2xCD	
