= Future Soundtrack for America =

Compilation album

Compilation album by Various artists
- Released: August 17, 2004
- Recorded: Various
- Genre: Alternative, indie rock, folk, hip hop
- Label: Barsuk Records
- Producer: Various

Professional ratings
Review scores
Source	Rating
Rolling Stone	link
Allmusic	link
Pitchfork Media	(7.4/10) link

Future Soundtrack for America is a benefit album for Music for America and MoveOn.org released in 2004 by Barsuk Records and McSweeney's and compiled by Spike Jonze and They Might Be Giants' founding member John Flansburgh. The CD bore the assertion that "100% of our profits from this CD will go to non-profit progressive organizations working to involve more Americans in our political process, to advocate for ordinary people and traditional American values, and to help keep the United States a country all of us can be proud of. Thank you for your support." Most songs were either exclusive to this compilation album or rare at the time it was released. The CD was also included in The Future Dictionary of America, published simultaneously by McSweeney's.

At a They Might Be Giants concert at The Catalyst in Santa Cruz, California, the night before its release, Flansburgh had this to say about the album: "We made some very, very cold, cold calls to our...fake, fake rock friends that we don't even know, to talk them into being on this thing, ladies and gentlemen." He then added, "One more thing: If you're not registered to vote, what's up with that?"

== Track listing ==
No.	Title	Writer(s)	Performer	Length
1.	"This Will Be Our Year" (The Zombies cover)	Chris White	OK Go	2:05
2.	"Ain't Got So Far to Go"	David Byrne	David Byrne	4:07
3.	"Game of Pricks (BBC Evening Session)" (Guided by Voices cover)	Robert Pollard	Jimmy Eat World	1:53
4.	"This Temporary Life"	Benjamin Gibbard, Nick Harmer, Jason McGerr, Chris Walla	Death Cab for Cutie	4:37
5.	"I Miss You" (James Guthrie mix)	Travis Barker, Tom DeLonge, Mark Hoppus	Blink-182	4:26
6.	"Move On"	Mike Doughty	Mike Doughty	4:14
7.	"Jerry Falwell Destroyed Earth"	Ben Kweller	Ben Kweller	1:22
8.	"Off with Your Head"	Carrie Brownstein, Corin Tucker, Janet Weiss	Sleater-Kinney	2:27
9.	"Final Straw" (MoveOn mix)	Peter Buck, Mike Mills, Michael Stipe	R.E.M.	4:07
10.	"Going for the Gold" (live, probably Feb. 24, 2004, Loew's Jersey Theatre, Jersey City, NJ)	Conor Oberst	Bright Eyes	5:46
11.	"The Commander Thinks Aloud" (Future Mix)	John Roderick	The Long Winters	4:20
12.	"Money" (feat. Huck Fynn, Oezlem, and the Horn Dogs)	William Adams	will.i.am of The Black Eyed Peas	4:10
13.	"Tippecanoe and Tyler Too" (a campaign song from the US presidential election of 1840)	Alexander Coffman Ross (lyrics)	They Might Be Giants	1:39
14.	"The Ballad of David Icke"	Eef Barzelay	Clem Snide	1:51
15.	"Date with the Night" (live, March 17, 2004, The Fillmore, San Francisco, CA)	Yeah Yeah Yeahs	Yeah Yeah Yeahs	3:03
16.	"Everything's Ruined" (acoustic)	Chris Collingwood, Adam Schlesinger	Fountains of Wayne	2:22
17.	"Your Legs Grow"	Matthew Caws, Ira Elliot, Daniel Lorca	Nada Surf	2:45
18.	"Yoshimi Battles the Pink Robots" (live on the BBC)	Wayne Coyne, Steven Drozd, Dave Fridmann, Michael Ivins	The Flaming Lips	3:29
19.	"Northern Line"	David Roback, Kendra Smith	Old 97's	4:24
20.	"Sam Stone" (John Prine cover)	John Prine	Laura Cantrell	4:44
21.	"Day After Tomorrow"	Tom Waits, Kathleen Brennan	Tom Waits	5:59
22.	"A Distorted Reality Is Now a Necessity to Be Free"	Elliott Smith	Elliott Smith	4:31
