= Setting the Paces =

Studio album by BOAT
- Released: October 27, 2009
- Genre: Indie Rock
- Length: 38:14
- Label: Magic Marker Records

BOAT chronology
Let's Drag Our Feet (2007)	Setting the Paces (2009)	Dress Like Your Idols (2011)

Setting the Paces was the third full-length album by indie rock band BOAT, released in 2009.

== Reception ==
Professional ratings
Review scores
Source	Rating
Allmusic	3.5/5 stars
Pitchfork Media	(7.5/10)

Setting the Paces received largely positive reviews from critics. Allmusic's Tim Sendra describes the album as having "debts owed to Pavement, Television Personalities, and the Banana Splits, and with a bouncy energy that makes the album very easy to like." Pitchfork Media's David Bevan claims the songs give "way to a full-blast power chord workout and on to a chuggable chorus... At the center of it all is one gooey, delicious hook... Every song is irrepressible in its own right."

== Track listing ==
1. "Friends Since 1989" – 2:31
2. "Lately... (I've Been on My Back)" – 3:11
3. "Tough Talking the Tulips" – 2:36
4. "Interstate 5" – 1:53
5. "100 Calorie Man" – 2:02
6. "We Want It! We Want It!" – 3:25
7. "The Name Tossers" – 3:55
8. "Jeff Fell Dream" – 1:41
9. "Prince of Tacoma" – 2:43
10. "God Save the Man, Who Isn't All That Super" – 3:04
11. "(Do the) Magic Centipede" – 2:07
12. "Calcium Commuter" – 2:49
13. "Reverie" – 2:34
14. "You're Muscular" – 3:43

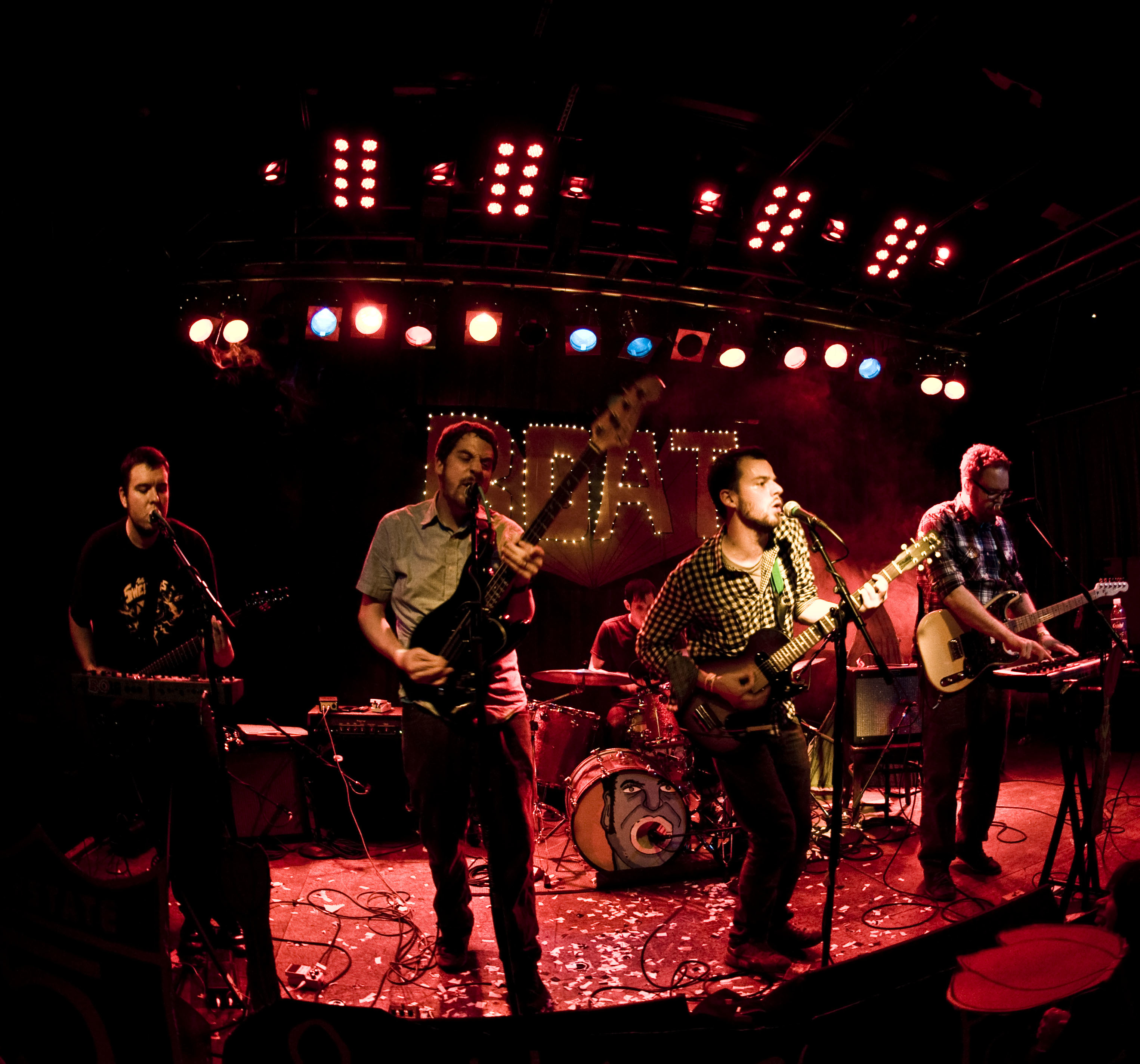
"Setting The Paces" Release Party. Neumos, Seattle, WA (10/22/09).

== Personnel ==
- D. Crane, vocals and guitar
- M. McKenzie, bass and guitar
- J. Goodman, multi-instrumentalist, percussion
- J. Long, drums, producer
- M. McKenzie, bass, guitar, vocals, bells
- R. Cancro, saxophone, vocals

Recording

- Jackson Justice Long, producer, recording, mixing (5, 8, 9, 12, 13, 14)
- Cam Nicklaus, mixing, recording
- John McCaig, mastering
