= Pretend to Be Brave =

Pretend To Be Brave

Studio album by BOAT
- Released: March 25, 2013
- Genre: Indie Rock
- Length: 32:26
- Label: Magic Marker Records

BOAT chronology
Dress Like Your Idols (2011)	Pretend To Be Brave (2013)

Pretend To Be Brave was the fifth full-length album by indie rock band BOAT, released in 2013. It was the follow-up to the band's 2011 album, Dress Like Your Idols.

== Reception ==
Professional ratings
Review scores
Source	Rating
Pitchfork Media	(6.8/10)

Pretend To Be Brave received largely positive reviews from critics. Pitchfork Media's Jamieson Cox called the album "a breezy, compact guitar pop record... surprisingly concerned with maturity and mortality, and this juxtaposition is the source of some of the album's finest moments" and compared the album's sound to The New Pornographers. KEXP claimed its "songs are reminiscent of the most pop-friendly side of Pavement, contrasting buoyant song hooks and infectious sing-a-long choruses with lovably self-effacing lyrics".

== Track listing ==
1. "Sharpshooters" – 2:28
2. "Inside an Aquarium" – 3:35
3. "Hating the Criminal" – 2:45
4. "Sore Toes and Elbows" – 2:02
5. "Pretend to Be Brave" – 2:50
6. "With the Sea at My Back" – 2:05
7. "Interstellar Helen Keller" – 3:55
8. "The Big, the Bright" – 2:33
9. "This Isn't How I Pictured It" – 2:32
10. "Problem Solvers" – 2:57
11. "Wave the White Flag" – 2:29
12. "Grind Like Gears" – 2:19

== Personnel ==
- D. Crane, vocals and guitar
- M. McKenzie, bass and guitar
- J. Goodman, guitar
- J. Angle, drums
