= Putting the Days to Bed =

Studio album by The Long Winters
- Released: July 25, 2006
- Genre: Indie rock
- Label: Barsuk Records
- Producer: John Roderick

The Long Winters chronology
Ultimatum (2005)	Putting the Days to Bed (2006)

Putting the Days to Bed is the third full-length studio album by indie rock band the Long Winters. It was released in the US by Barsuk Records and distributed in Europe by Munich Records in 2006. The album title is a lyric from the album track "Hindsight".

== Reception ==
Professional ratings
Review scores
Source	Rating
AllMusic	4/5 stars
Robert Christgau	(dud)
Pitchfork	7.7/10

Pitchfork described the album as "[missing] the masterful mark" but still "a solid effort—a step in a promising new direction" and "not so much power pop or even necessarily powerful pop—just powered up pop, all horns and echoes and toe-tapping parties", while Paste Magazine called it, "Roderick's strongest work to date".

Many reviews remark on Roderick's songwriting, calling him "a master storyteller", as well as the album's stylistic continuity despite the band's lineup changes. Keith Phipps, writing for the A.V. Club, said, "changing has meant growing into a band that's tougher to ignore than ever."

== Track listing ==
All tracks are written by John Roderick.

No.	Title	Length
1.	"Pushover"	2:38
2.	"Fire Island, AK"	3:42
3.	"Teaspoon"	2:54
4.	"Hindsight"	4:07
5.	"Sky is Open"	3:12
6.	"Honest"	3:52
7.	"Clouds"	3:34
8.	"Rich Wife"	3:56
9.	"Ultimatum"	3:06
10.	"(It's a) Departure"	3:04
11.	"Seven"	3:26
Total length:		37:31

International edition
No.	Title	Length
1.	"Rich Wife"	3:56
2.	"Pushover"	2:38
3.	"Fire Island, AK"	3:42
4.	"Teaspoon"	2:54
5.	"Ultimatum"	3:06
6.	"Sky is Open"	3:12
7.	"Clouds"	3:34
8.	"Honest"	3:52
9.	"Hindsight"	4:07
10.	"(It's a) Departure"	3:04
11.	"Seven"	3:26
12.	"The Commander Thinks Aloud" (†)	5:26
13.	"Ultimatum (acoustic)" (†)	3:38
14.	"Everything Is Talking" (†)	4:00
15.	"Delicate Hands" (†)	3:59
Total length:		54:34

Notes

- † denotes tracks originally released on the 2005 EP Ultimatum

== Personnel ==
The Long Winters

- John Roderick – guitar, vocals, piano, production
- Jonathan Rothman – guitar, keys
- Eric Corson – bass
- Nabil Ayers – drums

Additional musicians

- Chris Funk – additional instruments on "Honest"
- Chris Walla – additional instruments on "Honest"
- Kurt Bloch – guitar on "Ultimatum"

Additional personnel

- Floyd Rietsma – engineering
- John Goodmanson – mixing
- Ed Brooks – mastering

== Cover versions ==
In 2011, Chris Carrabba of Dashboard Confessional covered "The Commander Thinks Aloud" on his album Covered In The Flood.

== Use in other media ==
- The song "(It's A) Departure" served as the theme song to the comedy advice podcast My Brother, My Brother and Me from January 17, 2011 until 2021, as well as to the television series based on the podcast. Roderick since appeared on the podcast, as well as toured with the podcast's live shows and performed the song live to introduce the show. However, it was announced on January 3, 2021 that after a controversy involving Roderick on Twitter they would no longer be using the song.
