= Omnibus (podcast) =

American history podcast

- Genre: History, Archival
- Language: English

Cast and voices
- Hosted by: John Roderick; Ken Jennings (2017–2025)

Publication
- Original release: December 2017 – present

Omnibus is a podcast hosted by John Roderick which launched in December 2017. It was cohosted by Ken Jennings until 2025. In each week's episode, Roderick and a guest host offer an in-depth discussion of one particular strange-but-true story or niche cultural trend.

== Format and content ==
The show employs the conceit that it is a "time capsule" of information to be preserved for survivors of an unspecified apocalypse in the long-distant future, frequently referring tongue-in-cheek to its "far future listeners". Fans of the show are dubbed "Futurelings". The show is relatively loose-form and conversation-based, with the hosts often intentionally taking a large portion of the episode before reaching the title content.

As of September 2026, over 720 episodes have been released, with topics such as the 2021 salmon chaos incident, space contraband, the historicity of the ancient Oracle of Delphi, and the 2011 monkey selfie copyright dispute. The podcast also records monthly "Addenda" episodes, available to Patreon members, where the hosts respond to emails from listeners.

== Production ==
On August 9, 2019, the podcast announced its separation from iHeartRadio, and shifted to a Patreon-funded model. On January 1, 2023, the podcast decreased from twice weekly to once a week, citing the time required for Jennings' work as Jeopardy! host.

On September 30, 2025, it was announced that Ken Jennings would be leaving the podcast as a regular co-host, due to his Jeopardy! commitments. He is set to remain as an executive producer of Omnibus and occasional guest host.

Jennings did his final performance live on November 8th, 2025, in Seattle. Since then, the remaining host, John, has begun weekly episodes with one-off listeners and friends as the co-host, with Ken returning for occasional episodes like "Grit" and "The Phantom Time Hypothesis".
