= Where Have All the Merrymakers Gone? =

Studio album by Harvey Danger
- Released: July 29, 1997
- Recorded: March; June 1996; February 1997
- Studios: John & Stu's Place (Seattle, Washington)
- Genres: Indie rock; power pop; pop punk
- Length: 42:56
- Labels: Arena Rock; Slash; London
- Producers: John Goodmanson · Harvey Danger

Harvey Danger chronology
Harvey Danger (1996)	Where Have All the Merrymakers Gone? (1997)	King James Version (2000)

Singles from Where Have All the Merrymakers Gone?
- 1. "Flagpole Sitta" Released: April 27, 1998; 2. "Private Helicopter" Released: October 13, 1998

Where Have All the Merrymakers Gone? is the debut studio album by American rock band Harvey Danger. It was initially released on July 29, 1997, through the independent record label the Arena Rock Recording Company. The second song on the album, "Flagpole Sitta", received extensive airplay in the United States and resulted in the band's fame. As the song gained national attention, the album was picked up and reissued by Slash Records, a label associated with London Records. On July 29, 2014, 17 years to the day after the album's initial release, Where Have All the Merrymakers Gone? was re-released, for the first time as a vinyl LP, by No Sleep Records. The album has been described by Fuse as "a definitive indie power pop punk record at a time and place where grunge reigned supreme".

The album title comes from a line in the song "Radio Silence", which itself may have been inspired by a line from the Paul Newman film Harper. "Private Helicopter" was released to radio on October 13, 1998.

== Recording and production ==
Where Have All the Merrymakers Gone? was recorded over three different sessions with John Goodmanson at John & Stu's Place in Seattle, Washington. "Private Helicopter", "Terminal Annex", and "Carjack Fever" were recorded on March 16, 1996, and released on a commercially produced cassette tape, titled simply Harvey Danger, which was sold by the band at their shows and sent to music industry professionals. Three more songs ("Flagpole Sitta", "Woolly Muffler", and "Wrecking Ball") were recorded at the June 1996 session and sent on a one-off cassette tape to Slash/London Records at the request of Greg Glover, an intern who was convinced on the strength of the recordings that he should fund a full album. All of the recordings, except one ("Carjack Fever"), became Where Have All the Merrymakers Gone? The total cost of the recording was about $3,000. "Carjack Fever" was later reworked into "(Theme from) Carjack Fever" for the band's next album, King James Version (2000).

== Critical reception ==
Professional ratings
Review scores
Source	Rating
AllMusic	3.5/5 stars
NME	6/10
Pitchfork	7.5/10
Rolling Stone	2/5 stars

The Edmonton Journal deemed the album "an effortless fusion of crystalline Elvis Costello songcraft, roaring indie-rock guitars, a big rhythm section and smart, smart-ass lyrics."

== Track listing ==
All lyrics are written by Harvey Danger; all music is composed by Harvey Danger.

No.	Title	Recorded	Length
1.	"Carlotta Valdez"	February 1997	2:44
2.	"Flagpole Sitta"	June 1996	3:35
3.	"Woolly Muffler"	June 1996	4:30
4.	"Private Helicopter"	March 1996	3:31
5.	"Problems and Bigger Ones"	February 1997	5:41
6.	"Jack the Lion"	February 1997	5:30
7.	"Old Hat"	February 1997	3:48
8.	"Terminal Annex"	March 1996	3:43
9.	"Wrecking Ball"	June 1996	4:39
10.	"Radio Silence" (includes hidden track (Note: "Radio Silence" after 5:15 includes a hidden track--a partial recording of "Carjack Fever" played backwards))	February 1997	8:26
Total length:			42:56

== Personnel ==
Adapted credits from the album's media notes.

Band

- Sean Nelson – vocals, keyboards
- Jeff J. Lin – guitar, organ, violin, backing vocals
- Aaron Huffman – bass, cover design
- Evan Sult – drums

Additional and production

- Abby Grush – Backing vocals
- John Goodmanson – production, engineering, mixing
- Harvey Danger – production
- Greg Calbi – mastering
- Chuck Robertson – photography

== Certifications ==
Region	Certification	Certified units/sales
United States (RIAA)	Gold	500,000^{^}
^{^} Shipments figures based on certification alone.

== Release history ==
Release history for Where Have All the Merrymakers Gone?
Region	Date	Label	Format	Ref.
United States	July 29, 1997	The Arena Rock Recording Company	CD (1st pressing, 1,200 copies)	
United States	February 5, 1998	The Arena Rock Recording Company	CD (2nd pressing, 500 copies)	
United States	March 31, 1998	Slash; London	CD; cassette	
Canada	April 7, 1998	Slash; London	CD; cassette	
France	July 27, 1998	Barclay Records	CD; cassette	
United Kingdom	August 3, 1998	Slash; London	CD; cassette	
United States	July 29, 2014	No Sleep Records	LP	
