= Sean Nelson =

American singer-songwriter (born 1972/73)

- Sean Nelson at the 2015 EMP Pop Conference

Background information
- Born: Sean Nelson
- Origin: Seattle, Washington, United States
- Genres: Alternative rock, indie rock
- Occupations: Musician, singer, filmmaker, journalist, music critic
- Instruments: Vocals, keyboards
- Years active: 1993–present

Sean Nelson (born 1972 or 1973) is an American musician and journalist. He was the lead singer of the alternative rock group Harvey Danger and was a writer and editor for alternative weekly publication The Stranger from 1996 to 2018.

== Music career ==
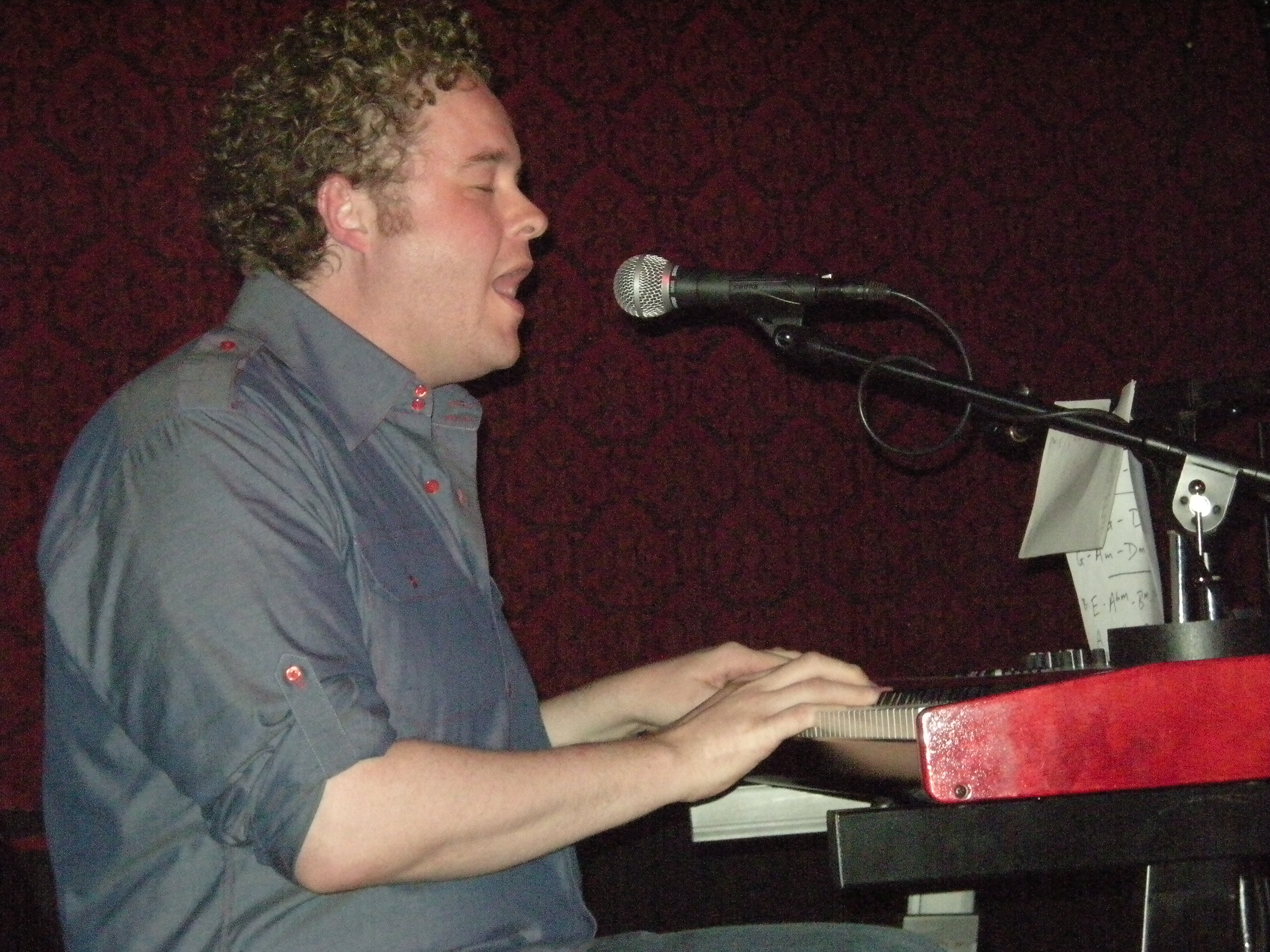
Sean Nelson (2009)

Nelson joined Harvey Danger in 1993 and played with the band through to its farewell show in 2009. In addition to being the band's lead singer, he was also its songwriter and keyboardist. The band's debut album Where Have All the Merrymakers Gone? was released in 1997 and was certified Gold by the RIAA for sales of 500,000 copies. The album contained the hit single "Flagpole Sitta", which was featured in the 1999 film American Pie and was later used as the theme song for the British sitcom Peep Show.

In 2001, Nelson formed a second band, The Long Winters, with John Roderick. He left the band in 2004, and Roderick has continued the group as a largely solo effort.

Nelson has also recorded and performed with Death Cab for Cutie, The Decemberists, Robyn Hitchcock, Nada Surf, The Minus 5, and others. In 2006, he recorded Nelson Sings Nilsson, an album of songs by the late American composer Harry Nilsson, accompanied by a 25-piece-orchestra. Nelson was also a member of the short-lived side project The Vernacular, along with Chris Walla and Nathan Good of Death Cab For Cutie.

On June 4, 2013, Nelson released his first official batch of recordings to bear his name, Make Good Choices, which includes contributions from Chris Walla (Death Cab for Cutie), Peter Buck (R.E.M./Minus 5), Matt Pence & Scott Danbom (Centro-Matic), Howard Draper (Shearwater), Dave Depper (Loch Lomond, Fruit Bats), Rachel Blumberg (The Decemberists/M. Ward), Adam Selzer (Norfolk & Western), Steve Fisk (player: Pell Mell, Pigeonhed; producer: Nirvana, Beat Happening, Unwound), and others. Sessions arose over the course of several years between Nelson and his collaborators' other projects.

In June 2019, Nelson released the decades-in-the-making album of Harry Nilsson covers, titled "Nelson Sings Nilsson," a play on Nilsson's classic album of Randy Newman covers, Nilsson Sings Newman.

In December 2019, Sean released the "Viral Love" 7" which contained the first song released from a new full-length album he made with producer Shane Tutmarc. The b-side contained an alternate version of Harvey Danger's "Carlotta Valdez" entitled "Carlotta Valdes [sic] (Texas Version)".

== Writing career ==
Nelson joined the staff of the Seattle alternative weekly newspaper The Stranger in 1996 while still a member of Harvey Danger. Aside from writing, he held several positions at the publication, including web editor, film editor, copy editor, associate editor, and arts editor. He left The Stranger in 2018, moving to Nashville, TN to take another job.

In 2006, Nelson published his first book, an entry in the 33⅓ series on Joni Mitchell's Court and Spark. His essay "Dead Man Talking" was published in the Da Capo anthology Best Music Writing 2008.

In addition to his writing work, Nelson taught a songwriting class at the University of Washington Extension and co-hosted Audioasis on KEXP-FM for five years.

In 2024, Nelson began hosting the Nebula-exclusive podcast The Wonder of It All, focused on "about the blessings and curses of success", with interview subjects including Adam Duritz, John Hodgman, DC Pierson, Jacob Slichter, and Lena Hall.

== Film career ==
In 2008, Nelson co-wrote and played a supporting role in Humpday director Lynn Shelton's third feature film My Effortless Brilliance, which enjoyed a successful run on the film festival circuit and was released on DVD by IFC Films in November 2009. He has also acted in David Russo's cult film festival hit The Immaculate Conception of Little Dizzle and alongside Dax Shepard in Katie Aselton's The Freebie, which was released in September 2010.

== Selected discography ==
(as harmony vocalist, except where noted)

=== Sean Nelson ===
(lead singer, songwriter*)

- Make Good Choices (Really Records, 2013)
- Nelson Sings Nilsson (2019) *Album of Harry Nilsson covers
- Viral Love b/w Carlotta Valdez Goes to Texas 7" (2019)

=== Harvey Danger ===
(lead singer, keyboards, songwriter)

- Where Have All the Merrymakers Gone? (Universal, 1997)
- King James Version (Warner, 2000)
- Sometimes You Have To Work on Christmas (Sometimes) EP (Phonographic Records, 2004)
- Little By Little… (Kill Rock Stars, 2005)
- Cream and Bastards Rise EP (Kill Rock Stars, 2006)
- Little Round Mirrors EP (Barsuk, 2007)
- Burn to Shine (V/A Trixie DVD, 2008)
- Dead Sea Scrolls (Phonographic Records, 2009)

=== The Long Winters ===
- The Worst You Can Do is Harm (Barsuk, 2001)
- When I Pretend to Fall (Barsuk, 2003)
- Putting the Days to Bed (Barsuk, 2005)

=== Nada Surf ===
- The Weight is a Gift (Barsuk, 2006)
- Lucky (Barsuk, 2008)
