= Harvey Danger =

American rock band

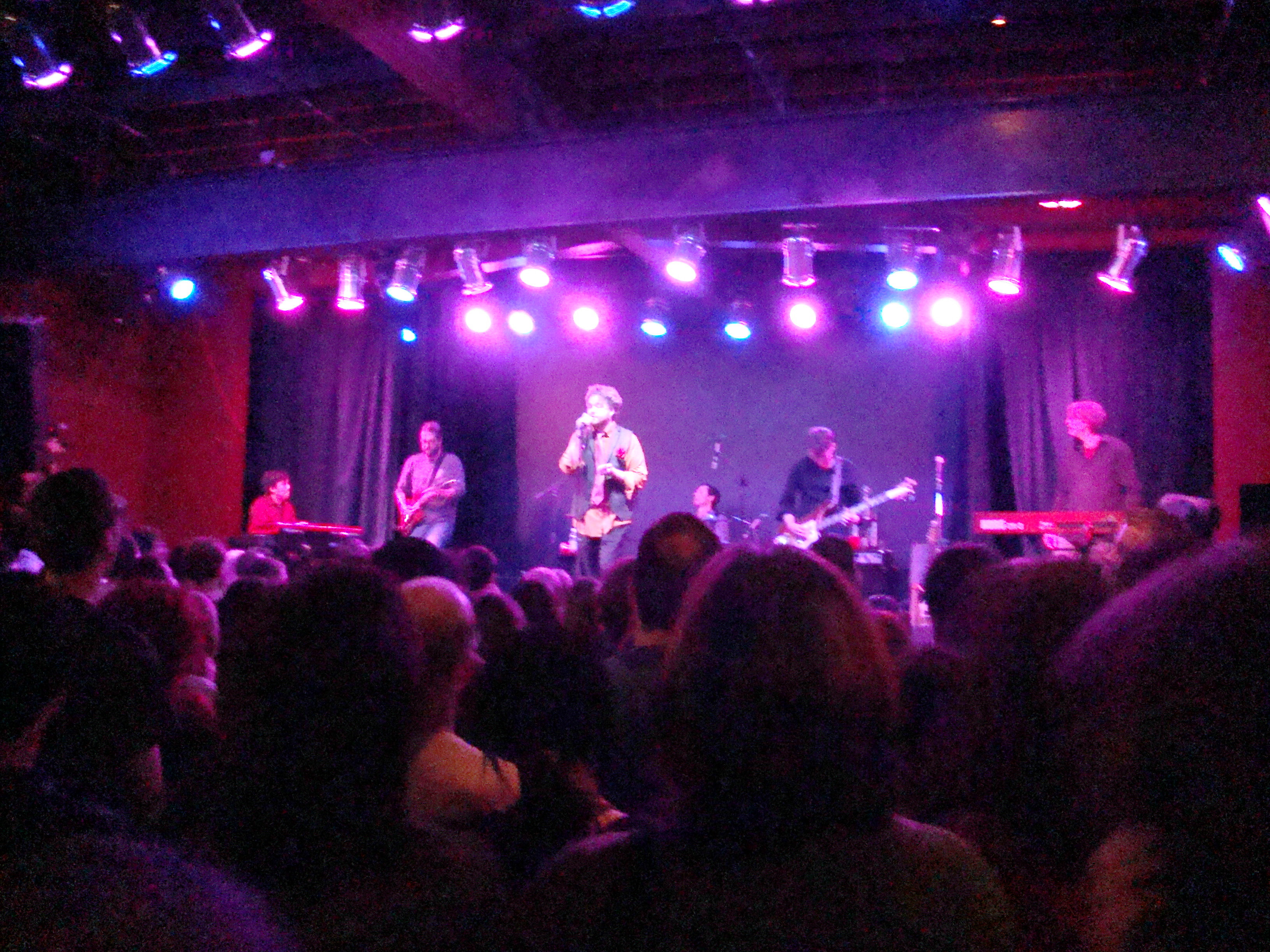
- Harvey Danger playing their final show in 2009

Background information
- Origin: Seattle, Washington, U.S.
- Genres: Alternative rock; indie rock; power pop; pop-punk; geek rock
- Years active: 1992–2001; 2004–2009
- Labels: Arena Rock; Slash; London; PolyGram; London-Sire; Phonographic; Barsuk; Kill Rock Stars; No Sleep
- Past members: Sean Nelson; Jeff J. Lin; Aaron Huffman; Michael Welke; Rob Knop; Ken Hunt; Dan Fineman; Evan Sult; Mike Squires; John Roderick
- Website: harveydanger.com

Harvey Danger was an American alternative rock band formed in Seattle, Washington, in 1992. After being founded by bassist Aaron Huffman and guitarist Jeff J. Lin, who were both journalism students at the University of Washington, drummer Evan Sult and singer Sean Nelson were brought into the band in 1993, solidifying its lineup for the remainder of their initial existence.

After performing a variety of shows in the local area and recording a number of demos with producer John Goodmanson, Harvey Danger released their debut album, Where Have All the Merrymakers Gone? (1997) through the Arena Rock Recording Company. Although the album was not a success initially, its second track, "Flagpole Sitta", began receiving nationwide radio airplay and, soon after, the band signed with Slash Records, a subsidiary of the major label London Recordings. Slash/London reissued Where Have All the Merrymakers Gone? and "Flagpole Sitta" as a single in April 1998 to widespread commercial success, with the album eventually becoming certified Gold by the Recording Industry Association of America (RIAA) in 1999. However, the band grew increasingly uncomfortable with their association with "Flagpole Sitta" and their perceived status as a one-hit wonder, and sought to distance themselves from the song and their early lo-fi sound with their subsequent musical output.

Following a series of corporate restructurings that saw the band change record labels, Harvey Danger issued their second studio album, King James Version (2000), which showed the band moving in a more artistic direction influenced by the works of Radiohead and Frederic Tuten. Although its sole single "Sad Sweetheart of the Rodeo" became a minor hit, the album performed very poorly commercially, and its failure led to the band breaking up in April 2001. It has since attracted a cult following.

Nelson, Huffman and Lin reformed Harvey Danger in April 2004, with Michael Welke replacing Sult on drums. In 2005, the band issued their third and final album, Little by Little..., which featured a more piano-driven sound. The band's decision to release the album as a free BitTorrent/download through their website attracted significant attention and helped renew the band's popularity. On May 28, 2009, Harvey Danger announced that they had amicably decided to disband, and the band played its final show at the Crocodile Cafe in Seattle on August 29, 2009.

== History ==
=== Early years (1992–1995) ===
Harvey Danger began in 1992 with University of Washington classmates Jeff Lin and Aaron Huffman deciding "it might be fun to start a band." Huffman and Lin, who were both student journalists on the staff of The Daily of the University of Washington student newspaper, took the name "Harvey Danger" from a phrase graffitied onto the wall of the newspaper's office. Lin and Huffman played house parties and bars as a duo under the Harvey Danger name until 1993, when they invited Evan Sult to be their drummer. Despite his complete lack of drumming experience, Sult agreed, bringing along his own similarly inexperienced classmate Sean Nelson. Nelson was also a colleague of Lin and Huffman at The Daily's arts and entertainment section The Glass Onion.

The foursome played their first show on April 21, 1994, at the now-defunct Lake Union Pub; Sult and Nelson, both under 21, were only permitted entry during the set. That summer, the band moved into Nelson's student house together and began holding band practices in the basement. More shows at the Lake Union Pub and other low-rent Seattle clubs followed, leading to exposure in The Seattle Times.

As the band began playing more shows at increasingly reputable venues, their songwriting gained momentum. In 1994, the band produced a six-song demo tape, sold at shows for $3.

=== Merrymakers and initial success (1996–1998) ===
When three-quarters of the group became unemployed in 1996, they decided to devote yet more attention to the band, moving to another house and renting a rehearsal space. Their shows continued to improve, and the band became regular weekend performers at the Crocodile Cafe.

The band recorded a three-track demo tape with producer John Goodmanson, which failed to draw attention from major labels, but found its way to Greg Glover, a London Records intern who ran his own small label, The Arena Rock Recording Company, Glover expressed interest in releasing a 7" single, and Harvey Danger provided him with an additional three songs—including "Flagpole Sitta"—also recorded with Goodmanson. On the strength of these, Glover agreed to bankroll a full-length album.

In 1996, shortly before the band's national success, Nelson was hired as a reporter for The Stranger newspaper in Seattle. Nelson opted to balance his journalism and music careers, and he continued to write and edit for the newspaper until 2018.

The group was working on their first album between March and June 1996. Where Have All the Merrymakers Gone? was released July 29, 1997, to local critical acclaim. The record performed well on college radio charts, and it sold steadily in Seattle and New York, among other cities. By late 1997, however, the band felt as though the record had lost its momentum and the group began to contemplate breaking up. Shortly before taking January 1998 off to contemplate their future, Nelson gave a copy of Merrymakers to KNDD DJ Marco Collins. Within weeks, "Flagpole Sitta" had become KNDD's most-requested song. The band toured extensively from March through December 1998, playing headlining and support gigs with some of the most popular artists of the year and appearing at many radio festivals. Influential L.A. radio station KROQ-FM picked the track up, and stations across the country shortly followed suit. When Greg Glover of The Arena Rock Recording Company was hired at Slash Records, a subsidiary of London Recordings, Harvey Danger were signed to the label. "Flagpole Sitta" made Billboard magazine's Top 40 and appeared in a number of films and television shows. Its video got heavy rotation on MTV and VH1. The song also became famous globally as one of the most memorable songs featured in the film American Pie, despite not being on the official retail soundtrack. It also appeared in the movie Disturbing Behavior and its trailer. More recently, the song was used as the opening theme to the British sitcom Peep Show for the second series and onwards. In August 2019, "Flagpole Sitta" was ranked No. 25 on Rolling Stone's "50 Best Songs of the Nineties" list.

The band had wanted to release the song "Carlotta Valdez" as the follow-up single to "Flagpole Sitta", but they were overruled by Slash Records, who released "Private Helicopter" as a single instead in the fall of 1998. The single received lukewarm reception and did not reach any Billboard music chart. In December 1998, Harvey Danger began writing songs for their follow-up album.

=== Delays and King James Version (1999–2001) ===
Harvey Danger began production of their second album in March 1999 at Albert Grossman's Bearsville Studios, near Woodstock, New York. Slash/London was unusually uninvolved in the recording process, a harbinger of what was to come. After three weeks of recording at Bearsville and several more weeks of recording and mixing in Seattle and Los Angeles, the band submitted the record, King James Version, to their label, and waited. What the band refers to as "elaborate corporate reshuffling" began almost immediately after they finished their album: mergers and acquisitions among record labels left them and their record in limbo for over a year, not knowing to whom they were signed, nor when KJV would be released.

Attempts to release the album on then-fledgling indie label Barsuk Records fell through due to legal complications, a tour with the Pretenders fell through due to lack of label support, and, just when the band was about to give up, newly reorganized London-Sire Records released King James Version on September 12, 2000. Reviews were strong, but buzz was almost nonexistent: sales of the album were slow, and the single "Sad Sweetheart of the Rodeo" performed poorly on radio and MTV. For the album's supporting tour, Nevada Bachelors guitarist Mike Squires was added as the group's live guitarist as well as the Western State Hurricanes founder John Roderick on keyboard. Roderick would later fill in on bass when Huffman fell ill, days before a performance on The Late Late Show with Craig Kilborn.

=== Hiatus and reunion (2001–2004) ===
Harvey Danger played a "final" show in Portland on April 21, 2001, seven years to the day after their first show, and quietly disbanded for an undetermined period.

During the hiatus Jeff Lin returned to school, Evan Sult relocated to Chicago and joined the band Bound Stems and Aaron Huffman formed the group Love Hotel. Sean Nelson recorded and toured with The Long Winters, the group formed by former Harvey Danger live member John Roderick, and worked on solo material, sometimes with Lin and Huffman (actually recording several unreleased songs, among them covers of songs written by Harry Nilsson for a future release entitled Nelson Sings Nilsson, eventually released in 2019 without Lin and Huffman's contributions). He wrote for the weekly alternative Seattle newspaper, The Stranger; and became a partner in Barsuk Records and a DJ for Seattle's KEXP-FM. The idea of reforming Harvey Danger was raised several times, but rejected.

In 2004, Nelson, Huffman, and Lin entered a studio together for the first time in three years to record two new song ideas, with Nada Surf's Ira Elliot accompanying on drums. The session went so well that the trio agreed to begin writing music together—with "no strings attached." Sult, busy in Chicago, was unable to return, but sent his blessing for Harvey Danger's reincarnation.

April 21, 2004, saw both the tenth anniversary of Harvey Danger and their first show since 2001, in Seattle. With Nada Surf opening and Elliot again filling in on drums, the show also previewed songs that would be part of the new album: "Moral Centralia," "Wine, Women, and Song," and "War Buddies." The band recruited Seattle-based drummer Michael Welke, formalized their return as a band, and performed with their new lineup at the Bumbershoot Festival in Seattle in the summer of 2004. The year ended with the self-release of a five-song EP, Sometimes You Have to Work on Christmas (Sometimes). The EP contained demos for "Wine, Women, and Song" and "Pike St./Park Slope", a live version of "Jack the Lion" from The Crocodile Cafe, and two rare songs released only on special collections previously.

=== Little by Little... and breakup (2005–2009) ===
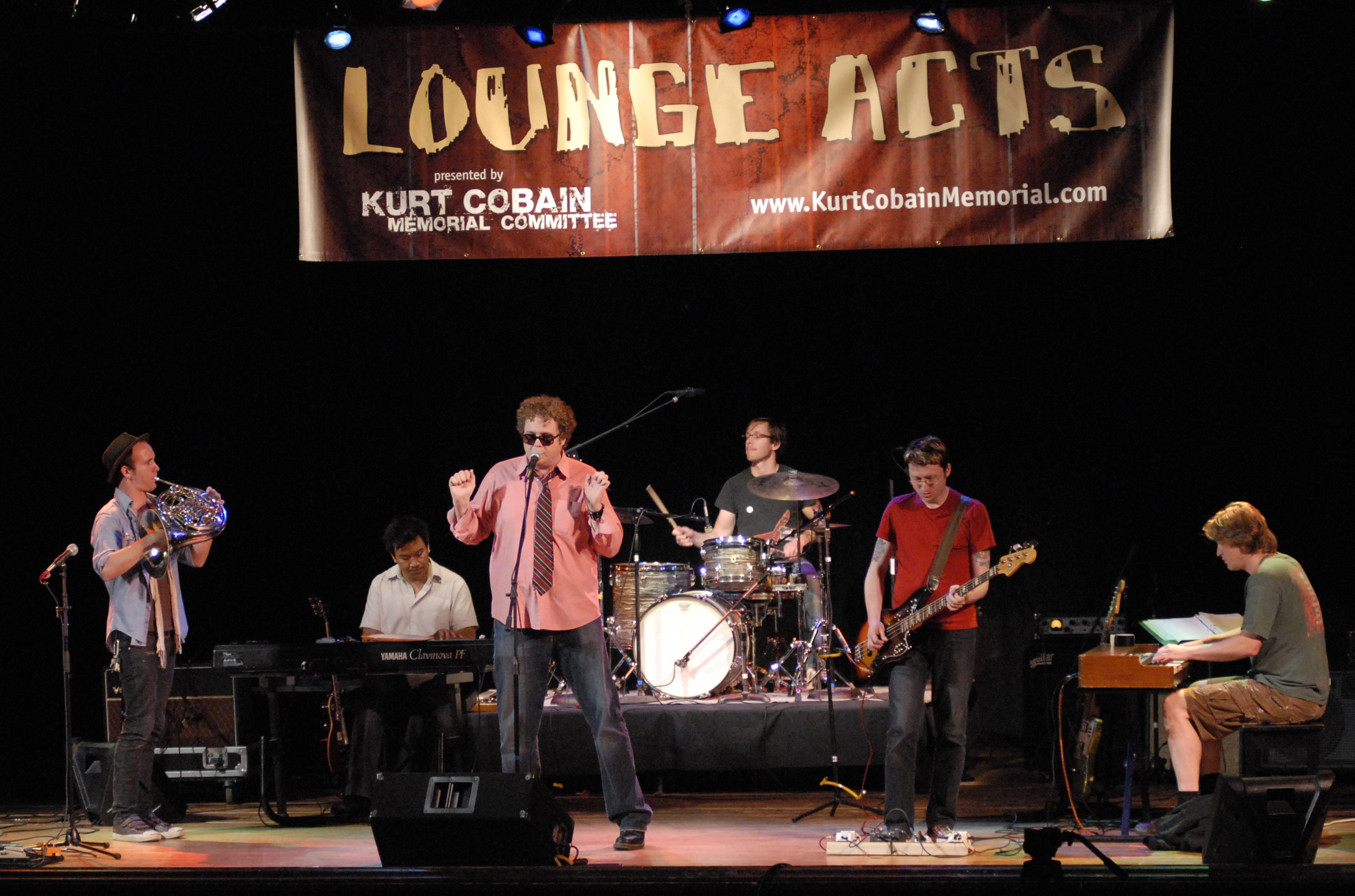
Harvey Danger in Hoquiam, WA in 2008.

In January 2005, Harvey Danger entered Robert Lang Studios to record their third album. Joining them again was Goodmanson, accompanied by Steve Fisk. The recording process ran smoothly, and Little by Little... was released on September 13, 2005, five years and one day after King James Version.

Citing "a long-held sense that the practice now being demonized by the music biz as 'illegal' file sharing can be a friend to the independent musician," Harvey Danger released their third album, Little by Little..., as a free download via BitTorrent a week after its release, and directly from the band's website a week after that. Within two months of release, the album had been downloaded 100,000 times, while the first pressing of physical copies (packaged with a disc of bonus material) had nearly sold out.

Reviews of the album were mixed. Pitchfork Media gave the album 6.9 (of a possible 10); AllMusic granted 3.5 (of a possible 5); PopMatters wrote: "If Where Have All the Merrymakers Gone is a rebellious kid kicking over trashcans in his neighborhood, then Little by Little seems to be that kid all grown up, taking out the trash, putting the lid on tightly, getting in his Jetta, and driving to work." Treble.com wrote: "Little by Little is one of the most pleasantly surprising albums of the year and one that truly displays the intricate and clever songwriting of a band in its prime." Threeimaginarygirls.com said: "Little By Little... deals with complex issues like politics, religion, and relationships on an intelligent level that's both challenging and accessible." The album's first single, "Cream and Bastards Rise," made Rolling Stone's "Hot List." It was also released as a downloadable song for the "Rock Band" video game series on October 7, 2008.

On July 25, 2006, Olympia-based label Kill Rock Stars re-released Little by Little... with a slightly altered track listing (songs on the bonus disc and main album swapped places). This release was much more widely available, and the band set out on its first national tour in five years in support of the album. On October 10, 2006, Barsuk Records released Little Round Mirrors as a maxi-single/EP with four B-sides.

On May 28, 2009, the band announced, "After 15 years, three albums, hundreds of shows, and far more twists and turns than we ever imagined possible, we've decided to put Harvey Danger to rest. The decision is totally mutual and utterly amicable." Harvey Danger played eight farewell shows in August, the last three of them in Seattle. The band closed with the last song it wrote, "The Show Must Not Go On".

=== Post-breakup (2009–present) ===
Since the band's breakup, Nelson continued to write and edit for The Stranger alternative weekly newspaper, which he had done for most of the duration of the band's career, until 2018. He now lives in Nashville, TN. He occasionally performs as a solo artist, having released the album Make Good Choices in 2013 and Nelson Sings Nilsson, an album of Harry Nilsson covers in 2019.

Jeff J. Lin works as a tech entrepreneur, having founded the photo sharing site Momento 360 in 2015. Evan Sult is now based in New York City and since 2013 has drummed for the indie rock duo Sleepy Kitty. Founding bassist Aaron Huffman died of respiratory failure due to cystic fibrosis on March 6, 2016, at age 43. His death was reported in The Stranger by Nelson.

In 2011, Harvey Danger released The Dead Sea Scrolls B-side collection and final single "The Show Must Not Go On" for free on their website.

Where Have All the Merrymakers Gone? was released on vinyl for the first time on July 29, 2014, by the independent label No Sleep Records. The packaging for the Where Have All the Merrymakers Gone? re-issue LP features new artwork, designed by Huffman, Sult and Nelson, using the iconic house from the original cover art now updated to reflect the passage of time, now surrounded by freeways and skyscrapers.

Barsuk Records released King James Version on vinyl for the first time on Record Store Day 2025 to celebrate the 25th anniversary of the album.

== Musical style ==
Harvey Danger's musical style has been described as alternative rock, indie rock, power pop, pop-punk and geek rock.

== Band members ==
Final lineup
- Jeff J. Lin – guitar, piano, keyboards, violin, backing vocals (1992–2009)
- Aaron Huffman – bass guitar, guitar (1992–2009; died 2016)
- Sean Nelson – lead vocals, keyboards (1993–2009)
- Michael Welke – drums, percussion (2004–2009)
- Rob Knop – keyboards (2005–2009)
Past members
- Ken Hunt – drums, percussion (1992)
- Dan Fineman – drums, percussion (1992–1993)
- Evan Sult – drums, percussion (1993–2001)

Touring musicians

- Mike Squires – guitar (2000–2001)
- John Roderick – keyboards, bass (2000–2001)

== Discography ==
=== Demo tapes ===
- Harvey Danger (1994) - Self-released.
- Harvey Danger (1996) - Self-released.

=== Studio albums ===
List of studio albums, with selected chart positions and sales figures
Title	Details	Peak chart positions		Certifications
Title	Details	US	US Heat.	Certifications
Where Have All the Merrymakers Gone?	Released: July 29, 1997; Label: Arena Rock (AR-006); Format: CD, CS, LP	70	2	RIAA: Gold
King James Version	Released: September 12, 2000; Label: London-Sire (31143-2); Format: CD	—	—	
Little by Little...	Released: September 13, 2005; Label: Phonographic (Phono 02); Format: 2xCD, LP, BitTorrent, DD	—	—	
"—" denotes a recording that did not chart or was not released in that territory.

=== Compilation albums ===
- Dead Sea Scrolls (2009) Phonographic

=== Extended plays ===
Title	Details
Harvey Danger	Released: September 12, 2000; Label: London-Sire (Circuit City exclusive); Format: CD
Sometimes You Have to Work on Christmas (Sometimes)	Released: December 2004; Label: Phonographic; Format: CD

=== Singles ===
List of singles, with selected chart positions and certifications, showing year released and album name
Title	Year	Peak chart positions										Album
Title	Year	US Air.	US Alt.	US Pop	US Rock	AUS	CAN	FRA	ICE	SCO	UK	Album
"Flagpole Sitta"	1997	38	3	32	30	50	9	98	14	63	57	Where Have All the Merrymakers Gone?
"Private Helicopter"	1998	—	—	—	—	—	—	—	—	—	—	Where Have All the Merrymakers Gone?
"Save It for Later"	1999	—	29	—	—	—	—	—	—	—	—	200 Cigarettes soundtrack
"Sad Sweetheart of the Rodeo"	2000	—	27	—	—	—	—	—	—	—	—	King James Version
"Authenticity"	2001	—	—	—	—	—	—	—	—	—	—	King James Version
"Cream and Bastards Rise"	2005	—	—	—	—	—	—	—	—	—	—	Little by Little...
"Little Round Mirrors"	2006	—	—	—	—	—	—	—	—	—	—	Little by Little...
"The Show Must Not Go On"	2009	—	—	—	—	—	—	—	—	—	—	Non-album single
"—" denotes releases that did not chart or were not released in that territory.

=== Compilations and soundtracks ===
- Fuel: A Compilation (1997) Arena Rock Recording Company – "Carjack Fever"
- Now That's What I Call Music! (1998) PolyGram/Universal – "Flagpole Sitta"
- 200 Cigarettes Music from the Motion Picture (1999) PolyGram – "Save It for Later"
- Soul Survivors Original Motion Picture Soundtrack (2001) Gold Circle Records – "Authenticity"
- Otis' Opuses (2006) Kill Rock Stars – "Cream and Bastards Rise"

=== Music videos ===
Song	Year	Director	Album	Cite
"Flagpole Sitta"	1998	Liz Friedlander	Where Have All the Merrymakers Gone?	
"Private Helicopter"	1998	John Flansburgh	Where Have All the Merrymakers Gone?	
"Save It for Later"	1999	Evan Bernard	200 Cigarettes soundtrack	
"Sad Sweetheart of the Rodeo"	2000	Evan Bernard	King James Version	
"Sometimes You Have to Work on Christmas (Sometimes)"	2000	Sean Nelson	non-album single	
"Little Round Mirrors"	2006		Little by Little...	
