= Covered in the Flood =

Studio album by Chris Carrabba
- Released: November 17, 2011
- Recorded: 2011
- Genre: Emo, acoustic rock, alternative rock
- Length: 34:44

Professional ratings
Review scores
Source	Rating
PopMatters	4/10

Covered in the Flood is a full-length studio album of cover songs by American musician Chris Carrabba, released on November 17, 2011. It was available exclusively during his solo US tour in 2011.

Best known as the singer-songwriter for emo band Dashboard Confessional, it is the first official release for Carrabba as a solo artist.

== Background and recording ==
In an interview with PropertyOfZack at SXSW in 2013, Carrabba described the artists on the LP as "my influences and I don’t think there’s anything wrong with embracing them." He stated that he didn't want the album "to be pure imitation."

== Track listing ==
No.	Title	Original artist	Length
1.	"I'm in Love with a Girl"	Big Star	2:46
2.	"The Cape"	Guy Clark	3:18
3.	"Mama's Eyes"	Justin Townes Earle	2:21
4.	"Web in Front"	Archers of Loaf	2:22
5.	"The Commander Thinks Aloud"	The Long Winters	4:52
6.	"Tall Green Grass"	Cory Branan	3:32
7.	"We Used to Be Friends"	Dandy Warhols	3:25
8.	"Skyway"	The Replacements	2:08
9.	"Long Monday"	John Prine	3:24
10.	"It's the End of the World as We Know It (And I Feel Fine)"	R.E.M.	6:36
Total length:			34:44
