= The Worst You Can Do Is Harm =

Studio album by The Long Winters
- Released: February 19, 2002
- Recorded: 2001, 2002
- Genre: Alternative rock
- Length: 43:49
- Label: Barsuk Records
- Producer: Chris Walla, Sean Nelson, John Roderick

The Long Winters chronology
| The Worst You Can Do Is Harm (2002) | When I Pretend to Fall (2003) |

Professional ratings
Review scores
| Source | Rating |
|---|---|
| AllMusic | 2.5/5 stars |
| Pitchfork Media | (7.3/10) |

The Worst You Can Do Is Harm is the debut album by indie rock band The Long Winters. It was released by Barsuk Records in 2002. The album's title comes from a line in Track 8, "Scent of Lime."

== Track listing ==
1. "Give Me a Moment" – 5:49
2. "Carparts" – 4:05
3. "Samaritan" – 2:44
4. "Mimi" – 5:06
5. "Medicine Cabinet Pirate" – 5:04
6. "Unsalted Butter" – 4:47
7. "Government Loans" – 4:09
8. "Scent of Lime" – 4:04
9. "Copernicus" – 5:25
10. "Shanty Town" – 2:36
