= Flagpole Sitta =

1998 single by Harvey Danger

Single by Harvey Danger

from the album Where Have All the Merrymakers Gone?
- B-side: "The Ballad of the Tragic Hero (Pity and Fear)"; "Wrecking Ball"
- Released: April 27, 1998
- Recorded: June 1996
- Studio: John and Stu's Place (Seattle, Washington)
- Genre: Power pop; post-grunge; pop punk; alternative rock
- Length: 3:37
- Label: Slash; London
- Songwriters: Sean Nelson; Jeff J. Lin; Aaron Huffman; Evan Sult
- Producers: John Goodmanson; Harvey Danger

Harvey Danger singles chronology
"Flagpole Sitta" (1998)	"Private Helicopter" (1998)

"Flagpole Sitta" is a song by American rock band Harvey Danger from their 1997 debut album, Where Have All the Merrymakers Gone? It was released as the band's debut single in April 1998 and was met with critical and commercial success, peaking at number 38 on the US Billboard Hot 100 Airplay chart, number three on the Billboard Modern Rock Tracks chart, and number nine on the Canadian RPM Alternative 30. A music video was produced to promote the single.

== Composition ==
"Flagpole Sitta" was recorded in June 1996 at John and Stu's Place in Seattle, Washington, during the Where Have All the Merrymakers Gone? recording sessions. According to drummer Evan Sult, the song was written as a response to the Seattle music scene of the 1990s and its effect on mainstream culture.

The title of the song was inspired by the 1930 Marx Brothers film Animal Crackers, which features a line of dialogue about the pole sitting fad of the 1920s. The band was inspired to spell "sitter" as "sitta" by the Pavement song "Fame Throwa" and the N.W.A album Straight Outta Compton.

== Release and reception ==
"Flagpole Sitta" gained popularity after Seattle radio station KNDD put the song into rotation. Afterwards, London Records sent a copy of Where Have All the Merrymakers Gone? to KROQ-FM in Los Angeles, who began to air "Flagpole Sitta" and received a positive response from listeners. On April 27, 1998, the song was officially serviced to US rock radio, and a release to contemporary hit radio followed on June 9 of the same year. The song gained further exposure when it was used as the music in theatrical trailers and TV spots for the 1998 film Disturbing Behavior. The track subsequently charted at number 38 on the Billboard Hot 100 Airplay chart.

"Flagpole Sitta" is regarded as a power pop single by MTV and a post-grunge anthem by author Ericka Chickowski. PopMatters describes the single as "a hyper-literate alternative rock dissection of the stupidity of the modern age". Music journalist Rob Sheffield also considers the song as "nineties pop-punk rage at its loudest". Rolling Stone ranked the track as the 25th-best song of the 1990s and the best song of 1998.

== Track listings ==
7-inch single
No.	Title	Length
1.	"Flagpole Sitta"	3:37
2.	"The Ballad of the Tragic Hero (Pity and Fear)"	4:30

European and Australasian CD single
No.	Title	Length
1.	"Flagpole Sitta"	3:37
2.	"Wrecking Ball"	4:39
3.	"The Ballad of the Tragic Hero (Pity and Fear)"	4:30

== Charts ==
=== Weekly chart ===
Chart (1998)	Peak position
Australia (ARIA)	50
Canada Rock/Alternative (RPM)	9
France (SNEP)	98
Iceland (Íslenski Listinn Topp 40)	14
Scottish Singles Sales (Official Charts)	63
UK Singles (Official Charts)	57
US Radio Songs (Billboard)	38
US Adult Pop Airplay (Billboard)	31
US Alternative Airplay (Billboard)	3
US Mainstream Rock (Billboard)	33
US Pop Airplay (Billboard)	32

=== Year-end chart ===
Chart (1998)	Position
US Adult Top 40 (Billboard)	88
US Modern Rock Tracks (Billboard)	7

== Release history ==
Region	Date	Format(s)	Label(s)	Ref.
United States	April 27, 1998	Rock radio	Slash; London	
United States	June 9, 1998	Contemporary hit radio	Slash; London	
United Kingdom	July 20, 1998	7-inch vinyl; CD; cassette	Slash; London	

== In popular culture ==
"Flagpole Sitta" was used as the theme song for the British sitcom Peep Show for the second series through the ninth. In 2008, Harvey Danger singer Sean Nelson stated that Peep Show is "...the only pop culture item the song has been associated with that feels like a kindred spirit to the original attitude of the lyric." In 2016, he said: "It's a joy to be affiliated with something that's so smart and so funny and so kind of rude and weird." It was also included on the soundtrack to Scooby-Doo 2: Monsters Unleashed and was featured in a 2024 Taco Bell television commercial advertising the $7 Luxe Cravings Box's inclusion of 1990s menu item the Gordita Supreme. "Weird Al" Yankovic included the song in his "Polka Power!" medley on the 1999 album Running with Scissors. Flagpole Sitta has been featured in several films including American Pie and Dickie Roberts: Former Child Star.
