= Boat (band) =

American indie rock band

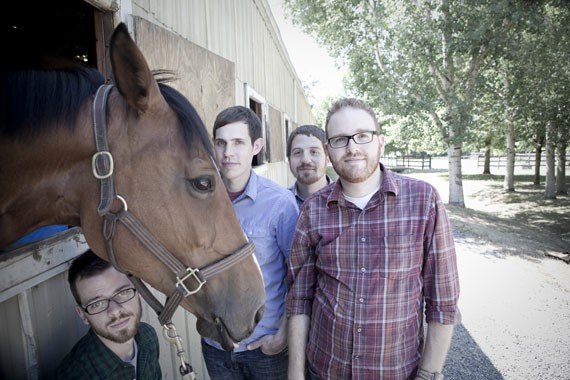
M. McKenzie, J. Long, D. Crane, J. Goodman (Photo by J. Hollingsworth)

Boat, usually stylized as BOAT, is an American indie rock band from Seattle, Washington. Their album Dress Like Your Idols was released in 2011 on Magic Marker Records and has received favorable reviews and notable press from major media outlets including Pitchfork Media, and AllMusic.

The band's sound has been compared to Built to Spill, The New Pornographers, and Superchunk. BOAT's sixth studio album, Tread Lightly, was released on May 1, 2020 by Magic Marker Records.

On March 19, 2020, D. Crane of BOAT began performing nightly on Instagram Live in response to the "Stay Home, Stay Health" order in Washington State. BOAT Song of the Night continued each weekday night through June 1, a run of 53 shows. The show features music from members of BOAT, fellow musicians such as Chris Ballew and Bob Nastanovich, author Lindy West and DJ Marco Collins. BSOTN resumed July 17, 2020 and continues sporadically.

On August 7, 2020, BOAT released the first singles from their quarantine collection, "Quartanteen Dreem." The band released singles on each Bandcamp Friday that followed throughout 2020 with proceeds going to charities chosen by guest artists and collaborators.

== Discography ==
=== Studio albums ===
- Life Is A Shipwreck, We Must Remember To Sing In The Lifeboats (2004)
- After All (2004)
- Songs That You Might Not Like (2006)
- Let's Drag Our Feet (2007)
- Setting the Paces (2009)
- Dress Like Your Idols (2011)
- Pretend To Be Brave (2013)
- 50 Sweaty BOAT Fans Can't Be Wrong (Early Recordings Compilation) (2014)
- Tread Lightly (2020)
- No Plans To Stick The Landing (2022)

=== EPs ===
- Topps 7" (2008)
- (I'll Beat My Chest Like) King Kong" (2011)

=== Singles ===
- In a Pickle b/w May the Best Days Lie Ahead (2020)
- Warm Up the Choppers b/w Dog Days (2020)
- We Don't Need Enemies b/w Bundle the Ones (2020)
- Fight The Clouds b/w There an Island (2020)
- Drive to Oregon b/w Heartache Honey (2020)
- My Haunted Friend b/w That's Not a Mountain, This is a Mountain (2021)

== Personnel ==
=== Present ===
- D. Crane, vocals and guitar
- M. McKenzie, bass and guitar
- J. Goodman, drums, guitar, keys
- J. Long, drums.
- J. Askew, keys

=== Past or touring members ===
- Z. Duffy, guitar, keys (touring member)
- I. Bone, guitar (touring member)
- P. Mayben, drums
- J. Fell, drums (touring member)
- R. Cancro, guitar, saxophone, keys (touring member)
- B. Stewart, guitar, keys (touring member)
- J. Angle, drums
