= John Roderick (musician) =

American musician and writer

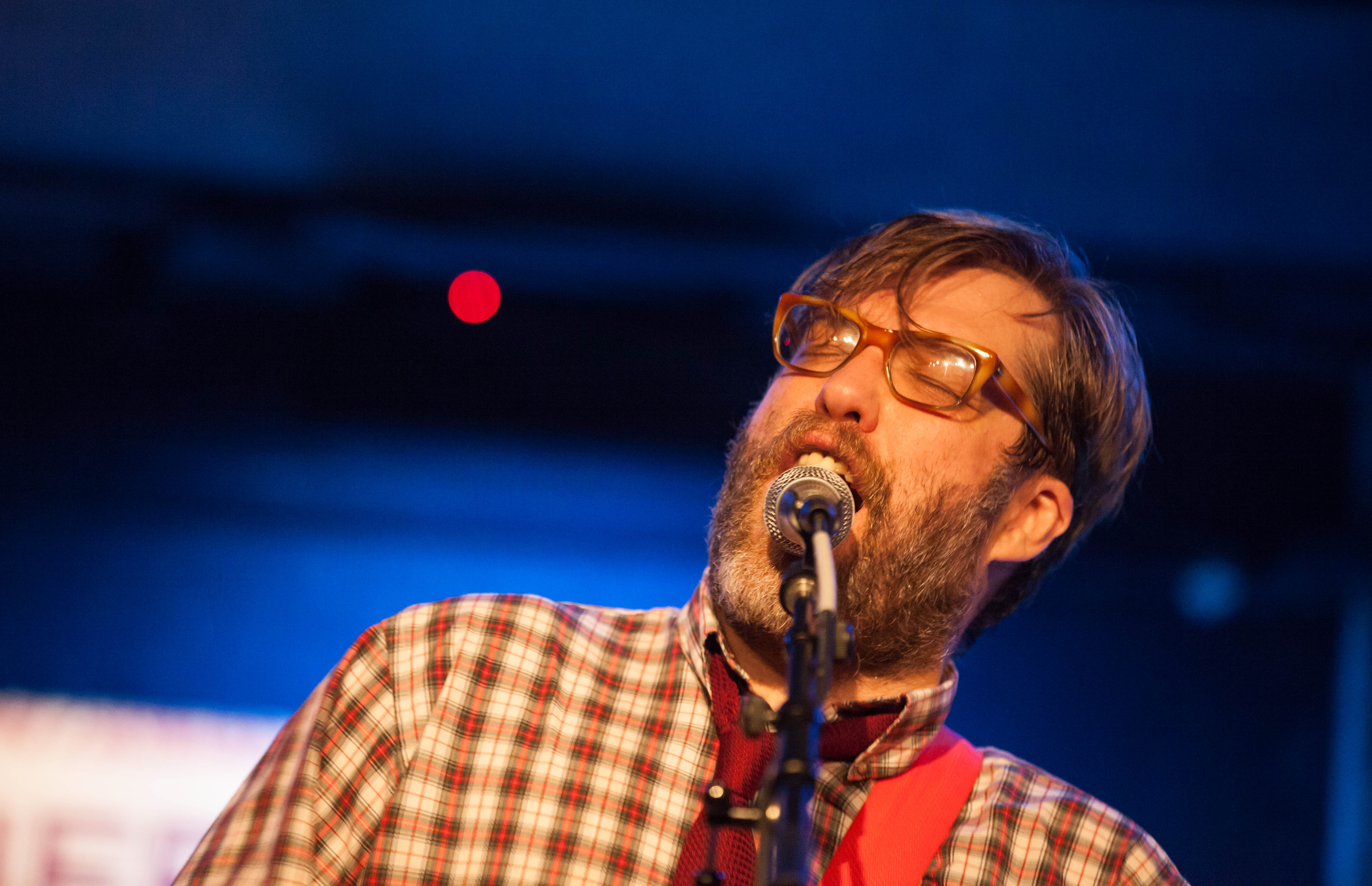
- Roderick performing in December 2012
- Born: September 13, 1968 (age 57); Seattle, Washington, U.S.
- Occupations: Musician; singer; songwriter; podcaster; politician
- Years active: 1997–present
- Children: 1
- Parent: David Roderick (father)
- Relatives: Jack Roderick (uncle); Libby Roderick (cousin)
- Musical career
- Genres: Indie rock; alternative rock
- Instruments: Vocals; guitar; bass; keyboards
- Label: Barsuk Records
- Member of: The Long Winters
- Formerly of: Western State Hurricanes; Harvey Danger
- Website: www.johnroderick.com

John Morgan Roderick (born September 13, 1968) is an American musician, singer, songwriter, podcaster, and politician. He is the lead singer and guitarist of the rock band The Long Winters, was a touring member of the rock band Harvey Danger, and co-hosts the podcasts Roderick On The Line and Omnibus.

== Early life ==
Roderick was born in Seattle on September 13, 1968, the son of Marcia and David Roderick. His father was a Washington State legislator and World War II veteran. His mother was a computer programmer who eventually rose to an executive position working for the Trans-Alaska Pipeline System. Roderick has three older half-siblings from his father, and a sister, Susan.

In 1971, the family moved to Anchorage, Alaska. In 1973, Roderick's parents divorced and his mother took John and Susan back to Washington state, but returned to Anchorage shortly after. He graduated from East Anchorage High and moved back to Seattle. Roderick enrolled at Gonzaga University in 1987, but left after two years. In 2019, Roderick graduated with a BA from the University of Washington after three decades of undergraduate study.

== Career ==
=== Western State Hurricanes (1997–1999) ===
Roderick's first major band was The Western State Hurricanes, which he started while attending the University of Washington. The band enjoyed quick success, playing their first show at Seattle venue "The Breakroom" in May 1998. The band split after failing to sign a deal with Sub Pop Records. Having recorded an unreleased album in the late 1990s, Roderick was prompted by Pete Greenberg to remaster their debut album, Through With Love, which was announced in late 2019 by Latent Print Records. In February 2020, the band regrouped to perform shows, including a recorded performance on KEXP.

=== Harvey Danger (1999–2001) ===
After the disbanding of The Western State Hurricanes, Roderick was offered a spot to play keyboard in popular Seattle band Harvey Danger. Roderick played with the band until they went on hiatus in April 2001.

=== The Long Winters (2001–present) ===
Along with former Harvey Danger singer/songwriter Sean Nelson, Roderick founded the indie rock band The Long Winters in the wake of Harvey Danger's breakup. Roderick penned the band's first album, The Worst You Can Do Is Harm, in 2001 and released the album on Barsuk Records. The band since released two more albums, When I Pretend to Fall (2003) and Putting the Days to Bed (2006), and one EP titled Ultimatum (2005). The band still plays shows, playing at the inaugural Upstream Festival in 2017.

== Podcasts ==
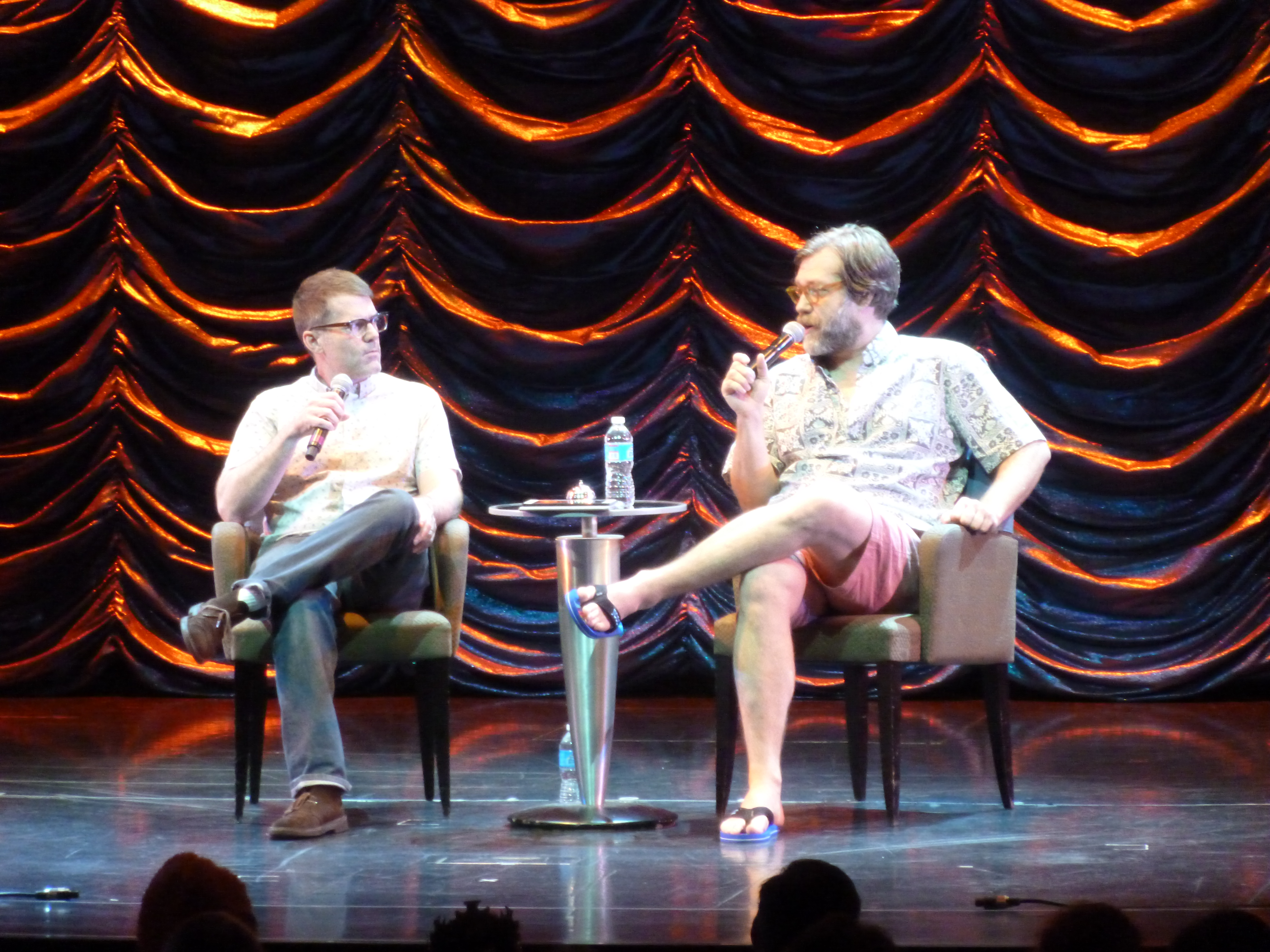
Merlin Mann and Roderick

In September 2011, Roderick began co-hosting the Roderick on the Line podcast with Merlin Mann. On August 13, 2015, he released the first episode of his second podcast, called Road Work, with co-host Dan Benjamin. Both podcasts are loose-form and conversation based, with new episodes released at irregular intervals.

On September 7, 2017, HowStuffWorks announced a new show entitled Omnibus, co-hosted by Roderick and Jeopardy! host Ken Jennings. Alternating as host each episode, they discuss topics they "fear might be lost to history", typically niche cultural trends and historical events. The first episode was posted on December 7, 2017. On August 9, 2019, they announced their separation from iHeartRadio, and shifted to a Patreon-funded model. On January 1, 2023, the podcast decreased from twice weekly to once a week, citing the time required for Jennings' work as Jeopardy! host. On September 30, 2025, it was announced that Jennings would be leaving the podcast as a regular co-host, due to his commitments to Jeopardy!, remaining on as an executive producer and occasional guest host.

Roderick, along with Adam Pranica and Benjamin Ahr Harrison, presented Friendly Fire, a weekly podcast about war films that ran from January 12, 2018, to January 22, 2021.

== Musical collaborations ==
Roderick frequently collaborates with other musicians. Along with collaborator Sean Nelson, he provided vocals on Death Cab for Cutie's album Transatlanticism. He also collaborated with Jonathan Coulton for Coulton's album Artificial Heart, released in September 2011, as well as the duo's Christmas album One Christmas at a Time. Roderick co-wrote the song "Poor Judge" on Aimee Mann's 2017 album Mental Illness, which was later adapted as a dance-theatre cabaret set to the music of Mann. Roderick co-wrote "Soft Place to Land" for Kathleen Edwards's Voyageur album; the song won the 2012 SOCAN Echo Songwriting Prize.

== Political career ==
Roderick became a founding member of the Seattle Music Commission in 2010, appointed to the position by former Seattle Mayor Mike McGinn.

In 2015, encouraged by McGinn, Roderick announced his candidacy for Seattle City Council Position 8, one of two city council positions that represent the entire city. He came in third place in the citywide primary, winning 15.90% of the vote.

== Personal life ==
Roderick currently lives in Seattle with his daughter. In 2017, he was honored with the position of King Neptune for the 2017 Seattle Seafair.

== "Bean Dad" controversy ==
In January 2021, Roderick posted a Twitter thread in which he discussed preventing his nine-year-old daughter from eating a can of baked beans until she could open it using a manual can opener by herself, which he estimated took six hours. His comments were met with a large outcry on Twitter, and some users began derisively referring to Roderick as "Bean Dad".

The podcast My Brother, My Brother and Me, which had previously used The Long Winters' song "It's a Departure" as a theme, announced that they would be removing the music from the show; it was replaced by "My Life Is Better with You" by Montaigne. Friendly Fire, which was co-hosted by Roderick, went on a brief hiatus before announcing on January 22 that it would not be returning.

Roderick posted an extensive apology to his website addressing the controversy. He stated that the story was "poorly told" and not properly contextualized. He added that he and his daughter had already eaten a large breakfast, were smiling and laughing throughout the ordeal, and that she had had access to other snacks. He also apologized for the language of his story, saying he was not aware how it affected abuse survivors. He additionally addressed what he described as his "racist, anti-Semitic, hurtful, and slur-filled tweets" from 2011 that had resurfaced at the same time as "intended to be ironic [and] sarcastic" but still "wrong". In 2023, Roderick said he subsequently learned the resurfaced tweets were initially compiled during his 2015 campaign for Seattle City Council by an opponent.

Roderick later stated he received a visit from Child Protective Services to verify the welfare of his daughter because of the controversy, and that they had found nothing of concern. In late 2023, Roderick detailed his experiences during and after the Bean Dad controversy on the Labyrinths podcast hosted by Amanda Knox.
