= The Long Winters =

American indie rock band

- Origin: Seattle, Washington, U.S.
- Genre: Indie rock
- Years active: 2001–present
- Label: Barsuk
- Members: John Roderick
- Past members: Sean Nelson; Chris Walla; Michael Shilling; Michael Schorr; Chris Caniglia; Darren Loucas; Mike Squires; Nabil Ayers; Jonathan Rothman; Eric Corson; Robbie Lodermeier

The Long Winters is an American indie rock band based in Seattle, Washington.

== History ==
Singer-songwriter John Roderick was born in Seattle, Washington, and grew up in Anchorage, Alaska. He later returned to Seattle, where he formed the Bun Family Players and The Western State Hurricanes. Following the disbandment of the latter, he became the touring keyboardist for Harvey Danger.

In 2001, Harvey Danger singer-songwriter Sean Nelson suggested that he and Roderick record an album—half of the songs penned by Roderick, and the other half by Nelson. Death Cab for Cutie band member Chris Walla had recently opened up the Hall of Justice studio in Seattle and agreed to help them record.

Roderick recruited Joe Bass of Sky Cries Mary and Brian Young of Fountains of Wayne to flesh out several of the songs, and gradually the album evolved to feature only Roderick's songs. After several months, The Worst You Can Do Is Harm was finished.

Roderick traveled to New York, where he played solo shows and began to pen new songs. Several of these songs would eventually be included on The Long Winters' second album, When I Pretend to Fall.

While there, he was contacted by Barsuk Records—the label that would release The Worst You Can Do Is Harm—who made it clear they wanted Roderick to tour to promote the release. He traveled back to Seattle and was joined by Chris Caniglia, former Western State Hurricanes drummer Michael Shilling and Eric Corson on bass. Thus, The Long Winters was born.

=== Official formation ===
Nelson offered to sing harmony vocals on a number of songs at the band's first live performance. He ended up casually performing with the band for their first few shows before joining the band.

The original trio responsible for The Worst You Can Do Is Harm—Roderick, Nelson, and Walla—is often considered the original incarnation of the band. Roderick and Nelson, along with recruits Corson and Shilling (the drummer in Roderick's previous band, the Western State Hurricanes) are the core players behind When I Pretend to Fall, with Nelson having replaced Caniglia as the band's keyboardist. When I Pretend to Fall was released and Roderick, Nelson, Corson and Shilling embarked on tours throughout 2003 in support of the album. The band toured North America with Barsuk Records labelmates Nada Surf and Death Cab for Cutie, and later spent November touring Europe. Shilling quit in December 2003. Nelson left in March 2004 to rekindle his former band Harvey Danger.

=== 2004–present ===
At the time of Nelson's departure, The Long Winters had begun rehearsing with Shilling's replacement, former Death Cab for Cutie percussionist Michael Schorr. An east coast tour with The Pernice Brothers, a European tour, and a nationwide tour supporting The Decemberists would take the band through the spring and well into the summer. Thus, the leaner three-piece version of The Long Winters was born, featuring Roderick, Corson, and Schorr.

The spring/summer 2004 tour took its toll on Schorr, who left the band shortly after its completion. Roderick continued to do small promotional events and shows throughout the latter half of 2004 and 2005, often previewing a handful of new Long Winters songs.

The next incarnation of The Long Winters featured Roderick on vocals, guitars, and keyboard, Corson on bass and back-up vocals, and Nabil Ayers (co-founder of Seattle's Sonic Boom Records) on drums. The band did a tour supporting Keane in October 2005 in support of an EP released October 11, 2005, titled Ultimatum. Roderick did a solo tour through Europe in May 2006 to promote the third full-length LP, Putting the Days to Bed, which was released July 25, 2006. In the fall of 2006 the band—now with guitarist/keyboard player Jonathan Rothman replacing Mike Squires—toured the US, after which they joined Keane once again for a European tour. The Long Winters began 2007 with yet another European tour, followed by a month of shows in the United States and Canada.

In July 2008 the band went back into the studio to work on a fourth album. In mid-2009 through early-2010, a satiric "quasi-weekly" 9 episode series by Roderick entitled "13 Songs with John" was made available through YouTube ostensibly focusing on the work Roderick was doing in the studio. None of the episodes actually featured Roderick working in the studio. Through 2011, Roderick, through The Long Winters website, continued to promise the long-awaited new album would be released "soon."

The Long Winters released a split single with Spiral Stairs in September 2010. Their track was titled "Connections In Nashville.”

The Long Winters was featured in a January 2015 episode of Song Exploder, profiling their song "The Commander Thinks Aloud."

In August 2016, Roderick indicated in a conversation with Dan Benjamin on his podcast "Road Work" that he has begun working on the fourth album, reworking songs that had been recorded in the sessions dating back to 2007.

The song "It's a Departure" from Putting The Days To Bed was used as the theme song for the podcast My Brother, My Brother, and Me. The podcast announced on January 3, 2021, that after a controversy involving Roderick on Twitter they would no longer be using the song.

== TV appearances ==
- Beautiful Noise

== Discography ==
Studio albums

- The Worst You Can Do Is Harm (2002)
- When I Pretend to Fall (2003)
- Putting the Days to Bed (2006)

EPs

- Ultimatum (2005)
