= Alcohol in France =

Alcohol is of enormous importance in French culture. It is produced almost everywhere in the country, and has become a part of French gastronomy. Nowadays, French alcohol is well known in the whole world, and every region has its speciality. As of 2026, wine is the most preferred alcoholic beverage in France.

== History ==
In 2016, France ranked 12th in the world for average alcohol consumption per capita.

Some historians link high alcohol consumption to the Middle Ages. At that time, alcoholic drinks formed a large part of the average worker's diet. It was drunk from the morning, up to 3 litres per person per day. Some scholars argue that alcohol played a role in the French Revolution, acting as "a catalyst and a lubricant" for the events of July 1789.

== Health risks ==
7% of the deaths in France of people aged 15 years and over are attributable to alcohol. It kills 41,000 people each year. Around 580,000 hospitalizations due to alcohol take place in France each year. The estimated cost of these hospitalizations is 2.64 billion euros. In 2022, 22% of adults had alcohol consumption above recommendations. Risks of alcoholism are higher for men (33.5%) than for women (14.9%).

Alcohol can cause diseases directly, such as cirrhosis, or become a risk factor for other diseases, such as cancer, cardiovascular disease, or cognitive and psychological disorders like anxiety, depression and behavioral disorders, which may be irreversible. To explain with figures: 30,000 men and 11,000 women died because of alcohol in 2015: 16,000 deaths from cancer, 9,900 from cardiovascular diseases, 6,800 from digestive diseases, 3,000 from other diseases ( diabetes, mental illness, epilepsy, etc.) and 5,400 by accident or suicide. This represents 11% of male mortality and 4% of female mortality, with an overall average of 7%. 90% of these deaths are linked to consumption of more than 5 glasses per day. 10% of drinkers are responsible for 58% of alcohol consumption.

Due to all the consequences, social cost of alcohol is estimated at 120 billion euros per year. Public finances represent 5% of this cost.

In France, alcohol consumption during pregnancy is considered as the leading cause of mental disability of non-genetic origin in children

To help people in difficulties, associations of former drinkers (Alcool Assistance, Alcoholics Anonymous, Blue Cross, Vie Libre, etc.) participate in the treatment of alcoholic illness and enable patients to recover sustainably.

== Marketing ==
Advertising alcohol on TV or cinema is illegal in France. However, online advertising is not restricted. Alcohol advertisers may use humor, seduction, or feelings of empowerment to promote their products.

== By region ==
=== Auvergne-Rhône-Alpes ===
Located in the eastern part of France, Auvergne-Rhône-Alpes is another significant alcohol production hub. Its mountain range allows for the production of unique beverages, especially Génépi and Chartreuse. Also available are:

- Côtes du Rhône
- Beaujolais
- Vins de Savoie
- Artisanal beer
- Marc de Savoie
- Cidre de Savoie
- Vermouth

=== Bourgogne-Franche-Comté ===
Bourgogne-Franche-Comté is perhaps the most renowned wine region in France. It produces globally known wines like Romanée-Conti, the most expensive wine in the world, as well as Anis de Pontarlier, Marc de Bourgogne, and Fine de Bourgogne.

=== Brittany ===
Brittany is one of the regions that consumes the most alcohol in France. Its specialities are cider, chouchen, beer, and lambig.

=== Centre-Val de Loire ===
A dominant wine region in France, Centre-Val de Loire is the origin of 3 notable wines: Vins de la Loire, Vouvray, and Sauvignon de Touraine.

=== Corsica ===
Examples of alcohol produced in Corsica include:

- Vin Corse
- Muscat du Cap Corse
- Pietra
- Myrte
- Cap Corse Mattei
- Acquavita

=== Grand Est ===
The Grand Est region has many different types of alcoholic drinks:

- Crément d'Alsace
- Champagne
- Mirabelle
- Kirsch
- Beer
- Vin d'Alsace

=== Hauts-de-France ===
Located on the north of France, this region mostly produces beers instead of wines. Hauts-de-France also produces Picon, which is often drunk with beer.

=== Île-de-France ===
Île-de-France is the most urbanised region in France, making it unsuitable for vineyards. As the main and most populous region in France, however, it has an essential role of point of distribution and consumption across the country.

=== Nouvelle-Aquitaine ===
Located in southwest France, Nouvelle-Aquitaine produces a great variety of alcoholic drinks, including the very famous Vin de Bordeaux, a red wine. Others include:

- Cognac
- Pineau des Charentes
- Vins de Bergerac
- Floc de Gascogne
- Armagnac
- Liqueur d'Angélique

=== Normandy ===
Many alcoholic drinks produced in Normandy are apple-based, like cider, Calvados (apple brandy), Pommeau, Poiré, and Bénédictine.

=== Occitania ===
Adjacent to Nouvelle-Aquitaine, Occitania also has many local alcoholic drinks. The most popular are Vins de Languedoc-Roussillon, which are a mix of white, red and rose wine. Others include:

- Arrmagnac
- Marc du Languedoc
- Blanquette de Limoux
- Clairette
- Cartagène

=== Pays de La Loire ===
This region has a celebrated drink, Cointreau, produced in downtown Angers. Other types of alcohol are Muscadet, Vins d'Anjou, and Saumur.

=== Provence-Alpes-Côte d'Azur ===
Situated in southeastern France, Provence-Alpes-Côte d'Azur is well known for its rosé wines, but mostly for its anise-derived beverages, such as pastis and Ricard.

== See also ==
- Alcohol law
- Dry January
