= Ripple (wine) =

Fortified wine brand

- Type: Flavored fortified wine
- Manufacturer: E. & J. Gallo Winery
- Distributor: E. & J. Gallo Winery
- Origin: United States
- Introduced: 1959
- Alcohol by volume: 8
- Proof (US): 16

Ripple is a discontinued discount, lightly carbonated, flavored fortified wine produced by E & J Gallo Winery. Ernest Gallo, during a period of expanding his winemaking business into new markets, introduced the brand when a 1959 change to wine regulations allowed mild carbonation in table wine. Ripple was widely popular during the 1970s due to its sweet flavor. Ripple was described as a low-priced, lightly carbonated wine positioned within the emerging U.S. "pop wine" market with marketing aimed at younger consumers.

Ripple was made from the cheapest grapes available, Thompson Seedless, and was described as a "groundbreaking beverage", as it contained half the carbonation of Coca-Cola and double the alcohol of beer, and the low price made it attractive to college students and other underaged drinkers. Within the drinks industry, Ripple has been described as an early precursor to later flavored alcoholic beverages, including wine coolers and flavored malt drinks. Some commentary has characterized it as a "wine cooler before the term existed". Although the product has been discontinued, unopened bottles have acquired collector value.

== History ==
Ripple emerged in the late 1950s as part of E. & J. Gallo’s efforts to broaden wine consumption beyond traditional dining contexts. Early varieties included "Red", followed by flavored variants such as "Pear" and "Pagan Pink". Advertising emphasized youth and novelty, with campaigns describing it as "a new drink for lively people" and "the wine that winks back at you". The brand discontinued Ripple in 1984. Retrospective accounts describe its production span as approximately 1960 to 1984.

== Cultural references ==
Ripple became a recurring pop-cultural marker of inexpensive, sweet fortified wine in the US. Its best-known television association was referred to on the TV series Sanford & Son, in which the character Fred Sanford frequently identified Ripple as his preferred alcoholic beverage of choice.

By the early 1970s, it was discussed as part of a youth-oriented "pop wine" market, and later memoir-based writing continued to invoke it as a marker of casual urban countercultural drinking. It has also been referenced in music, with appearances on the Grateful Dead’s Vintage Dead album cover and in songs by Hoyt Axton, Gordon Lightfoot, Motörhead, and Eazy-E.

Other cultural references include:

- Mentioned in Chapter 30 of the horror novel Summer of Night, by Dan Simmons, where it is described by one character as “moose piss.”
- Mentioned in the 1984 film Top Secret!
- Mentioned in the 1994 film Forrest Gump.
- Mentioned on the TV series Supernatural, season 3, episode 8
- Mentioned in the film The Wood.
- Jodie Foster's character asks Alfred Lutter's character if he "want[s] to get high on Ripple" in Martin Scorsese's 1974 film Alice Doesn't Live Here Anymore.
- Mentioned in the Richard Pryor film Which Way Is Up?.
- Jordy Virrill in the Stephen King anthology film Creepshow drinks it.

== See also ==
- Fortified wine
- Thunderbird (wine)
