= MD 20/20 =

Fortified wine brand

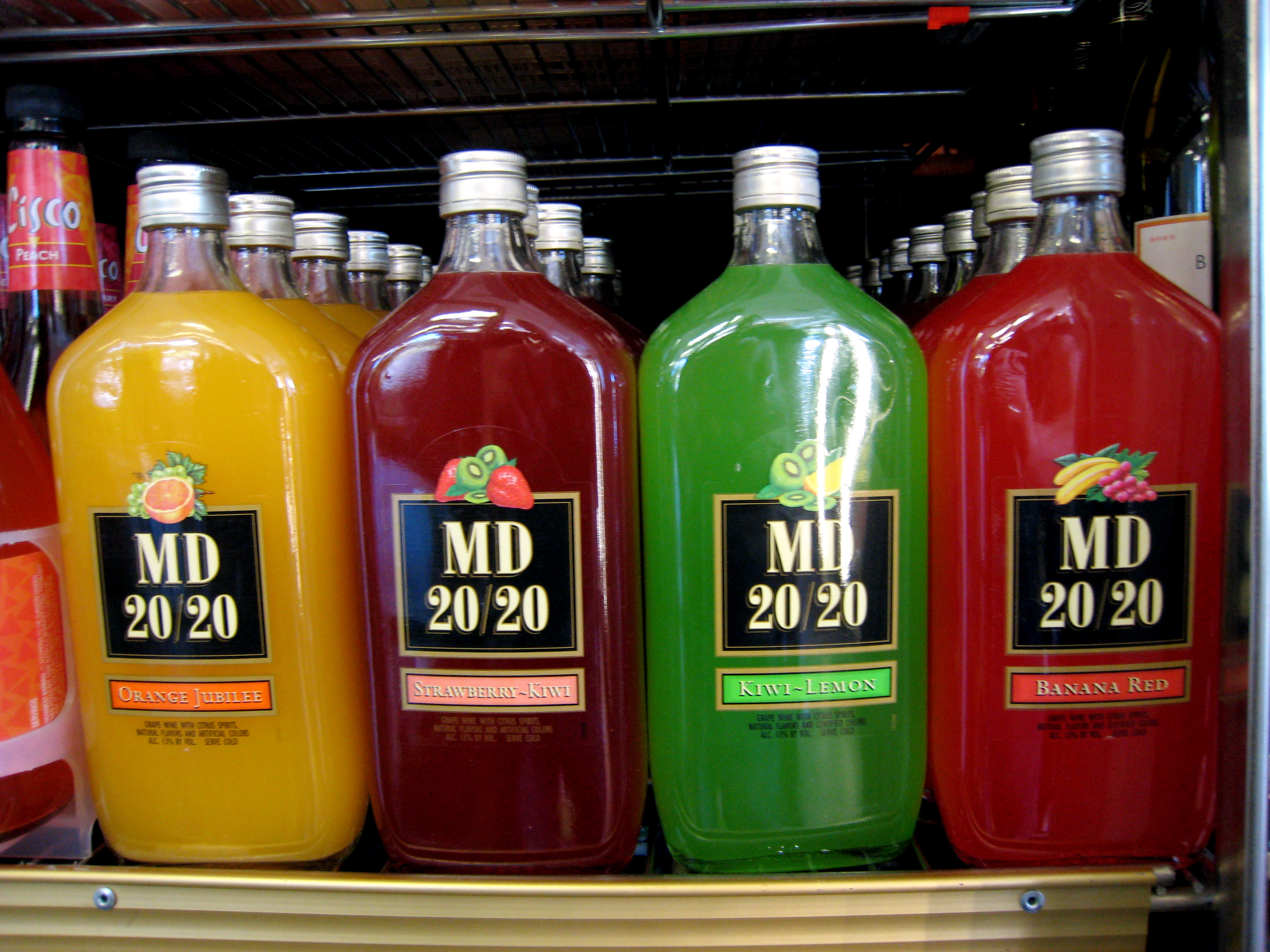
- Type: Flavored fortified wine
- Manufacturer: Mogen David
- Distributor: Mogen David
- Origin: United States
- Alcohol by volume: 13–18%
- Proof (US): 26-36

MD 20/20 is a discount flavored fortified wine produced by Mogen David. 20/20 originally referred to 20% ABV and a 20 oz bottle. It is commonly referred to by the nickname "Mad Dog".

The wine is produced in a variety of flavors, sold in 750ml bottles, and alcohol content varies by flavor from 13% ABV to 18% ABV. Like competitors Thunderbird and Night Train Express, its sweet flavors, strength, and low cost are often associated with alcoholism among the homeless and destitute but also make it popular with college students and other underage drinkers.

Despite being made in the US, MD 20/20 enjoys a cult following in Scotland. In 2019, after a new flavor "Electric Melon" became available, patrons lined up around the block at shops to purchase the beverage; in some cases, the crowds were so large they blocked traffic.

== History ==
Mogen David originated to serve a niche market by supplying wine to observant Jews for religious holidays but needed to expand their market to remain in business. The date MD 20/20 entered production is obscure; however, by the 1970s, it accounted for over 50% of Mogen David's sales.

== See also ==
- Fortified wine
