= Nightrain =

1989 single by Guns N' Roses

Single by Guns N' Roses

from the album Appetite for Destruction
- B-side: "Reckless Life"
- Released: July 1989
- Genre: Hard rock; heavy metal
- Length: 4:26
- Label: Geffen
- Songwriters: Axl Rose; Duff McKagan; Izzy Stradlin; Slash
- Producer: Mike Clink

Guns N' Roses singles chronology
"Patience" (1989)	"Nightrain" (1989)	"You Could Be Mine" (1991)

"Nightrain" (pronounced "Night Train") is a song by the American rock band Guns N' Roses. The song is a tribute to an infamous brand of cheap Californian fortified wine, Night Train Express, which was extremely popular with the band during their early days because of its low price and high alcohol content. The title is spelled differently, omitting a T and removing the space, making a portmanteau of the two words.

"Nightrain" is the third song on the band's debut studio album, Appetite for Destruction (1987), and was released as the album's fifth and final single, reaching number 93 on the US Billboard Hot 100 chart. The song was ranked eighth on Guitar World's list of the "Top 10 Drinking Songs". The track was not included on Guns N' Roses' 2004 Greatest Hits album.

== Composition ==
Slash describes "Nightrain" as "an anthem that we came up with on the spot". The original idea for the song came when Slash and Izzy Stradlin wrote the main riff while they were sitting on the floor of the band's practice room. The next day, Slash was ill so Stradlin finished writing the music with Duff McKagan. However, they did not write any lyrics. The song remained incomplete until one night when the band was walking down Palm Avenue in West Hollywood, California, sharing a bottle of Night Train. Someone yelled "I'm on the night train!" and the whole band joined in, with Axl Rose improvising the lines in between: "Bottoms up!" "Fill my cup!" etc. After this initial inspiration, the band finished the song within a day.

The first half of the first guitar solo and the lead intro is played by Izzy Stradlin, while all other lead guitar parts are played by Slash.

== Reception ==
"Nightrain" is widely regarded as one of the band's best songs. In 2017, Paste ranked the song number three on their list of the 15 greatest Guns N' Roses songs, and in 2020, Kerrang ranked the song number five on their list of the 20 greatest Guns N' Roses songs.

== Live ==
"Nightrain" is a staple at Guns N' Roses concerts. In earlier shows, it was usually played early in the set. During the Chinese Democracy Tour, it is usually played as the last song before the encore, or during the encore. In some shows in late 2006, Izzy Stradlin, former rhythm guitarist and co-founder of Guns N' Roses, joined the band for "Nightrain" and other songs.

Slash describes in his autobiography how "Nightrain" is his favorite song to perform live: "That song has a rhythm to it in the verses that from the start always made me go crazy. The first time we played it, even, I started jumping up and down – I couldn't help it. When we had our huge stage later on, I'd run the length of it, jump off the amplifiers, and lose it just about every single time we played it. I'm not sure why, but no other song we've ever played live made me move like that."

== Track listings ==
All tracks are written by Guns N' Roses except where noted.

UK 7-inch vinyl and CC (GEF 60; GEF 60C)
No.	Title	Writer(s)	Length
1.	"Nightrain" (LP version)
2.	"Reckless Life" (LP version)	Guns N' Roses, Chris Weber

UK 12" vinyl and 3" CD (GEF 60T; GEF 60CD)
No.	Title	Writer(s)	Length
1.	"Nightrain" (LP version)
2.	"Knocking on Heaven's Door" (live Bob Dylan cover)	Bob Dylan
3.	"Reckless Life" (LP version)	Guns N’ Roses, Weber

== Personnel ==
- W. Axl Rose – lead vocals
- Slash – lead guitar, rhythm guitar
- Izzy Stradlin – rhythm guitar, lead guitar (first guitar solo only), backing vocals
- Duff "Rose" McKagan – bass guitar, backing vocals
- Steven Adler – drums, cowbell

== Charts ==
Chart (1989)	Peak position
Australia (ARIA)	61
Belgium (Ultratop 50 Flanders)	39
Europe (Eurochart Hot 100)	43
Ireland (IRMA)	2
New Zealand (Recorded Music NZ)	21
UK Singles (Official Charts)	17
US Billboard Hot 100	93
US Mainstream Rock (Billboard)	26

== Certifications ==
Certifications for "Nightrain"
Region	Certification	Certified units/sales
New Zealand (RMNZ)	Gold	15,000^{‡}
United Kingdom (BPI)	Silver	200,000^{‡}
^{‡} Sales+streaming figures based on certification alone.

== Release history ==
Region	Date	Format(s)	Label(s)	Ref.
United States	July 1989	7-inch vinyl; cassette	Geffen	
United Kingdom	August 21, 1989	7-inch vinyl; 12-inch vinyl; CD; cassette	Geffen	
