= Calvados =

Calvados may refer to:

- Calvados (brandy)
- Calvados (department), a department in France
