= Mogen David =

American wine-producing company

Mogen David Wine Corporation
- Type: Private
- Industry: Winemaking
- Predecessor: Wine Corporation of America
- Founded: Chicago, United States (1933)
- Founder: Max Cohen; Henry Markus
- Headquarters: Westfield, New York, United States
- Key people: E. Schwartz, President
- Revenue: $75 to $149.99 million
- Number of employees: 100 to 250
- Parent: The Wine Group, LLC
- Website: mogendavid.com

Mogen David Wine Co. is a company based in Westfield, New York, that makes wines, including the fortified wine MD 20/20. Mogen David Wine Co. is a trademark held by their parent company The Wine Group in Livermore, California.

Mogen David is the Ashkenazic pronunciation of the Hebrew Magen David, which literally means "shield of David" and is used metaphorically to refer to the six-pointed Star of David.

== Products ==
Mogen David wine is sold in 750mL, 1.5L, and 3L bottles. It is also Kosher for Passover.

Mogen David Concord Red wine is made from must of no less than 51% Concord grapes, an American grape variety, which is typically used for grape juices, jellies, and preserves, but also used for Kosher wines. This makes the wine less expensive, averaging $5 per bottle. In addition to Concord red, Mogen David also markets Blackberry and Pomegranate wines.

== History ==
Founded months before the Repeal of Prohibition by Max Cohen and Henry Markus in Chicago, the California Wine Company bottled medicinal and sacramental wines, changing its name to Wine Corporation of America in 1941 when it began making wine from Concord grape juice (or concentrate) shipped from growers in New York, Pennsylvania, Ohio and later Michigan.

=== Chicago winery ===
Following World War II the company purchased a 50,000 square foot (4,600 m^{2}) building at 3737 South Sacramento Ave in Chicago's Brighton Park neighborhood which was converted into one of the largest wineries in the Midwestern United States. The entire winery was allocated to a single product, Mogen David, a kosher wine originally marketed for the Passover Seder that became popular year-round with the general public. Annual production of Mogen David was 75,000 US gallons (280,000 L; 62,000 imp gal) in 1946. Wine Corporation of America began advertising Mogen David nationally in 1947; by the early 1950s the advertising budget for Mogen David was the fourth or fifth largest for wines. Max Cohen, company President and founder, said in 1952 that 98 percent of Mogen David's customers were not Jewish.

Annual production of Mogen David increased to more than 3,000,000 US gallons (11,000,000 L; 2,500,000 imp gal) of wine in 1949 and to nearly 5,000,000 US gallons (19,000,000 L; 4,200,000 imp gal) for 1953, and in that year Wine Corporation of America took the name of its most important product, becoming the Mogen David Wine Corporation.

In 1955 Mogen David announced the purchase of new plant facilities at 3700 South Kedzie Ave, about 2,000 feet (610 m) from the main plant on Sacramento Ave, designed to triple its capacity and enable production of two additional wines. The company launched a new line of wines under a different brand name, Key, in 1957. This marketing campaign was unsuccessful, and the new line was dropped after three years.

In the early 1960s concord wine was still the biggest seller in the Mogen David line, along with a rosé, a blackberry wine, a cherry wine and a dry red wine.

Company founder and chairman Max Cohen announced his resignation on 8 January 1962, citing friction with his brother-in-law Henry A. Markus, who was president of the company. Cohen sold all of his stock to Markus, saying that "I am no longer connected with the firm and I have no interest in it."

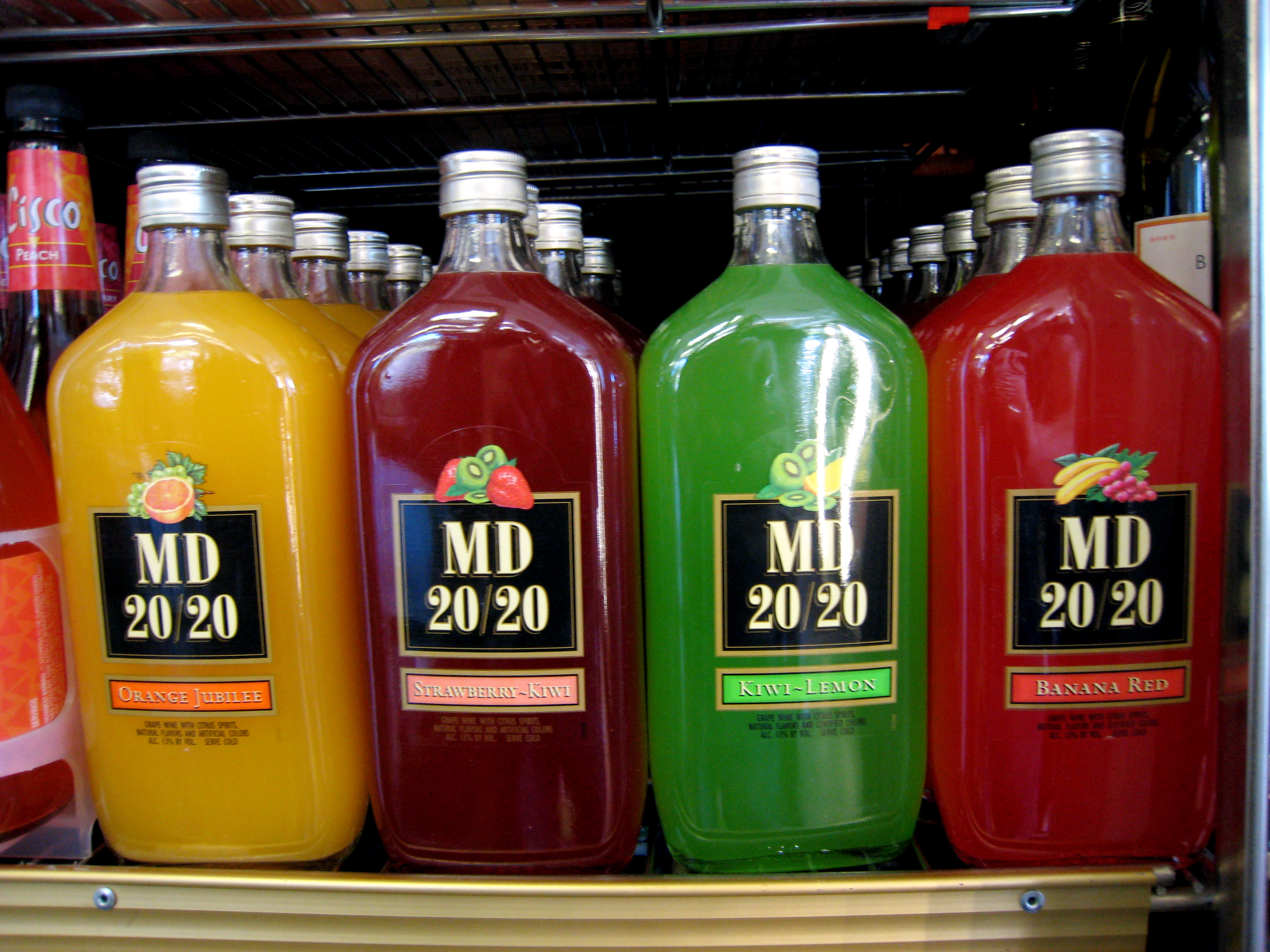
A selection of several flavors from the MD 20/20 line

The sale of a controlling interest in Mogen David to Richard T. Schofield of Westfield, New York was announced on 9 May 1963, with Schofield taking over as president of the company and Markus appointed chairman. Some operations were moved to Westfield in 1967; Mogen David's Westfield winery was closer to the vineyards in the Northeast that grow Concord grapes for its wines, the Chicago plants remained open.

By 1968, Mogen David produced a dozen different wines and two kinds of sparkling wine. The company broke away from its conventional Mogen David line with the introduction of the MD 20/20 brand (Note: The "20/20" originally stood for the wine's 20% ABV in a 20 ounce [591 ml] flask-shaped bottle. The alcohol content was later lowered to between 16% and 18% ABV (depending on the variety). The bottle was upsized to 750 ml after the US went through metrification between 1976 and 1980.) of flavored fortified wines that were well received by younger consumers, especially college students. The MD 20/20 line included unusual flavors including pink grapefruit, wild berry, and Hawaiian blue.

=== Acquisition by Coke-New York ===
In 1970 the Coca-Cola Bottling Company of New York was the largest soft drink bottler in the world, having merged with the Coca-Cola Bottling Company of New Haven (acquired in 1969) but its growth prospects were limited by the franchise boundaries. When Coke-New York was approached by an investment banking firm to let them know that Mogen David was for sale, they saw an opportunity to become a major competitor in a new industry (Mogen David was the sixth largest winery and the largest Concord grape wine producer in the country) and to pick up a national sales and distribution network. Coke-New York acquired Mogen David on 1 November 1970 by paying $16,750,000 in cash. J. Myron "Mike" Bay was an officer in both companies: President of Mogen David as well as a VP of Coke-New York.

By 1972 Mogen David was producing 27,000 US gallons (100,000 L; 22,000 imp gal) a day in Westfield, NY and 80,000 US gallons (300,000 L; 67,000 imp gal) a day from the two plants in Chicago, for an estimated annual output of 13,000,000 US gallons (49,000,000 L; 11,000,000 imp gal). Mogen David company introduced a "pop wine" product line, Cold Bear (Concord) and Black Bear (blackberry), leading to overall growth in sales of 32 percent for 1972. Mogen David had a staff of over 45 salesmen. Mogen David wines and Tribuno vermouths were marketed nationally through over 300 independent distributors in 1972, in order to strengthen their market position, New York Coca-Cola began consolidating Tribuno and Mogen David distribution networks.

The Jug line of strawberry and apple pop wines, packaged in country-style brown and white jugs, was introduced in 1973. Mogen David had the fourth largest winery and the third largest advertising budget in the wine industry in 1973.

With its 1973 acquisitions of Tribuno Wines (previously Vermouth Industries of America) and later the well established California winery Franzia, Coke-New York was, in all, the third largest US wine producer. Franzia also shipped wine, grape concentrates and brandy in bulk to the Mogen David winery in Westfield, New York, for use in Mogen David products.

Jerome W. "Jerry" Alder joined Mogen David as President and COO in September 1976; former President Mike Bay moved into the new position of Chairman, and continued as Mogen David's CEO. In 1977, the company's administrative and marketing offices moved from the original winery at 3737 South Sacramento Ave, and into space in a new building at 444 Michigan Ave in downtown Chicago.

A study of wine marketing in 1980 found that Mogen David consumers apparently had the strongest brand loyalty in the varietal table wine category.

=== Acquisition by The Wine Group ===
Discussions between The Coca-Cola Company and The Coca-Cola Bottling Company of New York about a possible acquisition of the latter began in 1974, to little effect.

When merger discussions resumed in 1980, The Coca-Cola Company had already entered the alcoholic beverage market; their Wine Spectrum subsidiary consisting of wineries in California and New York. As part of the proposed merger, The Coca-Cola Company agreed to sell the wine business of Coke-New York to a partnership formed by First Boston and top-level managers of the New York bottler's wine business. Coke-New York divested itself of its three wineries, which were bought in 1981 by The Wine Group, a limited partnership headed by Arthur A. Ciocca, to avoid a buyout involving a third party. The Wine Group was the fifth largest wine producer nationally (just behind Coca-Cola's Wine Spectrum) for 1981 with sales of nine million cases, the same as the year before.

In 1998, 1.5 million adults were drinking Mogen David, putting it just ahead of its chief competitor Manischewitz. By 2005, Manischewitz was again dominant with more than half of kosher wine sales, Mogen David was second with 33 percent of the market.

== See also ==
- MD 20/20
