= Jabol =

Kind of Polish fruit wine

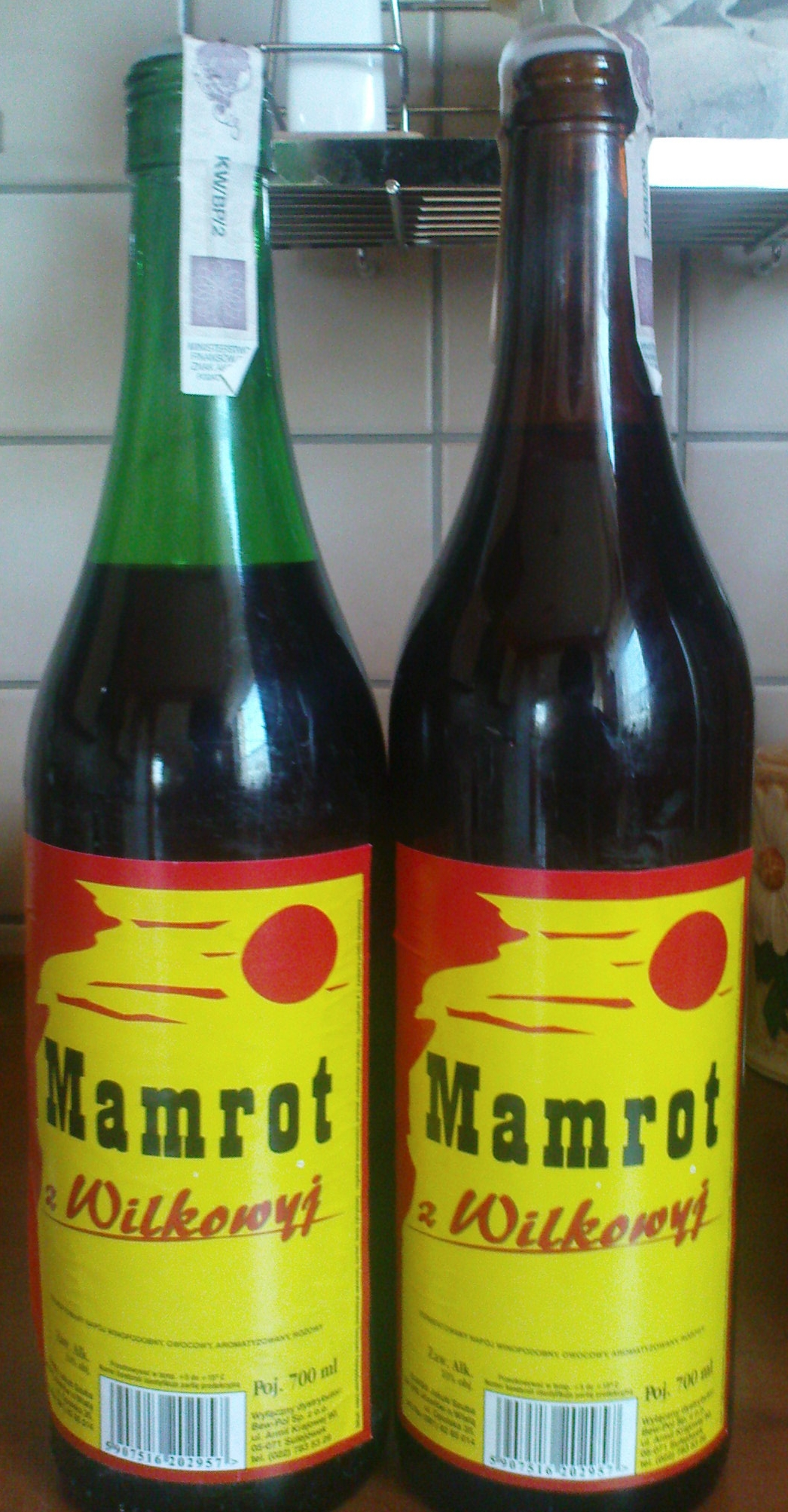
- Bottles of Mamrot brand jabol
- Type: Fruit wine
- Origin: Poland, Central Europe
- Alcohol by volume: 8–18%
- Ingredients: fermented fruits

Jabol (Polish pronunciation: [ˈjabɔl]) is a slang name for a kind of cheap Polish fruit wine. It is made from fermented fruit and is bottled at 8% to 18% alcohol by volume. Its name is derived from Polish: jabłko, "apple", from which it is often made. Though it is usually fruit flavoured, it can come in other flavours such as chocolate or mint. It comes in a variety of containers and is sold under a variety of names.

== History ==
Jabol was first developed in post-war Poland as a cheap alcohol produced from the apple orchards that had been cultivated in the former-Prussian areas of the Recovered Territories.

The drink gained a reputation as an unsophisticated alcoholic beverage consumed by youths intending to get drunk quickly and cheaply.

== Slang names ==
Apart from jabol or jabcok, this beverage has amassed a variety of colourful slang names. Two that are commonly encountered are sikacz (a reference to the effect of alcohol on urination) and siarkofrut (a reference to the Bobofrut brand of children's fruit juice, as well as to the wine's taste of sulfur, a result from its low-quality production process).

== Packaging and price ==
Jabol is sold in glass and plastic bottles or cartons (similar to milk or juice cartons). Sometimes a deposit is required on bottles, which is usually 20–30% of the wine price.

== In popular culture ==
- Pieniądze to nie wszystko – comedy film by Juliusz Machulski from 2000
- Jabol punk, Jabolowe ofiary (Jabol victims or Jabol losers) – songs by KSU from the album Pod prąd.
- Tanie Wino (Cheap wine) – song by Haratacze
- SO2 – song by Zielone Żabki (sulfur dioxide reference)
- Acid Drinkers – Polish thrash metal band. The name is a reference to the drink.
- Autobiografia – one of the most popular songs by the Polish band Perfect.
- Arizona – documentary by Ewa Borzęcka from 1997, showing life in poor Polish village.
- O Jeden Most Za Daleko (One bridge too far) – song from 2022 by a heavy metal band Nocny Kochanek.

== See also ==
- Flavored fortified wines
- Jug wine
- Plonk (wine)
- Bormotukha, Russian equivalent
