= Plonk =

Plonk may refer to:

- Plonk (wine), poor quality wine
- Ronnie Lane or Plonk, British musician and member of Small Faces
- Dr. Plonk, a 2007 Australian film, directed by Rolf de Heer
- Plonk (TV series), a 2014 Australian TV series
