= Plonk (wine) =

British and Australian slang term

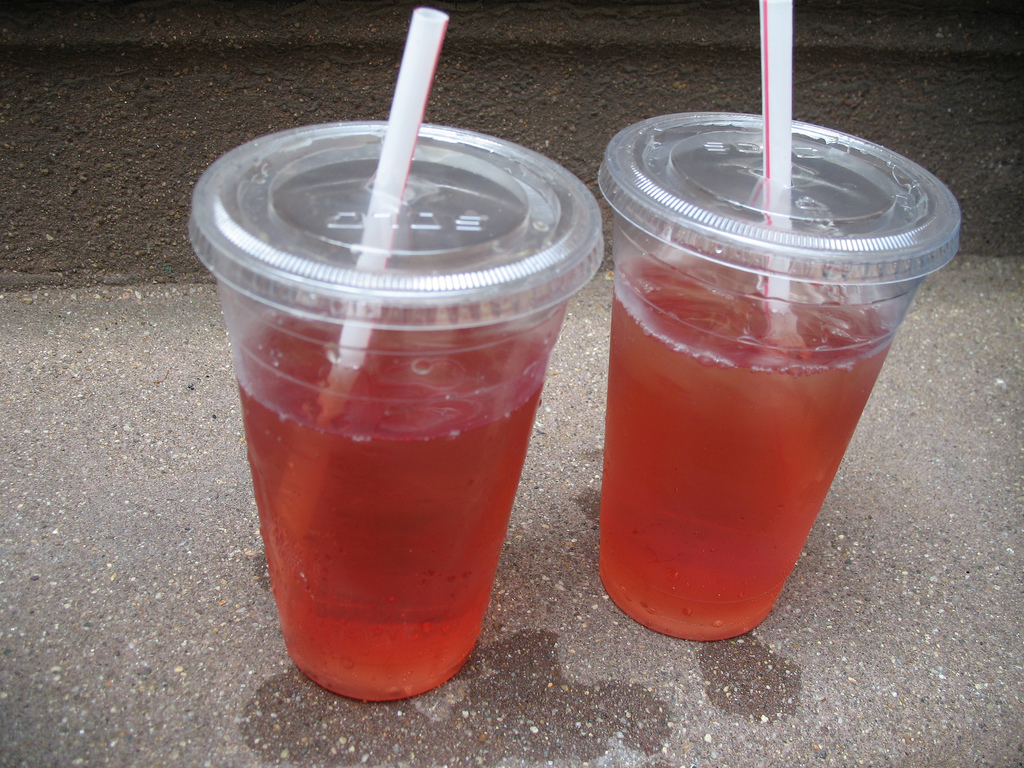
Wine (a White Zinfandel) in drinkware befitting plonk

Plonk is a term used primarily in Commonwealth English for generally cheap, low-quality wine. Some believe it to come from Australian slang, in reference to blanc (the French word for "white"), before it became naturalised in Britain. Despite the reference to the colour white, the term is not limited to white wine, and can as easily indicate a red wine or rosé.

In Australia, plonk packaged and sold in a cask or simply in a bag is commonly called "goon". In New Zealand, such wine sold in a cask is often referred to as "Château Cardboard".

The term has also been adopted in other Commonwealth countries, particularly in Canada.

== Other usages ==
The term is not always used in a wholly derogatory manner. It can indicate a degree of strange affection for the wine in question. Telegraph journalist Max Davidson has equated plonk with "youth, ... excess, ... self-indulgence in times of penury. Forget grown-up wine. With plonk, the sweetest bouquet of all is the taste of a few pence saved."

Today, the term can often be used to indicate that a particular social gathering is not a fancy affair. For example, if a party guest is worried about the social level of the occasion, a host might assuage his or her concerns with the phrase: "Oh, just bring a bottle of plonk." In Willy Russell's play Educating Rita, working-class Rita decides she cannot attend a party to which academic Frank has invited her, since she is ashamed of the wine she has bought and feels out-of-place. When Rita reports her anxieties to Frank the following week, he castigates Rita for being too self-conscious, reassuring her: "It wouldn't have mattered if you'd walked in carrying a bottle of Spanish plonk."

Another well-known usage of the word was that of Horace Rumpole, the title character of John Mortimer's television series "Rumpole of the Bailey" (1975–1992), who orders "bottles of plonk" with colleagues at Pomeroy's Wine Bar.

== Health concerns ==
The Alcohol (Minimum Pricing) (Scotland) Act 2012 is an Act of the Scottish Parliament, which introduces a statutory minimum price for alcohol, initially 50p per unit, as an element in the programme to counter alcohol problems.

Minimum Unit Pricing (MUP) for alcohol is a policy measure being considered for adoption in several countries, including Ireland, Switzerland, Wales, and Poland, pending evidence of its effectiveness. In Scotland, despite strong public and parliamentary support, the implementation of MUP has faced legal challenges from the spirits industry. The passage suggests that instead of opposing such health-oriented policies, the alcohol industry could adopt less harmful business models. It cites France as an example, where the wine industry successfully transitioned from selling inexpensive "plonk" to quality wines produced in specified regions, resulting in increased profits and a reduction in deaths from alcoholic liver disease.

== See also ==
- Box wine
- Flavored fortified wine
- Jabol
- Jug wine
