= Bormotukha =

Russian fortified wines

Bormotukha (Russian бормотуха) and chernila (literally ink) were colloquial names for cheap flavored fortified wines, commonly named "port wine" or "vermouth", that were produced in the Soviet Union. Examples of bormotukha were Agdam (named after a city in Azerbaijan) Solntsedar and Port wine 777 (colloquially called "Three Axes").

One of the sources of inexpensive wine material was Algeria, with which a long-term contract was concluded after it gained independence, with the aim of drawing it into the "socialist sphere". The wine material was transported to the USSR by tankers, and fortified wines were then produced locally on its basis.

During Mikhail Gorbachev’s anti-alcohol campaign, production of legal bormotukha brands stopped, and the corresponding brands didn't recover.

In 2010 a Russian businessman tried to register the trademark "Solntsedar". The application was rejected with the rationale: "The applied designation reproduces the name of a cheap surrogate alcoholic drink, widespread in the USSR from the late 50s to the mid-80s, which received a household name as an image and sign of the era of stagnation, and therefore registration of this designation as a trademark will be contrary to public interests."

In Belarus, President Alexander Lukashenko declared production of beer to be an element of "national food security", because beer "pulls people away from drinking bormotukha and hard liquors".

== See also ==
- Jabol, Polish equivalent
