= Flavored fortified wine =

Category of alcoholic beverages

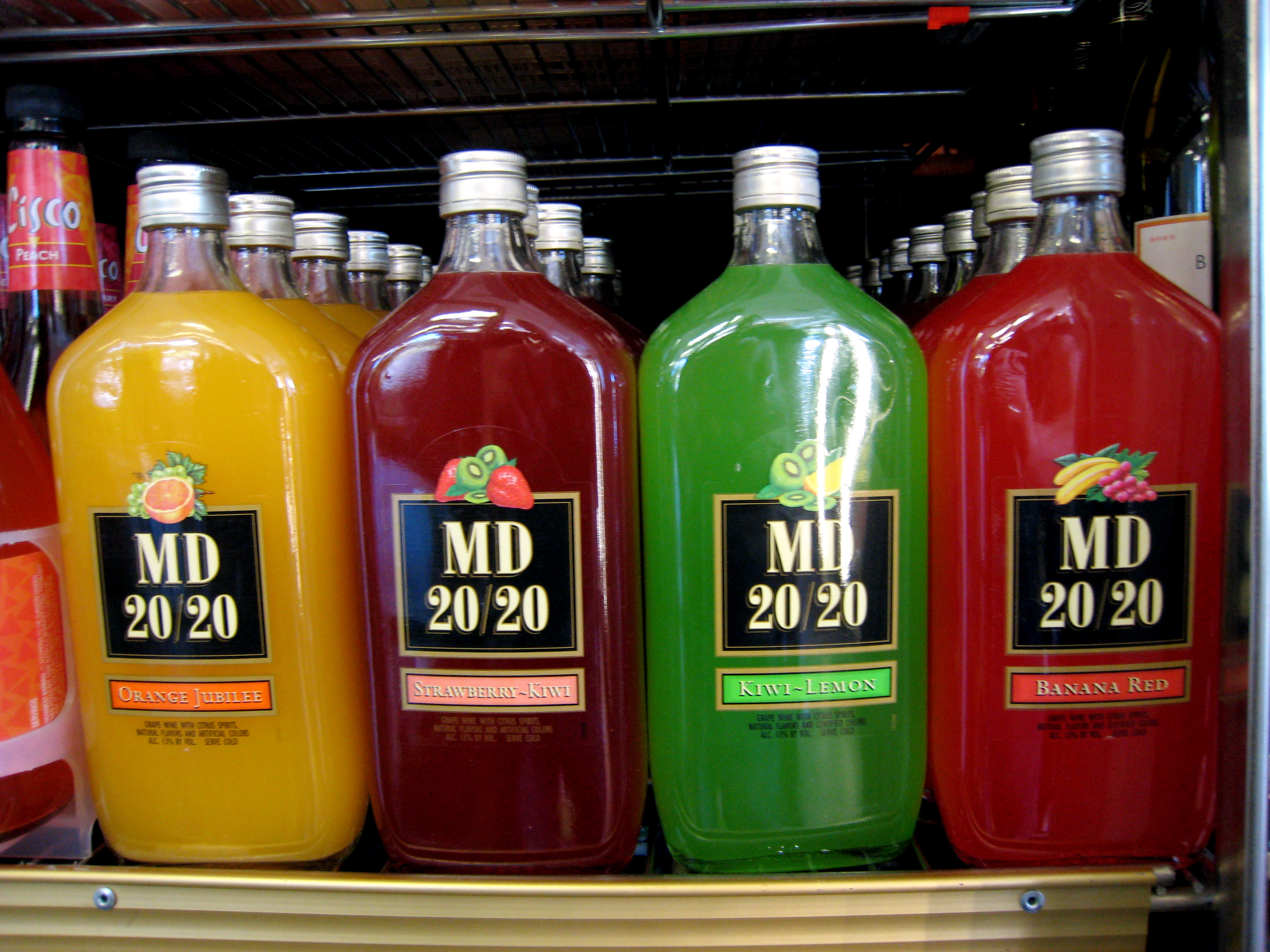
MD 20/20 bottles

Flavored fortified wine or tonic wine is inexpensive fortified wine that typically has an alcohol content between 13% and 20% alcohol by volume (ABV). They are made from various fruits (including grapes and citrus fruits) with added sugar, artificial flavor, and artificial color. These wines are referred to by a number of slang terms, including sneaky Pete, bum wine, brown-bag vino, ghetto wine, and rotgut.

== Brands ==
- Bormotukha (Russian: бормотуха) was a colloquial name for cheap fortified wines, named 'port wines' or 'vermouths', that were produced in the Soviet Union. One brand, Solntsedar (Russian: Солнцедар), was named after a town on the Black Sea where it was produced. It was infamous for many severe cases of alcohol poisoning and for inducing vomiting. Bormotukha production ended during Mikhail Gorbachev’s anti-alcohol campaign
- Buckfast Tonic Wine is a tonic wine with added alcohol, caffeine, and sugar, produced under license from Buckfast Abbey, a Roman Catholic monastery located in Devon, England. Critics have blamed it for causing social problems.
- MD 20/20 (often called by its nickname "Mad Dog") is an American fortified wine. The MD stands for its producer, Mogen David. MD 20/20 has an alcohol content that varies by flavor from 13% to 18%. When introduced, 20/20 stood for 20 oz at 20% alcohol, but the product is no longer sold either in 20 oz bottles or at 20% alcohol by volume.
- Wild Russian Vanya was a fortified fruit wine vinted and bottled by the Seabord Beverage Co and sold in the southeastern United States during the late 1960s and early 1970s. In 1971, a quart cost $1.25 ($10 in 2025).
- Two notable brands are produced by the Centerra Wine Company (a division of Constellation Brands).

- Cisco is a fortified wine with varieties selling at 13.9%, 17.5%, and 19.5% alcohol by volume (ABV). It has a syrupy consistency and a sweet flavor. Because of its original color and bottle shape, it was frequently mistaken for a wine cooler. The Federal Trade Commission eventually required the company to put labels on their bottles stating that Cisco is not a wine cooler, to change the shape and color of their containers, and to recall their advertising slogan "Takes you by surprise".

- Richards Wild Irish Rose was introduced in 1954 and, at its height, sold about two million cases annually. The brand is available in 13.9% and 18% alcohol by volume and comes in both "red" and "white" varieties. The red is described as tasting like "cheap cherry hard candy" and the white like "crunchy milk and fake vanilla".

- Three popular brands in this category have been produced by the E & J Gallo Winery and were a large part of that company's early success.
  - Ripple was a fortified and lightly carbonated wine that was popular in the United States, particularly in the 1970s (and popularized by Fred G. Sanford of Sanford and Son). Possessing a low 11% ABV (lower than modern table wines), it was originally marketed to "casual" drinkers. Due to its low price, it gained a negative reputation as a drink for destitute alcoholics. It was popular among young drinkers, both underage and college students. It was later replaced with Boone's Farm.
  - Night Train Express, usually abbreviated to Night Train, typically contains 17.5% ABV. Night Train Express has been condemned by civic leaders who believe inexpensive high-alcohol content beverages contribute to vagrancy and public drunkenness.
  - Thunderbird (The American Classic), a flavored, fortified wine of 13–18% ABV. Ernest Gallo ordered the development of the wine upon discovering that inexpensive white port wine was popular in the inner city and skid row neighborhoods, where shopkeepers would display lemon juice bottles and Kool-Aid packets next to the wine, which patrons would purchase to mix with the port and produce their desired flavor. In 1957 it sold for 60 cents ($7 in 2025), at a time when the federal minimum wage was $1 per hour ($11 in 2025) Gallo salesmen allegedly dropped empty Thunderbird bottles in the streets of skid-row neighborhoods to build brand awareness among city "wino" populations. The wine became so popular among the indigent that Ernest Gallo recounted a story in which he encountered a wino drinking on a sidewalk in Atlanta, and upon asking him, "What's the word?", the man shouted "Thunderbird!" after which both laughed. Another salesman told of giving free samples to alcoholics and newly released prisoners.

== History ==
An early reference to the problem of cheap and poorly made wines is in the "Report on Cheap Wines" in the 5 November 1864 issue of The Medical Times and Gazette. The author, in prescribing inexpensive wines for several ills, cautions against the "fortified" wines of the day, describing one sample that he had tried:

When the cork was drawn it was scarcely tinted, and was a very bad one—a thing of no good augury for the wine. There was no smell of port wine. The liquid, when tasted, gave the palate half-a-dozen sensations instead of one. There was a hot taste of spirits, a sweet taste, a fruity taste like damsons, and an unmistakable flavor of Roussillon [an alternative name in France for wine made from the grape Grenache]. It was a strong, unwholesome liquor, purchased very dearly.

It is reported, however, that the popularity of cheap, fortified wines in the United States arose in the 1930s as a product of Prohibition and the Great Depression:

Prohibition produced the Roaring Twenties and fostered more beer and distilled-spirit drinkers than wine drinkers, because the raw materials were easier to come by. But fortified wine, or medicinal wine tonic—containing about 20 percent alcohol, which made it more like a distilled spirit than regular wine—was still available and became America's number one wine. Thunderbird and Wild Irish Rose, to name two examples, are fortified wines. American wine was soon more popular for its effect than its taste; in fact, the word wino came into use during the Depression to describe those unfortunate souls who turned to fortified wine to forget their troubles.

== Concerns and media attention ==
While overtaken somewhat in the low-end alcoholic drink market by sweetened malt beverages by the 1990s, the appeal of cheap fortified wines to the poor and homeless has often raised concerns:

Community groups in Los Angeles, San Francisco, Seattle, and Portland have urged makers of fortified wines such as Wild Irish Rose and E & J Gallo's Thunderbird and Night Train brands to pull their products from the shelves of liquor retailers in skid row areas. In Nashville, Tennessee, one liquor store owner told Nashville Business Journal reporter Julie Hinds that police warned him to stop selling his biggest selling product, Wild Irish Rose, because it encouraged homeless people to linger in the area.

In 2005, the Seattle City Council asked the Washington State Liquor Control Board to prohibit the sale of certain alcohol products in an impoverished "Alcohol Impact Area". Among the products sought to be banned were over two dozen beers and six wines: Cisco, Gino's Premium Blend, MD 20/20, Night Train, Thunderbird, and Wild Irish Rose. The Liquor Control Board approved these restrictions on 30 August 2006. Two other cities in Washington, Tacoma and Spokane, also followed suit in instituting "Alcohol Impact Areas", after Seattle's example.

== See also ==
- Aromatized wine
- Ginger wine
- Ice beer
- Jabol
- Jug wine
- Malt liquor
- Muscatel
- Rotgut
- Scotsmac
