= Pommeau =

French alcoholic drink of apple juice mixed with apple brandy

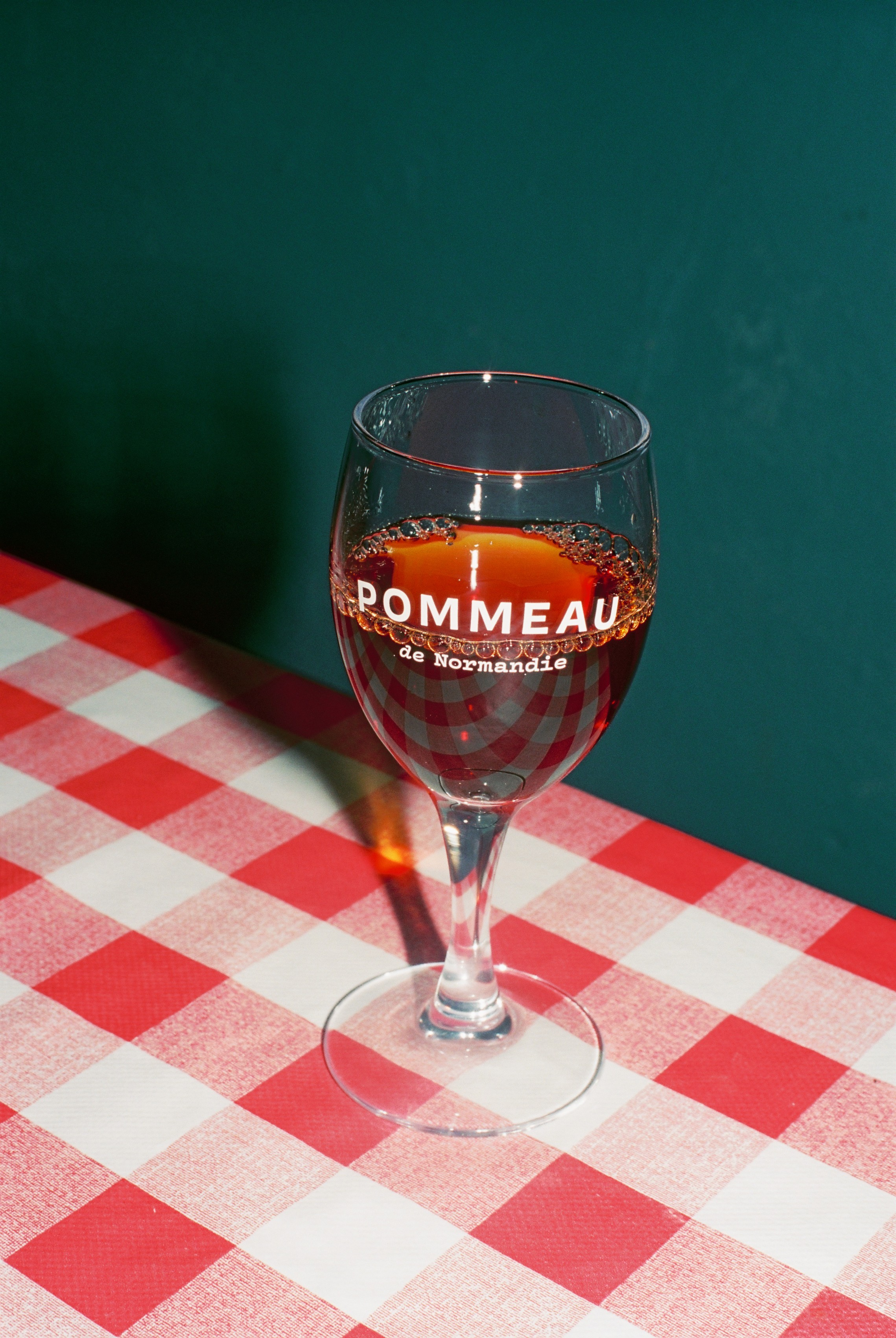
A glass of Pommeau de Normandie.

Pommeau is an alcoholic drink made in north-western France by mixing apple juice with apple brandy: Calvados in Normandy (Pommeau de Normandie) or lambig in Brittany (Pommeau de Bretagne).

Considered a mistelle, it is generally consumed as an apéritif or as an accompaniment to melon or blue cheese. It is also popular with a variety of desserts, including any chocolate- or apple-based dishes.

== Production ==
Pommeau is made by mixing two-thirds apple must (unfermented apple juice) to one-third of one-year-old Calvados. The proportions are chosen to ensure that the resulting mixture has 16–18% alcohol by volume.

The liquid is then put into vats and stirred gently, before being moved to large oak barrels and left to age for at least 14 months.

The resulting drink is mahogany in color with a bright luster, and has an overall smooth taste, often with vanilla, caramel and butterscotch flavors.

Production is controlled by three appellations covering manufacture in Brittany, Normandy and Maine: Pommeau de Bretagne, Pommeau de Normandie and Pommeau du Maine.
