= Cisco (wine) =

Fortified wine brand

- Type: Flavored fortified wine
- Distributor: Canandaigua Wine Company
- Origin: United States
- Introduced: 1985
- Alcohol by volume: 20
- Proof (US): 40

Cisco is an American brand of flavored fortified wine produced by Canandaigua Wine Company. It is produced in a variety of fruit flavors and is known for its high alcohol content.

In 1991, the brand was criticized for allegedly deceptive marketing that presented the 20% alcohol by volume (ABV) wine as being comparable to low-alcohol content beverages like wine coolers (4% ABV by average). The Canandaigua Wine Company changed Cisco's branding and packaging in 1991 after the Federal Trade Commission launched a complaint against the company.

== Description ==
Cisco is a dessert wine fortified with grape brandy. It has been produced in a variety of fruit flavors including "red", "orange", "peach", "berry", "gold", "black cherry", "blue raspberry" and "strawberry". Journalist Julia Flynn Siler wrote that Cisco was "a syrupy hooch that has been described as tasting like fruit-flavored Robitussin mixed with liquid Jell-O and two-hundred-proof vodka." A 2015 review of strawberry Cisco by Andy Kryza of Thrillist described it as having "the consistency of watered-down cough syrup and sugar, but none of the flavor of traditional sizurp."

The wine contained 20% alcohol by volume (ABV). By comparison, wine coolers had only 4% ABV on average. Consumption of Cisco was reported to result in effects such as combative behavior, hallucinations and loss of consciousness. Because of its strength, it was colloquially known as "liquid crack".

== Marketing ==
Canandaigua used the slogan "Takes you by surprise!" for Cisco, and it was primarily marketed towards low-income communities and African-American consumers. Despite its strength, 12oz/ 375ml bottles of Cisco were marketed to consumers as single serving beverages prior to 1991. Bottles of Cisco were also commonly stocked next to low alcohol content wine coolers in stores. A 1995 survey found that 36% of high school students were unsure whether Cisco contained alcohol, and more than half did not realize it contained more alcohol than beer or malt liquor.

== History ==
Cisco was introduced in 1985, and the brand was acquired by the Canandaigua Wine Company in 1988. The drink was popular among teenagers due to its inexpensiveness and selection of flavors. A 375-milliliter bottle cost $1.50 in 1990, while a 750-milliliter bottle cost $2.50.

In 1991, Cisco consumption was linked to multiple cases of alcohol poisoning in teenagers, with the Children's National Medical Center in Washington D.C. reporting that 10 out of the 15 cases of adolescent alcoholism treated there had involved Cisco. Cisco consumption was also partly blamed by the media for an incident in which teenagers threw rocks from an overpass on the Capital Beltway onto traffic below.

A public campaign was launched to make retailers stop stocking the wine, and to pressure the company to cease selling Cisco. Multiple organizations, including the National Council on Alcoholism and Drug Dependence, the Center for Science in the Public Interest, the National Alcoholism Council and Mothers Against Drunk Driving were involved in the campaign. In response to the campaign, the convenience store chain 7-Eleven stopped selling Cisco.

Also in 1991, the Federal Trade Commission (FTC) launched a complaint against the Canandaigua Wine Company, alleging that the flavor varieties, packaging, and branding of Cisco deceptively resembled low alcohol beverages which could be safely consumed as a single serving. The chairman of the House Select Committee on Youth and the Surgeon General of the United States, Antonia Novello, also urged the company to change the marketing and packaging of the wine. The company reached a consent agreement with the FTC that involved them changing the branding of Cisco and no longer marketing it as a single-serving beverage.

=== Drug culture ===
Cisco has been noted to be popular among some communities of drug users. A study of homeless intravenous drug users in San Francisco between 1994 and 2006 found that daily alcohol consumption was common among participants, "primarily inexpensive, twelve-ounce bottles of Cisco Berry fortified wine". A 2006 study of ethnic differences between heroin users found that white heroin users tended to supplement their psychoactive substance use with Cisco Berry wine, while African-American heroin users tended to prefer crack cocaine.

== In popular culture ==
Cisco has been described as being a component of rap culture. The drink was frequently referenced in rap lyrics, and was described by Ice Cube as one of his favorite drinks. Uncle Luke's debut solo album I Got Shit on My Mind (1992) includes the track "Cisco".

Paul Beatty noted Cisco's popularity among "white college hepsters at the University of Mercury" and "Aspen-ski-vacation, company car drivin'" black men who wanted to imitate rap culture. Randall Kenan, in his book Walking on Water: Black American Lives at the Turn of the Twenty-First Century, criticized the marketing of Cisco and other alcohol brands towards Black youth as part of rap culture. Kenan wrote that it was "the worst rotgut you could get" and described it as "not like any other liquor".

In his memoir, The Blues Man, Melvyn "Deacon" Jones wrote that the difference between rock and roll musicians and jazz musicians was that "jazz aficionados drink cognac and we drink Cisco wine."
