= Scotsmac =

Drink consisting of a blend of wine and whisky flavoring

A bottle of Scotsmac which described itself as a blend of Mature British Wine and Fine Whiskey. The design incorporates a thistle motif and an image of a Scottish castle and loch but the rear label says: bottled for Constellation Europe Ltd., Guildford (southeast England).

Scotsmac was an alcoholic drink consisting of a blend of wine and whisky flavouring. It was sold in 700ml bottles from discount supermarket stores such as Netto and Lidl across the United Kingdom. Scotsmac had a strength of 15%. Also known as the "Bam's Dram" or "Wham's Dram", it was once blended by D & L Ariano, imported and bottled by J.H. Wham & Son (Largs) Ltd. It was bottled for Accolade Wines in Guildford, Surrey but was discontinued in 2018 as a result of reduced demand.
