= Night Train Express =

Fortified wine brand

- Type: Flavored fortified wine
- Manufacturer: E. & J. Gallo Winery
- Distributor: E. & J. Gallo Winery
- Origin: United States
- Alcohol by volume: 17.5
- Proof (US): 35
- Color: Red

Night Train Express, typically referred to as just Night Train, was a discount, flavored fortified wine produced by E. & J. Gallo Winery in the United States. It was one of several low-cost, high-alcohol fortified wines marketed in the late 20th century, was fortified with brandy to increase its strength, and typically contained 17.5–18% alcohol by volume (ABV)

Along with Thunderbird, Night Train Express was one of Gallo’s fortified wine brands most closely associated with this market segment.

The wine was discontinued in 2016 following a gradual decline in sales that coincided with a 1989 temporary withdrawal from shelves. By the late 1980s, the product had become closely associated with controversy over cheap fortified wines in urban neighborhoods and social problems.

== History ==
Night Train Express was one of Gallo's best known fortified wine brands during the late 20^{th} century. Contemporary reporting noted that fortified wines were sold for between 90 cents and $1.50 per three-quarter-liter bottle and could reach up to 20% ABV. However, like all discount, fortified wines, Night Train Express was controversial amongst civic leaders in major cities who often attributed it to a rise in vagrancy and public drunkenness of homeless people.

The wine has been described as a "cheap way to get drunk fast" and "as usually hidden by brown bags on Tenderloin street corners." Efforts to restrict sales varied by city and developed over time. In 1989, amid sustained pressure from community groups and local officials, Gallo agreed to limit sales and marketing of Night Train Express in "skid row" neighborhoods and directed distributors to restrict supply in those neighborhoods. The same year, the Los Angeles County Board of Supervisors called for a voluntary ban on fortified wine sales in a 70-block downtown district. Other cities, including San Francisco and Seattle, also banned the sale of Night Train in downtown and skid row areas. Later reporting indicated that such measures had uneven long-term effects: A 1996 San Francisco Chronicle article reported that cheap fortified wine remained concentrated in poorer neighborhoods, including San Francisco’s Tenderloin and Oakland’s Lafayette Square.

== Cultural reception ==
The wine inspired the song "Nightrain" on the album Appetite for Destruction by Guns N' Roses. The wine is referenced in the song "See You Later", on the album Mic City Sons by indie rock band Heatmiser, the lyric is unchanged in the Elliott Smith rerecorded version from the posthumously released album New Moon. It was repeatedly referenced in the 1980 film The Blues Brothers, most notably in a scene in which Joliet Jake finishes a bottle and later proclaims "That Night Train is a mean wine".
