= Jug wine =

American term for inexpensive table wine

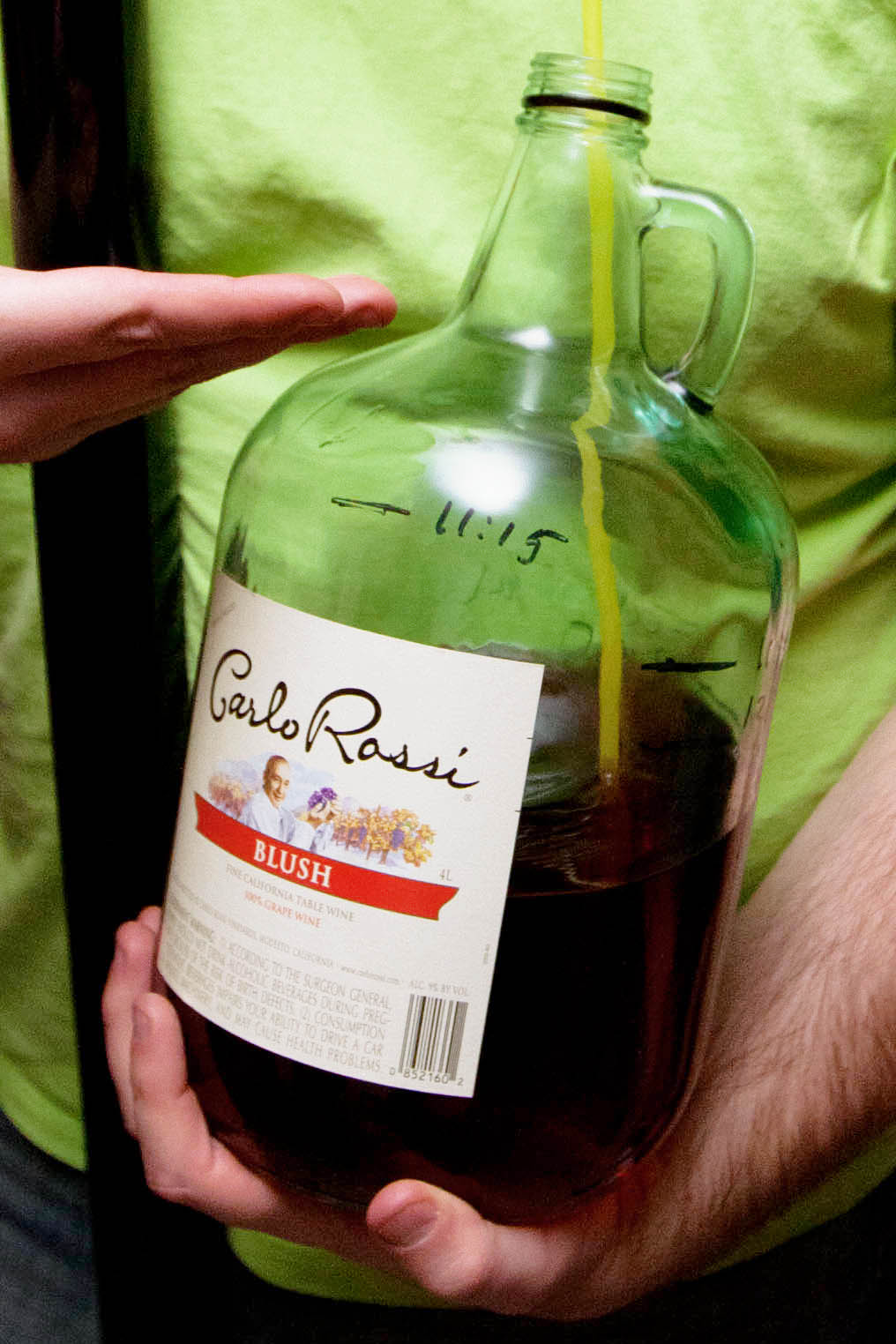
An open bottle of Carlo Rossi jug wine with a drinking straw.

"Jug wine" is a term in the United States for inexpensive table wine typically bottled in a glass bottle or jug.

Historically, jug wines were labeled semi-generically, often sold to third parties to be relabeled, or sold directly from the winery's tasting room to customers who would often bring their own bottles. For a period following Prohibition, jug wines were the only domestic wine available for most Americans. Beginning in the 1960s, when Americans began to consume more premium wine, jug wine took on a reputation for being "extreme value" (bargain-priced premium wine). Beginning in the late 1980s jug wines have increasingly been labeled varietally to meet consumer demand.

== Common brands ==
Common brands include Gallo, Carlo Rossi, Almaden Vineyards, and Inglenook Winery. Typical formats include 750 ml and one liter glass bottles, as well as three and five-liter jugs. More recent packaging methods include lined boxes, and plastic bags inside corrugated fiberboard boxes ("bag in a box").

A refilling station for wine jugs in a winery.

== See also ==
- Box wine
- Fighting varietal
- Flavored fortified wine
- Plonk (wine)
