= Lambig =

Brandy from Breton, France

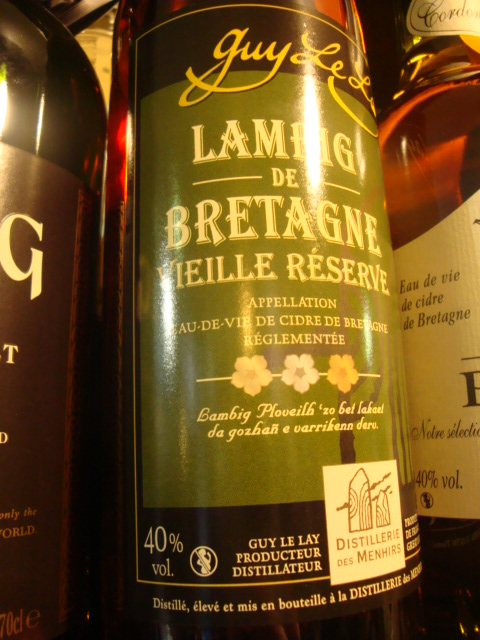
Lambig de Bretagne

Lambig (also known as Fine Bretagne, gwinardant, eau de vie or lagout) is a Breton brandy produced by distilling cider. Per AOC, lambig must be aged for a minimum of two years on oak. The beverage is equivalent to the Calvados of Normandy.

Lambig can be added to apple juice to fortify it, creating pommeau de Bretagne.
