= Calvados (brandy) =

French apple brandy

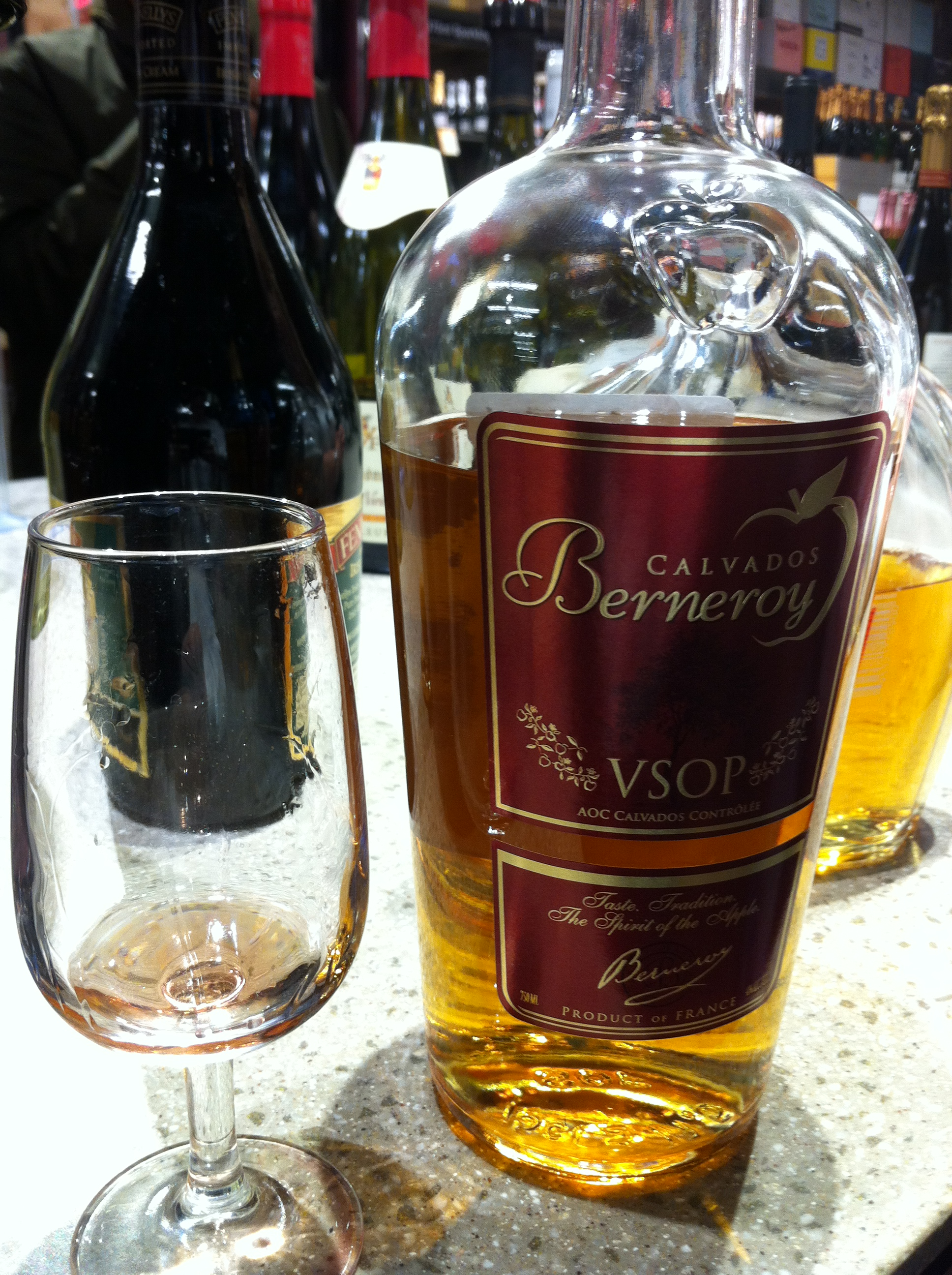

Calvados (UK: /ˈkælvədɒs/, US: /-doʊs, ˌkælvəˈdoʊs, ˌkɑːlvəˈ-/, French: [kalvados]) is a brandy from Normandy in France, made from cider apples or pears.

== History ==
=== In France ===
Apple orchards and brewers are mentioned as far back as the 8th century by Charlemagne. The first known record of Norman distillation was made by squire Gilles de Gouberville in 1553, and the guild for cider distillation was created about 50 years later in 1606. In the 17th century, traditional cider farms expanded, but taxation and prohibition of cider brandies were enforced elsewhere, outside Brittany, Maine, and Normandy. The term "calvados" was coined after the French Revolution, but eau de vie de cidre was already commonly called calvados.

In the 19th century, output increased with industrial distillation and the working-class fashion for café-calva. When a phylloxera outbreak in the late 19th century devastated vineyards across France and Europe, calvados experienced a golden age. During World War I, cider brandy was requisitioned to produce explosives for the armament industry because of its alcohol content. The appellation contrôlée regulations officially gave AOC Calvados Pays d'Auge a protected name in 1942. After the war, many cider houses and distilleries were reconstructed, mainly in the Pays d'Auge. Many of the traditional farmhouse structures were replaced by modern, high-output agricultural systems. The calvados appellation system was revised in 1984 and 1996. Pommeau got its recognition in 1991; in 1997, an appellation for Domfront with 30% pears was created.

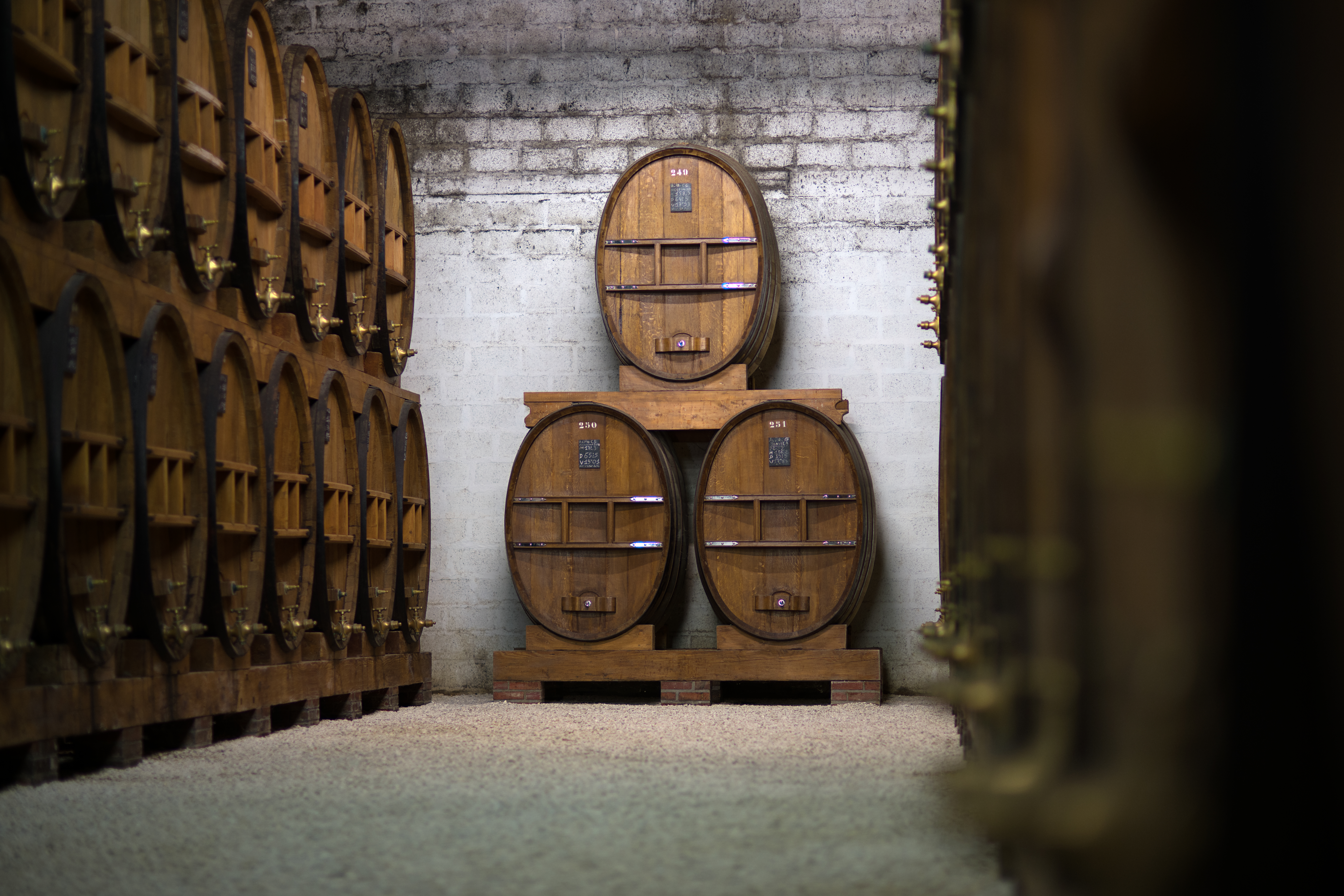
Barrels in a Calvados cellar

=== Elsewhere ===
Cider brandy is also made in the UK, and appears in records going back to 1678. Somerset cider brandy gained protected status in the EU in 2012 and is registered in the United Kingdom under the UK GI scheme (UK-scheme registration dated 31 December 2020).

== Production ==
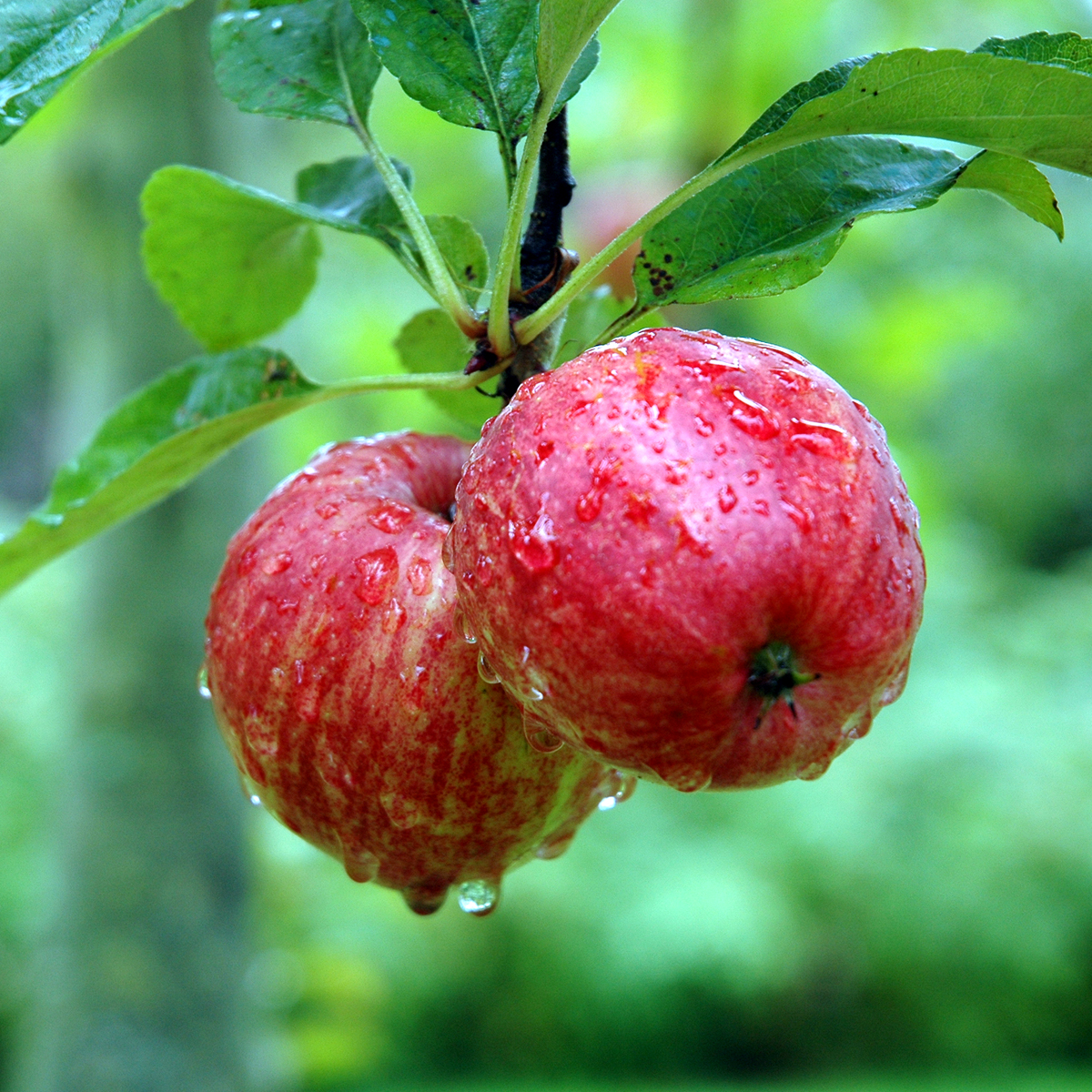
Calvados apples.

Calvados is distilled from cider made from specially grown and selected apples, from over 200 named varieties. It is not uncommon for a calvados producer to use over 100 specific varieties of apples which are either sweet (such as the 'Rouge Duret' variety), tart (such as the 'Rambault' variety), or bitter (such as the 'Mettais', 'Saint Martin', 'Frequin', and 'Binet Rouge' varieties), the latter being inedible. The AOC cahier des charges sets detailed orchard and raw-material rules for production (including categories of cider fruit and planting/management requirements)

The fruit is harvested and pressed into juice, which is fermented into a dry cider. It is then distilled into eau de vie. After two or three years of aging in oak casks, it can be sold as calvados. The longer it is aged, the smoother the drink becomes. Usually, maturation takes several years.

== Double and single distillation ==
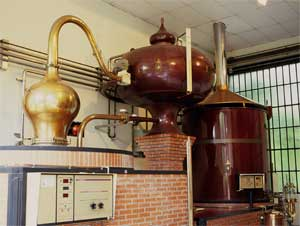
Calvados pot still

The appellation of AOC (appellation d'origine contrôlée) for calvados authorises double distillation for all calvados, but it is required for the Calvados Pays d'Auge.

- Double distillation carried out in a traditional pot still, called either l'alambic à repasse or charentais
- Single continuous distillation in a column still

Column distillation can run continuously and tends to produce a purer spirit, while pot-still distillation is batch-based and often yields a heavier, more characterful spirit profile.

== Producing regions and legal definitions ==
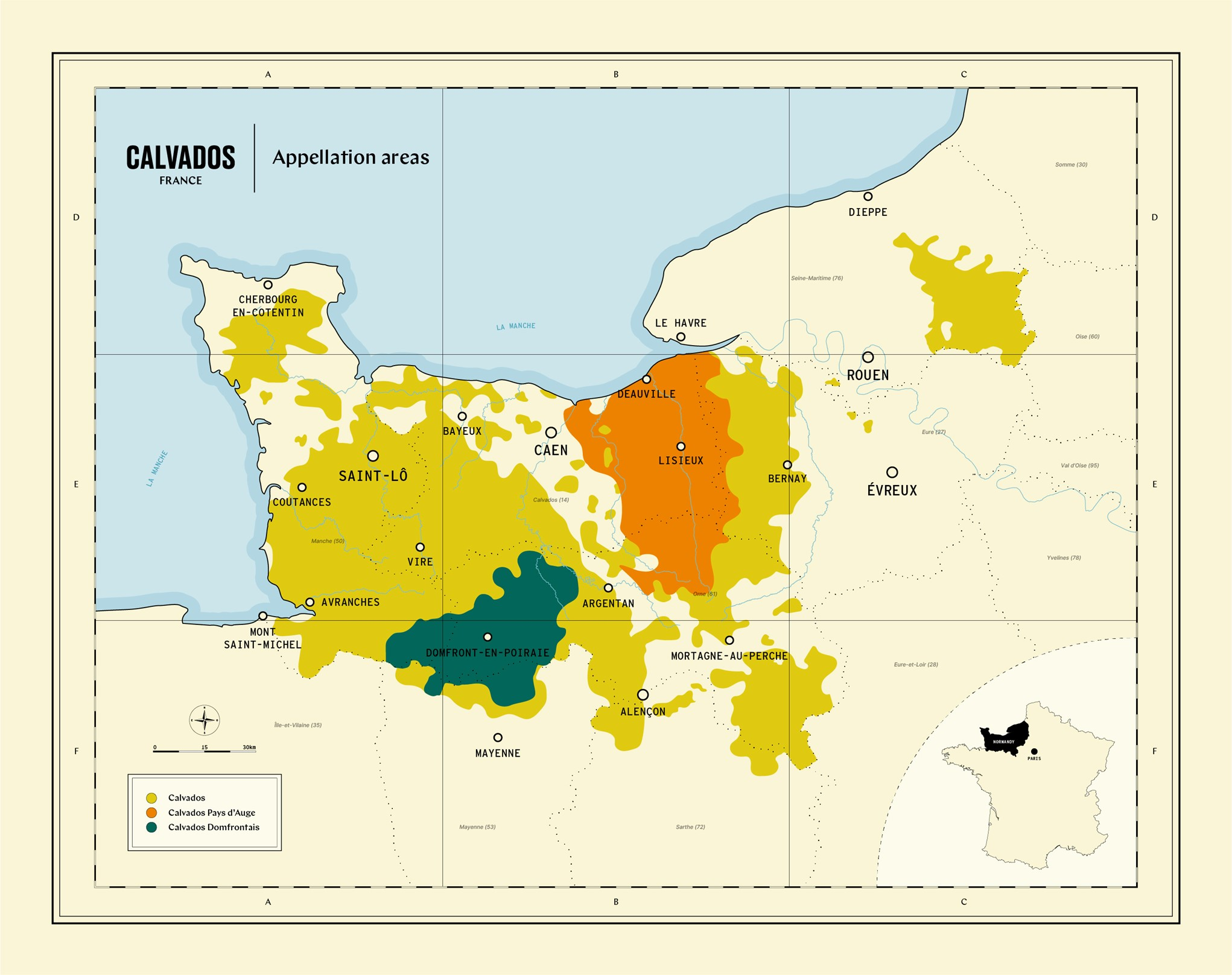
Map of Calvados appellation areas

Like many French wines, calvados is governed by appellation contrôlée regulations. The three appellations for calvados are:

- The AOC calvados area includes all of the Calvados, Manche, and Orne departments and parts of Eure, Mayenne, Sarthe, and Eure-et-Loir.
  - AOC Calvados accounts for over 70% of total production.
  - A minimum of two years of aging in oak barrels is required.
  - The terroir, geographical area, is defined.
  - The apples and pears are defined cider varieties.
  - The procedures in production, such as pressing, fermentation, distillation, and aging, are regulated.
  - Usually, single-column distillation is used.
- The more restrictive AOC calvados Pays d'Auge area is limited to the east end of the department of Calvados and a few adjoining districts.
  - Extensive quality control, the basic rules for AOC calvados together with several additional requirements, is practiced.
  - Aging for a minimum of two years in oak barrels is required.
  - Double distillation in an alembic pot still is used.
  - It must be produced within the designated area in Pays d'Auge.
  - A minimum of six weeks of fermentation is required for the cider.
  - Flavor elements are controlled.
- AOC calvados Domfrontais reflects the long tradition of pear orchards in the area, resulting in a unique fruity calvados. The regulation is similar to the AOC calvados, and the column is still used.
  - A minimum of 30% pears from the designated areas is used.
  - A minimum of three years of aging in oak barrels is required.
  - The orchards must consist of at least 15% pear trees (25% from the 16th harvest).
- Fermier calvados ("farm-made") – some quality-minded producers both inside and outside the Pays d'Auge make "fermier calvados", which indicates the calvados is entirely made on the farm in a traditional agricultural way according to high-quality demands.
- The current product specifications (cahiers des charges) for the three Calvados AOCs were homologated by ministerial arrêtés published in the Journal officiel on 23 December 2021.

== Grades of quality ==
The age on the bottle refers to the age of the youngest constituent of the blend. A blend is often composed of old and young calvados. Producers can also use the terms below to refer to the age.

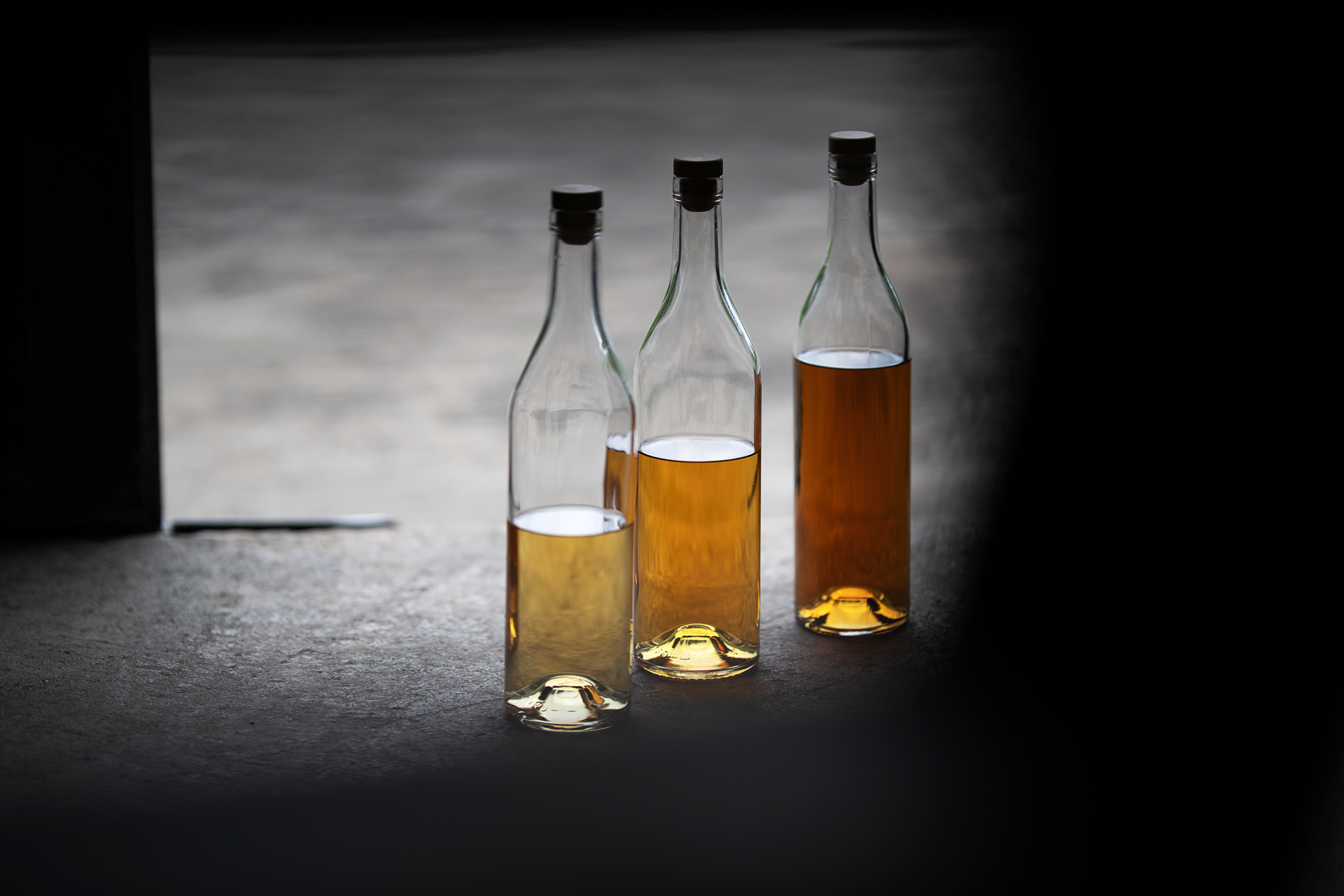
Color and aging of calvados

- "VS", Trois étoiles ***, and Trois pommes must be at least two years old.
- Vieux or Réserve must be at least three years old.
- "V.O.", "VO", Vieille Réserve, "V.S.O.P.", or "VSOP" must be at least four years old.
- "Extra", "X.O.", "XO", "Napoléon", Hors d'Age, Très Vieille Réserve must be at least six years old, but are often sold much older.

High-quality calvados usually has components that are much older than those mentioned. Calvados can be made from a single (generally exceptional) year. When this happens, the label often carries that year.

== Sales and export ==
According to the Interprofession des Appellations Cidricoles (IDAC), 4,608,513 bottles were sold in 2024 by the 300 operators across the three Calvados AOCs, with 47% of sales directed towards export.

== Tasting ==
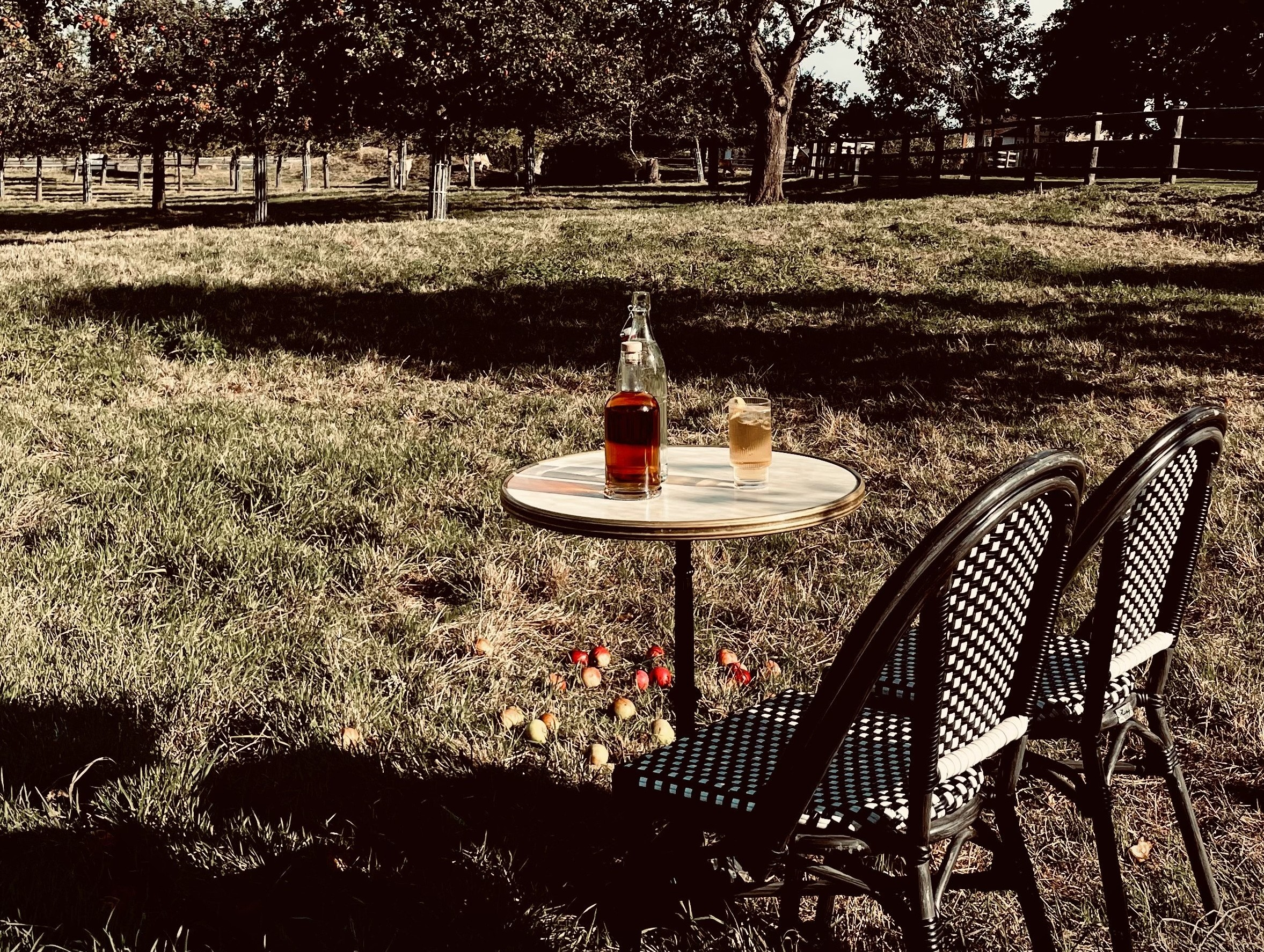
Cocktail Calvados + lemonade

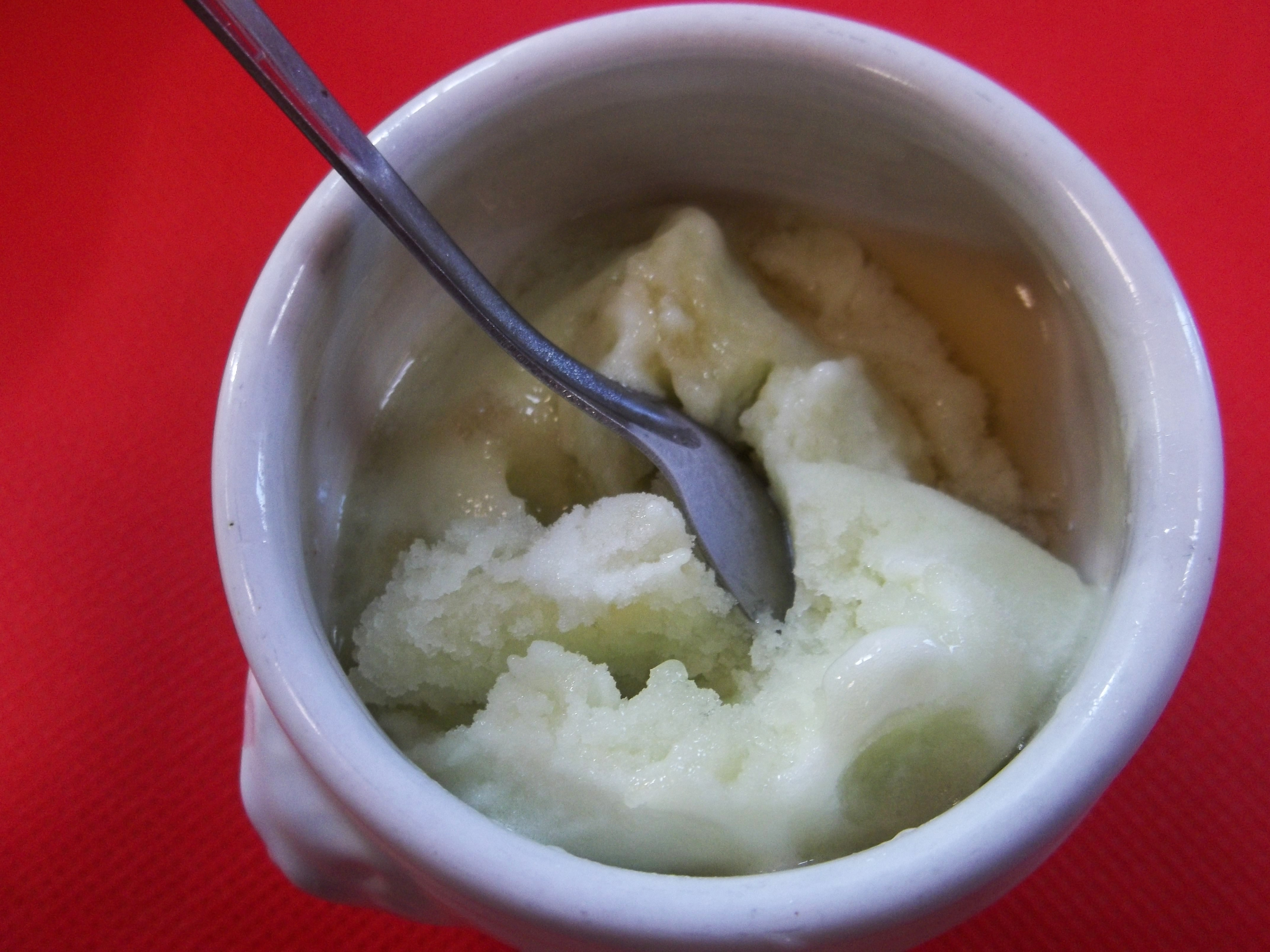
Trou normand, or "Norman Hole", a French mixture of green apple and calvados served as an aperitif/palate cleanser

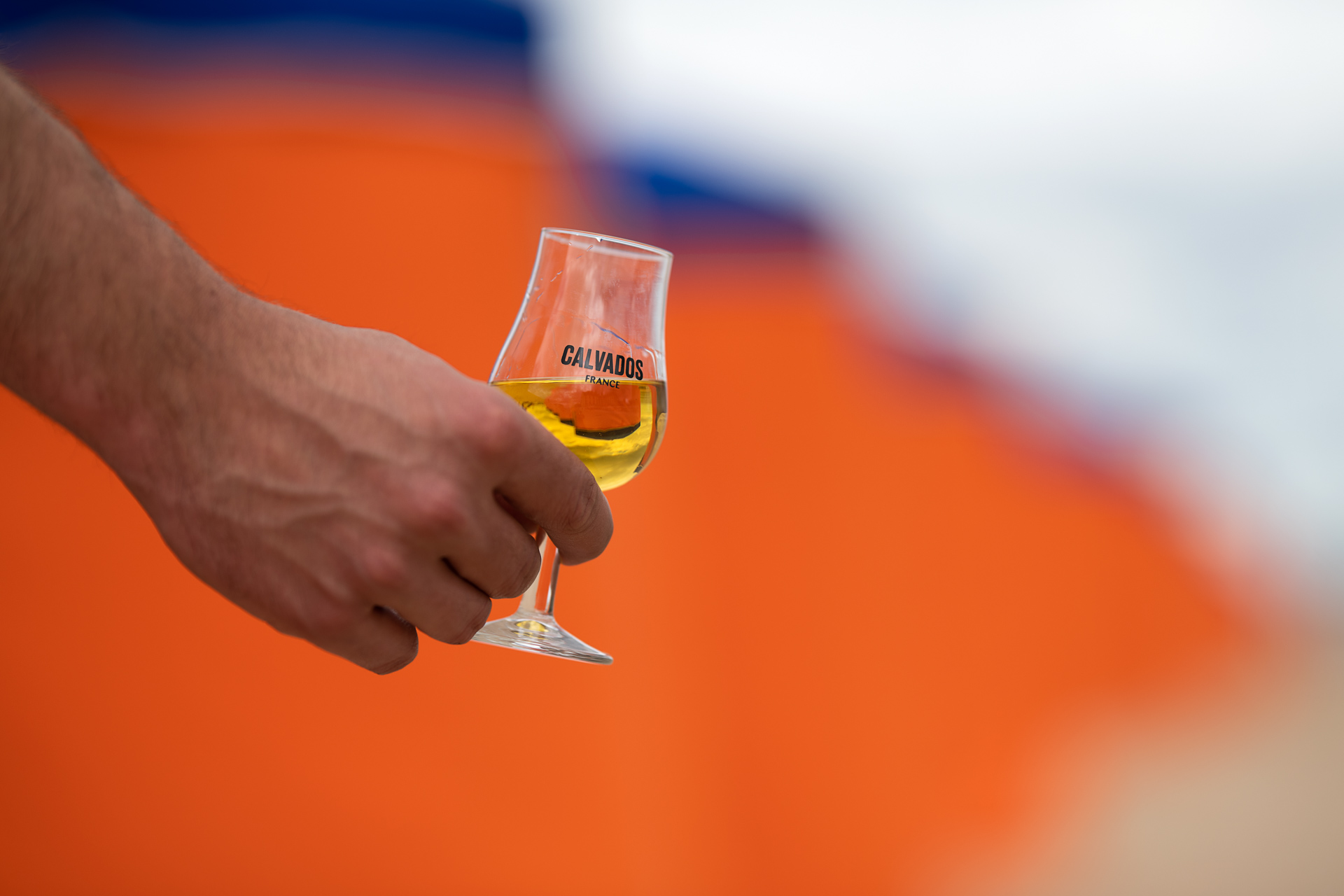
Calvados France glass

Historically, it was largely served as a digestif, but its use in cocktails or as an aperitif has become increasingly popular, much like whisky. Older eaux-de-vie are generally served neat in a small tulip glass to reveal their woody, caramelized aromas and long finish. Calvados can also be enjoyed on the rocks, as the ice softens its intensity and provides a refreshing alternative. In gastronomy, Calvados pairs well with both savory and sweet dishes. It complements foie gras, creamy cheeses such as Camembert de Normandie, roasted poultry, pork dishes with apples, smoked fish, and certain seafoods. On the dessert side, it enhances tarte Tatin, caramel-based pastries, and chocolate or fruit desserts. Younger Calvados (VS or VSOP) have been widely used in mixology since the late 19th century, as historical references already mention apple-based preparations, and they remain appreciated by contemporary bartenders for their balance of freshness, fruitiness, and body. They lend themselves equally well to simple cocktails served on ice or lengthened (such as Calvados tonic or Calvados lemonade) as to more elaborate creations imagined by bartenders. Norman culture is deeply influenced by Calvados, as shown by traditions such as the trou normand, the custom of drinking a small glass of Calvados between main courses during festive meals, and the classic café-calva served in local cafés. The canard is a sugar cube dipped in a small amount of Calvados, traditionally enjoyed by adults but also by children in the countryside.

== In the Canadian Forces ==
Calvados is the regimental drink of The Queen's Own Rifles of Canada, The Royal Regina Rifles, The Royal Canadian Hussars, Le Régiment de Hull, Le Régiment de Maisonneuve, The Sherbrooke Hussars, and The Stormont, Dundas and Glengarry Highlanders. The troops were given Calvados as the units passed through Normandy following the D-Day invasion. Known as le trou normand, it is typically served between courses at a regimental dinner or during a toast in memory of fallen soldiers.

== See also ==
- Angel face, a cocktail involving calvados
- Lambig, a similar drink from Brittany
- Somerset cider brandy, a similar English drink
- Applejack (beverage), a similar American drink
