= Thunderbird (wine) =

Fortified wine brand

- Type: Flavored fortified wine
- Manufacturer: E. & J. Gallo Winery
- Distributor: E. & J. Gallo Winery
- Origin: United States
- Introduced: 1957
- Alcohol by volume: 17.5
- Proof (US): 35
- Colour: Yellow
- Flavour: Citrus

Thunderbird was a discount, flavored fortified wine marketed by E. & J. Gallo Winery in the United States. The wine was originally sold at 20% ABV, later changed to 17.5% ABV.

== History ==
In the 1940s, Ernest Gallo wanted to expand his wine-making business by marketing to groups he felt were underserved but potentially lucrative. After several new products failed on the market, including a beverage marketed towards women called Gallo-ette and a low-alcohol apple wine called Scotty, he found success with Thunderbird, which was targeted to the African-American community.

A change in federal law during 1955 allowed wine to be modified with flavoring agents without resulting in a higher tax, which previously would have impacted the final price of the product. A Los Angeles Gallo salesman noticed liquor store cashiers kept a bottle of concentrated lemon juice behind the counter and would add this to bottles of white port wine upon the request of the African-American purchaser. Upon learning this, Gallo instructed his staff to develop a wine beverage which resulted in Thunderbird, a sweetened, fortified lemon-flavored port wine. This product was very successful, and sold 32 million gallons in 1957, its first year of production enabling Gallo to reposition from third place to first place in the California wine market and eventually become the top winemaker in the US.

Gallo employed celebrity actors James Mason, Tab Hunter, and Cesar Romero to help market the wine on television. Thunderbird is frequently mentioned in songs.

An early radio jingle, which followed a blues theme, contained the lyrics: What's the word? Thunderbird! / How's it sold? Good and cold. / What's the jive? Bird's alive! / What's the price? Thirty twice.. Inflation later necessitated an update to the last line to "a dollar twice"

As of 2018, the original wine was discontinued and the Thunderbird name and logo repurposed for a new range of traditional wines in black bottles.

== See also ==
- Fortified wine
- Night Train (wine)
