= 2010 in American television =

American television in 2010 was a year marked by the usual debuts, cancellations, and continuations of shows; the launches, closures, or rebrandings of channels; but also significant cable/satellite carriage disputes.

== Events ==
=== January ===
Date	Event
1	WPGA-TV/Macon, Georgia, drops its ABC affiliation to become independent. WGXA, the Fox affiliate in Macon, adds ABC to its digital subchannel, reuniting the station with the network it was previously affiliated with.
1	Unable to reach a deal with Scripps Networks Interactive concerning retransmission fees, Cablevision temporarily drops Scripps-owned HGTV and the Food Network from its lineup. The dispute is resolved on January 21.
2	Time Warner Cable and News Corporation sign a new retransmission deal, thus averting what would have been a blackout of the Fox broadcast network and several cable networks on Time Warner Cable systems.
4	Bret Hart makes an appearance on WWE Raw, marking the first time that Hart appeared live on WWE television programming since the Survivor Series and the controversial "Montreal Screwjob" on November 9, 1997.
6	David Hasselhoff announces that he will not return as a judge for America's Got Talent due to pursuing other projects.
7	Sinclair Broadcast Group reaches a one-year retransmission agreement with Mediacom.
7	Reports surface that NBC may move Jay Leno back into the 11:35 p.m. ET/PT slot and move Conan O'Brien's Tonight Show back to 12:05 am (ET/PT); an NBC representative later confirms that Leno's primetime show will end in February. NBC's plan displeases O'Brien, who in a January 12 "People of Earth" statement states his refusal to do The Tonight Show at any other time slot other than its traditional 11:35PM time. Thus begins a bitter divorce between O'Brien and NBC that would result in a $45 million exit deal from NBC for O'Brien—but not before the controversy becomes a media cause célèbre, with O'Brien gaining sympathy from fellow talk hosts and the general public and NBC receiving a public relations black eye.
7	Top-ranked Alabama defeats second-ranked Texas, 37–21, in college football's 2010 BCS National Championship Game. It is the last BCS game to air on broadcast television (on ABC), with cable network ESPN taking over coverage of the entire BCS the following season. (Fox's relationship with the BCS ended on January 5 with its broadcast of the Orange Bowl.)
10	Fox's animated sitcom The Simpsons celebrates 20 years on the air as a weekly television series with the episode "Once Upon a Time in Springfield" (Anne Hathaway, Jackie Mason and Eartha Kitt are guest voices). A one-hour 20th anniversary special, hosted by Morgan Spurlock, follows the episode.
10	Howie Mandel is announced as the new judge for America's Got Talent.
11	Fox announces that Simon Cowell will depart from American Idol in May in order to launch an American version of The X Factor in Fall 2011.
18	The iCarly special, "iSaved Your Life", premieres on Nickelodeon. This special broke the record as the highest-rated premiere in Nickelodeon history, surpassing the series premiere of All Grown Up! from 2003.
20	The FCC votes to close the terrestrial loophole that keeps fiber delivered regional sports networks such as Comcast SportsNet Philadelphia, 4SD, Cox Sports Television, Time Warner Cable SportsNet, and Comcast/Charter Sports Southeast off of satellite systems. Comcast files an appeal the next day.
21	Steve Harvey is announced as the sixth host of Family Feud, replacing John O'Hurley, a role that he holds to this day, and would result in a significant ratings boost.
22	Hope for Haiti Now: A Global Benefit for Earthquake Relief, an international telethon to provide relief for survivors of the 2010 Haiti earthquake, airs live on all major United States broadcast networks, many cable channels, and many other television channels across the world.
22	Conan O'Brien's 7 1/2-month, 146-episode run as host of The Tonight Show comes to an end (and with it his 20+ year relationship with NBC). Tom Hanks and Neil Young are his final guests; Steve Carell makes a surprise appearance, conducting an "exit interview" with O'Brien; and Beck, Ben Harper, Billy Gibbons, and Will Ferrell perform "Free Bird" with O'Brien and The Tonight Show Band in the closing segment.
26	Competitors DirecTV and Dish Network team up to file a lawsuit in Massachusetts alleging discrimination in reaction to the state's new 5% satellite TV tax.
28	Samantha Harris announces that she will not return as the co-host of Dancing with the Stars in order to focus on other projects like her correspondent duties at The Insider and Entertainment Tonight.
31	In what can be described as rarity for having a person who works for one network appearing on a competitor, Fox News Channel president Roger Ailes is among the guest panelists on ABC's This Week; in a roundtable discussion, Ailes defends his network's reputation from the other panelists.

=== February ===
Date	Event
3	LeSEA announces the sale of KWHD/Denver to Liberman Broadcasting; the station will switch to Liberman's Estrella TV network after the sale is completed.
3	The ABC soap All My Children begins airing in high definition as its moves production from New York to Los Angeles.
4	Comcast rebrands their large-market triple play offerings under the Xfinity name.
7	106.5 million people watch the New Orleans Saints defeat the Indianapolis Colts, 31–17, to win Super Bowl XLIV. Nielsen Media Research calls CBS's broadcast of the game the most watched telecast in history, beating 1983's M*A*S*H series finale (which also aired on CBS).
8	After 28 1/2 years and a shift from music to reality programming, MTV drops the "Music Television" moniker from its logo.
9	DirecTV drops the Sirius XM Radio music channels and replaces them with DMX's Sonic Tap channels.
9	After 5 1/2 months in primetime, The Jay Leno Show has its finale on NBC, with guests Ashton Kutcher, Gabourey Sidibe and Bob Costas, plus appearances by Kurt Warner and Donald Trump.
12–28	The 2010 Winter Olympics air from Vancouver, British Columbia on NBC and its family of networks. The remake of the 1985 song "We Are the World" for victims of the 2010 Haiti earthquake debuts as part of NBC's ceremonies broadcast the games are marred by tragedy when Georgian luger Nodar Kumaritashvili is killed in a training run on the night of the opening ceremonies. On its final day, Canada's 3–2 overtime win against the United States for the gold medal in men's hockey is seen by over 27 million viewers stateside, the best ratings for a hockey game since the 1980 Winter Olympics. Sidney Crosby who won the Stanley Cup in 2009 with the Pittsburgh Penguins scores the medal winning goal.
12	DirecTV sues competitor Dish Network for false advertising over TV ads which claim Dish Network has the same channels but for a much lower price. Dish Network denies all claims and counter-sues on February 16. DirecTV drops its lawsuit on April 14.
23	WWE replaces its show ECW with NXT on Syfy.

=== March ===
Date	Event
1	After securing rights formerly held by Setanta Sports USA, Fox Soccer Channel launches premium companion channel Fox Soccer Plus. As a result, Setanta Sports USA is shuttered.
1	Nine months after ceding his host chair to Conan O'Brien and heading to prime-time, Jay Leno returns as host of The Tonight Show. Leno's first guests back are Jamie Foxx, Lindsey Vonn, and musical guest Brad Paisley. Betty White also makes a cameo appearance.
2	Roger Ebert is interviewed on The Oprah Winfrey Show, his first televised appearance since losing his ability to speak due to complications from a 2006 surgery for thyroid cancer.
8	ABC announces that Brooke Burke will be the new co-host of Dancing with the Stars beginning in the Spring 2010 season.
15	After 6 1/2 months of negotiations and attacks, Versus and DirecTV resolve their carriage dispute and the channel is returned to the satellite provider's service—on the same package it was before the dispute began.
22	Monty Hall, the original and most well-known host of Let's Make a Deal, returns to the CBS game show for a full week.
22	Dish Network sues DirecTV for false advertising for a series of ads themed around the classic game show To Tell the Truth comparing Dish Network and the cable television industry as 'impostors'.
24	Cablevision partners with former sister network MSG Network to create "MSG 3D," the first dedicated 3D television network, airing a hockey game between the New York Rangers and New York Islanders. Cablevision continues to operate the channel as a special event channel, airing portions of the 2010 Masters Tournament under the name "iO TV 1300" and a New York Yankees game in conjunction with rival YES Network.
29	Fox Reality Channel ceases to exist and is converted into Nat Geo Wild. Some providers such as DirecTV and Mediacom, who failed to reach a carriage deal for Nat Geo Wild, continue to broadcast Fox Reality until Fox shutters the channel completely on June 30.

=== April ===
Date	Event
4	ESPN360, an ESPN Internet site that streams live sporting events, is rebranded as ESPN3.
5	Galaxy 15, a TV communications satellite operated by Intelsat, is reportedly drifting out of control thousands of miles above the Earth. The satellite, which transmits programming feeds from MTV Networks, Lifetime Entertainment Services, Univision, Hallmark, Showtime, C-SPAN and A&E, threatens to wander into another satellite's orbit and interfere with cable programming across the United States.
8	ESPN's first round coverage of the 2010 Masters Tournament becomes the most-watched golf telecast in cable history, as 4.9 million people tune in to see Tiger Woods' first golf outing since his highly publicized scandal.
12	After months of speculation about Conan O'Brien's future in television following his controversial exit from NBC, TBS announces that O'Brien will host a new show to air Monday-thru-Thursdays at 11 pm ET beginning in November. Lopez Tonight, which had been airing in that time slot, will move to midnight.
12	Kevin Eubanks, bandleader for Jay Leno's Tonight Show and prime-time series, announces his departure after 18 years with Leno.
13	LIN TV Corporation re-brands itself LIN Media in an effort to emphasize its internet and mobile interests (although the corporate name remains LIN TV Corporation).
14	Comedy Central airs the 200th episode of South Park, with many of the celebrities the series has previously mocked banding together to sue the town. After the broadcast, Islamic website Revolution Muslim posts a warning to co-creators Trey Parker and Matt Stone, stating they could face serious repercussions for their depictions of the Islamic prophet, Muhammad. The follow-up to the episode, "201", is heavily censored and airs only once, with the network disallowing streaming of the original, unedited version on the Internet. Authorities later investigate whether there is a connection between South Park and the Times Square car bomb attempt, which was discovered near Comedy Central parent Viacom's headquarters at One Astor Plaza in New York City on May 1.
15	Executives at Fox News Channel cancel a taped broadcast of Hannity from Cincinnati, Ohio after it was discovered that the event's organizers, the Cincinnati Tea Party, were billing host Sean Hannity as a centerpiece of the event and charging admission to the taping.
17	Matt Smith's U.S. debut as the Eleventh Doctor on the long-running British series Doctor Who pulls in the highest ratings in BBC America's history (with 1.2 million viewers).
22	Entering into a joint bid with Turner Sports, CBS is granted the rights to continue broadcasting the NCAA Division I men's basketball tournament, which it has done since 1982. From 2011 to 2015, CBS and Turner will split coverage of early rounds through the Sweet Sixteen, with CBS carrying the regional finals, Final Four and national championship. Turner will then pick up the later rounds on an alternating basis beginning in 2016. Turner's coverage will air on TBS, TNT, and truTV.
22	The NFL draft, starting in prime time for the first time ever, sets a record for number of viewers (8.3 million total between NFL Network and ESPN, 7.29 million on the latter network alone).
30	PBS Kids stops broadcasting It's a Big Big World.

=== May ===
Date	Event
2	Conan O'Brien makes his first TV appearance since his Tonight Show finale, sitting down with Steve Kroft for an interview on CBS's 60 Minutes to discuss the Tonight Show controversy and its aftermath.
4	London Broadcasting Company announces a deal to acquire KIII/Corpus Christi from McKinnon Broadcasting Company for $10 million.
8	Thanks to a successful campaign by her fans on Facebook, Betty White hosts Saturday Night Live on NBC, a show that features a Mother's Day weekend appearance by former SNL cast members Tina Fey, Amy Poehler, Molly Shannon, Maya Rudolph, Ana Gasteyer and Rachel Dratch. White's performance gains critical acclaim, and she earns an Emmy Award in August for Guest Actress in a Comedy Series, the 7th Emmy of her career.
9	NBC affiliate KTEN in Ada, Oklahoma, switches its DT3 subchannel from local weather radar to ABC, giving the Sherman-Ada market its first full-time ABC affiliate. This in turn gives the area in-market affiliates of all four major commercial networks, as rival KXII is affiliated with CBS and Fox.
10	Barbara Walters announces on The View that she will take a leave of absence from the ABC show to undergo surgery to repair a faulty heart valve.
12	Haim Saban's Saban Brands purchases the Power Rangers franchise back from Disney; the company plans to air a new 19th season of Power Rangers on Nickelodeon in Spring 2011, with the previous 700 episodes also being rerun on that network.
13	Former Food Network celebrity Juan-Carlos Cruz is arrested in Santa Monica, California, for attempting to recruit homeless people to perform a murder-for-hire plot. Cruz pleads "no contest" in November to a charge of soliciting murder, and is sentenced to a 9-year prison term the following month.
14	NBC confirms it has canceled Law & Order. Series executive producer Dick Wolf reportedly considers moving the police-and-legal drama to TNT, where it has aired in reruns for several years. (AMC considers making an offer as well). No network offers a move, however, and the series leaves the air on May 24 tied with Gunsmoke as the longest-running (20 seasons) prime time drama on American television.
14	After a single season, Fox cancels The Wanda Sykes Show, its most recent attempt at original late-night programming on Saturdays (a time slot that previously aired MADtv and Talkshow with Spike Feresten). Since November 2010, reruns of current and older Fox shows (e.g. Terra Nova, New Girl) have occupied the time slot, though Fox later makes plans to launch new animated programming in the slot in 2013.
15	ABC affiliate KTVO in Kirksville, Missouri, launches a DT2 subchannel affiliated with CBS, giving the Kirksville-Ottumwa market its first full-time CBS affiliate.
16	In CBS, law firm and winner of the seventh season of Survivor Sandra Diaz-Twine, who later proclaimed her as "Queen of Survivor", became the first two-time sole survivor after the conclusion of the recent season of Survivor; former winner from the sixteenth season Parvati Shallow finished as runner-up, marking the first time in the show's history former winners finished in the top two of the final three.
18	CNN prime time host Campbell Brown announces she is leaving the channel, citing difficulty in competing with Fox News' Bill O'Reilly and MSNBC's Keith Olbermann as her main reason as well as a desire to spend more time with her family.
20	The Parents Television Council announces that it plans to target CBS and its affiliates after the network's addition of the sitcom $#*! My Dad Says to its 2010–2011 fall TV lineup, with the PTC citing both the show's vulgar title and its Thursday night 8:30PM timeslot as reasons. The show is cancelled after one season.
21	In a dispute over carriage fees and allegations of the network's gravitation from information to entertainment-based programming, Dish Network drops The Weather Channel and replaces it with its own channel, "The Weather Cast." The dispute is resolved 3 days later as Dish restores The Weather Channel and shutters The Weather Cast, making it the shortest-lived cable/satellite channel in history.
22	Fuse TV airs Gulf Aid: Concert For The Coast a benefit concert in response to the Deepwater Horizon oil spill.
23	Daystar launches the digital signals of the remaining stations it purchased from Equity Media Holdings, which had been caught in limbo due to Equity's bankruptcy and the digital transition. The sign-ons come just three weeks before the stations' licenses would have automatically been forfeited back to the FCC.
26	Disney/ABC announces plans to shut down SoapNet in 2012 and replace it with a channel aimed at pre-schoolers named Disney Junior.
29	Cartoon Network rebrands with a new logo and look also holding a new slogan CHECK it.
31	Fine Living Network is shut down, relaunched and rebranded as Cooking Channel, an instructional counterpart to Food Network.

=== June ===
Date	Event
2	The New York Post reports that General Electric has finalized an exit deal for Jeff Zucker, president and CEO of NBCUniversal, worth between $30 million and $40 million. The exit would take place shortly after Comcast takes over as the new owner of the company.
4	WLGA/Columbus, GA ceases operations as an Independent station. The station will return to the air in the summer of 2012.
11	ESPN launches ESPN 3D, the country's first nationwide 3DTV channel, to coincide with the start of the 2010 FIFA World Cup.
14	Cablevision buys out Bresnan Communications for $1.365 billion.
15	Local TV buys Portsmouth, Virginia, station WGNT from CBS Corporation for $16.5 million, pending FCC approval. Until the sale closes, Local TV will operate WGNT through a local marketing agreement before they move the studios to Local's CBS affiliate in the Hampton Roads market, WTKR.
16	The premiere of the TV Land series Hot in Cleveland draws 4.75 million viewers, making it the most watched program in the network's 14-year history.
17	28.2 million people watch the seventh and deciding game of the 2010 NBA Finals on ABC, in which the Los Angeles Lakers defeat the Boston Celtics to win the NBA Championship; it is the most watched NBA telecast since 1998.
22	Dish Network removes the HD feeds of Disney Channel, Disney XD, ABC Family, and ESPNews due to a carriage dispute that continues to this day.
22	CNN announces the 8 pm ET time slot Campbell Brown is vacating will be filled by a talk show hosted by Eliot Spitzer and Kathleen Parker.
24	Happening Now co-anchor Jane Skinner leaves Fox News Channel to spend more time with her family.
28	Steve Carell confirms he will leave The Office, where he portrays Michael Scott, at the end of the 2010–11 season.
28	Disney Channel's late night block of Disney animation is discontinued.
29	Larry King announces he will end his long-running CNN program Larry King Live in the fall.

=== July ===
Date	Event
1	DirecTV and Panasonic launch n3D, the world's first 24-hour 3DTV channel.
7	Due to poor sales and possibly a decline in ratings and interest in American Idol's 9th season, the accompanying "American Idols LIVE! Tour 2010" cancels eight of its 38 shows.
7	Jenna Lee from Fox Business Network is named as the new co-anchor of Happening Now, beginning July 12.
8	NBA player LeBron James buys an hour of airtime on ESPN to announce he will sign with the Miami Heat via free agency instead of staying with the Cleveland Cavaliers. The advertising proceeds from the special, titled The Decision, go to the Boys & Girls Clubs of America.
9	A profanity-laced video parody involving the news department at NBC affiliate KARK-TV in Little Rock, Arkansas, that later surfaces on YouTube leads to station management dismissing four employees involved in the stunt.
10	Dish Network/EchoStar launches its newest satellite, EchoStar XV.
11	The final match of the 2010 FIFA World Cup, in which Spain defeats the Netherlands, becomes the most watched soccer match in American television history, with 24.3 million people tuning into ABC and Univision to watch the final.
12	MTV Tr3́s drops the "MTV" from its name and simply becomes Tr3́s, with a new slogan "MTV: Musica y Mas" (Spanish for MTV: Music and More).
12	With over 7.5 million viewers, the premiere of the TNT drama Rizzoli & Isles sets a record as the highest-rated debut for a commercial-supported cable series; it is also the second-highest debut ever for a basic cable TV series.
13	ABC affiliate WABG-TV in Greenwood, Mississippi, announces plans to sign-on the Greenville-Greenwood market's first locally based NBC affiliate on WNBD-LD, thus giving the area in-market affiliates of all four major commercial networks. The new station will sign-on exactly five months later, on December 13.
15	AT&T Uverse and Rainbow Media reach a new carriage deal, resolving a dispute that would have kept WE tv, AMC, Sundance Channel and IFC from being on the IPTV provider.
16	Rich Fields announced on his website that he had been let go as announcer of The Price Is Right, as producers look to change certain aspects of the game show, including adding performances by live bands and putting a comedian at the podium Fields occupied for six years. Fields is the only announcer in the history of the long running CBS game show to leave without dying. Fields however, would be one of the group of guest announcers on Wheel of Fortune in November following the death of longtime wheel announcer Charlie O'Donnell.
27	Residents in the state of Hawaii lose cable, television, telephone and Internet service from Oceanic Time Warner Cable for nearly two hours after its fiber optic cable system, located 3,000 feet deep in the Molokai Channel, is severely damaged. The hardest hit areas are the island counties of Maui and Hawaii (The Big Island). A new fiber optic cable system is expected to be in place within three to five weeks.
29	American President Barack Obama pays a visit to The View, making him the first sitting president to appear on a daytime talk show.
30	PBS Kids stops broadcasting the Emmy Award Winning cartoon Cyberchase due to a hiatus that is until 2013 though it still airs on most PBS stations like KLCS in Los Angeles and WNET in New York City.
30	Ellen DeGeneres announces that she will leave as American Idol judge after one season, saying in a statement that the series "didn't feel like the right fit for me". This is followed by the announcement that Kara DioGuardi had been fired from her role as a judge after two seasons on the show.
31	Baylor University-owned PBS outlet KWBU-TV/Waco, Texas, signs off the air after 21 years due to the university's budgetary concerns.

=== August ===
Date	Event
1	HSN launches a companion channel, HSN2.
1	Producers of ABC's Detroit 1-8-7 announce a change to the format from mockumentary to crime drama, in response to an incident in May in which a 7-year-old Detroit girl was accidentally killed by police during the taping of an episode of A&E's The First 48.
3	Comcast announces the formation of its newest regional sports network, Comcast SportsNet Houston, which will become the exclusive home of the NBA's Houston Rockets starting in the 2012–13 NBA season and the MLB's Houston Astros starting in the 2013 MLB season.
5	After 30 years as co-host, Mary Hart announces her exit from Entertainment Tonight, effective in 2011.
7	The CW4Kids ends on The CW. The following week, the block is replaced with Toonzai.
10	Just two weeks after it was reported that she would be joining American Idol, Jennifer Lopez turns down the offer amid reports that she and Idol producers could not come to terms that Lopez wanted to add to her contract.
11	After 63 years as a reporter and anchorman at KTLA/Los Angeles (ever since its sign-on in 1947), Stan Chambers officially announces his retirement.
16	HBO reverses a plan to cancel The Life & Times of Tim, which they announced 2 months earlier.
29	At the 62nd Primetime Emmy Awards, Mad Men wins Outstanding Drama Series, Temple Grandin nabs the Outstanding Television Movie category and Modern Family is awarded Outstanding Comedy Series. The seventh season of Top Chef won the Outstanding Reality-Competition Series with The Amazing Race losing the award for the first time since the category was introduced in 2003. Jimmy Fallon hosts the event on NBC, which broadcasts the event live to all time zones for the first time ever.
30	An affiliation switch takes place in San Antonio, with KMYS joining The CW and KCWX taking My Network TV.

=== September ===
Date	Event
1	AT&T Uverse drops Crown Media Holdings-owned channels Hallmark Channel and Hallmark Movie Channel due to a carriage dispute.
1	James Lee, a gunman and armed bomber, takes the Discovery Communications Building in Silver Spring, Maryland, hostage for several hours. Lee is subsequently confirmed dead by a shot to the head and the hostages are released unharmed.
2	A deal is reached between Time Warner Cable and The Walt Disney Company that prevents Disney networks such as ESPN, Disney Channel, ABC Family, and ABC owned-and-operated stations from being taken off TWC's lineup. The agreement also adds ESPN's 3D channel and Internet streaming of live sporting events.
3	Kara DioGuardi confirms she will not return as American Idol judge.
14	Roger Craig sets a one-day record on Jeopardy! with $77,000. The record was since surpassed by James Holzhauer on April 9 and 17, 2019 with $110,914 and $131,127, respectively.
17	After 54 years on CBS television, As the World Turns, the last of the Procter and Gamble Productions soap operas, airs its final episode.
22	The producers of PBS's Sesame Street pull a taped segment featuring singer Katy Perry performing a modified "kid friendly" version of her song "Hot n Cold" with Elmo after a preview on YouTube draws complaints from parents for Perry's wearing a costume with too much cleavage showing. Later that week, Perry alludes to the incident on Saturday Night Live by wearing a low-cut Elmo T-shirt in a skit.
22	American Idol confirms plans for its 10th season in 2011, including the return of Nigel Lythgoe as executive producer and a 3-judge panel of Randy Jackson, Jennifer Lopez, and Steven Tyler.
23	NBCUniversal CEO Jeff Zucker announces he will depart the company once its purchase by Comcast is completed. He has since been replaced by Comcast COO Stephen Burke.
24	CNN President Jonathan Klein resigns and is replaced by Ken Jautz.
24	The pilot episode of Blue Bloods airs on CBS.
27	Qubo Channel launches a late night programming block named Qubo Night Owl with the debuts of the following Filmation series: He-Man and the Masters of the Universe, She-Ra: Princess of Power, Filmation's Ghostbusters, and BraveStarr.
28	An episode of MTV's Teen Mom, shows participant Amber Portwood repeatedly assaulting her partner Gary Shirley in front of their young child, kicking and punching him and leaving him injured. MTV neither attempted to stop her assaults, nor did they report the crimes to the police. Portwood was later convicted of felony domestic violence charges after viewers reported her assaults to police some weeks later upon the broadcast of the material on television.

=== October ===
Date	Event
1	Sony launches a new movie channel called Sony Movie Channel, its first wholly owned American channel.
1	Fox Sports en Español changes its name to Fox Deportes.
1	Dish Network drops Fox-owned channels FX, National Geographic Channel, and 19 FSN affiliates due to a carriage dispute. Fox Cable Networks also informs Dish Network customers that the contracts for owned and operated Fox and MyNetworkTV broadcast stations, along with Fox affiliates formerly owned by the network and since sold to Local TV LLC expire on November 1.
1	Dish Network drops MSG Media-owned channels MSG Network and MSG Plus due to a carriage dispute that continues to this day.
1	CNN announces it has terminated Rick Sanchez, one day after the anchor made comments on a radio show that referred to Jon Stewart as a "bigot" and suggested that CNN is run by Jewish people.
8	For the first time in its 46 years, PBS affiliate KCET/Los Angeles announces that it will become an independent educational station and drop PBS on December 31, 2010.
10	After 14 years, Discovery Kids rebranded as the Hub Network, a kids and family channel jointly operated by Discovery Communications and Hasbro.
11–15	Wheel of Fortune had a week with the first instance of having a car (Mercedes-Benz C300) played as a prize on all five bonus rounds that week, the first time since the introduction of the Bonus Wheel in 2001.
11	Caitlin Sanchez, the voice of Dora the Explorer, sues Nickelodeon for $7 million in back pay stemming from a contract dispute.
14	A debate about the Ground Zero mosque controversy with Fox News host Bill O'Reilly results in Whoopi Goldberg and Joy Behar storming off the set of The View.
16	Cablevision pulls Fox-owned channels WNYW, WWOR-TV, WTXF-TV, National Geographic Wild, Fox Business Network, and Fox Deportes due to a carriage dispute.
21	NPR fires commentator Juan Williams for saying he gets worried and nervous when he sees people wearing Muslim attire on planes during a segment on Fox News Channel's The O'Reilly Factor the previous day. Williams would later accept a lucrative contract (worth $2 million) to join Fox news full-time.
29	Dish Network and Fox come to terms on a renewal of their carriage agreement for their broadcast stations and cable networks two days before Fox's broadcast stations, along with the formerly Fox-owned affiliates now owned by Local TV LLC were to be removed.
30	Cablevision and Fox come to terms on a new carriage agreement, restoring Fox's networks and cable channels to their systems in New York, Connecticut and New Jersey, although Cablevision calls the cost for the channels "unfair" in their release detailing the new deal under undisclosed terms.
31	Video on Demand service Fearnet launches a linear high definition channel. Currently, no carriage deals have been reached for the channel.

=== November ===
Date	Event
1	After a 21-year run on Univision, Cristina Saralegui's self-titled talk show, El Show de Cristina airs its final episode; though Saralegui was against Univison's cancellation, she continues to work with the network on a number of projects and specials.
1	DirecTV removes G4 due to a carriage dispute. This marks the beginning of a slow decline, which led to G4 discontinuing all operations more than four years later.
1	Dish Network and Belo Corporation come to terms on a new carriage agreement minutes before the Belo-owned stations were to be pulled in a separate carriage dispute.
1	Fox broadcasts Game 5 of the World Series. The San Francisco Giants defeat the Texas Rangers. It was the team's first title since 1954 and first since moving to San Francisco. This marked the end of the Curse of Coogan's Bluff.
4	ABC announces it will sell WTVG/Toledo and WJRT-TV/Flint back to former owner SJL Broadcasting, pending FCC approval.
5	MSNBC suspends Keith Olbermann for donating to three Democratic congressional candidates in the last weeks before the November general election against NBC News policies. Initially an indefinite suspension, MSNBC reinstates Olbermann on November 9, when the host thanks his supporters and viewers but slams MSNBC, claiming that he did not know about their policy against donating money to political candidates or parties.
5	AT&T Uverse removes the suite of Scripps Networks channels, (excluding Travel Channel, which remains under a previous carriage agreement under former owner Discovery Networks) in a carriage dispute. They are restored on November 7, 2010.
5	Caitlin Burke, a woman on Wheel of Fortune, solved the puzzle ("I've Got a Good Feeling About This!") with only the N showing. In the same episode hosts Pat Sajak and Vanna White pay tribute to their announcer Charlie O'Donnell who died earlier in the week on November 1.
7	Jo Frost announces that she is leaving Supernanny to start a family of her own, thus ending the series' run after seven seasons.
8	Conan debuts on TBS, 9 1/2 months after host Conan O'Brien's departure from The Tonight Show. The premiere, which attracts 4.2 million viewers, features guest appearances by Arlene Wagner, Seth Rogen, and Lea Michele; a musical performance from Jack White; pre-taped warm wishes from Ricky Gervais; and a filmed cold-open sketch that features Larry King and Jon Hamm (as his Mad Men character Don Draper).
8	ESPN announces the breakup of its longtime ESPN Sunday Night Baseball announcing team of Jon Miller and Joe Morgan, as Morgan's contract is not renewed and Miller is asked to move to radio broadcasts (Miller declines the move and leaves ESPN entirely).
8	ION Media Networks announces it is acquiring ShopNBC affiliate WQEX/Pittsburgh from WQED Multimedia for $3 million. If the FCC approves, the move will give Pittsburgh its first Ion affiliate (under the new call sign WINP).
10	Oprah Winfrey invites former talk show hosts Phil Donahue, Sally Jessy Raphael, Geraldo Rivera, Ricki Lake and Montel Williams as guests on her show, the first time Winfrey had fellow talk hosts appear together since their programs left the air.
10	Fox Business Network announces ex-CNN anchor Lou Dobbs will join the channel in 2011.
11	After more than 40 years, Gene Shalit leaves NBC's The Today Show.
13	In the wake of Demi Lovato's decision to enter a treatment facility to deal with "emotional and physical issues," The Disney Channel announces that her sitcom Sonny With a Chance will be temporarily revamped, focusing on sketches from the show-within-a-show "So Random," until she returns for the show's third season in January 2011.
15	St. Louis television stations KSDK (NBC affiliate owned by Gannett Company) and KDNL-TV (ABC affiliate owned by Sinclair Broadcast Group) announce that they will start joint-venturing on daily 5 pm and 10 pm newscasts for KDNL beginning January 3, 2011. The move will create the first local newscasts on KDNL since it dropped its own low-rated news in 2001.
16	Former reality TV producer Bruce Beresford-Redman is arrested for the murder of his wife.
17	Freedom Communications puts all of its 10 television stations on the selling block for $500 million.
19	Two weeks after Keith Olbermann's suspension for political donations, MSNBC suspends Morning Joe host Joe Scarborough for making contributions to Florida Republican candidates.
24	Dish Network drops Comcast SportsNet California after losing in FCC arbitration.
30	Susan Boyle abruptly stops her live performance of "O Holy Night" on The View after starting to cough. The singer asks to start over, but the segment ends instead with thanks from hosts Whoopi Goldberg and Sherri Shepherd and Boyle stating that she had a "frog in (her) throat." The performance is rerecorded for the West Coast airing, but the live version makes its rounds through YouTube.
30	The 2010 Victoria's Secret Fashion Show is broadcast on CBS. 10.4 million people tune in.

=== December ===
Date	Event
2	Over 7 million people tune into TNT to watch the Miami Heat defeat the Cleveland Cavaliers in LeBron James' first appearance in Cleveland since controversially leaving the team 5 months earlier; it is the third most-watched NBA regular season telecast on cable since 1996.
5	On Fox, The Simpsons guest stars Katy Perry and Martha Stewart in the episode "The Fight Before Christmas". The episode also has a live action segment featuring characters from the show as puppets that parodied The Muppets and featured Perry as herself.
9	Idaho Falls-Pocatello, Idaho, outlets KIDK (a CBS affiliate owned by Fisher Communications) and KIFI (an ABC affiliate owned by News-Press & Gazette Company) announced a shared-services agreement, which will result in the termination of 27 employees.
15	Weigel Broadcasting's MeTV, which originates from WWME-CD in Chicago, launches nationally to become a full-fledged digital subchannel network with a standardized schedule.
16	CNN's Larry King Live airs its last original episode, with President Barack Obama, former President Bill Clinton, and news anchors Barbara Walters, Diane Sawyer, Katie Couric and Brian Williams among those appearing to wish host Larry King well on his retirement.
17	WSB-TV/Atlanta anchor/reporter John Pruitt anchors the 6 pm newscast for the last time, ending a 46-year run at the station.
20	Salinas/Monterey, California NBC affiliate KSBW announces it will add ABC to KSBW-DT2 in Spring 2011, returning ABC to the market for the first time since San Jose's KNTV became a Bay Area-centric NBC affiliate (now O&O) in 2002, and at last giving Monterey-Salinas in-market affiliates of all four major commercial networks. The deal is officially announced on February 11, 2011, and takes effect on April 18. At that time, KSBW-DT2 rebrands itself as "Central Coast ABC".
20	The premiere of Million Dollar Money Drop, based on the British game show The Million Pound Drop (now called The £100K Drop) which also premiered earlier on May the same year, faced backlash by viewers on an inconsistency on one of the questions ("Which of these was sold in stores first?") and the three possible answers include Macintosh computer, Sony Walkman, and Post-it Notes. Contestants Gabe Okoye and Brittany Mayti wagered and dropped $800,000 on Post-it Notes but the correct answer was revealed as Walkman. News article Gawker posted the controversial moment the day after broadcast leading FOX and the host, Kevin Pollak, to allow the couple to play the game with the question thrown out. The controversy might have also led to the eventual cancellation on May the following year.
21	The studios of ABC affiliate WSOC-TV/Charlotte are shut down for an hour and its 5PM newscast ends early after a woman enters the lobby with a gun and apparently intending to commit suicide. The woman is later apprehended and her gun is discovered to be unloaded.
26	A blizzard in the Philadelphia area postpones an NBC Sunday Night Football game between the Eagles and Minnesota Vikings to Tuesday the 28th, the 2nd postponement of an NFL game this month. (A December 12 Vikings home game with the New York Giants is moved to December 13 and played in Detroit due to damage to the Vikings' home stadium, the Hubert H. Humphrey Metrodome. That game's broadcast was limited to Fox stations in the New York, the Twin Cities, Albany, Mankato, and Rochester markets.)
27	After 2 years, Cartoon Network's Adult Swim block changes its operating hours from 10:00 pm – 6:00 am to 9:00 pm – 6:00 am.
30	Hearst Television reaches a carriage fee agreement with DirecTV, keeping Hearst-owned stations on the satellite provider after December 31.
31	Time Warner Cable and Sinclair Broadcast Group announce a temporary agreement (through January 14, 2011) to keep Sinclair-owned-or-operated stations on Time Warner and Bright House Networks cable systems. The announcement comes during heated negotiations over carriage fees, during which Sinclair threatened to pull its signals on December 31 and Time Warner announced intentions to continue affected network programming through other means if that happened.
31	Dish Network's current deal for E! and Style Network runs out, but a temporary agreement allows the channel to remain on while negotiations continue.
31	On CBS, Harry Smith co-hosted its final episode of The Early Show, after 8 years.

== Television programs ==
=== Debuts ===
Date	Show	Network	Source
January 1	Curb Appeal	HGTV	
January 1	The Outdoor Room	HGTV	
January 1	The Antonio Treatment	HGTV	
January 3	Frank the Entertainer in a Basement Affair	VH1	
January 3	Secrets of Aspen	VH1	
January 3	Worst Cooks in America	Food Network	
January 4	Blood, Sweat and Takeaways	Planet Green	
January 5	Wild Recon	Animal Planet	
January 8	Operation Wild	Planet Green	
January 11	Border Wars	National Geographic	
January 11	Fantasia for Real	VH1	
January 11	Let's Talk About Pep	VH1	
January 12	Blue Mountain State	Spike	
January 13	Solving History with Olly Steeds	Discovery Channel	
January 14	Carnie Wilson: Unstapled	GSN	
January 16	Pit Boss	Animal Planet	
January 17	Human Target	Fox	
January 18	American Pickers	History	
January 18	The Buried Life	MTV	
January 18	My Life as Liz	MTV	
January 18	Life Unexpected	The CW	
January 18	Rick's List	CNN	
January 19	Paranormal Cops	A&E	
January 21	The Deep End	ABC	
January 22	Caprica	Syfy	
January 22	Spartacus	Starz	
January 25	Team Umizoomi	Nickelodeon	
February 1	America Live with Megyn Kelly	Fox News Channel	
February 1	Kell on Earth	Bravo	
February 1	Tinga Tinga Tales	Playhouse Disney	
February 2	The Michael Vick Project	BET	
February 7	Undercover Boss	CBS	
February 8	NFL Full Contact	truTV	
February 10	Inside NASCAR	Showtime	
February 11	Past Life	Fox	
February 11	SciGirls	PBS Kids Go!	
February 13	Kick Buttowski: Suburban Daredevil	Disney XD	
February 14	How to Make It in America	HBO	
February 19	The Ricky Gervais Show	HBO	
February 20	The Robert Verdi Show	Logo	
February 21	The Family Crews	BET	
February 23	WWE NXT	Syfy	
March 1	Hero: 108	Cartoon Network	
March 2	Players	Spike	
March 2	Parenthood	NBC	
March 4	The Marriage Ref	NBC	
March 5	Who Do You Think You Are?	NBC	
March 7	Pink Panther and Pals	Cartoon Network	
March 10	High Society	The CW	
March 14	Minute to Win It	NBC	
March 14	The Pacific	HBO	
March 14	Sons of Tucson	Fox	
March 15	The Price of Beauty	VH1	
March 15	TRANSform Me	VH1	
March 16	Justified	FX	
March 17	Addicted	TLC	
March 17	Unique Autosports: Miami	Spike	
March 17	Ugly Americans	Comedy Central	
March 22	John King, USA	CNN	
March 24	Fly Girls	The CW	
March 27	Victorious	Nickelodeon	
April 2	Miami Medical	CBS	
April 3	Doodlebops Rockin' Road Show	CBS	
April 3	ESPN Sports Saturday	ABC	
April 3	Winners Bracket	ABC	
April 4	Good Luck Charlie	Disney Channel	
April 5	Adventure Time	Cartoon Network	
April 5	Scooby-Doo! Mystery Incorporated	Cartoon Network	
April 6	Paris Hilton's British Best Friend	TVGN	
April 11	Treme	HBO	
April 11	Brandy & Ray J: A Family Business	VH1	
April 11	Basketball Wives	VH1	
April 18	The Emeril Lagasse Show	Ion Television	
April 19	Romantically Challenged	ABC	
April 23	Ben 10: Ultimate Alien	Cartoon Network	
April 23	Generator Rex	Cartoon Network	
April 28	Happy Town	ABC	
May 16	Check It Out! with Dr. Steve Brule	Adult Swim	
May 19	The Good Guys	Fox	
May 27	100 Questions	NBC	
May 29	Mall Cops: Mall of America	TLC	
June 1	Losing It With Jillian	NBC	
June 2	Are We There Yet?	TBS	
June 6	Top Shot	History	
June 7	Neighbors from Hell	TBS	
June 7	Persons Unknown	NBC	
June 8	Pretty Little Liars	ABC Family	
June 10	The Green Room with Paul Provenza	Showtime	
June 10	Late Night Liars	GSN	
June 11	Dual Survival	Discovery Channel	
June 13	Holly's World	E!	
June 13	Rubicon	AMC	
June 13	Unnatural History	Cartoon Network	
June 16	Bert the Conqueror	Travel Channel	
June 16	Hot in Cleveland	TV Land	
June 20	The Real L Word	Showtime	
June 20	The Gates	ABC	
June 20	Scoundrels	ABC	
June 22	Memphis Beat	TNT	
June 24	Rookie Blue	ABC	
June 27	Mary Shelley's Frankenhole	Adult Swim	
June 28	Huge	ABC Family	
June 29	Louie	FX	
July 9	Haven	Syfy	
July 11	The Glades	A&E	
July 12	Rizzoli & Isles	TNT	
July 13	Covert Affairs	USA Network	
July 19	RuPaul's Drag U	Logo TV	
July 20	If You Really Knew Me	MTV	
July 23	The Pillars of the Earth	Starz	
July 26	The Huckabee Show	Fox	
July 27	MasterChef	Fox	
July 28	Plain Jane	The CW	
August 2	Aftermath with William Shatner	The Biography Channel	
August 5	The Real Housewives of D.C.	Bravo	
August 9	Bachelor Pad	ABC	
August 16	The Big C	Showtime	
August 17	Big Lake	Comedy Central	
August 17	Melissa & Joey	ABC Family	
September 1	Changing Lanes	BET	
September 3	Fish Hooks	Disney Channel	
September 5	Mel B: It's a Scary World	Style	
September 6	MAD	Cartoon Network	
September 6	Regular Show	Cartoon Network	
September 6	The Cat in the Hat Knows a Lot About That!	PBS Kids	
September 6	NFL Rush Zone	Nicktoons	
September 8	Terriers	FX	
September 8	Hellcats	The CW	
September 9	Nikita	The CW	
September 10	Pair of Kings	Disney Channel	
September 10	Fashion Police	E!	
September 13	The Nate Berkus Show	Syndication	
September 13	World of Jenks	MTV	
September 13	Swift Justice with Nancy Grace	Syndication	
September 14	Sextuplets Take New York	TLC	
September 15	Outlaw	NBC	
September 17	Sym-Bionic Titan	Cartoon Network	
September 19	Boardwalk Empire	HBO	
September 19	Real and Chance: The Legend Hunters	VH1	
September 20	America's Court with Judge Ross	Syndication	
September 20	Chase	NBC	
September 20	The Event	NBC	
September 20	Mike & Molly	CBS	
September 20	Hawaii Five-0	CBS	
September 20	Lone Star	Fox	
September 21	Raising Hope	Fox	
September 21	Running Wilde	Fox	
September 21	Detroit 1-8-7	ABC	
September 22	Better with You	ABC	
September 22	The Whole Truth	ABC	
September 22	The Defenders	CBS	
September 22	Undercovers	NBC	
September 22	The Avengers: Earth's Mightiest Heroes	Disney XD	
September 23	My Generation	ABC	
September 23	Outsourced	NBC	
September 23	$#*! My Dad Says	CBS	
September 24	Blue Bloods	CBS	
September 25	Noodle and Doodle	Sprout	
September 26	Sister Wives	TLC	
September 27	The Last Word with Lawrence O'Donnell	MSNBC	
September 28	No Ordinary Family	ABC	
September 29	Law & Order: LA	NBC	
October 2	Planet Sheen	Nickelodeon	
October 2	T.U.F.F. Puppy	Nickelodeon	
October 3	IRT Deadliest Roads	History	
October 4	The A-List: New York	Logo	
October 4	The Arrangement	Logo	
October 4	Parker Spitzer	CNN	
October 4	Chuggington	Playhouse Disney	
October 8	Gigantic	TeenNick	
October 10	Food Feuds	Food Network	
October 10	Cosmic Quantum Ray	The Hub	
October 10	Deltora Quest	The Hub	
October 10	Dennis the Menace and Gnasher	The Hub	
October 10	Family Game Night	The Hub	
October 10	Pokémon: Diamond and Pearl: Sinnoh League Victors	The Hub	
October 10	Pound Puppies	The Hub	
October 10	My Little Pony: Friendship Is Magic	The Hub	
October 10	Strawberry Shortcake's Berry Bitty Adventures	The Hub	
October 10	The Twisted Whiskers Show	The Hub	
October 11	Animal Mechanicals	The Hub	
October 11	In the Night Garden...	The Hub	
October 11	Pictureka!	The Hub	
October 11	Zevo-3	Nicktoons	
October 12	Nick Swardson's Pretend Time	Comedy Central	
October 12	Tower Prep	Cartoon Network	
October 14	The Real Housewives of Beverly Hills	Bravo	
October 14	The Vanilla Ice Project	DIY Network	
October 15	The Adventures of Chuck and Friends	The Hub	
October 15	School Pride	NBC	
October 17	Luther	BBC America	
October 18	The Talk	CBS	
October 18	Bret Michaels: Life as I Know It	VH1	
October 20	That's Tough	G4	
October 24	Sherlock	PBS	
October 24	Dessert First with Anne Thornton	Food Network	
October 25	American Restoration	History	
October 25	Robotomy	Cartoon Network	
October 28	Police Women of Dallas	TLC	
October 29	R. L. Stine's The Haunting Hour: The Series	Hub Network	
October 30	America Now	Syndication	
October 31	The Walking Dead	AMC	
November 5	Hubworld	The Hub	
November 7	Married to Rock	E!	
November 7	Shake It Up	Disney Channel	
November 8	Conan	TBS	
November 16	Glory Daze	TBS	
November 21	Top Gear	History	
November 22	Skating with the Stars	ABC	
November 22	Babar and the Adventures of Badou	Playhouse Disney	
November 26	The Fran Drescher Show	Syndication	
November 26	Young Justice	Cartoon Network	
November 26	G.I. Joe: Renegades	The Hub	
November 26	Transformers: Prime	The Hub	
December 1	Storage Wars	A&E	
December 3	Take Two with Phineas and Ferb	Disney Channel	
December 5	The Hasselhoffs	A&E	
December 6	Next Great Baker	TLC	
December 20	Million Dollar Money Drop	Fox	
December 20	Perfect Couples	NBC	
December 29	My Strange Addiction	TLC	

=== Entering syndication this year ===
Show	Seasons	In Production	Source
Curb Your Enthusiasm	September 13, 2010 - September 17, 2011	Yes	
Entourage	September 13, 2010 - September 17, 2011	Yes	
American Dad!	September 20, 2010 - August 14, 2020	Yes	
Fish Hooks	October 4, 2010 - July 31, 2026	No	
Good Luck Charlie	May 10, 2010 - January 26, 2018	Yes	
How I Met Your Mother	September 13, 2010 - August 30, 2020	Yes	
I'm in the Band	January 25, 2010 - December 31, 2016	7	
Kick Buttowski: Suburban Daredevil	March 22, 2010 - October 4, 2020	11	
Pair of Kings	October 4, 2010 - June 15, 2018	8	
Shake It Up	December 13, 2010 - December 15, 2019	10	
The New Adventures of Old Christine	September 13, 2010 - September 13, 2013	No	
The Avengers: Earth's Mightiest Heroes	November 8, 2010 - April 5, 2015	Yes	
Ugly Betty	September 12, 2010 - June 24, 2012	2	
Tyler Perry’s Meet the Browns	September 20, 2010 - August 28, 2016	6	

=== Changes of network affiliation ===
Show	Moved From	Moved To	Source
The Mighty B!	Nickelodeon	Nicktoons	
American Chopper: Senior vs. Junior	TLC	Discovery Channel	
Hole in the Wall	Fox	Cartoon Network	
Childrens Hospital	The WB	Adult Swim	
The Martha Stewart Show	Syndication	Hallmark Channel	
Southland	NBC	TNT	
Merlin	NBC	Syfy	
He-Man and the Masters of the Universe	Syndication	Qubo Channel	
She-Ra: Princess of Power	Syndication	Qubo Channel	
Filmation's Ghostbusters	Syndication	Qubo Channel	
BraveStarr	Syndication	Qubo Channel	
WWE SmackDown	MyNetworkTV	Syfy	
Pocoyo	PBS Kids	Nick Jr. Channel	

=== Returning this year ===
Show	Last Aired	Previous network	Retitled as/Same	New network	Returning	Source
The Tonight Show with Jay Leno	2009	NBC	Same	Same	March 1	
Shaggy & Scooby-Doo Get a Clue!	2008	Kids' WB	Scooby-Doo! Mystery Incorporated	Cartoon Network	April 5	
Jon & Kate Plus 8	2009	TLC	Kate Plus 8	Same	June 6	
Last Comic Standing	2008	NBC	Same	Same	June 7	
Futurama	2009	Comedy Central	Same	Same	June 24	
Mad TV	2009	Fox	MAD	Cartoon Network	September 6	
Judge Karen	2009	Syndication	Judge Karen's Court	Same	September 20	
Spliced	2009	Qubo	Same	Same	September 28	
Hole in the Wall	2009	Fox	Same	Cartoon Network	October 6	

=== Milestone episodes ===
Show	Network	Episode #	Episode Title	Episode airdate	Source
The Simpsons	Fox	450th	"Thursdays with Abie"	January 3	
How I Met Your Mother	CBS	100th	"Girls vs. Suits"	January 11	
NCIS	CBS	150th	"Flesh and Blood"	January 12	
Ghost Whisperer	CBS	100th	"Implosion"	March 5	
Supernanny	ABC	100th	"100th Episode Special"	March 12	
Cold Case	CBS	150th	"One Fall"	March 14	
South Park	Comedy Central	200th	"200"	April 14	
SpongeBob SquarePants	Nickelodeon	150th	"Krusty Dogs"	October 9	
SpongeBob SquarePants	Nickelodeon	150th	"The Wreck of the Mauna Loa"	October 9	
Smallville	The CW	200th	"Isis"	October 22	
Dancing with the Stars	ABC	200th	Week 7: 200th Episode Week	November 2	
The Amazing Race	CBS	200th	"There's a Lot of Nuts and Bullets"	November 21	
Survivor	CBS	10th Anniversary	"Slay Everyone, Trust No One" – "The Reunion"	February 11 – May 16	
Dora the Explorer	Nickelodeon	10th Anniversary	"Dora's Big Birthday Adventure"	August 15	
Big Brother	CBS	10th Anniversary	"Episode 1" – "Episode 30"	July 8 – September 15	
CSI: Crime Scene Investigation	CBS	10th Anniversary	"Blood Moon"	October 7	
Family Guy	Fox	150th	"Welcome Back, Carter"	October 10	
Curb Your Enthusiasm	HBO	10th Anniversary	"The Divorce"	October 15	
American Dad!	Fox	100th	"Stan's Food Restaurant"	November 14	

=== Ending this year ===
Date	Show	Network	Debut	Status	Source
January 2	Face the Ace	NBC	2009	Cancelled	
January 8	It's a Big Big World	PBS Kids	2006	Cancelled	
January 17	The Jacksons: A Family Dynasty	A&E	2009	Cancelled	
January 22	The Tonight Show with Conan O'Brien	NBC	2009	Cancelled	
January 26	Better Off Ted	ABC	2009	Cancelled	
January 29	Dollhouse	Fox	2009	Cancelled	
January 29	The Live Desk	Fox News Channel	2006	Cancelled	
January 30	The Secret Saturdays	Cartoon Network	2008	Cancelled	
February 8	Heroes (returned in 2015)	NBC	2006	Cancelled	
February 9	The Jay Leno Show	NBC	2009	Cancelled	
February 11	6teen	Cartoon Network	2004	Ended	
February 11	American Chopper (returned in 2018)	Discovery Channel	2003	Cancelled	
February 12	Bullrun	Cartoon Network	2007	Cancelled	
February 16	WWE ECW	Syfy	2006	Cancelled	
February 21	Secrets of Aspen	VH1	2010	Cancelled	
February 25	The Deep End	ABC	2010	Cancelled	
March 1	Let's Talk About Pep	VH1	2010	Cancelled	
March 3	Nip/Tuck	FX	2003	Ended	
March 8	Tracey Ullman's State of the Union	Showtime	2008	Cancelled	
March 11	Carnie Wilson: Unstapled	GSN	2010	Cancelled	
March 12	Numbers	CBS	2005	Cancelled	
March 13	Chaotic	Cartoon Network	2006	Cancelled	
March 17	Gary Unmarried	CBS	2008	Cancelled	
March 17	Scrubs (returned in 2026)	ABC	2001	Cancelled	
March 20	Seducing Cindy	Fox Reality Channel	2010	Cancelled	
March 20	Solitary	Fox Reality Channel	2006	Cancelled	
March 26	Ben 10: Alien Force	Cartoon Network	2008	Cancelled	
March 28	Frank the Entertainer in a Basement Affair	VH1	2010	Cancelled	
March 29	Kell on Earth	Bravo	2010	Cancelled	
April 2	Worldfocus	PBS	2008	Cancelled	
April 13	Melrose Place	The CW	2009	Cancelled	
April 14	Ugly Betty	ABC	2006	Cancelled	
April 15	The Sarah Silverman Program	Comedy Central	2007	Cancelled	
April 15	Important Things with Demetri Martin	Comedy Central	2009	Cancelled	
April 21	Accidentally on Purpose	CBS	2009	Cancelled	
April 26	Trauma	NBC	2009	Cancelled	
April 27	Unsolved Mysteries (returned in 2020)	Spike	1987	Cancelled	
April 28	High Society	The CW	2010	Cancelled	
April 30	Amanpour (returned in 2012)	CNN	2009	Cancelled	
April 30	NOW	PBS	2002	Cancelled	
April 30	Bill Moyers Journal	PBS	1972	Cancelled	
May 2	Cold Case	CBS	2003	Cancelled	
May 3	The Price of Beauty	VH1	2010	Cancelled	
May 3	TRANSform Me	VH1	2010	Cancelled	
May 3	Greensburg	Planet Green	2008	Cancelled	
May 6	King of the Hill (returned in 2025)	Syndication	1997	Cancelled	
May 7	Fox Business Morning	Fox News Network	2007	Cancelled	
May 12	The New Adventures of Old Christine	CBS	2006	Cancelled	
May 12	Mercy	NBC	2009	Cancelled	
May 15	The Wanda Sykes Show	Fox	2009	Cancelled	
May 15	American Idol Rewind	Syndication	2006	Cancelled	
May 16	The Pacific	HBO	2010	Cancelled	
May 17	Romantically Challenged	ABC	2010	Cancelled	
May 21	Ghost Whisperer	CBS	2005	Cancelled	
May 22	Legend of the Seeker	Syndication	2008	Cancelled	
May 23	Lost	ABC	2004	Ended	
May 24	24 (returned in 2014 and 2017)	Fox	2001	Ended	
May 24	Law & Order (returned in 2022)	NBC	1990	Cancelled	
May 24	10 Things I Hate About You	ABC Family	2009	Cancelled	
May 27	FlashForward	ABC	2009	Cancelled	
May 28	The Bonnie Hunt Show	Syndication	2008	Cancelled	
May 28	Deal or No Deal (returned in 2018)	Syndication	2005	Cancelled	
May 28	The Tyra Banks Show	Syndication	2005	Cancelled	
May 28	Zane's Sex Chronicles	Cinemax	2008	Cancelled	
June 11	Past Life	Fox	2010	Cancelled	
June 20	'Til Death	Fox	2006	Cancelled	
June 20	The Tudors	Showtime	2007	Ended	
June 21	Saving Grace	TNT	2007	Cancelled	
July 1	100 Questions	NBC	2010	Cancelled	
July 1	Happy Town	ABC	2010	Cancelled	
July 2	Miami Medical	CBS	2010	Cancelled	
July 3	The Forgotten	ABC	2009	Cancelled	
July 3	Three Rivers	CBS	2009	Cancelled	
July 7	Dinner: Impossible (returned in 2021)	Food Network	2007	Cancelled	
July 8	Mall Cops: Mall of America	TLC	2010	Cancelled	
July 12	Wow! Wow! Wubbzy!	Nickelodeon	2006	Cancelled	
July 13	The Hills (returned in 2019)	MTV	2006	Ended	
July 13	The City	MTV	2008	Cancelled	
July 15	Most Daring	truTV	2006	Cancelled	
July 21	Campbell Brown	CNN	2008	Cancelled	
July 23	Cyberchase (returned in 2013)	PBS Kids	2002	Cancelled	
July 26	Neighbors from Hell	TBS	2010	Cancelled	
July 30	Aaron Stone	Disney XD	2009	Cancelled	
August 1	Sons of Tucson	Fox	2010	Cancelled	
August 3	Kathy Griffin: My Life on the D-List	Bravo	2005	Cancelled	
August 3	One Big Happy Family	TLC	2009	Cancelled	
August 7	Chowder	Cartoon Network	2007	Cancelled	
August 12	Penn & Teller: Bullshit!	Showtime	2003	Cancelled	
August 13	Wife Swap (returned in 2013)	ABC	2004	Cancelled	
August 14	At the Movies	Syndication	1986	Cancelled	
August 14	Players	Spike	2010	Cancelled	
August 15	Scoundrels	ABC	2010	Cancelled	
August 17	18 to Life	The CW	2010	Cancelled	
August 22	Storm Stories (returned in 2019)	The Weather Channel	2003	Cancelled	
August 23	Pink Panther and Pals	Cartoon Network	2010	Cancelled	
August 27	The Pillars of the Earth	Starz	2010	Cancelled	
August 30	Huge	ABC Family	2010	Cancelled	
August 30	The Marvelous Misadventures of Flapjack	Cartoon Network	2008	Cancelled	
August 30	Jeffery & Cole Casserole	Logo	2009	Cancelled	
August 31	Shaq Vs.	ABC	2009	Cancelled	
September 1	Plain Jane	The CW	2010	Cancelled	
September 8	Criss Angel Mindfreak	A&E	2005	Cancelled	
September 12	My Boys	TBS	2006	Cancelled	
September 14	Big Lake	Comedy Central	2010	Cancelled	
September 15	Dark Blue	TNT	2009	Cancelled	
September 17	As the World Turns	CBS	1956	Cancelled	
September 19	The Gates	ABC	2010	Cancelled	
September 21	Unnatural History	Cartoon Network	2010	Cancelled	
September 21	Solved	Investigation Discovery	2010	Cancelled	
September 27	Lone Star	Fox	2010	Cancelled	
September 30	My Generation	ABC	2010	Cancelled	
October 1	Rick's List	CNN	2010	Cancelled	
October 1	Daily 10	E!	2006	Cancelled	
October 3	Caillou (returned in 2023)	PBS Kids	1997	Cancelled	
October 3	Jonas	Disney Channel	2009	Cancelled	
October 7	Mel B: It's a Scary World	Style Network	2010	Cancelled	
October 9	My Friends Tigger & Pooh	Playhouse Disney	2007	Cancelled	
October 17	Rubicon	AMC	2010	Cancelled	
October 18	Atom TV	Comedy Central	2008	Cancelled	
October 20	Changing Lanes	BET	2010	Cancelled	
October 21	The Real Housewives of D.C.	Bravo	2010	Cancelled	
November 2	Barney & Friends	PBS Kids	1992	Cancelled	
November 4	Fetch! with Ruff Ruffman	PBS Kids	2006	Cancelled	
November 10	Most Shocking	truTV	2006	Cancelled	
November 13	Angelina Ballerina: The Next Steps	PBS Kids	2009	Cancelled	
November 13	Outlaw	NBC	2010	Cancelled	
November 21	The Venture Bros. (returned in 2013)	Adult Swim	2003	Cancelled	
November 22	Between the Lions	PBS Kids	2000	Cancelled	
November 26	School Pride	NBC	2010	Cancelled	
November 28	Fantasia for Real	VH1	2010	Cancelled	
November 28	Psychic Kids (returned in 2019)	A&E	2008	Cancelled	
November 29	The Buried Life	MTV	2010	Cancelled	
December 1	Terriers	FX	2010	Cancelled	
December 1	The Arrangement	Logo	2010	Cancelled	
December 1	The Twisted Whiskers Show	The Hub	2010	Cancelled	
December 5	The Hasselhoffs	A&E	2010	Cancelled	
December 5	Tim and Eric Awesome Show, Great Job!	Adult Swim	2007	Cancelled	
December 7	In Treatment (returned in 2021)	HBO	2008	Cancelled	
December 10	The Good Guys	Fox	2010	Cancelled	
December 16	Larry King Live	CNN	1985	Ended	
December 17	The Fran Drescher Show	Syndication	2010	Cancelled	
December 21	Skating with the Stars	ABC	2010	Cancelled	
December 28	Tower Prep	Cartoon Network	2010	Cancelled	
December 29	Undercovers	NBC	2010	Cancelled	

=== Made-for-TV movies and miniseries ===
Premiere date	Title	Channel	Ref.
January 15	Lego Atlantis: The Movie	Cartoon Network	
February 13	Starstruck	Disney Channel	
April 7	The Buddha	PBS	
May 10	Straight Outta L.A.	ESPN	
May 24	The Lazarus Effect	HBO	
August 13	Den Brother	Disney Channel	
September 3	Camp Rock 2: The Final Jam	Disney Channel	
September 18	Fred: The Movie	Nickelodeon	
October 16	Scooby-Doo! Curse of the Lake Monster	Cartoon Network	
October 23	The Boy Who Cried Werewolf	Nickelodeon	
November 12	Avalon High	Disney Channel	
November 24	Firebreather	Cartoon Network	

== Networks and services ==
=== Launches ===
Network	Type	Launch date	Notes	Source
Legacy TV	Cable television	January 11		
RT America	Cable television	February		
SWRV	Cable television	February 10		
Inmigrante TV	Cable television	February 13		
Foro	Cable television	February 15		
Epix 2	Cable television	May 12		
The Weather Cast	Cable television	May 20		
ESPN 3D	Cable television	June 11		
n3D	Cable television	July 1		
The 3 From Epix	Cable television	August 11		
Willow	Cable and satellite	August 27		
ESPN Goal Line & Bases Loaded	Cable television	September 4		
Sony Movie Channel	Cable television	October 1		
Hulu Plus	Subscription video-on-demand/OTT streaming service	November 17		
MeTV	Cable television	December 15		

=== Conversions and rebrandings ===
Old network name	New network name	Type	Conversion Date	Notes	Source
Fox Sports en Espanol	Fox Deportes	Cable television	Unknown		
Gospel Music Channel	GMC	Cable television	Unknown		

=== Closures ===
Network	Type	Closure date	Notes	Source
Gems TV	Cable television	April 15		
The Weather Cast	Cable television	May 24		
Research Channel	Cable television	August 31		

== Television stations ==
=== Station launches ===
Date	Market	Station	Channel	Affiliation	Ref.
Unknown date	Mason City, Iowa/Rochester, Minnesota	KIMT-DT3	3.3	Independent/Weather	
January 1	Macon, Georgia	WGXA-DT2	16.2	ABC	
July 21	Canton/Waynesville, North Carolina	WUNW-TV	27.1; 27.2; 27.3; 27.4; 27.5	UNC-TV Explorer Channel; PBS/UNC-TV; PBS Kids (UNC-TV programmed); UNC-ED; North Carolina Channel	
May 15	Kirksville, Missouri/Ottumwa, Iowa	KTVO-DT2	3.2	CBS	
October 6	Tupelo, Mississippi	WEPH	49.1	Christian Television Network	
December 7	Senatobia, Mississippi/Memphis, Tennessee	WWTW	34.1	Independent	
December 13	Greenville/Greenwood, Mississippi	WNBD-LD	33.1	NBC	

=== Station closures ===
Date	Market	Station	Channel	Affiliation	Sign-on date	Ref.
July 31	Waco, Texas	KWBU-TV	34.1/34.2; 34.3	Create; V-me (DT3)	May 22, 1989	

=== Stations changing network affiliation ===
Date	Market	Station	Channel	Prior Affiliation	New affiliation	Source
January 1	Perry/Macon, Georgia	WPGA-TV	58.1	ABC	Independent	
May 9	Ada, Oklahoma/Sherman, Texas	KTEN-DT3	10.3	Weather	ABC	
October 30	San Antonio, Texas	KCWX	2.1	The CW	MyNetworkTV	
October 30	San Antonio, Texas	KMYS	35.1	MyNetworkTV	The CW	

== Deaths ==
=== January ===
Date	Name	Age	Notability	Source
January 2	David Gerber	86	Television executive (Columbia Pictures Television and MGM Television) and producer (Police Woman, Batman, Room 222, thirtysomething)	
January 4	Rory Markas	54	Television and radio sportscaster (Los Angeles Angels of Anaheim and Milwaukee Brewers play-by-play announcer; Sports anchor/reporter at Fox Sports West/Prime Ticket and Los Angeles TV stations KCBS-TV and KTTV)	
January 8	Art Clokey	88	Animator (Creator of Gumby)	
January 13	Teddy Pendergrass	59	R&B singer (Pink Lady and Jeff, 1985 Live Aid Telecast)	
January 19	Jennifer Lyon	37	Reality television participant (Survivor: Palau)	
January 22	James Mitchell	89	Actor (All My Children, The Edge of Night, Where the Heart Is)	
January 22	Jean Simmons	80	Actress, Emmy Award winner for Outstanding Supporting Actress in a Miniseries for The Thorn Birds	
January 22	Johnny Seven	83	Character actor (Ironside, Amy Prentiss)	
January 24	James Henry Quello	95	Broadcaster, politician, lawyer, consultant, and commissioner of the FCC; VP of Capital Cities Communications	
January 24	Pernell Roberts	81	Actor/singer (Bonanza, Trapper John, M.D.)	
January 27	Zelda Rubinstein	76	Actress and activist (Jennifer Slept Here, Picket Fences)	
January 29	Tom Brookshier	78	All-pro football player and NFL commentator for CBS	
January 30	Aaron Ruben	95	Television creator, screenwriter, director and producer (The Andy Griffith Show, Gomer Pyle, U.S.M.C., Headmaster, Sanford and Son)	

=== February ===
Date	Name	Age	Notability	Ref.
February 1	Justin Mentell	27	Actor (Boston Legal)	
February 3	Frances Reid	95	Actress (Days of Our Lives)	
February 4	Cecil Heftel	85	Politician (Hawaii's 1st congressional district), broadcaster and television/radio station group owner (Founder of Heftel Broadcasting, the first owners of KGMB/Honolulu, Hawaii)	
February 5	Frank Magid	78	Broadcasting/marketing consultant (founder of Frank N. Magid Associates)	
February 9	Phil Harris	53	Fishing boat captain and reality show participant (Deadliest Catch)	
February 11	Caroline McWilliams	64	Actress and director (Soap, Benson, Another World, Guiding Light)	
February 14	Andrew Koenig	41	Actor (Growing Pains)	
February 16	Bo Griffin	51	Television/radio personality (Good Day Live, Extra, GSN Live, and The Big Reveal on HGTV)	

=== March ===
Date	Name	Age	Notability	Ref.
March 4	Nan Martin	82	Actress (The Drew Carey Show)	
March 10	Corey Haim	38	Actor (half of the acting duo The Two Coreys, also appeared in a reality show of the same name).	
March 11	Merlin Olsen	69	Football player (Los Angeles Rams) and commentator (NBC/CBS Sports), actor (Little House on the Prairie, Father Murphy), commercial spokesman (FTD Florists)	
March 14	Peter Graves	83	Actor (Mission: Impossible, 7th Heaven), host of Biography	
March 18	Fess Parker	85	Actor (Davy Crockett, Daniel Boone)	
March 19	Bill McIntyre	80	Actor (Newhart, Dallas, Murphy Brown)	
March 21	Margaret Moth	58	New Zealand-born photojournalist for CNN	
March 24	Robert Culp	79	Actor (I Spy, The Greatest American Hero, Everybody Loves Raymond)	
March 25	Chet Simmons	81	Sports executive, first president of ESPN, later commissioner for the United States Football League	
March 30	David Mills	48	Screenwriter (NYPD Blue, The Corner, Kingpin, ER, The Wire)	

=== April ===
Date	Name	Age	Notability	Ref.
April 1	John Forsythe	92	Actor (Blake Carrington on Dynasty, voice of Charlie on Charlie's Angels, and starred in Bachelor Father)	
April 9	Meinhardt Raabe	94	Actor (Played Munchkin who declares "the witch is dead" in The Wizard of Oz)	
April 10	Dixie Carter	70	Actress (Designing Women, Diff'rent Strokes, Out of the Blue, The Edge of Night, Family Law)	
April 12	Peter Haskell	75	Actor (Bracken's World, Ryan's Hope)	
April 15	Benjamin Hooks	85	Former executive director of NAACP, first African- commissioner on the FCC	
April 18	Allen Swift	86	Voice actor (The Howdy Doody Show, Mighty Mouse, Underdog)	
April 20	Myles Wilder	77	Screenwriter (McHale's Navy, The Dukes of Hazzard)	
April 27	Dorothy Provine	75	Actress, comedian, dancer and singer (The Roaring 20s, The Alaskans, Man Without a Gun)	

=== May ===
Date	Name	Age	Notability	Ref.
May 1	Helen Wagner	91	Actress (As the World Turns)	
May 2	Lynn Redgrave	67	Actress (House Calls, Whatever Happened to Baby Jane?, spokesperson for Weight Watchers)	
May 4	Ernie Harwell	92	Television/radio sportscaster (voice of the Detroit Tigers for 42 seasons, called the "Shot Heard 'Round the World" on TV, recipient of the Ford C. Frick Award).	
May 9	Lena Horne	92	Actress, singer and entertainer (hosted her own special in 1969 and 1973; performed on Kraft Music Hall, The Ed Sullivan Show, The Dean Martin Show, The Judy Garland Show, The Hollywood Palace, and The Andy Williams Show)	
May 12	Allan Manings	86	Television creator and screenwriter (McHale's Navy, Rowan & Martin's Laugh-In, Good Times, One Day at a Time)	
May 19	Martin Cohan	77	Screenwriter and producer (Diff'rent Strokes, Silver Spoons, Who's the Boss?)	
May 28	Gary Coleman	42	Actor, politician and former child star, best known as Arnold Jackson on Diff'rent Strokes	
May 29	Dennis Hopper	74	Director and actor (Crash, spokesperson for Ameriprise Financial)	

=== June ===
Date	Name	Age	Notability	Ref.
June 3	Rue McClanahan	76	Actress, best known as Vivian Harmon on Maude, Fran Crowley on Mama's Family, and her Emmy Award-winning role as Blanche Devereaux on The Golden Girls	
June 5	Robert Wussler	73	Broadcasting executive (CBS, Turner Sports)	
June 13	Jimmy Dean	81	Singer, Television personality (The Jimmy Dean Show) and businessman	
June 19	Vince O'Brien	91	Character actor (Westinghouse Studio One, Dark Shadows, Ryan's Hope, Law & Order; known as the Shell Answer Man)	
June 23	Allyn Ferguson	85	Composer (Charlie's Angels and Barney Miller theme songs)	
June 28	Robert Byrd	92	Politician and musician (appeared on Hee Haw as a musical guest)	

=== July ===
Date	Name	Age	Notability	Ref.
July 11	Bob Sheppard	99	Public address announcer for the New York Yankees (1951–2007) and for the New York Giants (1956–2006). Voice can be heard in shows and films set at Yankees and Giants games (including several episodes of Seinfeld), as well as in commercials for YES Network.	
July 13	George Steinbrenner	80	Businessman, owner of the New York Yankees since 1973, founder and owner of YES Network	
July 15	Peter Fernandez	83	Voice actor (Speed Racer, Courage the Cowardly Dog)	
July 16	James Gammon	70	Actor (Nash Bridges, Bagdad Cafe)	
July 20	Peta Rutter	51	New Zealand actress (Udonna the Sorceress in Power Rangers: Mystic Force).	
July 23	Daniel Schorr	93	Radio/television news reporter and journalist for CBS News and CNN	
July 27	Maury Chaykin	61	Actor who portrayed Nero Wolfe in the TV film The Golden Spiders: A Nero Wolfe Mystery and the A&E 2001–02 series A Nero Wolfe Mystery.	
July 28	John Aylesworth	81	Screenwriter and producer (Co-creator of Hee Haw; writer for Your Hit Parade, The Sonny and Cher Show, The Julie Andrews Hour, Hullabaloo, and Kraft Music Hall)	
July 29	Bernie West	92	Actor, screenwriter and director (All In The Family, Maude, Three's Company, The Jeffersons)	
July 29	Lorene Yarnell	66	Actress, mime performer, dancer and television personality (Shields & Yarnell)	
July 31	Dan Resin	79	Actor (On Our Own, Edge of Night, Lovers and Friends, Captain Kangaroo, Madhouse Brigade, Remember WENN)	
July 31	Mitch Miller	99	Musician, band leader, record executive and television personality (Sing Along With Mitch)	

=== August ===
Date	Name	Age	Notability	Ref.
August 8	Patricia Neal	84	Actress (played Olivia Walton in The Homecoming: A Christmas Story and as herself in The Patricia Neal Story )	
August 9	Ted Stevens	86	Politician (U.S. Senator from Alaska, 1968–2009); member of The United States Senate Committee on Commerce, Science and Transportation, which oversees Communications in the United States, including the television industry, of which he made critical opinions and decisions about during his tenure	
August 10	David L. Wolper	82	Producer (North and South, Roots, The Thorn Birds and the opening and closing ceremonies of the 1984 Olympic Games in Los Angeles)	
August 13	Edwin Newman	91	Broadcast journalist, NBC anchor, and author (Today, Meet the Press)	
August 14	Gloria Winters	78	Actress and author (Sky King)	
August 15	James J. Kilpatrick	89	Conservative commentator, journalist, newspaper editor and television personality (60 Minutes)	
August 21	Harold Dow	62	Radio and television journalist for CBS News	

=== September ===
Date	Name	Age	Notability	Ref.
September 2	Morgan White	86	Actor and children's television host (Pogo Poge on Checkers & Pogo at KGMB-TV/Honolulu and on Hawaii Five-O)	
September 5	David Dortort	93	Television producer and screenwriter (Bonanza, The High Chaparral)	
September 8	John Kluge	95	German-born television/radio broadcaster and founder/chairman of Metromedia	
September 11	Harold Gould	86	Character actor (Rhoda, The Mary Tyler Moore Show, The Golden Girls)	
September 11	Kevin McCarthy	96	Character actor (Flamingo Road)	
September 17	Marilyn Cantor Baker	89	Screenwriter and actress (Love, Sidney)	
September 23	Arthur Holch	86	Emmy Award-winning television director and producer	
September 25	Art Gilmore	98	Actor and voice actor (Highway Patrol)	
September 29	Greg Giraldo	44	Stand-up comedian (Last Comic Standing, The Comedy Central Roasts)	
September 29	Tony Curtis	85	Actor (Some Like It Hot, The Defiant Ones, guest spots on several television shows, including his only starring series, McCoy)	
September 30	Stephen J. Cannell	69	Television creator, screenwriter, director, author, and actor (The A-Team, Riptide, The Greatest American Hero, Hunter, The Rockford Files, 21 Jump Street)	

=== October ===
Date	Name	Age	Notability	Ref.
October 16	Barbara Billingsley	94	Actress (June Cleaver on Leave It to Beaver, the voice of "Nanny" on Muppet Babies)	
October 19	Tom Bosley	83	Actor (Howard Cunningham on Happy Days, Sheriff Amos Tupper on Murder, She Wrote, twin brothers Frank and Blaine Dowling on Father Dowling Mysteries), and voice actor (Harry on Wait Till Your Father Gets Home and the title character on The World of David the Gnome)	
October 27	Denise Borino-Quinn	46	Television actress and lawyer (The Sopranos)	
October 27	James Wall	92	Television actor and stage manager (Mr. Baxter on Captain Kangaroo; stage manager for CBS shows including 60 Minutes and Face the Nation)	
October 28	James MacArthur	72	Actor (played Danny "Danno" Williams in the original Hawaii Five-O)	
October 30	Arthur Bernard Lewis	84	Producer (Dallas)	

=== November ===
Date	Name	Age	Notability	Ref.
November 1	Charlie O'Donnell	78	Announcer (Wheel of Fortune, American Bandstand) and news anchor (KCOP-TV)	
November 4	Julien Hug	35	Reality television participant and restaurant owner (The Bachelorette Season 5)	
November 4	Sparky Anderson	76	Major League Baseball manager (led both the Cincinnati Reds and Detroit Tigers to World Series titles), later a baseball color commentator on television and radio.	
November 5	Jill Clayburgh	66	Actress (Ally McBeal)	
November 10	Dave Niehaus	75	Ford C. Frick Award-winning sportscaster, voice of the Seattle Mariners since the team's inception in 1977.	
November 28	Leslie Nielsen	84	Actor and comedian (The Naked Gun, Forbidden Planet, The Poseidon Adventure, and Airplane!)	
November 29	Al Masini	80	Television producer (creator of Entertainment Tonight, Lifestyles of the Rich and Famous, Solid Gold, and Star Search)	

=== December ===
Date	Name	Age	Notability	Ref.
December 5	Don Meredith	72	NFL player (Dallas Cowboys), later color commentator on Monday Night Football and NBC's NFL coverage	
December 14	Neva Patterson	90	Actress (The Governor and J.J., V: The Original Miniseries, V: The Final Battle)	
December 15	Blake Edwards	88	Producer, director and screenwriter (Peter Gunn)	
December 20	Steve Landesberg	74	Actor and comedian (Barney Miller)	
December 25	Bud Greenspan	84	Documentarian, screenwriter and sports reporter	
December 26	Teena Marie	54	R&B/Dance singer, songwriter and actress (The Beverly Hillbillies; her 1981 song "Square Biz" was re-worked by Marie as the theme for The Hollywood Squares)	

== See also ==
- 2010 in the United States
- List of American films of 2010
