= Berkus =

Berkus is a surname. Notable people with the surname include:

- Barry Berkus (1935–2012), American architect
- Dave Berkus (born 1941), American angel investor and venture capitalist
- Günther Berkus (1951–2020), German-Irish artist, musician, and director
- Nate Berkus (born 1971), American interior designer, author, and television personality
