= Nate Berkus =

American interior designer (born 1971)

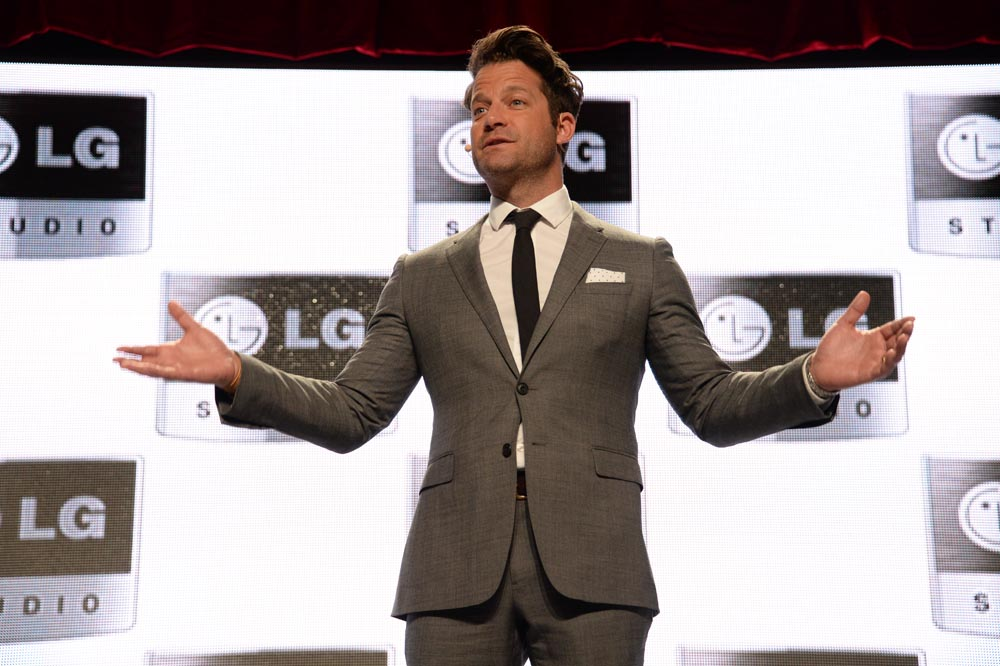
- Berkus in CES 2014
- Born: Nathan Jay Berkus; September 17, 1971 (age 55); Orange County, California, U.S.
- Education: Lake Forest College
- Occupations: Interior decorator, television host
- Years active: 1995–present
- Spouse: Jeremiah Brent (m. 2014)
- Children: 2
- Website: nateberkus.com

Nathan Jay Berkus (born September 17, 1971) is an American interior designer, author, and television personality. He runs the Chicago interior design firm Nate Berkus Associates and was a regularly featured guest on The Oprah Winfrey Show, offering design advice to viewers as well as coordinating surprise make-overs for people's homes. He has released numerous lines of products and authored several books.

His talk show, The Nate Berkus Show, debuted in broadcast syndication on September 13, 2010, featuring make-overs, culture, design, and personal advice. It was co-produced by Harpo Productions and Sony Pictures Television, and was cancelled in 2012 after two seasons. From 2017 to 2019, Berkus co-hosted the TLC reality design series Nate & Jeremiah by Design, alongside his husband Jeremiah Brent. From 2020 to 2021, the couple co-hosted the HGTV show Nate & Jeremiah Save My House, where they stepped in to help couples stuck in poor renovation efforts with their home. Currently, the couple co-hosts HGTV's The Nate and Jeremiah Home Project.

== Early life and education ==
Berkus was born on September 17, 1971, in Orange County, California. Nancy Golden, a designer who was featured in multiple series on HGTV and DIY Network, is his mother. His father, Michael A. Berkus, co-founded the National Sports Collectors Convention. His parents divorced in 1973. Berkus grew up in a Jewish family mainly in Hopkins, Minnesota. He attended Cushing Academy, a boarding school in Ashburnham, Massachusetts.

Berkus started working in design immediately after leaving high school and interned at Dominique Aurientis in Paris and Leslie Hindman in Chicago. Berkus graduated from Lake Forest College in 1994, with B.A. degrees in French and Sociology. He founded the company, Nate Berkus Associates, in Chicago in 1995. Berkus is related to the venture capitalist Dave Berkus, architect Barry Berkus, musician/artist Günther Berkus, Josh Berkus of Software in the Public Interest, casino manager/author Eric David Berkus, and lawyer Matt Berkus.

== Career overview ==
In November 2005, Hyperion Books published Berkus's book Home Rules: Transform the Place You Live into a Place You'll Love (ISBN 1-4013-0137-1), a step-by-step guide to home design and decoration.

In 2005, Berkus began selling his merchandise at Linens 'n Things stores throughout North America.

Berkus was the host of the short-lived reality show Oprah's Big Give, which premiered March 2, 2008, but the series ended on April 20 that same year. On May 13, 2008, it was announced by ABC that it would not be renewed for a second season.

On September 13, 2010, he debuted as the host of his own syndicated daily show, The Nate Berkus Show, which was co-produced by Harpo Productions and Sony Pictures Television. It was recorded in Studio 42 at the CBS Broadcast Center in New York, but aired in the nation's largest markets on the ten NBC-owned-and-operated stations. His guests included sex therapist Dr. Ruth Westheimer, whose living room and dining room he redecorated, after 50 years. In December 2011, Sony Pictures decided not to renew The Nate Berkus Show for a third season. Berkus is also an executive producer of the 2011 film The Help.

Berkus appeared as himself on the October 12, 2011, and October 13, 2011, episodes of Days of Our Lives, a United States daytime television soap opera, designing the offices of MadWorld Cosmetics for Madison James.

His book The Things That Matter was published October 16, 2012, by Spiegel & Grau. It became a New York Times Best Seller and was named "One of the Best Interior Design Books of the Year" by the Washington Post.

In October 2012, Berkus collaborated with Target stores to launch his Target Home collection, a 150-piece line that includes bedding, bath, accessories, lighting, rugs, and window treatments. Since then he has released many different collections for season changes as well as holidays. He recently released a line of stationery and office essentials alongside his 2015 Cali-inspired spring collection.

In January 2013, Berkus introduced his own fabric collection at Calico Corners.

In March 2013, television journalists noted Berkus began working on a primetime series with NBC, initially titled Renovation Nation. By May 2013 the title was changed to American Dream Builders. Berkus was the host and one of the producers of the show in which, according to NBC, "American top designers, builders, architects and landscapers go head-to-head each week, putting their talents to the test on extreme home renovations." The show was not renewed after its first season.

Alongside his husband, interior designer Jeremiah Brent, he launched in 2017 the TV show Nate & Jeremiah by Design broadcast on TLC network. On August 30, 2017, it was announced that Nate & Jeremiah by Design had been picked up for a second season. They have been on the HGTV Show The Nate and Jeremiah Home Project since 2021.

In 2020, Berkus helped rebuild Ellicott City, Maryland in Gordon Ramsay's special.

== Personal life ==
In December 2004, Berkus and his then-partner, photographer Fernando Bengoechea, were vacationing at a beach resort in Sri Lanka when the 2004 Indian Ocean tsunami hit. While Berkus survived, Bengoechea was missing and presumed dead. Berkus appeared on The Oprah Winfrey Show on January 17, 2005, to talk about the ordeal and the loss of his partner.

In April 2013 Berkus became engaged to fellow interior designer Jeremiah Brent after nearly a year of dating. They were married on May 4, 2014, in Manhattan. They have two children. Berkus and his family currently live in Manhattan. Nate and his partner also own a country home-farm in Portugal which they spent several years restoring. It was featured in Architectural Digest in May 2026.

In early 2014, they were featured in clothier Banana Republic's "True Outfitters" ads in InStyle and Rolling Stone, among other magazines. The New York Times noted they were the first same-sex couple to be featured in ads for the magazines. Their Manhattan apartment was featured in the October 2015 issue of Architectural Digest magazine, where Berkus and Brent appeared on the cover with their daughter Poppy.

== See also ==
- Interior design
- Fernando Bengoechea
