= Jeremiah Brent =

American interior designer and television personality (born 1984)

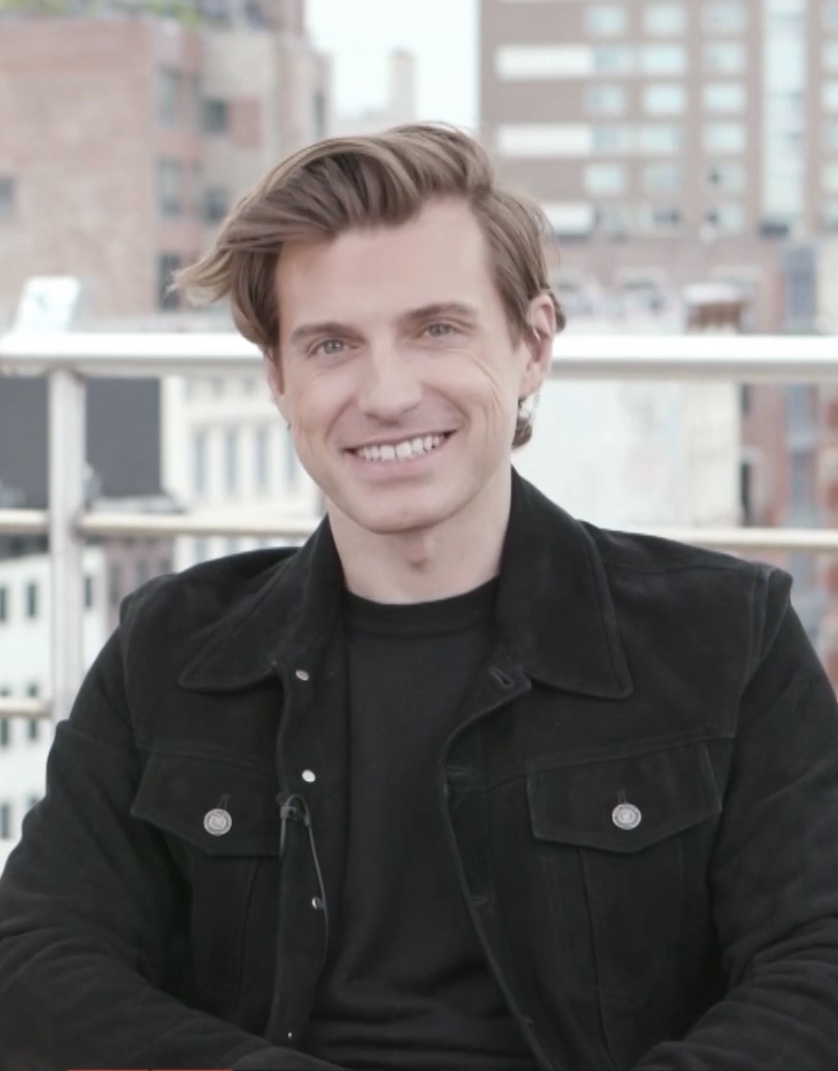
- Brent in 2022
- Born: Jeremy Clevenger Johnson; November 24, 1984 (age 41); Modesto, California, U.S.
- Other name: Jeremiah Brent Berkus
- Education: Modesto High School
- Occupations: Interior decorator, television personality
- Spouse: Nate Berkus (m. 2014)
- Children: 2

Jeremiah Brent (born Jeremy Clevenger Johnson; November 24, 1984) is an American interior designer and television personality. He founded his design firm Jeremiah Brent Design (JBD) in 2011, a full-service interior design firm based in Los Angeles and New York City. He stars in the TLC series Nate & Jeremiah by Design (2017) and as the event designer in the Netflix reality series Say I Do (2020). Most recently Jeremiah stars as the Interior Designer on Queer Eye Seasons 9 and 10.

== Early life and education ==
The son of Gwen A. Johnson and Terry Johnson, Brent was born and raised in Modesto, California. Growing up, his father was a deputy sheriff in Modesto and his mother was a paralegal in San Francisco. Brent is a 2002 graduate of Modesto High School, where he went by the name Jeremy Johnson. While at Modesto High, Brent was active in drama, speech and debate.

In 2004 at the age of 19, he moved to Los Angeles. Brent spent his first year living on friends' couches and in his Jeep. His first apartment was across the street from Covenant House, a shelter for homeless teens, which he later helped redesign.

== Career ==
Brent is an actor and producer, known for Nate & Jeremiah by Design (2017), The Nate & Jeremiah Home Project (2021), The Rachel Zoe Project (2011), Say I Do (2020), and Home Made Simple (2015). In early 2014, Brent and Nate Berkus were featured in clothier Banana Republic's "True Outfitters" ads in InStyle and Rolling Stone, among other magazines. The New York Times noted they were the first same-sex couple to be featured in ads for the magazines. Their Manhattan apartment was featured in the September 2015 issue of Architectural Digest magazine, where Jeremiah Brent and Nate Berkus appeared on the cover with their daughter Poppy.

Brent was featured in many television shows with a big break in 2011 when he became a styling associate to Rachel Zoe on her syndicated show The Rachel Zoe Project in the fourth season of the show. He has also appeared in covers of various publications such as Domino magazine, Architectural Digest, Harper's Bazaar and People magazine. He was host of the Emmy Award-winning show Home Made Simple, broadcast for two seasons on Oprah Winfrey's OWN network. Alongside his husband, fellow interior designer Nate Berkus, he launched in 2017 the TV show Nate & Jeremiah by Design broadcast on TLC network. In 2017, he also became part of Living Spaces, particularly Living Spaces presents Behind the Design. Brent and Berkus have been on the HGTV Show The Nate and Jeremiah Home Project, which premiered in 2021.

In 2020, Brent began starring as the design expert on Netflix's reality show Say I Do - a wedding version of hit show Queer Eye.

In 2024 Netflix announced Brent will be joining the Queer Eye cast as the interior design expert in season nine.

== Personal life ==
After one year of dating, he became engaged to fellow interior designer and television personality Nate Berkus in April 2013. They were married on May 4, 2014, in Manhattan. The couple's Jewish–Buddhist ceremony was officiated by the then-president of the Oprah Winfrey Network, Sheri Salata.

Brent's daughter was born in 2015 and their son in 2018. Each child has distinct egg donors and surrogates, and neither Brent nor Berkus have publicly disclosed the egg donors of their children.

In 2019, Brent and Berkus moved back to Manhattan.

== Awards and nominations ==
Year	Award	Category	Work	Result	Ref.
2025	Domino Good Design Award	Walls, Floors & Windows	Tempaper x Jeremiah Brent’s Nostalgia Collection	Won	
2025	Primetime Emmy Award	Outstanding Host for a Reality or Reality Competition Program	Queer Eye	Won	
