= Dominique Aurientis =

French fashion designer (born in 1953)

- Born: 1953 (age 72–73); Aix-en-Provence, France
- Education: La Sorbonne
- Occupation: Fashion designer

Dominique Aurientis (born in 1953 in Aix-en-Provence, France) is a French fashion designer. In 1986, she founded Dominique Aurientis, an accessories and fashion jewelry brand. One of her internship students, in Paris, was Nate Berkus, of the Nate Berkus Show.

== Life and career ==
Dominique Aurientis started her career in the Christian Dior atelier, moving on to the houses of Chanel, Givenchy, Lanvin, Ferragamo, Emilio Pucci, and Céline. She is a graduate of the University of Paris, La Sorbonne.

In 1986, she created her own collection of Jewellery and Accessories. Her collection attracted media coverage as well as distributors including: Bergdorf Goodman, Neiman Marcus, Saks Fifth Avenue, Tootsies, Harrods, Harvey Nichols, Brown's, Isetan, Joyce and others.

In the 1990s, after adopting two children in Brazil, Dominique decided to set up in Bali, where she opened a craft jewellery and interior design studio, leveraging on the renowned expertise of local Balinese artisans whilst establishing important partnerships with Indian and Thai studios. This provided her with new sources of inspiration for creating pieces bringing in traditional and eco-friendly methods, involving, for example, recycled materials such as discarded wood from railway tracks.

Dominique returned to Europe in 2000 to concentrate on her children's education. Working as a consultant for well-known Italian brands, she decided in 2008 to start a new venture. The existing distributors of the brand supported this new venture and a year later the Dominique Aurientis on-line boutique was born.

Dominique is currently based in Provence her birthplace in the south of France. Her jewellery is created from Italian and French materials. Her collections are mostly made in Italy. Her jewellery has been displayed in numerous fashion magazines around the world.
