= Thai Nguyen =

Thai Nguyen may refer to:

- Thai Nguyen (fashion designer)
- Thai Nguyen FC, football club based in Thái Nguyên province
- Thái Nguyên (city), former provincial city of Thái Nguyên province
- Thái Nguyên province, a province in northeastern Vietnam
