= Günther Berkus =

German-Irish musician, artist, and film director (1951–2020)

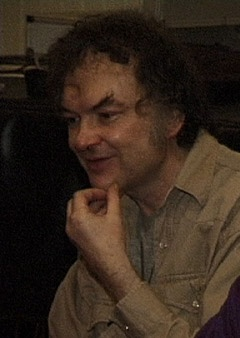
Berkus in 1995 at a Bryce Forums meetup

Günther Werner Berkus was an artist, musician and film director from Cork, Ireland.

He was born on 20 April 1951 in Münchberg, Germany. As a teenager, he studied pharmacology at the University of Münster but rapidly switched to music and art. During that period, he discovered a love of electronic music and analog synthesizers which led him to playing with such people as Ralf Hütter and Florian Fricke. In the mid-1970s, he moved to Ireland where he made his home. He had been involved in contemporary art, performance art, computer graphics and fractal music production. He was one of the early pioneers of multimedia in Cork during the late 1980s/early 1990s with his unique series of Synergy workshops and concerts. He also participated in the Soundworks series of concerts, held at the Triskel Arts Centre and later in its successor, Intermedia.

In 1995 under the name of Synergy Media Labs, he was one of the first people to start Internet web hosting in the south-west of Ireland. Later he became involved in developing and curating the Bryce online galleries of 3D art works and was an internationally recognised innovator in the field of Bryce and MojoWorld image production. In 2017, he was awarded the Pioneering Musical Practice award at the IndieCork film festival.

== Personal life ==
He was related to the venture capitalist, Dave Berkus, designer Nate Berkus, and Josh Berkus of Software in the Public Interest. He died on 11 September 2020, following decades of living with multiple sclerosis. In 2021, the album "Still, Life - Cork’s Lockdown Sounds" by a collective of Cork independent musicians, was dedicated to his memory.
