= Say I Do (TV series) =

American reality television series

- Genre: Reality
- Created by: David Collins
- Starring: Jeremiah Brent; Thai Nguyen; Gabriele Bertaccini
- Country of origin: United States
- Original language: English
- No. of seasons: 1
- No. of episodes: 8

Production
- Executive producers: David Collins; Larissa A.K. Matsson; Rob Eric; Michael Williams
- Cinematography: Matt Novello
- Running time: 52-57 minutes
- Production company: Scout Productions

Original release
- Network: Netflix
- Release: July 1, 2020

Say I Do is an American reality television series developed by Scout Productions for Netflix. Each episode features a team of three professionals, Jeremiah Brent in the field of design, Thai Nguyen in the field of fashion, and Gabriele Bertaccini in the field of cuisine, helping someone surprise their partner with a dream wedding in under a week. From the creators of Queer Eye, the 8-episode first season was available on Netflix from July 1, 2020.

== Cast ==
- Jeremiah Brent – design expert
- Thai Nguyen – fashion expert
- Gabriele Bertaccini – food expert

== Episodes ==
=== Series overview ===
Season	Episodes	Originally released
1	8	July 1, 2020

=== Season 1 ===
No. overall	No. in season	Title	Couple	Original release date
1	1	"I Do-Over"	Marcus and Tiffany	July 1, 2020
2	2	"Instant Family"	Michael and Alex	July 1, 2020
3	3	"Second Chances"	Nikko and Amber	July 1, 2020
4	4	"Love at Any Age"	Mattie and Melvin	July 1, 2020
5	5	"Kindergarten Crush"	Joe and Kerry	July 1, 2020
6	6	"In Sickness and in Health"	Jason and Jonathan	July 1, 2020
7	7	"Cinderella Wedding"	Essie and Bruce	July 1, 2020
8	8	"Me and My Guy"	Randy and Skyler	July 1, 2020

== Production ==
The series was created and executive produced by David Collins of Scout Productions. Larissa A.K. Matsson, Rob Eric, Michael Williams also executive produced with Erin Coan co-executive producing.

Principal photography for the season took place in summer and autumn 2019 across northern Kentucky, Ohio, and Indiana, mostly in and around the Greater Cincinnati and Indianapolis metropolitan areas. Local vendors were used to supply the weddings.

== Release ==
A trailer for Say I Do was released in June 2020. The episodes were available on Netflix from July 1, 2020.
