= Aftermath with William Shatner =

- Starring: William Shatner
- Country of origin: United States
- Original language: English
- No. of seasons: 2
- No. of episodes: 12

Original release
- Network: The Biography Channel
- Release: August 2, 2010 – August 9, 2011

Aftermath with William Shatner is an American television show that aired on Biography Channel from 2010 to 2014, hosted by actor William Shatner.

The series examined the long-term consequences and personal stories of people affected by major disasters, tragic events, and life-changing incidents. Shatner interviewed survivors, family members, and witnesses to explore how these events continued to impact their lives years later. Subjects of the series include The Unabomber, Randy Weaver, Jessica Lynch, and Bernhard Goetz.
