= Fernando Bengoechea =

Argentine photographer

Fernando Bengoechea (1965 – 26 December 2004) was an Argentine-born American photographer best known for his distinctive work in fashion, portraiture, and interior design photography. His images appeared in leading publications such as Elle Decor, House & Garden, and Architectural Digest. He was also known for his relationship with American interior designer Nate Berkus. Bengoechea died during the 2004 Indian Ocean tsunami while vacationing in Sri Lanka.

== 2004 tsunami and death ==
In December 2004, Bengoechea was vacationing in Sri Lanka with his partner, interior designer Nate Berkus, when the Indian Ocean earthquake and tsunami struck. The couple was staying at a beachfront resort in Arugam Bay when the tsunami hit on the morning of December 26.

Berkus survived by clinging to a telephone pole, but Bengoechea was swept away by the waves. His body was never recovered. He was 39 years old.

His death was widely reported in the international press due to his artistic profile and his connection to Berkus, who publicly honored him in later media appearances and writings.
