= Nate & Jeremiah by Design =

American reality television series

- Also known as: Nate and Jeremiah: Save My House
- Genre: Reality television
- Starring: Nate Berkus; Jeremiah Brent
- Country of origin: United States
- Original language: English
- No. of seasons: 3
- No. of episodes: 24

Production
- Running time: 41–67 minutes

Original release
- Network: TLC
- Release: April 8, 2017 – June 8, 2019

Nate & Jeremiah By Design is an American reality television series on TLC. It stars Nate Berkus and Jeremiah Brent and premiered on April 8, 2017.

== Premise ==
Nate & Jeremiah By Design follows husbands Nate Berkus and Jeremiah Brent as they help homeowners with renovation disasters, all while juggling married life and raising their daughter, Poppy, and son, Oskar.

In each one-hour episode, Nate and Jeremiah use their extensive interior design backgrounds to assist homeowners who have gone over-budget and over-schedule on home renovation projects and cannot see an end in sight. With budget and the couple's lifestyle in mind, Nate and Jeremiah complete the renovations and transform the home's layout to build a practical and stylish space. They add character and personal touches to each of the refreshed dwellings.

== Production ==
Season 1 premiered on April 8, 2017. Season 2 premiered on April 7, 2018. Season 3 was announced by Nate & Jeremiah on Instagram on January 29, 2019.

Although show was never officially cancelled, it was not renewed after season 3. Nate and Jeremiah have since hosted the HGTV show The Nate and Jeremiah Home Project, which premiered in 2021.

== Episodes ==
=== Series overview ===
| Season | Episodes | Originally released | |
| Season | Episodes | First released | Last released |
|---|---|---|---|
| 1 | 8 | April 8, 2017 | June 3, 2017 |
| 2 | 8 | April 7, 2018 | June 2, 2018 |
| 3 | 8 | April 13, 2019 | June 8, 2019 |

=== Season 1 (2017) ===
| No. overall | No. in season | Title | Original release date | U.S. viewers (millions) |
|---|---|---|---|---|
| 1 | 1 | "Belgian Countryside" | April 8, 2017 | N/A |
| 2 | 2 | "Global Coast" | April 15, 2017 | N/A |
| 3 | 3 | "Classic American" | April 22, 2017 | N/A |
| 4 | 4 | "Modern Southern Charm" | April 29, 2017 | N/A |
| 5 | 5 | "East Meets West" | May 6, 2017 | N/A |
| 6 | 6 | "Happy Hour" | May 13, 2017 | N/A |
| 7 | 7 | "New Traditionalist" | May 20, 2017 | N/A |
| 8 | 8 | "Carrie Bradshaw Meets the Jetsons" | June 3, 2017 | N/A |

=== Season 2 (2018) ===
| No. overall | No. in season | Title | Original release date | U.S. viewers (millions) |
|---|---|---|---|---|
| 9 | 1 | "California Modern" | April 7, 2018 | N/A |
| 10 | 2 | "Tuscan Sunset" | April 14, 2018 | N/A |
| 11 | 3 | "Modern Chalet" | April 21, 2018 | N/A |
| 12 | 4 | "European Farmhouse" | April 28, 2018 | N/A |
| 13 | 5 | "Organic Minimalism" | May 5, 2018 | N/A |
| 14 | 6 | "Home Is Where the Heart Is" | May 12, 2018 | N/A |
| 15 | 7 | "French Mid-Century" | May 19, 2018 | N/A |
| 16 | 8 | "Santa Barbara Easy" | June 2, 2018 | N/A |

=== Season 3 (2019) ===
| No. overall | No. in season | Title | Original release date | U.S. viewers (millions) |
|---|---|---|---|---|
| 17 | 1 | "Luxury Retreat" | April 13, 2019 | N/A |
| 18 | 2 | "Modern Beach Barn" | April 20, 2019 | N/A |
| 19 | 3 | "Modern Traditional" | April 27, 2019 | N/A |
| 20 | 4 | "Well-Travelled" | May 4, 2019 | N/A |
| 21 | 5 | "Relaxed Global" | May 11, 2019 | N/A |
| 22 | 6 | "The New Chalet" | May 18, 2019 | N/A |
| 23 | 7 | "Baby Grand" | June 1, 2019 | N/A |
| 24 | 8 | "Island Breeze" | June 8, 2019 | N/A |
