= The Robert Verdi Show =

- Genre: Reality
- Starring: Robert Verdi
- Country of origin: United States
- Original language: English
- No. of seasons: 1
- No. of episodes: 8 (list of episodes)

Production
- Running time: 60 mins.
- Production company: True Entertainment

Original release
- Network: Logo
- Release: February 10 – April 14, 2010

The Robert Verdi Show is an American reality series that aired from February 10 until April 14, 2010.

== Premise ==
Stylist Robert Verdi tries to balance his professional life with his private life.

== Cast ==
- Robert Verdi

== Episodes ==
No.	Title	Original release date
1	"Robert Wants: Children's Character"	February 10, 2010
Robert and his friends tries to create trendy merchandise items. Robert's assistants help Ana Ortiz with a baby shower.
2	"Robert Wants: Diet Craze"	February 17, 2010
Robert wants to start a diet craze with an all-candy diet featuring a negative-calorie lollipop. Robert styles Ana Ortiz for her interview with Pregnancy Magazine.
3	"Robert Wants: Network"	February 24, 2010
Robert and his team plans a television network, the Robert Verdi Channel. Bethenny Frankel and Robert develop a cooking show for the new network.
4	"Robert Wants: Royal Wedding"	March 3, 2010
Robert begins dating, because he wants a royal wedding. Robert styles Eva Longoria Parker for an event at the Metropolitan Museum of Art.
5	"Robert Wants: Shopping Mall"	March 17, 2010
Robert and his team create a Robert Verdi shopping mall with all his favorite items. Robert donates his clothes to a thrift store.
6	"Robert Wants: Fountain of Youth"	March 24, 2010
Robert and his team develop age reversing products. Robert plans a surprise birthday party for the vice president of his company.
7	"Robert Wants: Award Show"	April 7, 2010
While his team looks for a suitable location and design for Robert's award, Robert hosts the red carpet for the TV Land Award and he styles Kathy Griffin for the GLAAD Award.
6	"Robert Wants: Box Office Gold"	April 14, 2010
Robert's team documents his every move for a documentary. Robert attends the premiere of the musical 9 to 5. Robert and Donatella Versace style Eva Longoria.
