= Secrets of Aspen =

- Genre: Reality
- Created by: Ken Weinstock; Brett Weinstock
- Directed by: Malachi McGlone
- Country of origin: United States
- Original language: English
- No. of seasons: 1
- No. of episodes: 8 (list of episodes)

Production
- Running time: 60 mins.
- Production companies: High Noon Entertainment; VH1 Productions

Original release
- Network: VH1
- Release: January 3 – February 21, 2010

Secrets of Aspen is an American reality television series that aired from January 3 until February 21, 2010.

== Premise ==
Cameras follow six single women who live in the ski resort town of Aspen, Colorado.

== Production ==
The production company used 35 crew members while filming the show, 12 of which were local, and spent $701,000 in the city during the shooting of the series.

== Episodes ==
No.	Title	Original release date
1	"Kickoff Kiss-Off"	January 3, 2010
2	"Fighting in the Streets"	January 10, 2010
3	"Loose Talk"	January 17, 2010
4	"Sold to the Slyest Bidder"	January 24, 2010
5	"Won't Get Fooled Again"	February 14, 2010
6	"Where Laura Goes, Trouble Follows"	February 7, 2010
7	"The Space Between Us"	February 7, 2010
8	"Cubic Zarkonias"	February 21, 2010

== Reception ==
Ant Mitchell of The Michigan Daily wrote "Secrets of Aspen never pretends to be anything but what it is - trash". John Griffiths of Us Weekly called the show "dishy and fast-paced fun".

In January, the show averaged 535,000 viewers while the season finale was watched by 487,000 viewers. Local residents complained about the show to Aspen City Hall and on the Facebook page "Aspen Against VH-1's 'Secrets of Aspen'".
