= Mall Cops: Mall of America =

- Genre: Reality
- Country of origin: United States
- Original language: English
- No. of seasons: 1
- No. of episodes: 12

Production
- Executive producers: Peter Davey; Sheldon Lazarus
- Running time: 22 to 24 minutes
- Production company: September Films

Original release
- Network: TLC
- Release: May 27 – July 8, 2010

Mall Cops: Mall of America is an American reality television series that follows the work of the security team at the Mall of America in Bloomington, Minnesota, one of the largest malls in North America. The series was originally just a special one-hour event, however due to the popularity TLC decided to commission a twelve-part series of half an hour length. The special aired on October 15, 2009 with the series debuting on May 27, 2010. It is produced by September Films, the company behind Bridezillas.

== Format ==
Mall Cops: Mall of America documents the events of a 100-plus team of mall security officers in the biggest mall in America. The Mall Cops help lost kids, track down shoplifters, arrest disorderly guests, and respond to a variety of medical calls. Mall of America boasts more than 500 stores, a theme park, an aquarium and a school.

== Episodes ==
Season	Episodes	Originally released	
Season	Episodes	First released	Last released
1	12	May 27, 2010	July 8, 2010

=== Season 1 (2010) ===
No.	Title	Original release date	Viewers (millions)
0	"Pilot"	October 15, 2009	N/A
1	"Black Friday"	May 27, 2010	1.53
On the busiest day of shopping, the mall cops have to deal with a man carrying a hidden weapon, a girl having a seizure, and a drunk man who refuses to leave the mall voluntarily.
2	"Vikings Fever"	May 27, 2010	1.38
When former Minnesota Vikings players come to the mall, thousands of fans flock the mall to see their idols, however some fans will do anything to see them including starting fights.
3	"Palin Power"	June 3, 2010	N/A
Sarah Palin visits the Mall of America, the mall cops face passionate fans, protesters, a bounty hunter, and a bomb threat all while protecting her.
4	"Twilight"	June 3, 2010	N/A
Teenagers flock to the Mall of America for the premiere of the movie Twilight: New Moon, mall cops try to stop a fight with one person holding a knife, and try to stop drunk man from driving.
5	"Man's Best Friend"	June 10, 2010	N/A
The anti-pet rule is voided for a charity dog walk, a customer feels he is being discriminated against, and a trashcan on fire becomes a threat to mall safety and an argument turns violent.
6	"Double Trouble"	June 10, 2010	N/A
Thousands of people turn out to meet a celebrity chef and author with security stretched to the limit and a possible bomb is discovered after presidential contender Tim Pawlenty arrives.
7	"Storm of the Century"	June 17, 2010	N/A
The Mall of America deals with the possibility of having to close early due to a snowstorm which is predicted to drop 24 inches of snow. The mall cops also face a fight and a fire hazard in the food court.
8	"U.S. Women's Hockey Team"	June 17, 2010	N/A
Hockey fans turn out for the announcement of the U.S. Olympic Women's Hockey Team and mall cops help lost children find their parents, search for stolen cars and stop a serious fight.
9	"No Pants Day"	June 24, 2010	1.53
A group of streakers plan to arrive on trains and then sprint through the Mall of America without wearing any pants. The Director of Security Major Doug Reynolds puts together teams to arrest them.
10	"Lockdown"	July 1, 2010	1.02
Mall Cop Buegler decides to have a mall lockdown drill, after the drill goes badly, she has only a day to find out the problems. Meanwhile Officers must confront a drunk teenager, assist a diabetic man who falls over and look after a child after officers arrested her mother for shoplifting.
11	"R.A.M."	July 8, 2010	N/A
The Mall of America's secret unit, called R.A.M., attempts to train a bomb sniffing dog so it can become a member of the team and after possible terrorist activity R.A.M is sent in high alert status and shuts down the nearby airport.
12	"Fancy Nancy"	July 8, 2010	N/A
After a children's author falls on stage, Mall Cops try to help her. However, with a swarm of people in the crowd, they struggle to get to her. Also, officers try to locate the parents of a child who does not speak English, as well as chase down a shoplifting youth, and assist a man who has suffered a stroke.

== Reception ==
Reviews of the premier of the series were mostly negative, Tom Conroy of Media Life Magazine claimed "At the end of a tired Wednesday, few viewers will be up for a half hour of blandness with a tinge of despair" and Barry Garron of the online site "Hollywood Reporter" said "Making the Mall of America safe for shoppers, one weirdo at a time, isn't as exciting as you might think."
