= Sheri Salata =

American author, speaker and producer (born 1959)

Sheri Salata (born October 20, 1959) is an American author, speaker and producer. She is the former executive producer of The Oprah Winfrey Show, co-president of Oprah Winfrey Network (OWN) and Winfrey’s Harpo Productions.

She was born in Georgia and raised in Waukegan, Illinois. She graduated from the University of Iowa in the early 1980s. Salata's first job in production was as assistant to the Executive producer at Grey Advertising in Chicago. Salata entered Harpo Studios in 1995 as promotions producer.

In 2009 she was named president of Harpo Studios. Salata served as executive producer of The Oprah Winfrey Show from 2006 until the show ended in 2011. She was co-president of OWN with Erik Logan from July 2011 until May 2016.

Salata was introduced to a wider audience in the TV series Season 25: Oprah Behind the Scenes, airing on OWN January–August 2011.

Salata and Nancy Hala are co-hosts of the podcast The Sheri + Nancy Show. In June 2019, Salata published her memoir, The Beautiful No and Other Tales of Trial, Transcendence, and Transformation.
