= Thai Nguyen (fashion designer) =

Vietnamese-American fashion designer

- Born: 1980 (age 45–46); Mỹ Tho, Vietnam
- Education: Fashion Institute of Design & Merchandising
- Occupations: fashion designer, television personality

Thai Nguyen (Vietnamese: Thái Nguyễn; born 1980) is a Vietnamese-American fashion designer and television personality. His atelier is known for its bespoke gowns. He starred as the fashion expert on the Netflix series Say I Do (2020).

== Early life ==
Nguyen was born in Mỹ Tho in the southern Tiền Giang Province of Vietnam. He learned to sew at the age of 9 at his parents' private sewing school. The family immigrated to the United States in 1993 when Thai was 13 where they lived in Washington State. Nguyen graduated from Olympia High School in 1999. He was an officer in the Future Business Leaders of America. Nguyen then moved to California to study at the Fashion Institute of Design & Merchandising.

== Career and personal life ==
Nguyen worked as an associate designer for BCBG Max Azria before launching his own fashion business Thai Nguyen Atelier. During his career, Nguyen's designs have been seen on the red carpet for celebrities including Kristen Bell, Jennifer Lopez, Katy Perry and many others. He specializes in custom design.

In addition to Netflix's 2020 series Say I Do, Nguyen has worked on Bravo's Launch My Line and RuPaul's Drag Race. He was also a judge representing Vietnam on the CBS talent competition World's Best in 2019.

Nguyen is openly gay and has a fiancé.
