= Bill McIntyre (actor) =

American actor

William McIntyre (September 2, 1929 – March 19, 2010) was an American actor, whose credits included roles in Newhart, Dallas and Murphy Brown. He also had a long career in theater, including Off Broadway and in regional productions.

McIntyre was born in Rochester, New York, but raised in Grand Rapids, Michigan. He toured with numerous regional theater companies, including the Guthrie Theater company in Minnesota, Long Wharf Theatre in Connecticut, and the McCarter Theatre of Princeton, New Jersey. He also toured with the national company of The Great White Hope.

His Broadway theater credits included The Secret Affairs of Mildred Wild, opposite actress Maureen Stapleton. McIntyre appeared in The Fantasticks off Broadway.

McIntyre's last public performance was in the New York City production of You Can't Take It with You. He died of natural causes in Englewood, New Jersey, at the age of 80. He had been staying at the Actors Fund Home in Englewood.
