= Carnie Wilson: Unstapled =

American television series

- Genre: Reality
- Starring: Carnie Wilson
- Country of origin: United States
- Original language: English
- No. of seasons: 1
- No. of episodes: 9

Production
- Executive producers: Randy Barbato; Fenton Bailey; Tom Campbell
- Production location: Southern California
- Camera setup: Single-camera
- Production company: World of Wonder

Original release
- Network: Game Show Network
- Release: January 14 – March 11, 2010

Carnie Wilson: Unstapled is an American reality television show, starring game show hostess and singer Carnie Wilson. The show aired on Game Show Network (GSN) from January 14, 2010, to March 11, 2010. Filmed in southern California and produced by World of Wonder, the series chronicles the life of Wilson, host of GSN's The Newlywed Game, as she strives to lose excessive weight gained over the past decade. Wilson had a public fall out with the network after the series was broadcast and was criticized after gaining weight while on a diet featured on the show.

== Format ==
The series focuses on the life of Carnie Wilson, daughter of Brian Wilson, founder of the Beach Boys. The show takes place at Wilson's residence in the Los Angeles area, and viewers see some of the struggles as she attempts to lose about 50 pounds after giving birth to her second child. The series also depicts Wilson's attempt to balance her life as a game show hostess, entertainer, wife, and mother of two daughters.

Former wrestler Diamond Dallas Page, Wilson's personal trainer and fitness guru, makes frequent appearances on the show. The "Unstapled" part of the show's title is a reference to Wilson's 1999 gastric bypass surgery. By 2001, Wilson had lost 150 pounds, though she had regained much of it back by 2010, when the show was being filmed.

Wilson's diet program is featured on the show. She became a paid spokesperson for The Fresh Diet while on the show, and there was a controversy when Wilson gained weight while on that diet in 2010.

== Production ==
The series was green-lit in a Game Show Network (GSN) press release delivered on October 21, 2009. Executive producers included Randy Barbato, Fenton Bailey and Tom Campbell, while World of Wonder was the show's production company. The show premiered on January 14, 2010. While the network has been known for traditional game shows, Kelly Goode, the network's senior vice president for original programming and development, argued that the show made sense given viewers' positive response to Wilson on The Newlywed Game. Wilson expressed excitement at the prospect of the show, saying, "It's a great message to send out for women, that we can multi-task, we can be a present mom and a present wife and try to keep our sanity."

In July 2010, Wilson sued GSN, claiming she was owed $277,500 in extra pay for doing the show. GSN, meanwhile, argued that Wilson failed to make scheduled appearances The Dr. Oz Show, Access Hollywood, and The Wendy Williams Show to promote the series. The two parties settled their dispute in 2012.

== Episodes ==
No.	Title	Original release date	Production code
1	"Episode 1"	January 14, 2010	01-001
2	"Episode 2"	January 21, 2010	01-002
3	"Episode 3"	January 28, 2010	01-003
4	"Episode 4"	February 4, 2010	01-004
5	"Episode 5"	February 11, 2010	01-005
6	"Episode 6"	February 18, 2010	01-006
7	"Episode 7"	February 25, 2010	01-007
8	"Episode 8"	March 4, 2010	01-008
9	"Episode 9"	March 11, 2010	01-009

== Reception ==
In a series preview CNN's James Dinan argued that GSN would be better off focusing on traditional game shows in order for the network to avoid "losing its niche": "Perhaps GSN will learn that lesson and stay true to its original calling when this experiment comes to an end. Then again, I could see it following the leader and become [sic] just another channel." Annie Barrett of Entertainment Weekly added, "The only way I'd watch...is if it were an animated tragicomedy series based on the Operation! board game."

Boston.com's Matthew Gilbert argued that Wilson "[did] not come across well" and that the series was a "showcase for the kind of reality drama queenery that is becoming increasingly hard to bear." A reviewer for Hollywood Junket was pleased with the series, writing, "The scenes are nicely tied-in with interviews of Wilson talking about her thoughts on her life's daily events as she speaks straight to the camera directly to viewers at home," and adding that provided the show preserved "naturalness," it was "sure to do well." Despite expressing early optimism about the series, Wilson was unhappy after taping the show, saying, "[The producers] wanted me to get on the scale every day, and I didn't want to. I don't want to be known as the weight loss girl — that's not who I am. I'm also a singer, actress, mother and author."
