= Solving History with Olly Steeds =

- Also known as: Mystery Investigator with Olly Steeds (UK and Ireland)
- Genre: Reality, History
- Presented by: Oliver Steeds
- Starring: Oliver Steeds
- Composer: Jim DiSpirito
- Country of origin: United States
- Original language: English
- No. of seasons: 1
- No. of episodes: 8

Production
- Cinematography: Hossam Aboul-Magd
- Camera setup: Multiple
- Running time: 45 minutes
- Production company: JWM Productions

Original release
- Network: Discovery Channel
- Release: January 13 – May 13, 2010

Solving History with Olly Steeds is a weekly American documentary adventure reality television series that premiered on January 13, 2010, on the Discovery Channel. Produced by JWM Productions, the program follows British explorer and investigative journalist Oliver Steeds as he travels around the world investigating historical claims and theories.

== Episodes ==
=== Season 1 (2010) ===
No.	Title	Original release date
1	"Ark of the Covenant"	January 13, 2010
The Ark of the Covenant, the alleged casket that holds the remnants of the Ten Commandments, has been missing for over 2500 years. Olly's first mission in this new series has him on a quest to prove that the famous chest still exists and to see if there is any validity to the claim that it is in the possession of the Ethiopian Orthodox Tewahedo Church.
2	"Nazca Lines"	January 20, 2010
Since their discovery about 100 years ago, the Nazca Lines in Peru have been a sight of fascination. Olly attempts to find out why a people that lived a few thousand years ago would build such a large imprint that can only be seen from the air. Some suggest it is alien related, while others say they were constructed for their gods. Olly voices intense frustration about the bureaucratic red tape that blocks many from researching Nazca culture.
3	"Lost City of Gold"	January 27, 2010
Olly treks through the remains of the once mighty Inca Empire to find the Lost City of Gold, also known as El Dorado.
4	"Atlantis"	February 3, 2010
Olly explores the depths of the Mediterranean to find new evidence that could explain the mystery of what really happened to the fabled city of Atlantis.
5	"Nazi Treasure"	February 17, 2010
The Amber Room is considered by many to be the most valuable piece of looted art in the world. Stolen by the Nazis in 1941, it is believed that Hitler's army hid it in Eastern Europe. Steeds takes on the case and begins his quest in Kaliningrad and then travels through Nazi hideouts across Europe to piece together clues that narrow down the final hiding place of this treasure. From an underground German fortress, into secret Czech mine-shafts, and by drilling deep beneath a medieval castle used by the SS, Olly uncovers exciting new evidence that could lead once and for all to the discovery of the Amber Room.
6	"Hitler's Mummies"	February 24, 2010
Olly Steeds's quest takes him to the Canary Islands off the coast of Africa in search of mythical blond-haired mummies and to a secret crypt the Nazis thought was the center of the world. In the marshes of northern Europe, he examines ancient bog bodies that the Nazis used to justify their doctrines. Things get personal for Olly as he meets a true believer of Nazi philosophy and decides to use his own DNA to test Hitler's theories on racial superiority.
7	"Devil's Island"	March 23, 2010
Olly travels to the infamous Devil's Island penal colony in French Guiana and researches its tales of escapees.
8	"The Legends of Robin Hood"	May 13, 2010
Olly Steeds heads to Sherwood Forest in his home country of England to research the legends of Robin Hood by living them himself to show what it really meant to live as an outlaw in Plantagenet England.

== International broadcasts ==
The show airs in the United Kingdom and Ireland under the title Mystery Investigator with Olly Steeds, which premiered on May 24, 2010, on Discovery Knowledge. The show is also a huge hit in Asian market, with host Olly Steeds making several invited promotional appearances.

== Reception ==
Common Sense Media gave the show 3 out of 5 stars.

== See also ==
- Mark & Olly: Living with the Tribes
