= Addicted (TV series) =

- Country of origin: United States
- Original language: English
- No. of seasons: 2
- No. of episodes: 14

Production
- Production location: United States
- Running time: 60 minutes
- Production company: Asylum Entertainment

Original release
- Network: TLC (season 1); Discovery Fit & Health (season 2)
- Release: March 17, 2010 – August 28, 2012

Addicted, which is officially trademarked as addicted, is an American reality television series that follows the lives of individuals who are struggling with addiction as they work with interventionist Kristina Wandzilak. The series premiered on TLC on March 17, 2010. Addicted returned with a second season on August 28, 2012 on Discovery Fit & Health (now Discovery Life), and has also aired on TLC.

== Episodes ==
=== Season 1 ===
No.	Title	Original release date
1	"Amanda"	March 17, 2010
2	"Klea"	March 24, 2010
3	"Niko"	March 31, 2010
4	"Alissa"	April 7, 2010
5	"Jeremy"	April 14, 2010
6	"Annie & Michael"	April 21, 2010

=== Season 2 ===
No.	Title	Original release date
1	"Megan"	August 28, 2012
2	"Josh"	September 4, 2012
3	"Aaron"	September 11, 2012
4	"Lindsay"	September 18, 2012
5	"Jason"	September 25, 2012
6	"Phil"	October 2, 2012
7	"Theresa"	October 9, 2012
8	"Gina and Sean"	October 16, 2012
