= Changing Lanes (TV series) =

2010 American reality TV series

- Genre: Reality
- Starring: Jonathan Smith; Michael Cherry; Ludacris
- Country of origin: United States
- Original language: English
- No. of seasons: 1
- No. of episodes: 8 (list of episodes)

Production
- Executive producers: Ken Mok; Jim Jorden; Jay Abraham; Max Siegel
- Running time: 60 mins.
- Production company: 10 by 10 Entertainment

Original release
- Network: BET
- Release: September 1 – October 20, 2010

Changing Lanes is an American reality television series that aired from September 10 until October 20, 2010.

== Premise ==
Women and minorities compete for a spot on a NASCAR team.

== Cast ==
- Jonathan Smith as co-host
- Michael Cherry as co-host
- Ludacris as narrator

== Episodes ==
No.	Title	Original release date
1	"The Journey Begins"	September 1, 2010
2	"Who Will Be in the top 10?"	September 8, 2010
3	"Back to Basics"	September 15, 2010
4	"First Elimination"	September 22, 2010
5	"Competition Heats Up"	September 29, 2010
6	"Pit Crew Training"	October 6, 2010
7	"Who Will Be in the Final Four?"	October 13, 2010
8	"The Showdown"	October 20, 2010
