= Fantasia for Real =

- Genre: Documentary
- Starring: Fantasia Barrino
- Country of origin: United States
- Original language: English
- No. of seasons: 2
- No. of episodes: 20

Production
- Executive producers: Fenton Bailey; Jeff Olde; Jeremy Simmons; Jill Holmes; Kristen Kelly; Randy Barbato; Tom Campbell
- Running time: 21 to 23 minutes
- Production company: World of Wonder Productions

Original release
- Network: VH1
- Release: January 11 – November 28, 2010

Fantasia for Real is an American reality documentary television series on VH1 that debuted on January 11, 2010. The series chronicles American Idol season 3 winner Fantasia Barrino, along with her family, and her struggle to regain control of both her career and personal life.

== Cast ==
- Fantasia Barrino
- Brian Dickens - Fantasia's manager
- Addie "Aunt Bunny" Washington - Fantasia's aunt
- Diane Barrino-Barber - Fantasia's mother
- Zion Barrino - Fantasia's daughter
- Joseph "Teeny" Barrino, Kassim "Ricco" Barrino and Xavier Barrino - Fantasia's brothers
- Addie Collins - Fantasia's grandmother

== Episodes ==
=== Season 1 (2010) ===
| No. overall | No. in season | Title | Original release date |
|---|---|---|---|
| 1 | 1 | "No More Freebies" | January 11, 2010 |
| 2 | 2 | "Tough Love" | January 18, 2010 |
| 3 | 3 | "The Breakdown" | January 25, 2010 |
| 4 | 4 | "Come Together" | February 1, 2010 |
| 5 | 5 | "The Barrinos are Back... Or are They?" | February 15, 2010 |
| 6 | 6 | "The Re-Education of Fantasia" | February 22, 2010 |
| 7 | 7 | "The Re-Invention of Fantasia" | March 1, 2010 |
| 8 | 8 | "Fantasia 2.0" | March 8, 2010 |
| 9 | 9 | "Clip Show" | March 8, 2010 |

=== Season 2 (2010) ===
| No. overall | No. in season | Title | Original release date | U.S. viewers (millions) |
|---|---|---|---|---|
| 10 | 1 | "London Calling" | September 19, 2010 | 1.14 |
| 11 | 2 | "Baby Steps" | September 26, 2010 | 0.80 |
| 12 | 3 | "Eye Candy" | October 3, 2010 | 0.65 |
| 13 | 4 | "Happy Birthday To Me" | October 10, 2010 | 0.81 |
| 14 | 5 | "The Rumors Are True" | October 17, 2010 | 0.62 |
| 15 | 6 | "Get Suited Up For War" | October 24, 2010 | 0.64 |
| 16 | 7 | "Breakdown" | October 31, 2010 | 0.98 |
| 17 | 8 | "Back To Me" | November 7, 2010 | 0.45 |
| 18 | 9 | "What Happens in Vegas..." | November 14, 2010 | 0.60 |
| 19 | 10 | "Going Hollywood" | November 21, 2010 | 0.54 |
| 20 | 11 | "Lean On Me" | November 28, 2010 | 0.71 |
