= FYI =

Abbreviation of "For Your information"

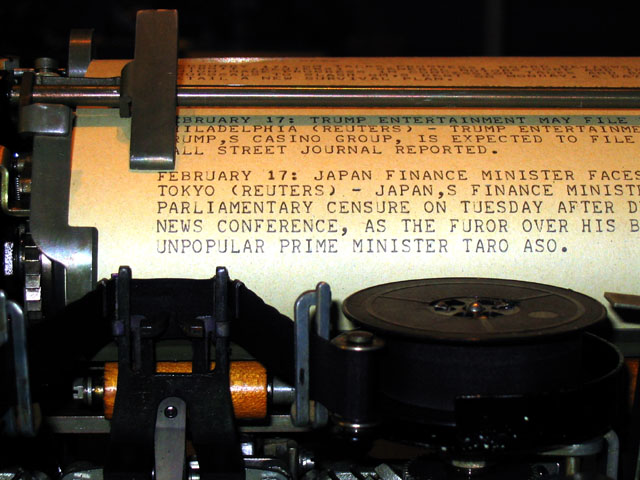
Old Typewriter

The term "FYI" is a common abbreviation of the phrase "for your information". Originally a wire service abbreviation used by journalists, it is now commonly used in emails, instant messaging and other messages to quote an informational message or explanatory statement that does not suggest any reaction or require a response; as a statement to provide additional context. The abbreviation can introduce an announcement, accompany a forwarded document or provide additional information about a subject already under discussion. Both uppercase FYI and lowercase fyi are recorded in dictionaries.

Use of "FYI" has been implemented since 1915, as "just a small part of things that saves space on a telegraph message" (charged by the word). It has a history in journalism and wire-service communication. The same expression also supplied the name of the For Your Information subseries of Request for Comments (RFC) documents, which provided explanatory material for Internet users between 1990 and 2011.

Among Internet Standards, FYIs are a subset of the Request for Comments (RFC) series. The FYI series of notes is created to provide Internet users with a central repository of information about categories related to the website. FYI topics may consist of historical memos on "why it was created that way" to answers too easy asked operational questions.
