= Barry Berkus =

American architect, author and art collector

- Born: November 25, 1935; Los Angeles, California, U.S.
- Died: November 30, 2012 (aged 77); Santa Barbara, California, U.S.
- Education: John Muir High School; University of California, Santa Barbara; USC School of Architecture
- Occupation: Architect
- Spouses: Gail Hanks; Jo Cahow
- Children: 2 sons, 1 daughter

Barry Berkus (November 25, 1935 – November 30, 2012) was an American architect, author and art collector. He designed more than 600,000 houses. He also helped write building codes and develop new towns in Japan.

== Early life ==
Berkus was born on November 25, 1935, in Los Angeles, California. He was educated at the John Muir High School in Pasadena. He went to college at the University of California, Santa Barbara and graduated from the School of Architecture at the University of Southern California.

== Career ==
Berkus established an architectural firm in Santa Barbara in the 1970s. He eventually "employed more than 200 architects", with offices in San Francisco, New York, Chicago, Washington, Atlanta, Miami, Tokyo, and Kuala Lumpur.

Berkus was primarily an "architect of mass market housing." His work included "resort and master-planned communities, urban infill, commercial and institutional projects, and custom homes." He founded two design firms, B3 Architects and Berkus Design Studio, both based in Santa Barbara, with offices across the nation and world.

Berkus got his start in 1956 as an intern for the late William F. Cody, a prominent Palm Springs architect. Under Cody’s tutelage, he assimilated the principles of Modernism. Later on, after starting his own practice, Berkus put his unique signature on virtually every type of new-home design.

A pivotal project for Berkus was Park Imperial South in Palm Springs, Calif. During a celebration of the community’s 50th anniversary in February 2011, Berkus remarked, “[Park Imperial South] opened up a way of looking at living space that still informs my designs. It inspired a preference for light, flexible room definitions, and a fluid connection with the outdoors.” He also was the architect of record of Deep Well Ranch homes and condominiums in Palm Springs, California.

Berkus was recognized numerous times over the years for his contributions to the home-building industry and residential design. He won hundreds of design and planning awards during his career. The editors of Professional Builder named him the most innovative architect in U.S. housing and one of the most influential people in home building in the past 75 years. "Upon graduation from the University of Miami School of Architecture, I had the opportunity to open an office for Barry in Miami. These are the years that I have always referred to as the ‘University of Berkus Graduate School.’ No one could have served as a better mentor and friend to me. He was always just a phone call away. His insights into the industry have saved me numerous times over; I am still in business because of the advice he has given me over the years. I will never measure up to the creative force and business acumen of Barry Berkus, but he set the bar for which we all strive. The world has lost an amazing architect, a great creative mind, a true friend, an insightful mentor, and a remarkable human being. I am so very blessed and thankful that our paths crossed so many years ago. He will be greatly missed," said architect Don Evans, The Evans Group, Orlando.

"Barry’s fame and accomplishments as architect/planner, good citizen, and Renaissance man are well catalogued and the accolades are well deserved. Yet what many will point to is his enthusiasm for making things better, and his gift for inspiration. He made us feel like the special, talented ones, the ones who would do great things. He was an exceptional mentor and true friend, and we will carry that spirit forward. Barry would like that," said Rebecca Hardin, president of Open Line Public Relations, Santa Barbara, who worked for Berkus for five years. Over the course of his career, he designed over 600,000 houses. Outside the United States, Berkus was involved in the urban planning of residential areas in Malaysia and housing structures in Disneyland Paris. He also redeveloped the waterfront in Vancouver, Canada. In Japan, he helped write new building codes and develop new towns. Berkus authored several books about architecture.

Berkus was also an art collector. He collected art by David Hockney, Roy Lichtenstein, Robert Rauschenberg, James Rosenquist, Frank Stella, and Andy Warhol.

== Personal life and death ==
Berkus was married twice. He was married to Gail Hanks from 1957 until her death in 2000. Berkus remarried in 2005 to Jo Cahow and they remained together from 2005 until his death. He had two sons, Jeffrey and Steven, and a daughter, Carey.

Berkus died on November 30, 2012, in Santa Barbara, California, at age 77.

== Selected works ==
- Berkus, Barry (2000). Architecture, Art, Parallels, Connections. Mulgrave, Australia: Images Publishing Group. ISBN 9781864700848. OCLC 46370749.
- Berkus, Barry (2002). Sculpting Space: House Design. Mulgrave, Australia: Images Publishing Group. ISBN 9781864700886. OCLC 51762749.
