= The Nate Berkus Show =

American syndicated talk show (2010–2012)

- Also known as: The Nate Show
- Genre: Talk show
- Presented by: Nate Berkus
- Country of origin: United States
- Original language: English
- No. of seasons: 2
- No. of episodes: 291

Production
- Executive producers: Oprah Winfrey; Terry Murphy; Corin Nelson
- Camera setup: Multiple-camera
- Running time: 42 minutes
- Production companies: Nate Berkus Entertainment; Curly One Productions; Harpo Studios; Sony Pictures Television

Original release
- Network: Syndication
- Release: September 13, 2010 – May 24, 2012

Related
- The Oprah Winfrey Show

The Nate Berkus Show, also known as The Nate Show, is an American talk show that premiered on September 13, 2010, hosted by interior designer Nate Berkus. The series aired on syndication during its original run from September 13, 2010, to May 24, 2012. The Nate Berkus Show is a spin-off of The Oprah Winfrey Show.

In September 2012, the Oprah Winfrey Network purchased the cable rights to The Nate Berkus Show, along with the first five seasons of Rachael Ray.

== Production ==
The show was co-produced by Harpo Productions and Sony Pictures Television. It is taped in 1080i (HDTV) in Studio 42 at the CBS Broadcast Center in New York. The series was distributed by Sony Pictures Television, after Sony and NBCUniversal made agreements to launch the show on all 10 NBC owned and operated stations, as well as Harpo Productions.

The show's premiere came in response to the cancellation of The Bonnie Hunt Show, which was not renewed for the 2010–11 television season. As a result, most NBC stations were having trouble finding daytime programming. Broadcasting & Cable reported that NBC syndicated daytime programming, aside from The Ellen DeGeneres Show, "have been largely out of the daytime game, primarily because of low to lukewarm ratings for Bonnie Hunt's show.

In early 2011, Berkus hosted sex therapist Ruth Westheimer on his show, after redoing the living room and dining room of her Manhattan apartment to reduce clutter. She had lived in the apartment for 50 years.

On December 9, 2011, it was announced that the show, which NBC had given a two-year commitment to air, would end after its second season. It remained in production and delivered all scheduled original episodes. The show officially ended on May 24, 2012, with reruns airing through August 31, 2012.

== Ratings ==
When the show debuted, The Nate Berkus Show had a 1.1 rating, which was the highest rating for a new daytime talk show during the 2010–11 television season. although the rating showed only half of what the ratings for Dr. Oz was. The ratings stayed stagnant for the entire two-year run, never averaging more than a 1.1, and the Hollywood Reporter stated that Berkus's program ranked #126 in all of syndication at the time of its cancellation.
