= Dave Berkus =

American venture capitalist

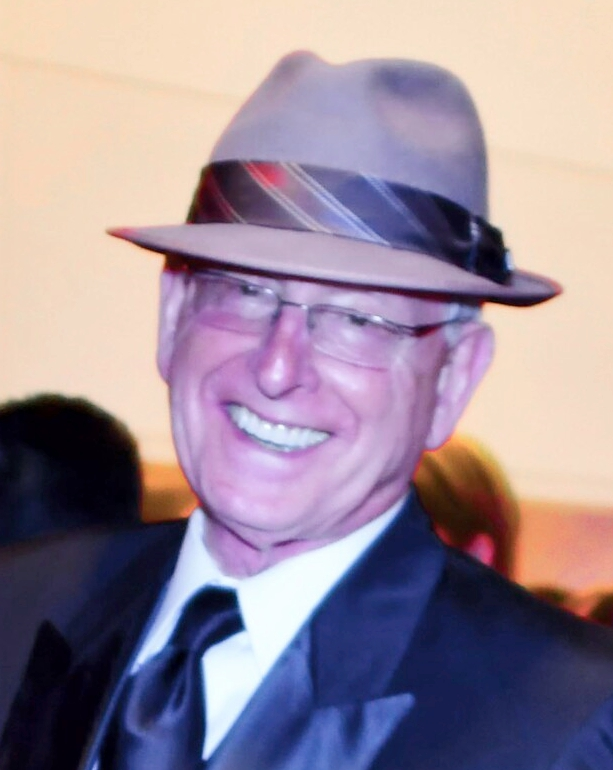
- Born: David W. Berkus; 23 March, 1941; Pasadena, California
- Education: Occidental College, (B.A., Business Administration, 1962)
- Occupations: Angel investor, venture capitalist
- Website: berkus.com

David W. Berkus (born March 23, 1941) is an American angel investor and venture capitalist from California. He is credited with technological innovations in computer software for the hotel and lodging industries and was recognized by that industry's Hospitality Financial Technology Professionals association with its International Hall of Fame designation. Inc. Magazine described him as a "super angel" in 1996.

He attended Occidental College in Eagle Rock, California, graduating in 1962. He then served in the United States Naval Reserve for nearly a decade while simultaneously managing his first enterprise, a phonograph record production and manufacturing company, which he created at the age of 15. He is responsible for leading companies as CEO, chairman or lead director. He was awarded "Director of the Year" for his board leadership efforts with over 40 companies over the years.

He has formed, managed and sold businesses in the hospitality, entertainment and software industries. He specifically deals with business operations and venture investing and serves on a number of corporate boards.

== Early years ==
In 1957, Berkus founded his first company, Custom Fidelity, Inc., whose purpose was to produce and manufacture phonograph records. In 1971 he managed this company to its initial public offering (IPO) under SEC Regulation "A," which pertains to small businesses. In 1968 he relocated the company from Pasadena to Hollywood. By 1974, the company employed over fifty people under its record manufacturing operation and other related divisions, and he sold his interest in the business.

During his time at Occidental College, Berkus held the position of editor for the Occidental Weekly, as well as president of Kappa Sigma fraternity. In his senior year he received the Wall Street Journal Award for his accomplishments in the study of economics. In 1962, he graduated from Occidental College with a Bachelor of Arts degree in Business Administration.

Berkus then served in the United States Naval Reserve from 1963 to 1967, serving as an aircrewman aboard P2 aircraft. He reached the level of E5, and then was awarded a direct commission in the United States Naval Reserve as an Air Intelligence Officer from 1967 to 1972, reaching the level of O3, while still managing Custom Fidelity Inc.

Having programmed an early minicomputer for the record company in his spare time, he found a market for the programs by creating the earliest forms of packaged software. He sold his interest in the record company, and founded Berkus Compusystems Inc., in 1974 to market the computer software he had written. One of the several hundred early customers was a local hotel, the Miramar Sheraton, whose owner asked him to write software for reservations and front office operations. From that request, Berkus turned his attention to the hotel industry that had little previous automation in its past, and formed Computerized Lodging Systems Inc., in 1981. Through his work in these two companies, he helped to shape the minicomputer software industry, being recognized by the Inc. 500 list of America's fasting-growing companies in 1987 and 1988. His company held 16% of the world market share for hotel automation systems. He sold Computerized Lodging Systems to MAI Systems, Inc. in 1990 and continued to operate the company as a subsidiary until 1993, when he left to form Berkus Technology Ventures. His achievements were recognized by his induction into the highly exclusive (49 members as of 2021) Hospitality (HFTP) "International Hall of Fame" in 1998. As of January 2020, Marriott Hotels still used the computer software he wrote in 2,200 hotels, under the internal name, FOSSE.

== Venture capital and corporate development ==
While Berkus often serves as chief financial officer of several of his early stage companies, his primary focus has been as a managing partner or managing director of six early stage investment funds, including Kodiak Ventures, LP, Berkus Technology Ventures, LLC., three funds managed for the Tech Coast Angels of Southern California, and Wayfare Ventures, LLC.

Berkus is current or recent Board Chairman or board member for numerous public and private technology companies, and has been active in a total of over forty private and public companies.

He has made 206 investments in early stage ventures, often known as angel investing, for which he has an IRR of 102%, which includes capital contributions to his various funds (see above). He is also Chairman Emeritus of the Tech Coast Angels.

== Philanthropy ==
Berkus is an emeritus trustee of Occidental College (1996-2025) and was a driving force in developing its newest and largest dormitory, a 274-bed hall which was originally named Rangeview Hall. In 2013 the dormitory was renamed Berkus Hall in recognition of a $5 million gift from Berkus and his wife and children. A second residence for senior women at Occidental College was named Berkus House in honor of a previous donation to the college.

== Affiliations ==
In recognition for adding significant shareholder value for emerging technology companies, he was named "Director of the Year-Early Stage Businesses" by the Forum for Corporate Directors of Orange County, California, and Technology Leader of the Year by the Los Angeles County Board of Supervisors.

== Authored works ==
- Berkus, D., & Kelley, B. (1994), Better Than Money!, Santa Barbara, CA: Synergy Press.
- Berkus, D. (2006), Extending the Runway, New York, NY: Aspatore Press.
- Berkus, D. (2012), Basic Berkonomics, Los Angeles, CA: Berkus Press.
- Berkus, D. (2009), Berkonomics, Los Angeles, CA: Berkus Press.
- Berkus, D. (2011), Advanced Berkonomics, Los Angeles, CA: Berkus Press.
- Berkus, D. (2013), Small Business Success Collection: Resources for entrepreneurs, investors and corporate boards (Vols. 1–8), Los Angeles, CA: Berkus Press (resources for entrepreneurs, investors and corporate boards).
- Berkus, D. (2014), Small Business Success Collection: Resources for entrepreneurs, investors and corporate boards (Vols. 1–8), (2nd Ed.), Los Angeles, CA: Berkus Press.
- Berkus, D. (2014), Extending the Runway, (2nd Ed.), Los Angeles, CA: Berkus Press
- Berkus, D., & Shepherd, K. (2015), Get Scrappy, Los Angeles, CA: Berkus Press
- Berkus, D. (2026), The Leader's Toolkit, Los Angeles, CA: Berkus Press
