= Gallo (surname) =

Gallo is a surname of Italian origin.

== Geographical distribution ==
As of 2014, 36.1% of all known bearers of the surname "Gallo" were residents of Italy (frequency 1:680), 11.8% of Argentina (1:1,451), 11.7% of the United States (1:12,385), 7.1% of Colombia (1:2,691), 5.9% of the Philippines (1:6,855), 5.6% of Brazil (1:14,574), 3.0% of Mexico (1:16,388), 2.6% of Peru (1:4,966), 2.2% of Spain (1:8,604), 2.0% of Ecuador (1:3,181), 2.0% of France (1:13,504) and 1.0% of Uruguay (1:1,357).

In Italy, the frequency of the surname was higher than the national average (1:680) in the following regions:

1. Piedmont (1:207)
2. Calabria (1:224)
3. Campania (1:326)
4. Liguria (1:491)
5. Molise (1:650)

In Spain, the frequency of the surname was higher than the national average (1:8,604) in the following autonomous communities:

1. Cantabria (1:2,082)
2. Basque Country (1:3,083)
3. Castile and León (1:3,095)
4. La Rioja (1:4,814)
5. Asturias (1:5,193)
6. Navarre (1:5,218)
7. Community of Madrid (1:6,287)

In Argentina, the frequency of the surname was higher than the national average (1:1,451) in the following provinces:

1. Santiago del Estero Province (1:375)
2. Córdoba Province (1:1,213)
3. Buenos Aires Province (1:1,234)
4. Santa Fe Province (1:1,238)
5. Salta Province (1:1,254)
6. La Pampa Province (1:1,262)
7. Tucumán Province (1:1,263)

== People with the surname ==
- Agostino Gallo (1499–1570), Italian agronomist
- Andrea Gallo (1928–2013), Italian Roman Catholic priest
- Anna Maria Gallo (1715–1791), better known as Mary Frances of the Five Wounds of Jesus, Italian saint
- Albert Gallo aka Albert "Kid Blast" Gallo Jr. (born June 6, 1930), gangster in the Genovese crime family of New York City, brother of Joe Gallo
- Anthony Gallo (born 1965), American guitarist
- Armando Gallo (born 1944), Italian journalist and photographer
- Bill Gallo (1922–2011), cartoonist and columnist for the New York Daily News
- Carla Gallo (born 1975), American actress
- Dean Gallo (1935–1994), American congressman and businessman
- Diego Gallo (born 1982), Uruguayan swimmer
- Domenico Gallo (1730–c. 1768), Italian composer and violinist whose works are sometimes mistakenly attributed to Pergolesi.
- Ernest Gallo (1909–2007), American businessman, co-founder of E & J Gallo Winery
- Fortune Gallo (1878–1970), Italian-born American impresario of the San Carlo Opera Company
- George Gallo (born 1956), American film director, screenwriter & producer, known for writing Midnight Run
- Inigo Gallo (1932–2000), Swiss actor, radio personality, and playwright
- Joe Gallo aka Crazy Joe (1929–1972), gangster in the Colombo crime family of New York City, brother of Albert Gallo
- Joey Gallo (born 1993), American professional baseball player
- Joseph Edward Gallo (1919–2007), American businessman, owner of cheese producer Joseph Gallo Farms, brother of Ernest Gallo and Julio Gallo
- Joseph N. Gallo (1912–1995), gangster and consigliere in the Gambino crime family of New York City
- Julio Gallo (1910–1993), American businessman, co-founder of E & J Gallo Winery
- Marcia Gallo (born c. 1951), American historian and author
- Marco Gallo (born 2001), Filipino-Italian actor
- Marielle Gallo (born 1949), French politician, Member of the European Parliament
- Mario Gallo (actor) (1923–1984), American film & television actor
- Mario Gallo (director) (1878–1945), Italian-born Argentine film director
- Max Gallo (1932–2017), French writer, historian, and politician, known for a series of novels based on the life of Napoleon
- Melissa Fumero née Gallo (born 1982), American actress
- Michele Gallo (born 2001), Italian fencer
- Nunzio Gallo (1928–2008), Italian singer
- Pilar Cisneros Gallo (born 1954), Peruvian-Costa Rican journalist and politician
- River Gallo (born 1990 or 1991), Salvadoran-American filmmaker, actor, model, and intersex rights activist
- Robert Gallo (born 1937), American biomedical researcher, famous for the co-discovery of the HIV virus
- Ron Gallo (born 1992), American musician
- Samuel Sarfati known as Gallo (died 1519), physician to Pope Julius II
- Vincent Gallo (born 1961), American actor, director, writer, and producer

== Fictional characters with the surname ==
- Boss Gallo, in the video game Star Wars: Galactic Battlegrounds
- Cabe Gallo, character in the American TV series Scorpion
- Cordelia Gallo, character in the Japanese light novel series Gosick
- Leland Gallo, character in the American TV series Valor

== See also ==
- Gallo (winery), an enterprise founded by Ernest and Julio Gallo in 1933
