= Fossano =

Fossano Fossan
- Comune
- Città di Fossano
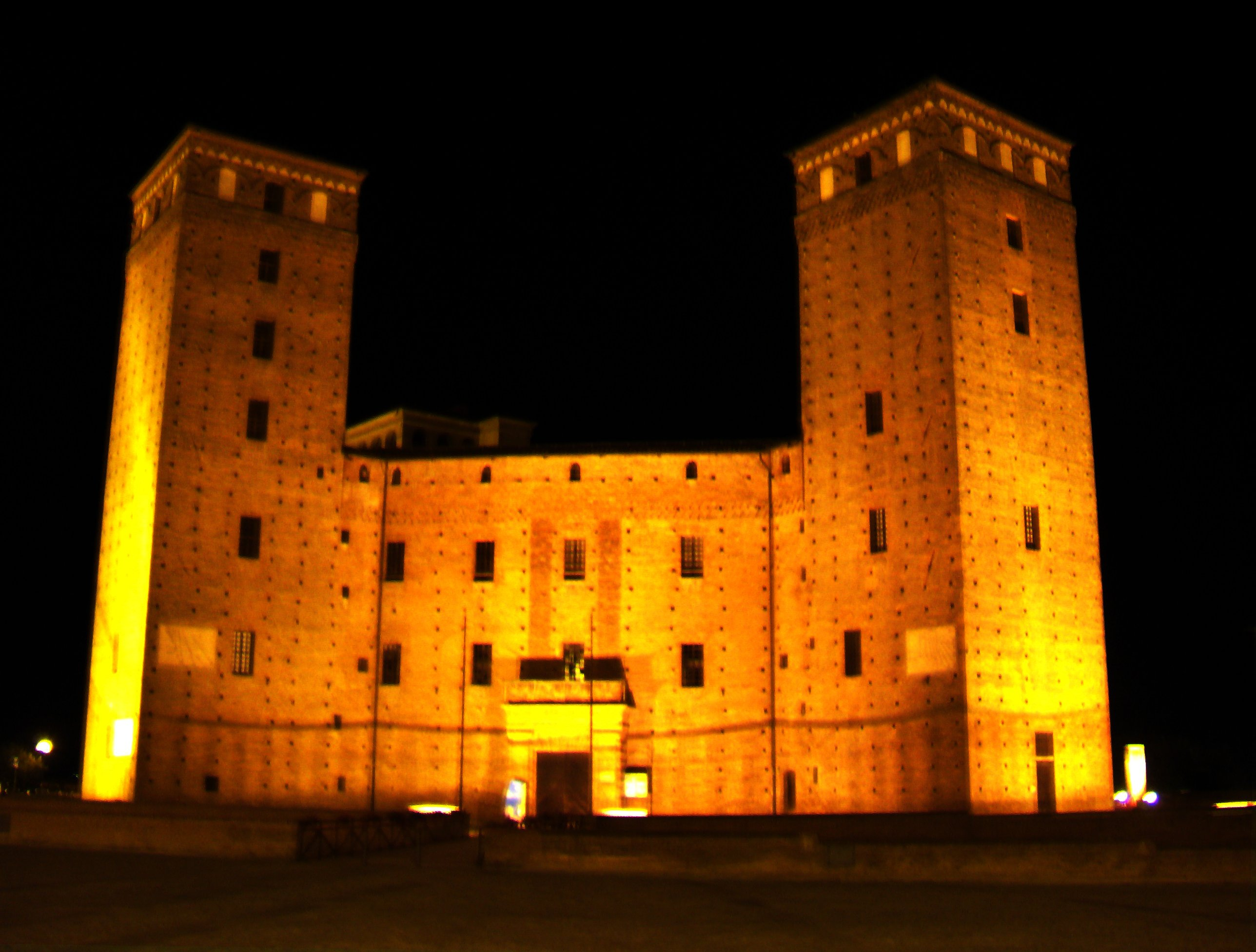
- Fossano Castle

- Coat of arms

- Location within Italy Location within Piedmont
- Coordinates: 44°33′N 07°44′E
- Country: Italy
- Region: Piedmont
- Province: Cuneo (CN)
- Frazioni: Gerbo, Maddalene, Murazzo, Piovani, San Sebastiano, San Vittore, Tagliata, Acqua Sana, Bastita, Belmonte, Boschetti, Crocetta, Cussanio, Frola, Giardina, Loreto, Mellea, Mimeri, Roata Piozzi, San Lorenzo, San Martino, Santa Lucia, Santa Marta, Tallone

Government
  - Mayor: Dario Tallone (Far Right Coalition)

Area
  - Total: 130.14 km^{2} (50.25 sq mi)
- Elevation: 375 m (1,230 ft)

Population (1-1-2021)
  - Total: 24,486
  - Density: 188.15/km^{2} (487.31/sq mi)
- Demonym: Fossanese(i)
- Time zone: UTC+1 (CET)
  - Summer (DST): UTC+2 (CEST)
- Postal code: 12045
- Dialing code: 0172
- Patron saint: Juvenal of Narni
- Saint day: First Sunday of May
- Website: Official website

Fossano (Piedmontese: Fossan) is a town and comune of Piedmont, Northern Italy. It is the fourth largest town of the province of Cuneo, after Cuneo, Alba and Bra.

It lies on the main railway line from Turin to Cuneo and to Savona, and has a branch line to Mondovì.

Chief industries of the town include confectionery (with Italian industries Balocco and Maina), chemicals, metallurgy, and textiles.

== History ==
Fossano appeared as a commune in 1236, founded by a Guelph league of cities, but in 1251 had to yield to Asti. In 1304 it was acquired by the Marquisate of Saluzzo. It finally surrendered in 1314 to Filippo d'Acaia, whose successor handed it over to the House of Savoy.

=== Etymology ===
The name Fossano could be the transformation of the name locus or fundus faucianus, from the Roman first name Faucius, or derive from the word fossato (ditch), in Piedmontese fossà, from which fossan (inhabitant of the ditch). The sinkings are in fact characteristic of the hill on which the first city village rose. Historians agree speaking about "great ditch of the Chiotto" in dialect Ciot, hole or pit. An alternative hypothesis is that the name comes from the Latin fons sana (healthy spring), to indicate the presence in of a potable water spring.

== Main sights ==
=== Old town ===
The old section of Fossano lies in the high part of the town. It is divided in two borghi (ancient quarters): Borgo Piazza (Square Quarter), developed in the 15th through 18th centuries, and Borgo Vecchio (Old Quarter), dating from the Middle Ages. Rich in mediaeval, Renaissance and Baroque buildings, it is characterized by the ancient portici (arcades), built on both sides of via Roma (the main street of the old town) but also along other streets, such as via Cavour, via Garibaldi, via Barotti, via Muratori. On the Eastern side, the old town is delimited by viale Mellano, a pedestrian promenade with views of Langhe; on the Western side, along via Martiri dell'Indipendenza, viale Sacerdote and viale Bianco, there is a view of south-western Alps, whose apex is Monviso. Some sections of the ancient town walls are still extant.

=== Castle of the Princes of Acaja ===
The castle with four high towers, begun by Filippo d'Acaia in 1314 and finished in 1332. It has a square plan with four powerful towers at each side, connected by passages with merlons. One century later Amadeus VIII of Savoy turned it into a ducal residence; the beautiful inner courtyard, designed by Gaspare Solari, is from the late 15th century. After serving as jail and barracks, the castle is now the seat of cultural events and houses a regional library.

=== Other sights ===
The cathedral was reconstructed at the end of the 18th century in Neoclassical style, replacing the former 13th century church.

The town's hospital and the Trinity Church were designed by Francesco Gallo in the 18th century. The Palazzo del Comandante is a Baroque building constructed in the 17th century. There are also mineral baths and a center for agriculture and cattle-breeding.

== People ==
- Oddino Barrotti (c. 1330–1400), parish priest and Franciscan tertiary known for charitable work in Fossano, beatified in 1808.
- Margaret of Savoy (1390–1464), born in Fossano, was one of the last of the Acaia branch of the House of Savoy. She became Marquise of Montferrat and, on being widowed, a nun at Alba.
- Ambrogio Bergognone (c. 1470s – 1523–24), Italian Renaissance painter; is said to have been born here.
- Giovanni Giovenale Ancina (1545–1604), priest, scholar and composer, was beatified in the late nineteenth century.
- Jules Dupuit (18 May 1804 – 5 September 1866), Fossano-born French civil engineer and economist
- Fiorenzo Bava Beccaris (1831–1924), a general, especially remembered for the Bava Beccaris massacre, was born in Fossano.
- Giuseppe "Joe Sr" Gallo (15 July 1882 – 21 June 1933), Fossano-born emigrant to the United States, founder of California winery, father of Ernest, Julio, and "Joe Jr" Gallo
- Lorenzo Perrone (1904-1952), stonemason who saved Primo Levi in Auschwitz concentration camp
- Blessed Giacomo (James) Alberione (1884–1971), Fossano-born priest and founder of the Society of Saint Paul and nine other orders and secular institutes of consecrated life altogether known as the Pauline Family, influential in the development of Vatican II's Inter Mirifica, built Regina deli Apostoli alla Montagnola in Rome, blessed on his death bed by Pope Paul VI, and beatified by Pope John Paul II April 23, 2003.
- Paola Barale, show girl and Madonna former look-alike
- Giovenale Boetto, artist

== Twin towns – sister cities ==
Fossano is twinned with:

- Camponogara, Italy
- Długołęka, Poland
- Rafaela, Argentina

== See also ==
- Roman Catholic Diocese of Fossano
