= San Francesco Saverio =

San Francesco Saverio is the Italian name of St Francis Xavier. It can refer to:

- Church of San Francesco Saverio, Foggia
- Church of San Francesco Saverio, Mondovì
- Church of San Francesco Saverio, Palermo
- Church of San Francesco Saverio, Rimini
- Church of San Francesco Saverio, Sansepolcro
- Church of San Francesco Saverio, Trento
- Church of San Francesco Saverio alla Garbatella, Rome
