= Boetto =

Surname

Boetto is an Italian surname. Notable people with the surname include:

- Giovenale Boetto (1604 - 1678), Piedmontese fresco painter who flourished at Turin, Italy
- Pietro Boetto (1871 – 1946), Italian Cardinal of the Roman Catholic Church

== See also ==
- Boetti
