= Joseph Gallo =

Joseph Gallo may refer to:

- Joseph Edward Gallo (1919–2007), cheese producer, brother of winemakers Ernest and Julio Gallo
- Joseph N. Gallo (1912–1995), American gangster, consigliere of the Gambino crime family
- Joe Gallo (1929–1972), also known as "Crazy Joe", American gangster, captain in the Colombo crime family
- Joe Gallo (basketball) (born 1980), American basketball coach
- Joey Gallo (born 1993), baseball player
