= Destination XL Group =

Specialty retailer of men's big and tall apparel

Destination XL Group, Inc.
- Company type: Public
- Traded as: Nasdaq: DXLG
- Industry: Retail
- Founded: 1976; 50 years ago
- Founder: Calvin Margolis; Stanley Berger
- Headquarters: Canton, Mass., U.S.
- Number of locations: DXL Men's Apparel:220; DXL Outlet:16; Casual Male XL:35; Casual Male XL Outlet:19
- Area served: United States
- Key people: Lionel F. Conacher (chairman); Harvey S Kanter (president & CEO)
- Products: Clothing; Home & Living Items
- Revenue: US$505.0 million (2021)
- Net income: US$56.7 million (2021)
- Number of employees: 1,353
- Divisions: Destination XL; Casual Male XL
- Website: dxl.com

Destination XL Group, Inc. (DXLG) is a leading retailer of Men's Big and Tall apparel with 290 retail and outlet store locations throughout the United States operated under the business subsidiaries DXL and Casual Male XL. The company also operates an e-commerce website (dxl.com) and an Android and iOS mobile app serving customers in the United States, Canada, The United Kingdom, Greater China and other global markets. The company is headquartered in Canton, Massachusetts, and is listed on the NASDAQ under the symbol "DXLG".

== History ==
What is now Destination XL Group was founded in 1976 by Calvin Margolis and Stanley Berger as Designs, Inc.

Until 1995, Designs, Inc operated exclusively in Levi Strauss & Co. branded apparel mall and outlet stores.

In May 2002, Designs, Inc. acquired the Casual Male Big & Tall chain of stores at a bankruptcy auction. At the time, Casual Male was the largest specialty retailer of men's clothing in the U.S. big and tall market. After completing the acquisition, the newly formed Casual Male Retail Group, Inc elected to focus on those stores, selling off their other businesses and assuming the Casual Male name.

In 2004, the company acquired Rochester Big & Tall Clothing, which gave the company access to a number of designer brands including Robert Graham, Tommy Bahama, Cutter & Buck, Jack Victor, and Robert Talbott. That same year, Casual Male hired former champion boxer George Foreman to promote the chain and act as spokesman for new lines of clothing bearing his name.

In 2005, Casual Male changed the name of its stores from Casual Male Big & Tall to Casual Male XL.

In 2010, the company opened its first DXL store in Schaumburg, Illinois offering customers an extensive assortment of products, ranging from value-oriented to luxury-oriented with an increased presence of name brands.

In 2011, based on the success of the DXL store format, the company launched the destinationxl.com ecommerce website, which has since been rebranded to dxl.com.

In 2019, the company closed all remaining Rochester Clothing stores.
