= Gallo family =

American wine family

The Gallo family is an American wine family. The father, Giuseppe "Joseph" Gallo, Sr., immigrant from Fossano, Italy, after a period of menial labor started farming grapes, founded a winery, and died in a murder-suicide when he shot his wife and then killed himself.

Ernest and Julio Gallo started E. & J. Gallo Winery, which today is the largest exporter of California wines. Julio was focused on the production of wine, and Ernest on its sale. A third brother, Joseph, was a rancher, cheese maker, and founder of Joseph Gallo Farms. In the 1980s, Julio and Ernest sued Joseph for its use of Gallo as a brand name for his cheese brand, and eventually won the trial.

== Julio ==
Julio Gallo (March 21, 1910 – May 2, 1993) is one of the founders of the E & J Gallo Winery, along with his brother Ernest Gallo. Julio Gallo was married to Aileen Gallo (1913–1999). He died in a car accident on 2 May 1993. His wife and granddaughters who were in the accident survived the crash. He was 83 and his personal fortune was estimated to $300 million.

== Ernest ==
Ernest Gallo (March 18, 1909 – March 6, 2007) was the American co-founder of the E & J Gallo Winery. He was ranked 297th on the 2006 Forbes 400 list of billionaires.

After the death of his parents, Ernest and brother Julio, along with their wives Amelia (1910–1993) and Aileen, raised their thirteen-year-old little brother Joseph. In 1986, the brothers sued Joseph for using the Gallo name on his cheese labels. The brothers won and their relationship with Joseph was forever strained.

Ernest Gallo was married for sixty-two years to Amelia Franzia Gallo until she died on December 22, 1993. The couple had two sons: David, who died in 1997, and Joseph. His younger brother, Joseph Gallo, died on February 17, 2007, at age eighty-seven. Weeks later, on March 6, 2007, Ernest Gallo died at his home in Modesto, California, twelve days shy of his 98th birthday.

Gallo was profiled by PBS's Frontline: So you want to buy a president? series. He is also known to have said, regarding the wine industry:

"We don't want most of the business. We want it all.

== Joseph ==
Joseph Edward Gallo (September 11, 1919 – February 17, 2007) was a prominent California rancher. He founded one of the largest family-owned dairy operations in the world, Joseph Gallo Farms, which produces dairy products including a variety of cheeses. The company is now run by his son, CEO Michael Gallo. Joseph Gallo was the younger brother of Ernest and Julio, founders of E & J Gallo Winery. Joseph was sued by his brothers and forced to stop using the Gallo name on his cheese, thereafter labeled Joseph Farms.

== See also ==
- Joseph Gallo Farms
