= Angelo Italia =

Italian Jesuit and Baroque architect (1628–1700)

- Born: 8 May 1628; Licata, Sicily, Italy
- Died: 5 May 1700 (aged 71); Palermo, Sicily, Italy
- Occupations: Jesuit and architect

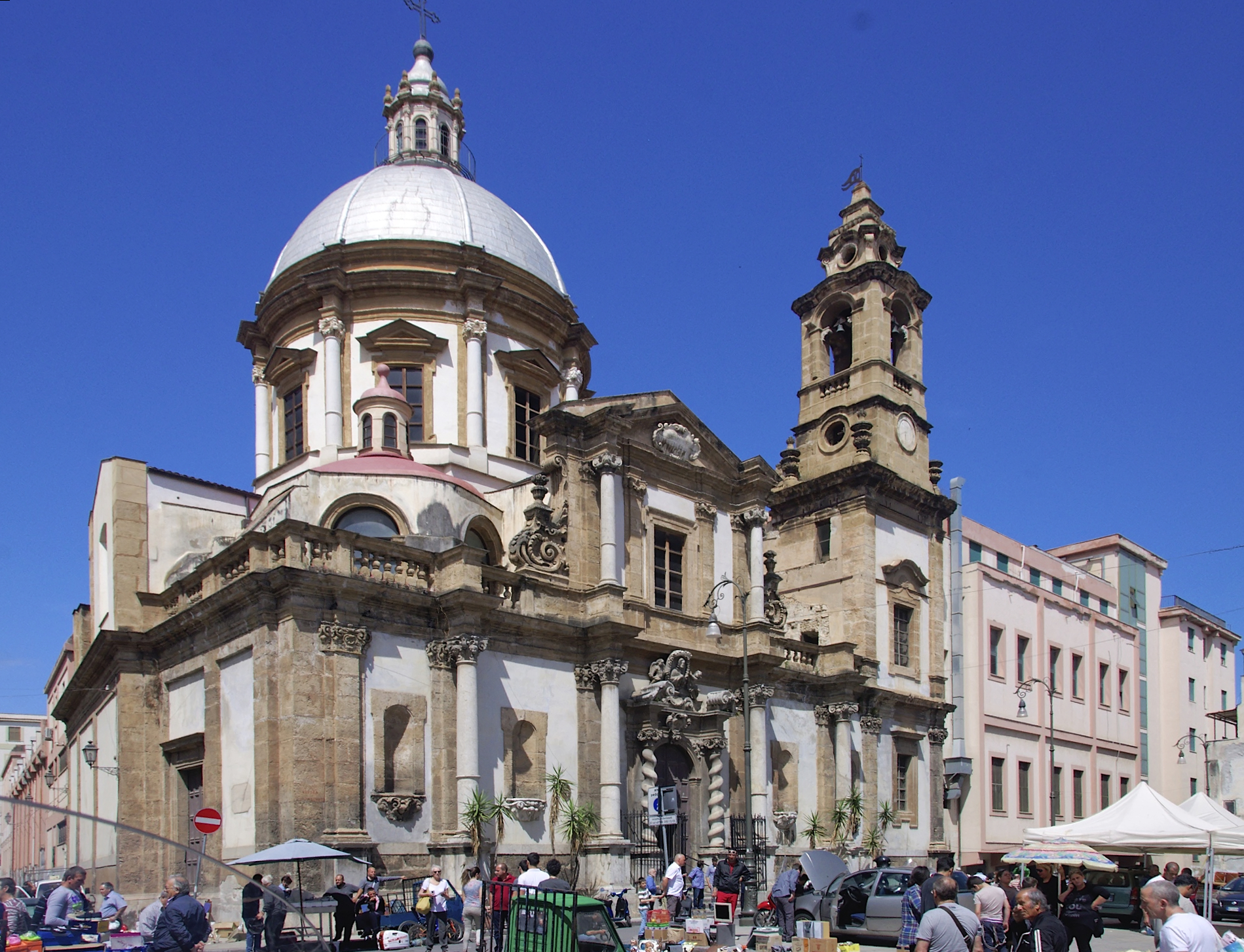
San Francesco Saverio, Palermo

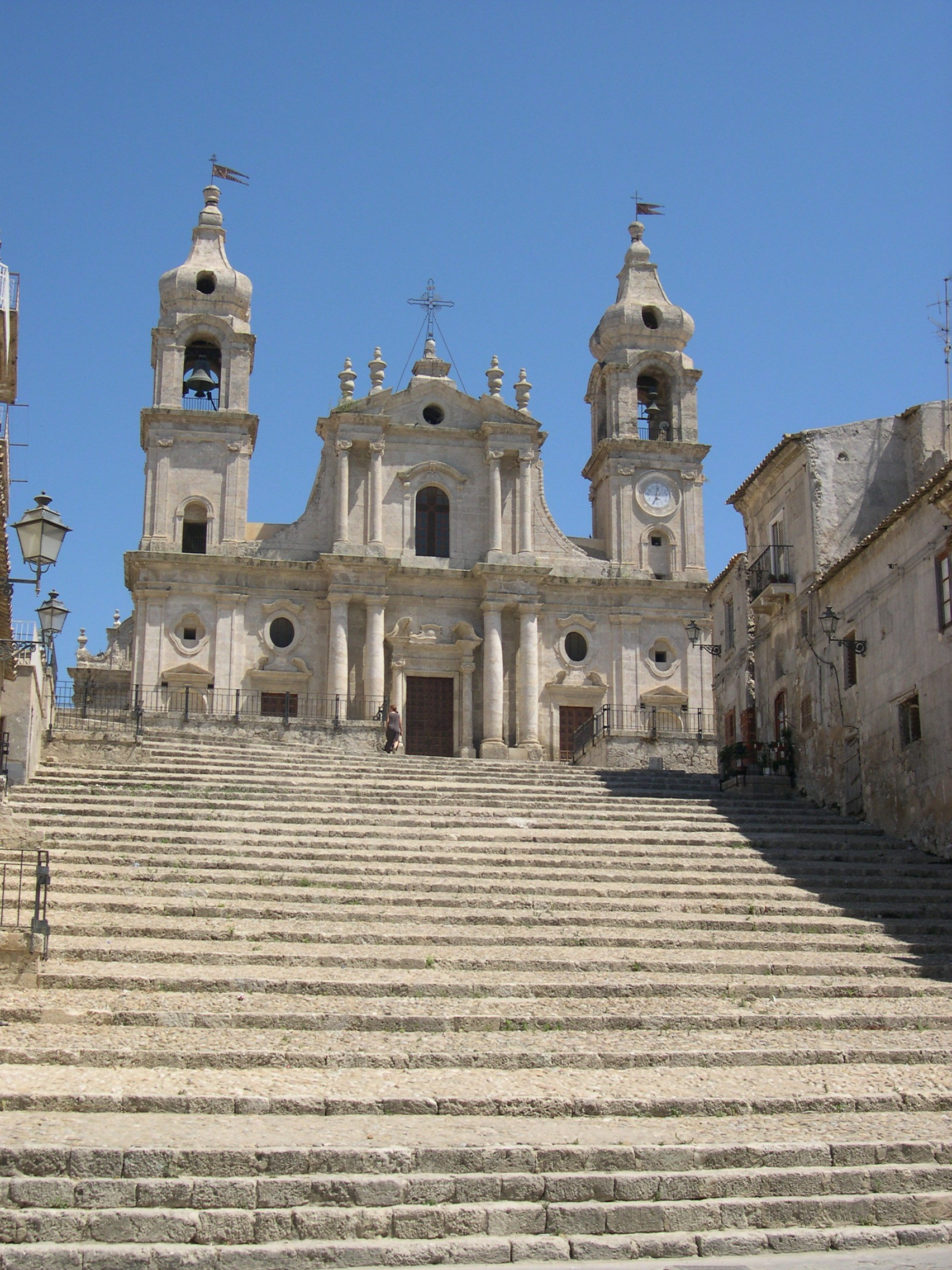
Chiesa Madre, Palma di Montechiaro, Sicily

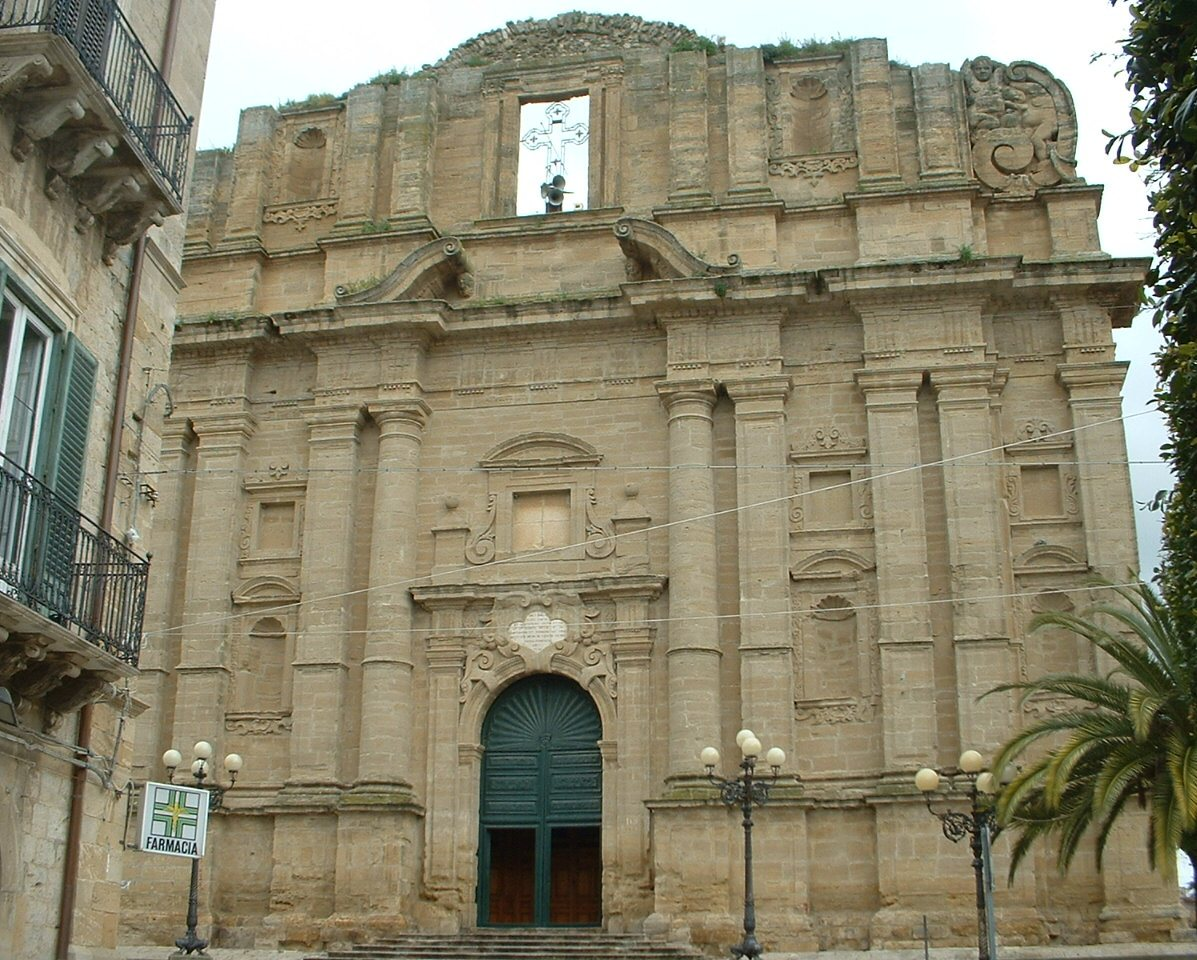
Mazzarino, facade of the Parish Church of Our Lady of the Snow

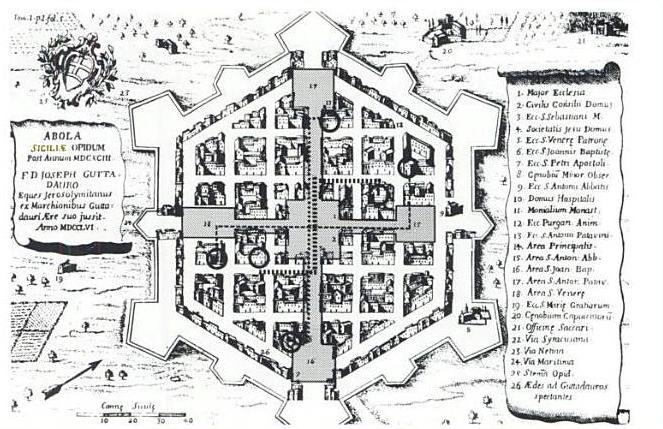
1756 print showing the layout of Avola

Angelo Italia (8 May 1628 – 5 May 1700) was an Italian Jesuit and Baroque architect, who was born in Licata and died in Palermo. He designed a number of churches in Sicily, and later worked to reconstruct three cities following the 1693 Sicily earthquake.

== Biography ==
His father was a master mason in Licata, from whom he received technical training. His first work as an architect was the construction of the Chiesa di Sant'Angelo Carmelitano in Licata, dated 1653.

In November 1671 he joined the order of the Jesuits at the age of 43 and after his novitiate in Messina in 1671–1672 he went to the Jesuit College in Palermo. The originality of his designs for the Holy Sacrament of Palermo and the Jesuit church of San Francesco da Saverio indicates that it is likely that his architectural studies had taken him to Rome, Naples and other Italian cities, and that he was familiar with the works of Francesco Borromini, Girolamo and Carlo Rainaldi and Pietro da Cortona. He saw the work of Guarino Guarini in Messina in 1672, and this influenced him in a decisive way. He may also have met Borromini in Messina, since Italia's unusual design for the Jesuit College of Mazara del Vallo shows Borromini's influence.

Between 1685 and 1692 was in the service of the powerful and cultured Carlo Carafa Branciforte, Prince of Butera, for the realisation of the Chiesa Santa Maria della Neve (Church of St. Mary of the Snow) in Mazzarino.

After the devastating east Sicilian earthquake of 1693, Italia designed the cities of Avola, then Lentini, and then Noto. These three new urbanization projects establish him as the most important figure in the reconstruction.

He remained in eastern Sicily until he returned to Palermo in 1700, where he died.

== Works ==
His works show several influences, and the use of the hexagonal shape is a characteristic feature of Italia's work; for example, in the Chapel of the Crucifix in the Cathedral of Monreale, the church of Palermo St. Francis Xavier, and in the street plan of Avola. His major works include:

=== Architecture ===
- Chiesa di Sant'Angelo Carmelitano, Licata (from 1653)
- Chiesa Madre, Palma di Montechiaro (1666). This church, which was built by the family Tomasi di Lampedusa, founders and feudal lords of the city, is a longitudinal plan with three naves, a transept and dome. The white-stone church stands in a dominant position at the top of a long flight of steps, and shows a maturity of technical skill and familiarity with the architectural developments of the time.
- Chiesa di S. Girolamo in Polizzi (1681), attached to the college of the Jesuits, was almost contemporary with the most famous church of St. Francis Xavier and presents a central octagonal plan with radiating chapels.
- Church of San Francesco Saverio, Palermo (1685), was built between 1685 and 1710 in the district dell'Albergharia in Palermo. The building is considered a masterpiece of architecture and has an octagonal central plan, the result of an overlap between a Greek cross and a square, corresponding to the vertices of which there are four hexagonal chapels connected to each them to form a sort of ambulatory. The central space is covered with a large dome resting only on sturdy columns. The side chapels are also covered with small domes and bright. The result is a complex space and fully Baroque showing the influence of the work of Guarini and Borromini. Work was interrupted by financial difficulties, and by 1700 the church was still without its facade, dome and some of the interior decoration. It was completed in 1730.
- Church of Santa Maria della Neve in Mazzarino, commissioned by Carlo Carafa Branciforte, Prince of Butera, was designed with one large barrel-vaulted nave. It is listed in the works of Angelo Italy since 1685, but remained unfinished, perhaps because of technical difficulties related to the vaulted roof, or perhaps due to the death of the architect, or funding problems. It was completed only in the nineteenth century, but with three naves.
- Chiesa del Collegio della Compagnia di Gesù dedicated to St. Francesco Borgia in Catania was reconstructed after the 1693 earthquake. Italia produced plans based on the foundations of a previously destroyed church, but the building work then took place between 1698 and 1736, and the church was consecrated in 1754.
- Basilica of Santa Maria Assunta in Alcamo (1699) was designed in collaboration with architect Giuseppe Diamante, and returns to the traditional basilica plan, with three naves that expand laterally in a series of chapels. It was built on a pre-existing medieval site after the architect's death, and was adorned with large frescoes by the Flemish Guglielmo Borremans. The facade of Emanuele Cardona is late eighteenth century.
- Chapel of the Crucifix in the Cathedral of Monreale (1672): the design of the chapel (with Paolo Amato), glowing with coloured marbles, a testament to Italia's interest in polychromy, is characterized by a complex biblical iconography of the walls and floor, inlaid with a depiction of the Shipwreck of Jonah.
- Carmine Maggiore in Palermo: new construction of the dome, with characteristic grotesques, scrolls and foliage, and decorated with brightly coloured tiles.
- Church of the Jesuits, Mazara del Vallo, elliptical, with vivid sculptures on the exterior.
- Marble fountain at the former Jesuit Collegio Massimo in Palermo.
- Design of Santa Maria almsgiving (Collegiate) in Catania.

=== Urban development ===
==== Avola (1693) ====
Following the 1693 earthquake, Italia was commissioned by representatives of the Duke of Terranova, feudal lord of Avola, to design the reconstruction plan for the city. Italia chose a flat area, rich in water and relatively close to the sea, a location opposed by the viceroy, who thought it was difficult to defend, but it was nevertheless adopted. In 1694 work began on the various buildings. The urban layout combines a hexagonal shape with two lines that meet at right angles in a square. This combined symmetry and order with open spaces and broad, straight roads to minimise damage in any future earthquake. This design also comparable with that used for the reconstruction of contemporary Grammichele, and can be referred to as an ideal Renaissance City. As Vittorini wrote in 1694:

By order of the Consultor, Prince of Santa Flavia, the Master Architect Brother Angelo Italia of the Company of Jesus was sent to that city in order to observe the most opportune site and the most salubrious air for the rebuilding of the new city. The above mentioned Brother Angelo conducted an examination of the location and, having observed with precision all the territory of Avola, found no better location and site that the district of the City of Avola, known as Mutube, in which the new city was moved in the form communicated to Your Excellency, approximately one mile and a half from the sea, in a most beautiful and agreeable, broad plain... Through the middle of the city pass the waters of the source known as the Miranda. The walls of the houses around the city serve for its defence for they are all surrounded by small openings to keep enemies at bay with a few muskets and guns...

— Vittorini (1694), Relatione di quanto si è operato nella nuova città d'Avola dal giorno del terremoto 11 gennaio 1693 a questa parte

The architect himself with the help of 50 workers, traced the pattern of the new city on the ground, defining not only the streets and walls, but also the location of public buildings and private lots.

==== Lentini (1693) ====
As with Avola, Italia planned to reconstruct Lentini on a site some distance from the rubble of the destroyed city, but after the inhabitants asked the King (Giuseppe Lanza, Duke of Calastra) to override these plans he granted their wish and allowed them to rebuild the city on the old site.

==== Noto (1693) ====
Ancient Noto occupied a site on the summit of Mount Alveria, but following the earthquake it was agreed that it should be rebuilt some 10 km away on the slopes of Mount Meti. Angelo Italia was one of those involved in the construction plan, along with Dutch military engineer Carlos de Grunenberg, mathematician Giovanni Landolina and military architect Giuseppe Formenti.
