= Oddino Barrotti =

Famous Italian priest

Blessed Oddino Barrotti
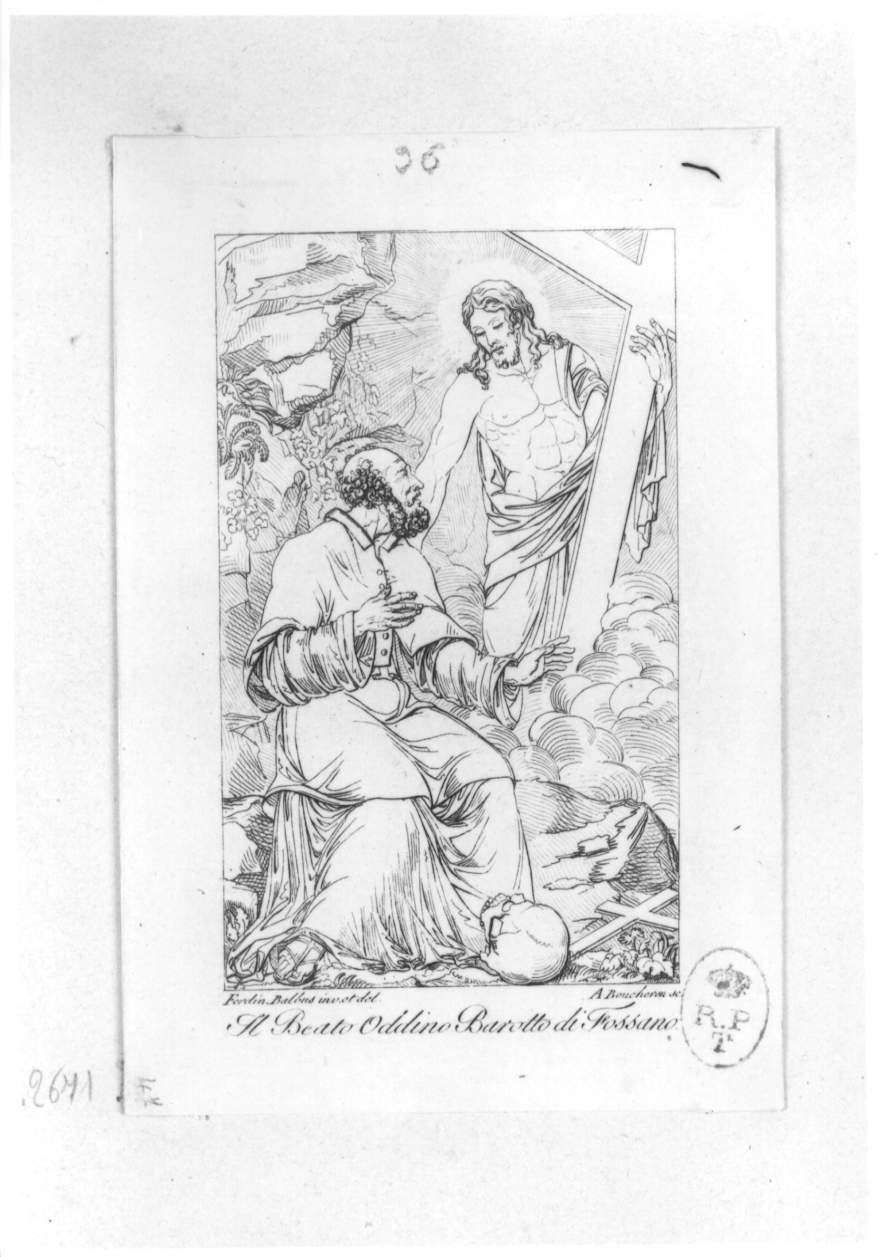
- Engraving of Blessed Oddino Barrotti by Angelo Michele Boucheron after a design by Ferdinando Balbo, ca. 1809

Priest
- Born: c. 1344; Fossano, Piedmont, Italy
- Died: July 7, 1400; Fossano, Piedmont, Italy
- Venerated in: Catholic Church
- Beatified: 1808 by Pope Pius VII
- Feast: July 21

Oddino Barrotti or Barotto (c. 1344 – July 7, 1400), also known as Oddino of Fossano, was an Italian parish priest active in the Piedmont region during the 14th century. He is recognized by the Catholic Church as a beatus, with a feast day observed on July 21.

== Life ==
Barrotti was born in Fossano, Piedmont, in perhaps 1344. He is traditionally believed to have been born on what is now Via Garibaldi and baptized at the Church of San Giorgio. He came from a noble or aristocratic family background and his parents were named Giacomo and Caterina.

He was ordained a priest in early September 1367, receiving a dispensation due to his young age. In 1374, he was appointed provost of the Collegiate Church of San Giovenale, then the most populous parish in Fossano. Other sources claim that he was appointed to this position while still only a subdeacon, an exception justified by his reputation for prudence and honesty.

Around 1378, during the period of the Western Schism, Barrotti resigned from his position. Though no biographer has given a definitive reason, some sources link his decision to the conflict between Pope Urban VI and the Avignon claimant Clement VII, a situation that divided the Church. Barrotti withdrew from public office and embarked on a series of pilgrimages. He first joined a small group of companions on a walking pilgrimage to Rome, stopping in Loreto along the way. Upon his return, he received a formal censure from the bishop of Turin for having celebrated Mass in territory aligned with Pope Urban VI, indicating the bishop's loyalty to the Avignon claimant Clement VII. The incident reflects the complex ecclesiastical divisions of the Western Schism. The trip likely included a stop in Assisi and influenced Barrotti's decision to join the Third Order of Saint Francis.

In 1381, he undertook a second pilgrimage to the Holy Land, during which he was allegedly captured and imprisoned by the Ottomans. After his release, Barrotti returned once more to Fossano and adopted an increasingly austere lifestyle. He became known for living in near-poverty, giving away most of what he received, including food. Concerned for his health, the bishop of Turin ordered him to eat meat and retain tithes for his own needs, forbidding him to use these funds for almsgiving or book purchases.

In this period, he became governor of the Confraternità del Crocifisso (Confraternity of the Crucifix), a charitable association dedicated to assisting the sick and providing hospitality to travelers. Under his leadership, a hospital and hospice were established in Fossano, foundations which continued to operate into the nineteenth century. As a part of this work, Barrotti helped establish two isolation facilities outside the city to treat patients with leprosy and other infectious diseases. Barrotti was later invited to supervise the construction of a new church for the collegiate chapter—an undertaking that had stalled for over a century. In 1395, he was formally appointed procurator of the construction, praised in the appointment record as a priest of “utmost integrity, zeal, and uncommon activity.” Accounts from the period attribute various extraordinary events to him during this time. In 1396, he was again appointed provost and resumed leadership of the parish.

During an outbreak of plague in 1400, Barrotti remained active in caring for the sick, offering spiritual support and organizing aid for the poor. He eventually contracted the disease himself and died on July 7 of that year, reportedly his 56th birthday. Because of the contagious nature of the illness, he was buried the same day in the tomb of the canons after only a brief vigil.

== Alleged miracles ==
Several miracles were attributed to Oddino Barrotti both during his life and after his death. Contemporary and later sources, including the Bollandist Acta Sanctorum, recount a number of events considered signs of sanctity.

One commonly cited miracle occurred during the reconstruction of the collegiate church in Fossano. A cart carrying a large wooden beam became stuck in deep mud despite being drawn by three pairs of oxen. Barrotti reportedly approached, blessed the beam, and instructed only two oxen to pull it; the beam was then easily moved. In another incident, a stonemason fell from the tower and was believed dead. Barrotti prayed over him, took his hand, and told him to rise; the man stood up unharmed and returned to work.

On another occasion, Barrotti decided to send a donated Christmas capon to a poor woman who had just given birth. When a servant claimed not to know her address, Barrotti told him that God would show him the way. A dog then led the servant directly to the woman's home.

== Veneration ==
Devotion to Barrotti developed locally after his death. In the days following his burial, witnesses reported seeing what they described as Barrotti kneeling before the high altar at dawn, surrounded by light. These reports led to an investigation by the bishop, who on 22 July 1400—just fifteen days after his death—ordered that Barrotti's body be moved from the crypt to a raised tomb. Accounts from the time claimed that visitors received relief from ailments, especially headaches, by touching the tomb and invoking his intercession. Over time, the tomb became surrounded by votive offerings placed in thanksgiving for healing from illness. Local painters, reportedly at the request of patrons, began depicting Barrotti with traditional saintly attributes such as halos and rays of light, despite the absence of formal canonization. Such images were found in several churches associated with his life, including San Giorgio, San Giovanni, San Francesco, the hospital, and the collegiate church. In 1595, when his tomb interfered with renovations to the choir, it was translated to a new location and placed in a decorated niche.

Local devotion to Barrotti persisted for centuries, and he was commonly referred to as “Blessed” even before official recognition. A formal diocesan inquiry under Bishop Tommaso Piolatto in 1608 attested to the existence of a continuous local cult originating with the elevation of his tomb. After a long pause, the cause was reopened in the early 19th century by the cathedral chapter during a period when the diocese was vacant. The case was promoted by Abbot Giuseppe Michele Caramelli and supported by Count Gaetano Falletti di Torre d’Uzzone, the last known descendant of the Barrotti family. A printed biography by Giuseppe Muratori, written in a critical biographical style and published in 1809, described longstanding local customs and may have been included with the dossier sent to Rome. His cultus was formally confirmed by Pope Pius VII on 3 September 1808.

As of 2020, the only statue of Blessed Oddino in the Diocese of Fossano is located on the façade of the Sanctuary of Cussanio.
