= Louis M. Martini Winery =

Winery in Napa Valley, California

- Location: Napa Valley, California, United States
- Varietals: Cabernet Sauvignon, Chardonnay, Merlot, Pinot noir, Sauvignon blanc, Syrah
- Distribution: International
- Website: louismartini.com

Louis M. Martini Winery is a winery and distributor headquartered in Napa Valley, California.

== History ==
The winery was founded by Louis M. Martini, who was born in Genoa, Italy, and immigrated to the United States in 1900 at the age of 13 to join his father in San Francisco. He spoke no English and had little formal education. At age 19 he returned to Italy to study winemaking. On his return, he and his father went into the wine business with others, eventually establishing the L.M. Martini Grape Products Company. Because of Prohibition, it sold only non-alcoholic and sacramental products.

Anticipating the end of Prohibition, Martini looked for a location suitable for growing grapes for the dry wines he preferred. He chose the Napa Valley and purchased a 10-acre prune orchard in St. Helena, planted it with vineyards, and established the Louis M. Martini Winery. He began to sell wine on December 5, 1933, the first day such sale was legally allowed. He introduced or promoted multiple changes that are now common practice, such as growing grapes on hillsides, favoring dry wines rather than the sweet wines which were then more popular, and labeling wines with variety and vintage at a time when most wines were bottled as generics. He was a founder of the Napa Valley Vintners Association in 1943.

In the 1930s Martini purchased a mountainside wine ranch in Sonoma County and named it Monte Rosso for its red soil. At the time high-elevation vineyards were unusual, but the site he bought had been a winery since the 1880s, and Martini had purchased fruit from the ranch for years. For a time the wines from these vineyards—elevation 700 feet (210 m) to 1,300 feet (400 m)—were marketed with "Mountain" or "California Mountain" in their name, but after many other wineries started using the "Mountain" descriptor, Martini's were changed to "Monte Rosso", and wines from those vineyards are still sold under that name.

In 1946 the patriarch, Louis M. Martini, was succeeded by his son, Louis P. Martini, a UC Berkeley graduate with a degree in food science. He also studied enology at UC Davis. He introduced innovations like cold rooms and wind machines, and worked with the Napa Technical Group to improve Napa winemaking and grape growing practices. His son Mike Martini joined the family business in 1974. His innovations included increased maceration time (leaving the wine in contact with the skins) and eliminating redwood tanks.

The Martini business model was to produce large quantities of many different wines, mostly red, and sell them at modest prices. This was a disadvantage by the 1980s and 1990s, when white wine was more popular and pricier wines were selling well. The fourth generation of the Martini family was not interested in working in the winery. As a result, the entire operation was sold in 2002 to Modesto-based E & J Gallo Winery, which was looking for an entry into Napa. Keeping the name Louis M. Martini Winery, Gallo increased production dramatically and trimmed the wine portfolio from its numerous varieties to focus on Zinfandel and Cabernet Sauvignon.
