= Gallo (winery) =

Winery and distributor in California

- Location: Modesto, California, United States
- Coordinates: 37.6335°N 120.9851°W
- Formerly: E & J Gallo Winery
- Other labels: Don Miguel Gascon; Louis Martini; Ecco Domani; Mirassou Winery; New Amsterdam; J Vineyards; Barefoot; Apothic; Shellback rum; among others
- Founded: 1933; 93 years ago
- Key people: Ernest Gallo (founder); Julio Gallo (founder); Gina Gallo (winemaker); Stephanie Gallo
- Varietals: Cabernet Sauvignon, Chardonnay, Merlot, Pinot noir, Sauvignon blanc, Syrah
- Distribution: International
- Website: www.gallo.com, gallofamily.co.uk

GALLO (also stylized Gallo, previously E. & J. Gallo Winery) is an American wine producer and distributor headquartered in Modesto, California. The company was founded in 1933 by Ernest Gallo and Julio Gallo of the Gallo family and primarily produces California wines. It is the largest family-owned winery in the United States and reported an annual revenue of $5.3 billion.

== History ==
During Prohibition in the United States, Ernest and Julio Gallo grew grapes, selling them to Eastern states, where home winemaking was legal.

Muskrat trappers in Delacroix, Louisiana, 1941, gathered around a large bottle of "Cream of California - California Claret", an early Gallo mass-produced wine

The winery was established in the fall of 1933, following the repeal of Prohibition. The Gallos' starting capital was less than $6,000 ($152,240 in 2026), with $5,000 borrowed by Ernest from his mother-in-law, Teresa Franzia. The brothers studied commercial oenology by reading pre-Prohibition pamphlets published by the University of California, which they retrieved from the basement of the Modesto Public Library. Julio focused on the production of wine, and Ernest on its sale. Early operations utilized a single tractor operated on consecutive 12-hour shifts. In their first year of activity, the brothers produced 177,000 gallons of wine.

In 1957, Gallo began selling a fortified white wine called Thunderbird. In 1962, the company launched the one-gallon finger-ringed jug of wine, Red Mountain, which was later marketed under the Carlo Rossi brand, named after a winery above Oakdale that had closed during Prohibition. As the US wine market gradually shifted away from lower-cost wines, Ernest and Julio introduced modern brand-management practices into the wine industry, and established long-term grower contracts for varietal grapes, as well as grape research programs. Additionally, the company built a foreign sales and marketing operation to export California wines. Gallo's 1960s advertisements were designed to associate their US-made wines with Europe's fine wine regions.

During the 1980s and 1990s, Gallo bought wine labels from Europe and Australia. By 1993, the company was the country's largest winery, holding a 25% share of the American wine market. Julio Gallo died in a car accident on May 2, 1993. Following Ernest's death in 2007, his son, Joe Gallo, took over the company as CEO.

In 2002, Gallo purchased the Louis M. Martini Winery, providing the company with its first location in Napa Valley. On September 14, 2007, Martha Stewart Living Omnimedia announced a partnership with Gallo to produce a brand of wine labeled "Martha Stewart Vintage." In 2011, Gallo sold Hornsby's hard cider to the C&C Group for an undisclosed amount and partnered with the Boisset Collection to purchase the Mondavi estate. In 2017, Gallo bought the Stagecoach Vineyard in Napa Valley.

In April 2019, Constellation Brands Inc. announced a deal to sell wine brands, including Clos du Bois and Mark West, to Gallo for $1.7 billion. The deal was later amended, twice, to exclude sparkling wine brands Cook's California 'Champagne' and J. Roget American 'Champagne' (both retained by Constellation for four years post final agreement). Under the amended terms, Paul Masson Brandy was divested to Sazerac Company Inc., while Sheffield Cellars and Fairbanks were sold to Precept Brands LLC, and its High Color Concentrates division was divested to Vie-Del Company. The deal, now with an adjusted price agreement of $1.1B, included a $250 million earn-out if brand performance provisions were met over two years after closing. The agreement was finalized on January 6, 2021, for $810 million.

In 2020, the University of California, Merced announced plans for the Ernest & Julio Gallo School of Management, the first new school established at the campus since its opening.

In 2024, the company shortened its name to GALLO.

== Legacy ==
=== Ecological impact ===
In collaboration with the Wine Institute and the California Association of Winegrape Growers, Gallo helped develop and implement the Code of Sustainable Wine Growing Practices, which addresses viticulture, grape growing, winemaking, and facility operations, with the overall goal of reducing the environmental impact of wine production.

Gallo received ISO 14001 certification (a standard created to reduce environmental impact) from the International Organization for Standardization.

In April 2009, the California State Water Resources Control Board served Gallo Glass Co. (a Gallo Winery subsidiary) with a cease and desist order and a $73,000 fine for allegedly channeling water from the Russian River into an unlicensed reservoir – there are provisions for licensing the reservoir under proper monitoring of flow and capacity.

In March 2015, the California Department of Toxic Substances Control sued Gallo Glass Company in Modesto over the alleged improper storage and recycling of hazardous dust used in wine bottle production. The company said the material was being recycled in accordance with standard industry practice.

In February 2023, the Central Valley Regional Water Quality Control Board ordered Gallo to pay $378,668 in fines for discharging irrigation and wastewater into the Merced River, which the board stated posed a threat to the health of fish and other aquatic life.

=== Vineyard trials ===
Viticulturists at the company conduct trials on different grape varieties across various California climates and soil types to assess growth efficiency. One of the varieties that Gallo has been trialing in the San Joaquin Valley is the French wine grape Ederena.

=== Awards ===
Gallo was named the "Bon Appétit Winery of the Year" in the 1996, 1998, and 2001 San Francisco International Wine Competitions.

Intangible Business, a brand valuation firm, rated Gallo as the world's "Most Powerful Wine Brand" in 2006, 2007, 2008, and 2009.

== Controversies ==
=== Legal disputes ===
In 1986, Ernest and Julio took legal action against their younger brother, Joseph, for using the Joseph Gallo Farms name on cheese products. Joseph sent in a counterclaim, alleging that the two brothers had conspired to deprive him of his rightful inheritance, including the winery itself, which his attorney argued was originally founded by their father. However, Joseph lost on both counts and was required to rebrand his business as Joseph Farms.

In the 1990s, Gallo Winery agreed with Gallo Pasta (a Spanish company) that the latter would not sell its pasta in the United States. Gallo filed a cease-and-desist order in April 2009, against "The Spanish Table", a Seattle-based specialty food retailer, for carrying the pasta despite the previous agreement with the manufacturer.

In February 2010, a French court convicted twelve winemakers and traders of fraud. They had mislabeled wine supplied to Gallo for its Red Bicyclette brand, falsely claiming that it was Pinot noir.

In October 2019, a lawsuit was filed in the Eastern District of California that claimed Gallo used patented technology without a license to develop their irrigation system.

=== Labor relations ===
The United Farm Workers (UFW) began boycotting Gallo in the summer of 1973 after Gallo did not renew its contract and recognized the International Brotherhood of Teamsters (IBT). The UFW began a strike on June 27, 1973, and organized a consumer boycott of Gallo products. The dispute occurred during a broader conflict between the UFW and the Teamsters over representation of California farmworkers in the early 1970s.

Led by Cesar Chavez, the UFW said that Gallo had negotiated out a "sweetheart deal" with the IBT that offered fewer protections. The UFW also said that workers did not agree to Teamster representation and called for an independently conducted secret-ballot election. Chávez offered to end the strike and boycott if the UFW lost. The UFW objected to proposed changes involving job security, hiring halls, health and safety protections, seniority and grievance procedures. Gallo disputed the union's statement, saying the breakdown was due to disagreements over the UFW's hiring-hall and disciplinary practices. Gallo also stated that due to a majority of its farmworkers with verified signatures supported the Teamsters, that it will maintain it's recognition with the Teamsters.

From February 22 to March 1, 1975, 10,000 UFW supporters marched 110 miles from either San Francisco or Delano to the Gallo winery in Modesto to demand a representation election.The boycott continued for several years.

Nationwide supporters of the boycott protested the buying and selling of Gallo wines. Student groups at Harvard University in Cambridge, MA, demanded that the university boycott Gallo and picketed local stores. In October 1974, approximately 70 demonstrators picketed Harvard Provision Company, asking customers to boycott Gallo wine.Gallo responded to the boycott with a nationwide advertising campaign disputing UFW's allegations. The boycott also coincided with broader legislative changes in California, including the 1975 California Agricultural Labor Relations Act, which established formal union election procedures for farmworkers.

After the law was enacted, the UFW had continued the boycott. They argued that elections alone could not guarantee strong contracts. On September 10, 1975, A representation election took place among Gallo's employees.The tally recorded was 223 votes for the Teamsters, 131 for the UFW, and 195 challenged ballots. These challenged ballots helped determine the outcome and were subject of proceedings before the California Agricultural Labor Relations Board (ALRB).

The strike also affected workers living in company housing. In a later decision, the ALRB documented that Gallo required employee Jose Amaral and his wife to leave the company-provided housing after he joined the strike. The board concluded that them moving to Rhode Island promptly after leaving the company housing did not mean that Amaral had lost interest in his Gallo job.

On January 13, 1978, Chávez said that the UFW executive board had ended the Gallo (wine) boycott along with its lettuce and table-grape boycotts, expressing optimism about the new California's Agricultural labor law. UFW representatives afterwards described a shift towards contract negotiations and legal enforcement while maintaining boycotts as a possible tactic for the future.

Lessening union power influence led to cancellations of union contracts in both Napa County and Sonoma County in the 2000s.

In October 2009, the California Agricultural Labor Relations Board (CALRB) revoked a 2007 election to eject the United Farm Workers from Gallo Winery, citing interference from Gallo. This was the second time in a decade a vote to remove the union was overturned due to allegations of Gallo illegally trying to influence proceedings; the other was a 2003 ruling in which the CALRB threw out an election, citing a foreman who improperly requested signatures for the petition for the vote. Gallo appealed the 2003 decision.

In 2023, Gallo laid off 355 of its California workers after a Texas company, Republic National Distributing Co. (RNDC), took control of handling partnerships with chain retailers in California.

== Wine brands ==
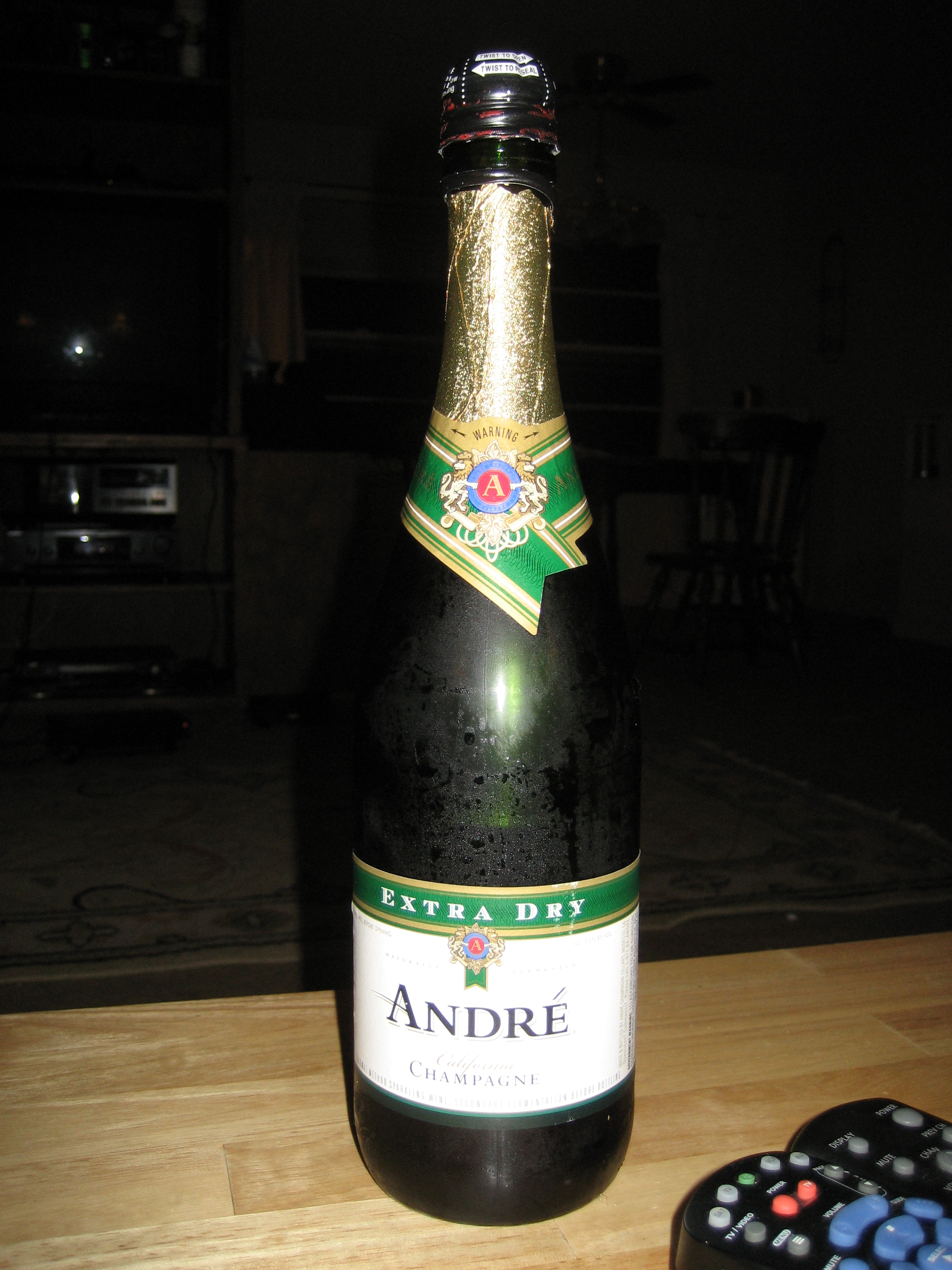
A bottle of André

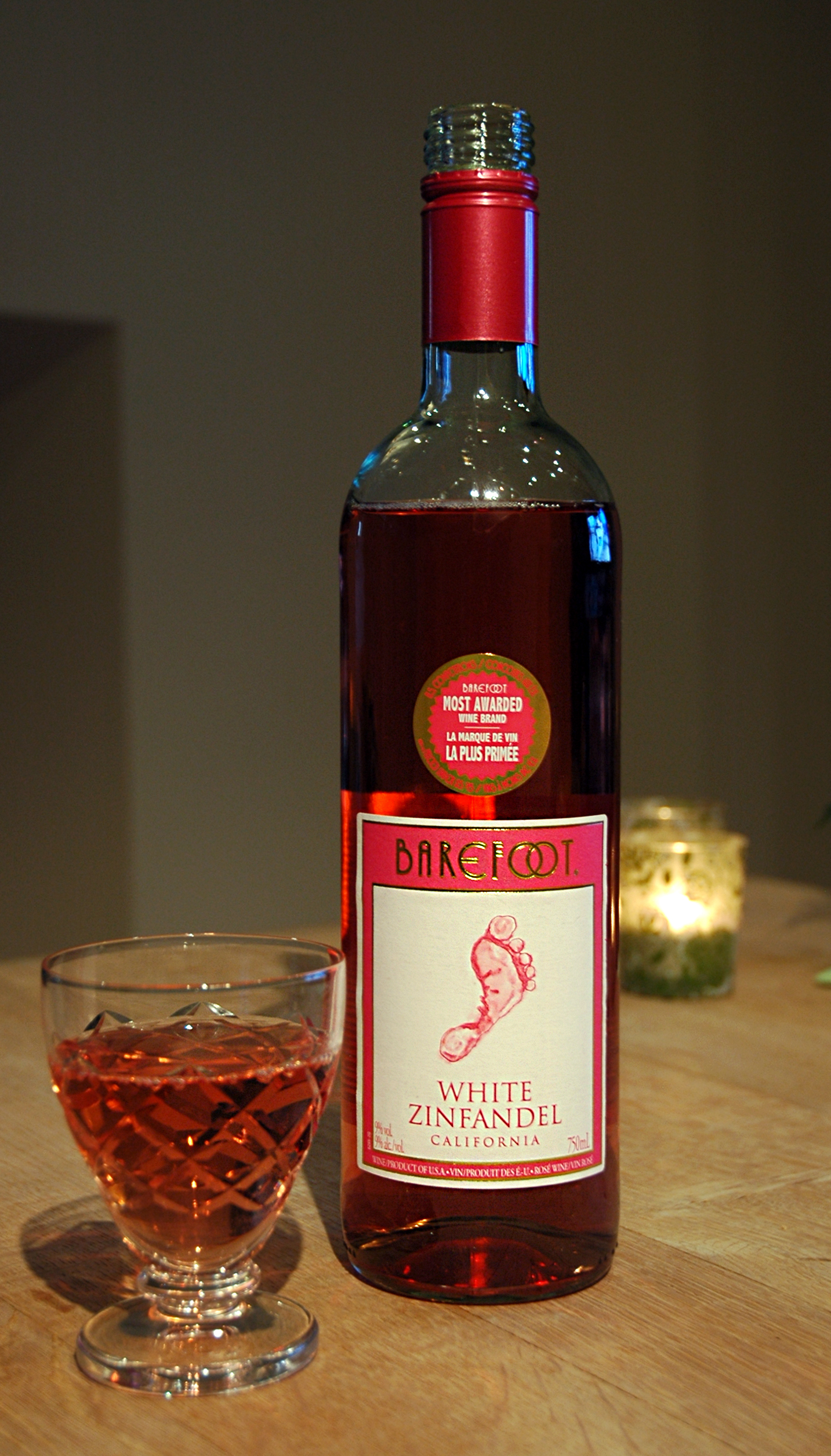
A bottle of Barefoot White Zinfandel

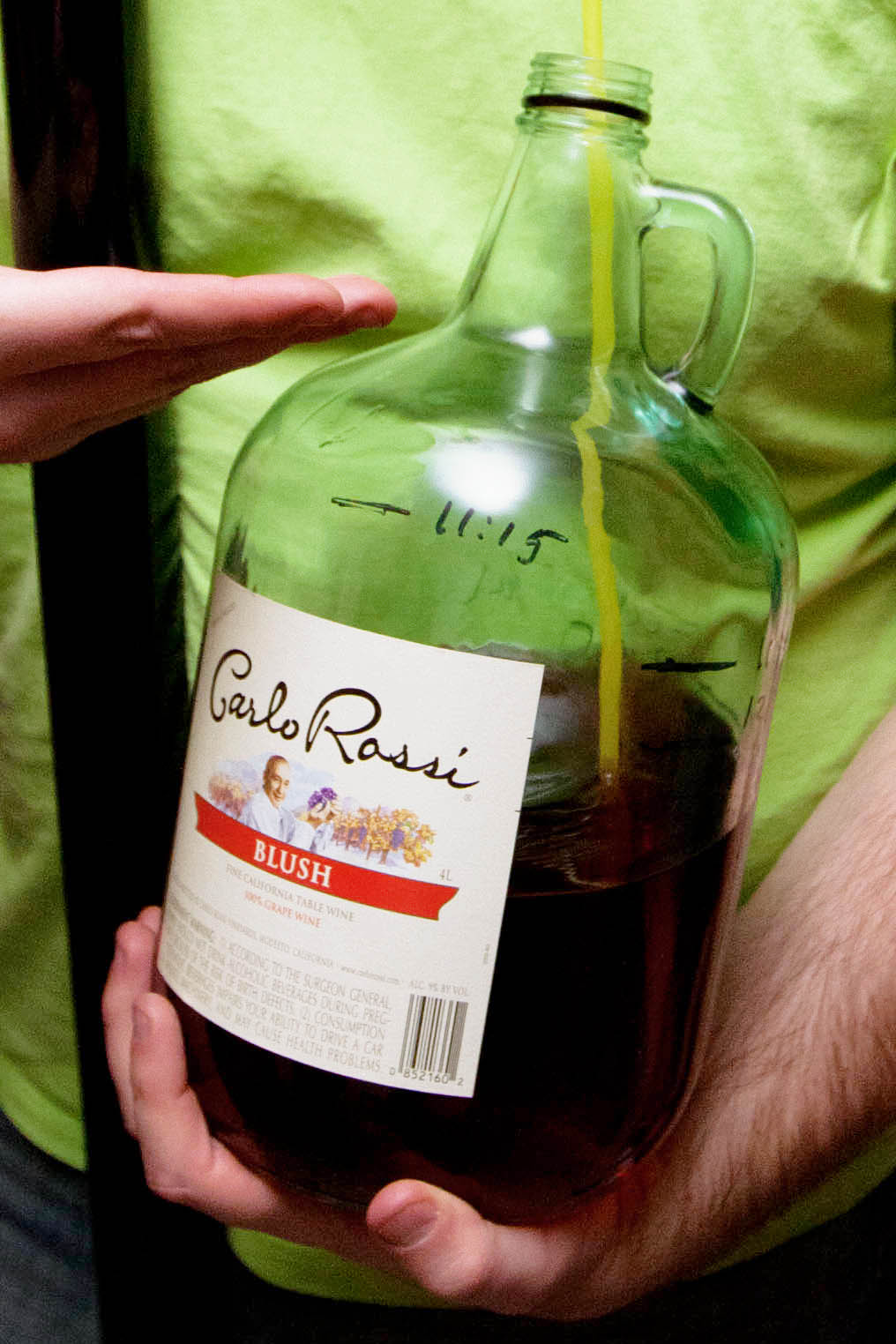
An open bottle of Carlo Rossi jug wine with a drinking straw

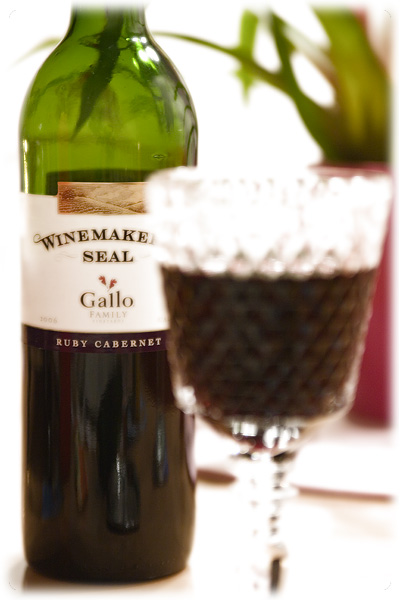
A bottle of Gallo Family Ruby Cabernet

In addition to the Gallo Family Vineyards brand, the company makes, markets, and distributes wine under more than 100 other labels.

The company also makes the low-end fortified wines Thunderbird and Night Train Express.

- André was one of the best-selling brands of sparkling wine in the United States in 2018. It is available in varietals including Brut, Extra Dry, Cold Duck, Blush, Spumante, Strawberry, and peach-flavored California Champagne, among others. André's California Champagne is bulk-fermented. Under a 2006 agreement between the United States and the European Union regarding wine labeling, André is permitted to continue using the term "Champagne" on its labels under a grandfather clause. One champagne expert said the wine is "like ginger ale – pale yellow in color, lemony and on the sweet side, with maybe an apple flavor as well and low bubbles".
- Carlo Rossi is a brand of wine produced by the E. & J. Gallo Winery. Introduced in 1962 as Carlo Rossi Red Mountain wine, the "Red Mountain" part was retired and removed from most of the brand's labels in 1975. The brand was named after Charles Rossi, who appeared in television advertisements for the brand in the 1970s. Carlo Rossi is referenced in popular culture in E-40's single, "Carlos Rossi," and also in Lil B's song, "Swag Like Ohio".
- Boone's Farm was formerly a brand of apple wine produced by the E. & J. Gallo Winery. Now, flavors are malt-based instead of wine-based due to changes in tax laws. The brand saw success within college campuses due to its low price. In some US states, such as Utah, some Boone's Farm products are labeled as malt beverages and not as flavored apple/citrus wine products, as some state liquor laws prohibit the sale of wine in grocery and convenience stores.
- Barefoot Wine, produced by Modesto-based Barefoot Cellars, was purchased by E. & J. Gallo Winery in 2005. The line offers 17 varietals and blends: Zinfandel, Shiraz, Merlot, Pinot noir, Cabernet Sauvignon, White Zinfandel, Moscato, Pinot grigio, Sauvignon blanc, Chardonnay, Riesling, Sweet Red, Brut Cuvee Chardonnay sparkling wine, Extra Dry sparkling wine, Pinot Grigio sparkling wine, Moscato Spumante, and Pink Cuvee sparkling wine. In January 2020, Barefoot Wine announced the launch of a line of wine-infused hard seltzer.

=== Additional brands ===
==== A–B ====
- Agave Loco LLC
- Alamos – distributor
- Allegrini
- Amelia
- Anapamu
- Apothic
- Arbor Mist
- Argiano – Exclusive distribution rights in the US
- Asti Winery
- Ballatore
- Bartles & Jaymes
- Bear Flag
- Bella Sera
- Bev
- Black Box
- Black Swan
- Blackstone
- Blufeld
- Brancaia – Exclusive distribution rights in the US
- Bridlewood

==== C–E ====
- Camarena Tequilas
- Canandaigua
- Canyon Road
- Capri
- Carnivor
- Chateau Souverain Wines
- Clarendon Hills
- Clos du Bois
- Columbia Winery
- Covey Run
- Cribari Dessert
- Cribari Table
- Cribari Winery
- Cypress Ranch – Vineyard
- Dancing Bull
- Dark Horse
- DaVinci
- Delicia
- Denner
- Department 66
- Diseno
- Dolcea
- Don Fulano
- Don Miguel Gascon
- E. & J. VS Brandy (aka Easy Jesus)
- E. & J. VSOP Brandy
- E. & J. XO Brandy
- Ecco Domani
- Eden Roc Champagne
- Edgewood Creek Winery
- Edna Valley Vineyards
- Estancia

==== F–I ====
- Fairbanks
- Familia Camarena
- Fishers Island Lemonade
- Fleur De Mer
- Franciscan
- Frei Brothers
- Frutézia
- Gallo Family Vineyards Estate
- Gallo Family Vineyards Single Vineyard
- Germain-Robin Brandy
- Ghost Pines
- Gossamer Bay
- Gruppo Montenegro – Exclusive importer rights in the US
- Hahn
- Hearty Burgundy
- Hickenbothom Vineyard
- Hidden Crush
- High Noon Spirits
- Hogue Cellars
- Holly Nog
- Indigo Hills

==== J–L ====
- J Vineyards & Winery
- Jayson by Pahlmeyer
- Jermann
- J Vineyards and Winery
- John Barr Scotch Exclusive importer rights in the US.
- Jura Single Malt Scotch Exclusive importer rights in the US.
- La Marca
- La Terre
- Laguna
- Las Rocas
- Ledgewood Creek Winery
- Leftie
- Liberty Creek
- Livingston Cellars
- Locations Wine
- Louis M. Martini Winery

==== M ====
- MacMurray Estate Vineyards
- Madria Sangria
- Manischewitz
- Marcellina
- Mark West
- Martĩn Cõdax
- Maso Canali
- Massican
- Matthew Fox Vineyards (since 2004)
- Mattie's Perch [Cancelled/Dead 7/25/2014]
- McWilliam's [No longer with Gallo as of 2015]
- Mia Dolcea
- Milestone
- Mirassou Vineyards

==== N–R ====
- New Amsterdam Gin
- New Amsterdam Vodka
- Night Train
- Nobilo
- Northern Sonoma
- Orin Swift Winery
- Pahlmeyer Winery
- Palisades Vineyards – Vineyard only
- Peter Vella
- Pieropan – Exclusive distribution rights in the US
- Poggio Al Tesora
- Pölka Dot [Abandoned 2007]
- Primal Roots
- Prophecy Wines
- Proverb
- Rancho Real Vineyard – Vineyard only
- Rancho Zabaco
- Ravenswood
- Red Bicyclette
- Redwood Creek
- Red Mountain
- Red Rock Winery
- Renato Ratti – Exclusive distribution rights in the US
- Rex Goliath
- Ripple
- Rombauer Vineyards
- Root and Vine (for Sprouts in the US)
- Rumchata
- RumHaven

==== S–T ====
- Saint Clair Family Estate – Exclusive import rights to the US
- Sebeka
- Shackleton Scotch
- Simply Naked
- Sleepy Hollow Vineyard – Vineyard
- Snows Lake Vineyard – Vineyard
- Souverain
- Stagecoach Vineyard – Vineyard only
- Starborough
- Storypoint
- Sun Lake Vineyard – Vineyard only
- Sunseeker
- Talbott
- Taylor Country Cellars
- Taylor Dessert
- Taylor NY Table
- Tequila Komos
- The Dalmore Scotch Exclusive importer rights in the US.
- The Naked Grape
- The Ranch Winery
- The Tippy Cow
- Thrive
- Thunderbird
- Tisdale Vineyards
- Toasted Head
- Tornatore
- Tott's
- Turner Road Vintners
- Turning Leaf
- Twin Valley

==== U–Z ====
- V.N.O.
- Vella Wines
- Vendange
- Viniq
- Vin Vault
- Whitehaven – Exclusive distribution rights in the US
- Whyte & Mackay – Exclusive distribution rights in the US
- Wild Horse
- Wild Irish Rose
- Wild Vines
- William Hill Estate
- Winking Owl (for Aldi in the US)
- Wycliff Sparkling

== See also ==
- Gallo family
- Napa County wine
