= J Vineyards & Winery =

Coordinates: 38.57298°N 122.84262°W

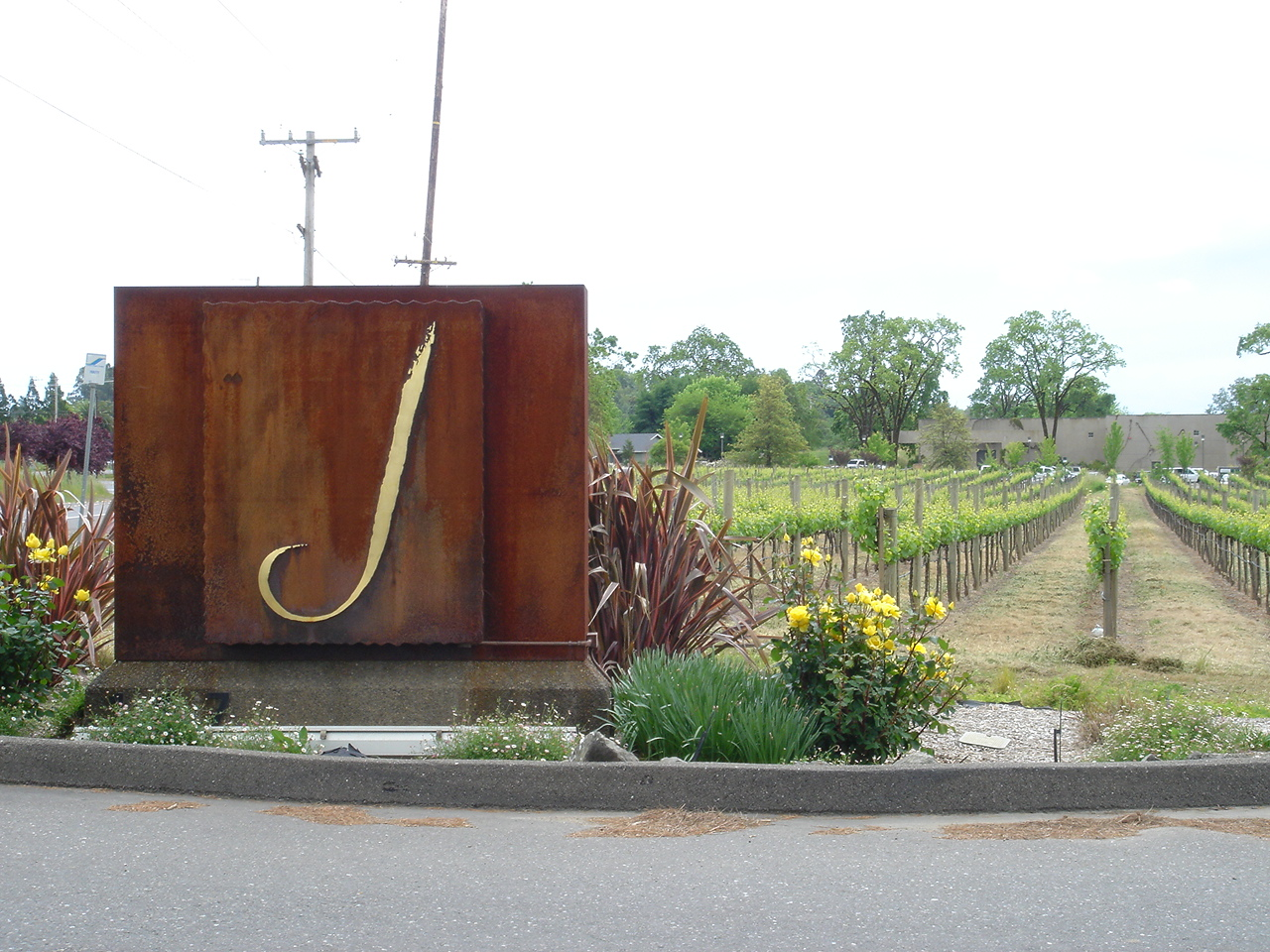
- Location: Healdsburg, California, USA
- Appellation: Russian River Valley
- Founded: 1986
- First vintage: 1987
- Parent company: E&J Gallo (since 2015)
- Website: http://www.jwine.com

J Vineyards & Winery is a California winery founded in 1986, and located in the Russian River Valley AVA of Sonoma County, California. It has been owned and operated by E & J Gallo since 2015.

J Vineyards & Winery was founded in 1986 by Judy Jordan. They are noted for their sparking wine, pinot noir, zinfandel, viognier, and pinot gris.
