= Bill Koski =

American baseball player (1932–2014)

- Pitcher
- Born: February 6, 1932; Madera, California, U.S.
- Died: July 12, 2014 (aged 82); Modesto, California, U.S.
- Batted: Right Threw: Right

MLB debut
- April 28, 1951, for the Pittsburgh Pirates

Last MLB appearance
- September 22, 1951, for the Pittsburgh Pirates

MLB statistics
- Win–loss record: 0–1
- Earned run average: 6.67
- Innings: 27
- Stats at Baseball Reference

Teams
- Pittsburgh Pirates (1951)

William John Koski (February 6, 1932 – July 12, 2014) was an American pitcher in Major League Baseball who played for the Pittsburgh Pirates. Listed at 6 ft 4 in (1.93 m), 185 lb (84 kg), he batted and threw right handed. Born in Madera, California, Koski was one of the many young players whose baseball careers were interrupted by military service in Korean War.

He starred at Modesto High School and, at age 18 in June 1950, signed a contract with the Pittsburgh Pirates, receiving a signing bonus of $6,000 (equivalent to $78,000 in 2024), just under the threshold to avoid being affected by the bonus rule.

He pitched in 13 games for the Pirates during the 1951 season. He posted a 0–1 record and a 6.67 earned run average, allowing 23 runs (20 earned) on 26 hits and 28 walks, while striking out seven in 27.0 innings of work.

In his only starting assignment, Koski lasted 4 1/3 innings against the New York Giants at Polo Grounds, giving up three earned runs on four hits and six walks, striking out two of the 23 batters he faced. The Giants won, 8–3, as he was credited with the loss.

′′T-Bone′′, as he was nicknamed, started 1952 back in the Minor Leagues, but his stuff impressed Pirates' owner Branch Rickey so much that the club tried to recall Koski to the big club early in August. Koski, however, had been drafted into the Army and needed to report for duty on August 21.

Following his discharge in 1954, Koski returned to the minors and pitched until 1957. In a seven-season career, he had a record of 39-48 with a 4.14 ERA in 138 pitching appearances.

After retiring, Koski moved to Modesto, California, where he worked as a draftsman for the Stanislaus County Planning Department. Besides, he stayed involved in amateur baseball as a coach in youth leagues and as the pitching coach at California State University, Stanislaus.

Koski died in 2014 at the age of 82 in Modesto.
