= Talbott Vineyards =

American winery located in California

- Location: Carmel Valley, California, USA
- Coordinates: 36°28′49″N 121°44′4″W
- Appellation: Santa Lucia Highlands AVA
- Founded: 1982
- Key people: Founders Robb Talbott and Robert Talbott Sr.
- Parent company: E&J Gallo
- Varietals: Pinot Noir, Chardonnay
- Website: www.talbottvineyards.com

Talbott Vineyards is an estate winery in Monterey County, California that specializes in the Burgundy varietals of Chardonnay and Pinot Noir.

== History ==
In 1982, the winery was founded in Carmel Valley by Robb Talbott and his father, Robert Talbott Sr.

== Vineyards ==
Talbott sources from two vineyards, Diamond T and Sleepy Hollow. The Diamond T Vineyard was planted by the Talbotts in 1982 with chardonnay on a mountaintop in Carmel Valley. Sleepy Hollow was first planted in 1972 in the Santa Lucia Highlands, and has a mix of pinot noir and chardonnay. The Sleepy Hollow Vineyard was purchased by Talbott in 1994, enabling them to produce wines exclusively from grapes grown on land owned by them—making Talbott an estate winery.

== Reception ==
Talbott's 1990 Sleepy Hollow Chardonnay was awarded a 100-point score by Wine Spectator in a retrospective tasting in 1997.
