= Mirassou Winery =

Coordinates: 37.3154°N 121.7770°W

The Mirassou Winery was a winery, founded in 1854 by Louis Pellier (1817–72) and his brother Pierre (1823–94) in what is now known as California's Silicon Valley, and for many years an icon of the agricultural heritage of the Santa Clara Valley. In 1881 Pierre Mirassou (1856–89) married Pierre Pellier's daughter Henriette (1860–1937).

The brand name "Mirassou" was purchased by wine industry giant Gallo in 2003, and the Mirassou family no longer controls its wine making process or marketing. Instead, the wines are made in the Modesto area, headquarters of Gallo. David Mirassou is employed by Gallo and markets the wine as a Mirassou family product. The Mirassou winery itself, in San Jose, California, was not part of the Gallo purchase but the land was sold and winery torn down. The original vineyards have been converted into housing developments.

Another scion of the family, Steven Mirassou, continues the family's six generations of wine-making in the Livermore Valley with his wine brands, Steven Kent Winery and Lineage. He is the only family member connected to the family winery who still owns a wine brand.

Steven Mirassou briefly owned the La Rochelle winery after purchasing the brand from his cousins, fifth-generation family members, Daniel and Peter Mirassou in May 2005. La Rochelle was sold in 2015 and is now in Sonoma County.

There was also a winery in Oregon owned by descendants of the Pellier and Mirassou family which branded as Pellier between 1985 and 1992.
