= Fiorenzo Bava Beccaris =

Italian politician

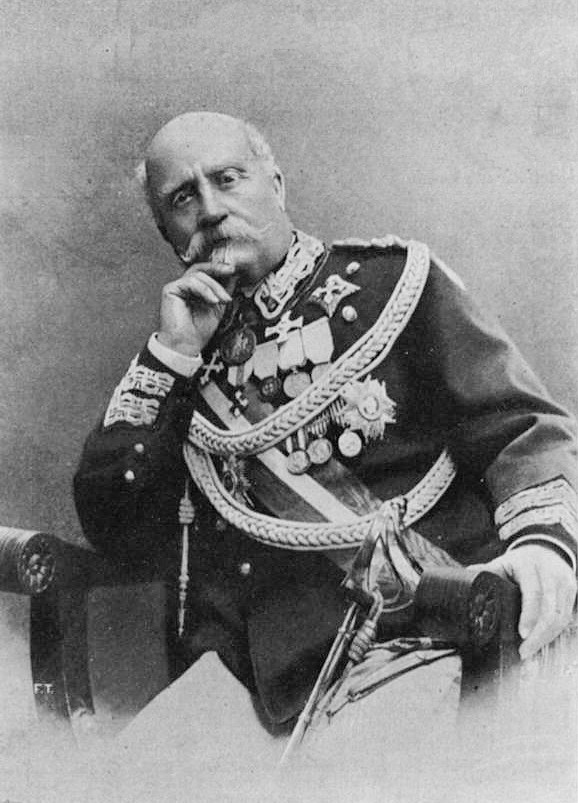

Member of the Senate
- In office 16 June 1898 – 8 April 1924
- Monarch: Umberto I

Personal details
- Born: 17 March 1831 Fossano, Piedmont-Sardinia
- Died: 8 April 1924 (aged 93) Rome, Italy
- Party: Historical Right
- Education: Military Academy of Turin
- Profession: Military officer

Military service
- Allegiance: Kingdom of Italy
- Branch/service: Royal Sardinian Army; Royal Italian Army
- Years of service: 1845–1898
- Rank: General
- Unit: III and VII Army Corps
- Battles/wars: Crimean War; 2nd Italian War of Independence; 3rd Italian War of Independence

Fiorenzo Bava Beccaris (Italian: [fjoˈrɛntso ˈbaːva bekˈkaːris]; 17 March 1831 – 8 April 1924) was an Italian general, especially remembered for his brutal repression of riots in Milan in 1898, known as the Bava Beccaris massacre.

== Biography ==
Fiorenzo Bava Beccaris was born in Fossano, and took part in the Crimean War and the Italian Wars of Independence.

In May 1898, when serious riots arising from high food prices broke out in Milan, the Italian government under Antonio di Rudinì declared a state of siege in the city. General Bava Beccaris, as extraordinary commissar of the city, ordered his soldiers to fire on demonstrators, who had erected several barricades during a strike. Artillery was also used. According to official figures 80 people were killed and 450 wounded. However, the opposition claimed 400 dead and more than 2,000 injured people while The New York Times reported 300 deaths and 1,000 wounded.

In recognition of his action Bava Beccaris received the Great Cross of the Order of Savoy from King Umberto I in June 1898. He was shortly afterwards appointed to the Italian Senate. During 1914, he warmly supported the interventionist party in Italy who wished to participate in World War I, (as they did on 25 May 1915). In 1922, he recommended that King Victor Emmanuel III grant power to Benito Mussolini and the National Fascist Party.

Bava Beccaris retired in 1902. He died in Rome in 1924.

== See also ==
- Bava Beccaris massacre
- Gaetano Bresci
