= Modesto High School =

Public school in California

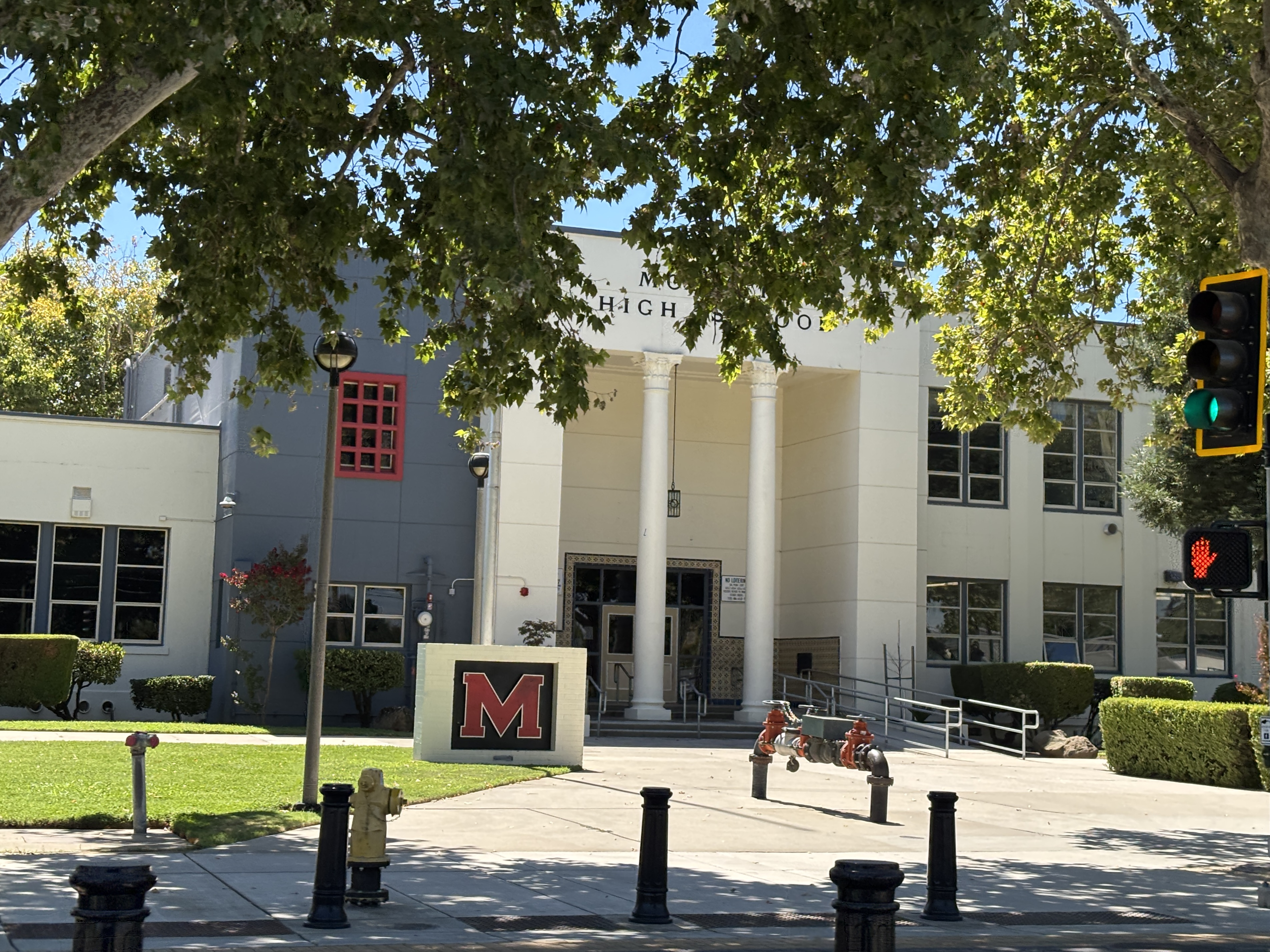

Location
- 18 H Street; Modesto; California

Information
- School type: Public high school
- Opened: 1883
- School district: Modesto City Schools
- Principal: Phuc Pham-Goulart
- Staff: 111.23 (FTE)
- Grades: 9-12
- Enrollment: 2,405 (2023–2024)
- Student to teacher ratio: 21.62
- Campus type: Urban
- Colors: Crimson, Black
- Song: Modesto Hymn
- Athletics: Football, Volleyball, Golf, Cross Country, Soccer, Waterpolo, Tennis, Basketball, Wrestling, Baseball, Softball, Track, Swimming
- Mascot: Panther
- Newspaper: Panther Press
- Yearbook: Sycamore
- Website: mhs.mcs4kids.com

Modesto High School is a public high school in Modesto, California, United States. It offers the International Baccalaureate Program and the Avid program, Performing Arts Program and was the first public school to do so in the Central Valley of California.

Modesto High School is the oldest high school in Modesto and among the oldest in California, marking its 100th year anniversary in 1983.

In 1883, Ruliff Stephen Holway saw the need for a high school that could provide for needs extending beyond a primary grammar education. According to Sol P. Elias, member of the first graduating class of Modesto High School students, R.S. Holway was "a young schoolmaster... with the advantage of a charming character and a sympathetic mind... zeal and personality... [who] guided the pupils almost through the entire course until his departure... to accept a professorship at the University of California." Holway, the school's first principal, was responsible for the education of the entire student body, playing a role of both teacher and administrator before he left to teach in the UC system. Forty pupils comprised the first class organized at the first building located at 14th and I Streets; after four years, ten of these students remained to take part in the first graduation of MHS students. In the succeeding years, the number of seniors receiving diplomas fluctuated greatly; the lowest number occurred in 1893 when no one remained in school all four years to graduate.

== Athletics ==
Modesto High School offers a variety sports on a seasonal basis:

- Soccer
- Football
- Water polo
- Cross Country running
- Golf
- Volleyball
- Tennis
- Cheerleading
- Basketball
- Wrestling
- Baseball
- Swimming
- Track and field
- Softball

== Notable events ==
- Modesto High Boys Soccer team made history during their 2021-2022 season. They remained undefeated and advanced through the playoffs to the CIF Sac-Joaquin Section Championship for the first time in school history.

== Notable alumni ==
- James Algar, an American film director, screenwriter, and producer. He worked for the Walt Disney Productions for 43 years and received the Disney Legends award in 1998. He is known for directing "The Sorcerer’s Apprentice" segment of Fantasia from 1940. After World War II he was asked by Walt Disney to direct the first True-Life Adventure. The film, Seal Island, won an Academy Award in 1949. 1929 graduate
- Richard L. Bare, an American director, producer, and screenwriter of television shows and short films. Directed most episodes of the television show Green Acres and seven notable episodes of The Twilight Zone.; 1931 graduate
- Jeremiah Brent, known in high school as Jeremy [Brent] Johnson, an American interior designer and television personality. He is married to fellow designer Nate Berkus and is known for the television shows Nate & Jeremiah by Design (2017), The Rachel Zoe Project (2011), Home Made Simple (2015) and Say I Do (2020). He has been featured on the cover of Architectural Digest, Harper's Bazaar and People magazine. 2002 graduate
- Erin Cafaro, 2008 Olympic gold medalist for women's eight crew; 2001 graduate
- Frederick Schiller Faust, American writer known primarily for his Western stories using the pseudonym Max Brand. 1911 graduate
- Ernest Gallo, winemaker
- Julio Gallo, winemaker
- Josh Harder, politician representing California's 9th Congressional District
- Bill Koski - baseball player.
- Jim McDonald (pitcher) - MLB player.
- Harve Presnell, actor and singer known for his run on Broadway as "Leadville Johnny" in The Unsinkable Molly Brown. He reprised the role in the 1964 film The Unsinkable Molly Brown for which he won a Golden Globe Award for New Star of the Year. Later films included Paint Your Wagon, Fargo, and Saving Private Ryan; 1951 graduate
- Red Strader, NFL player
- Louis Waldon, actor; part of Andy Warhol's Factory
- Gene Winfield, American automotive customizer known for work in film and television most notably creating cars for the film Blade Runner and television shows The Man From U.N.C.L.E., Batman, and Bewitched.; 1945 graduate
- Cy Young, winner of the gold medal for the javelin throw at the 1952 Olympics in Helsinki, Finland; the only American to ever win the Olympic gold medal in the javelin throw; 1946 graduate
