= San Francesco Saverio, Palermo =

Church building in Palermo, Italy

Church of Saint Francis Xavier
- Chiesa di San Francesco Saverio (in Italian)
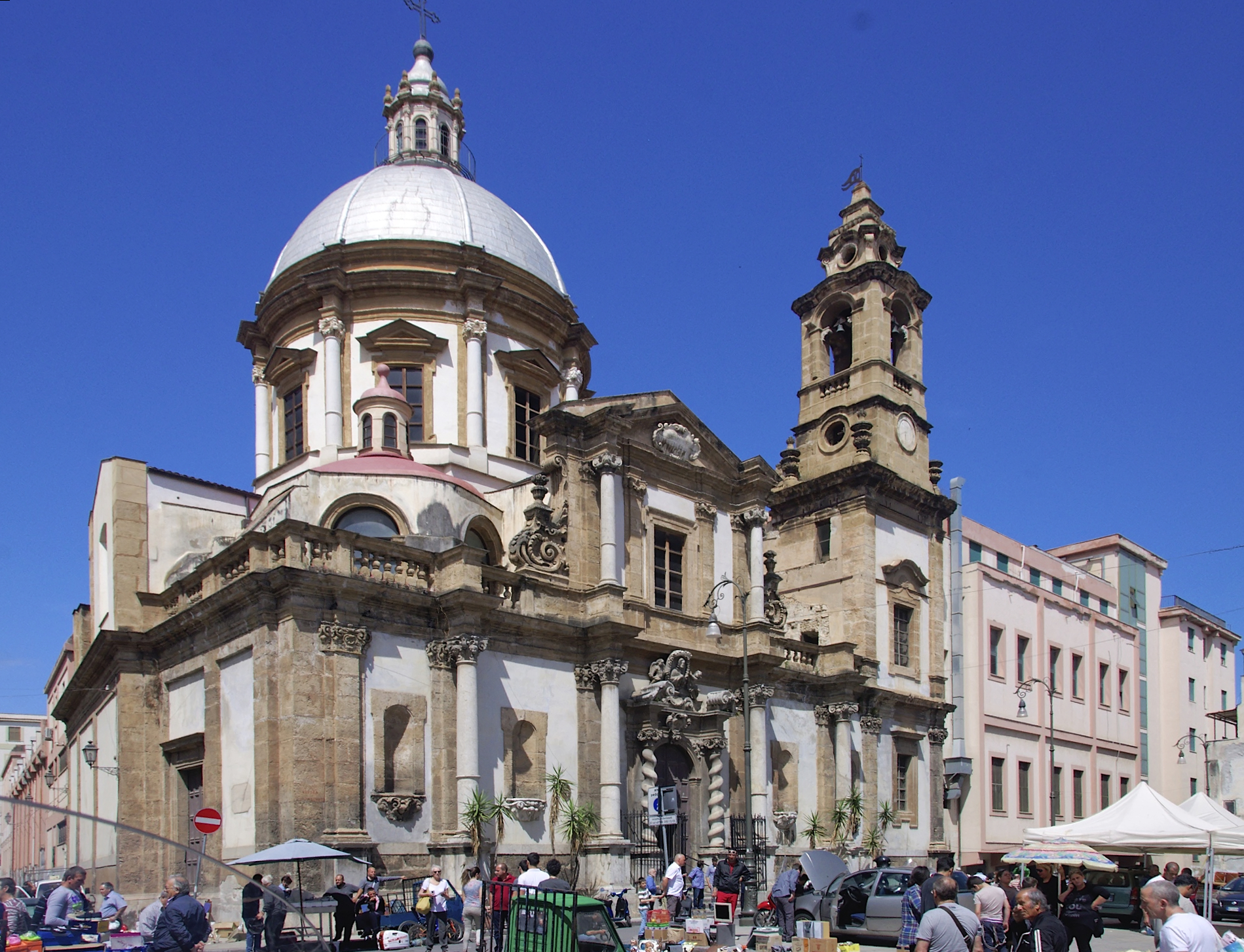
- Façade of the church

Religion
- Affiliation: Roman Catholic
- Province: Archdiocese of Palermo
- Rite: Roman Rite

Location
- Location: Palermo, Italy
- Interactive map of Church of Saint Francis Xavier
- Coordinates: 38°06′33.88″N 13°21′30.74″E

Architecture
- Architect: Angelo Italia
- Style: Sicilian Baroque
- Groundbreaking: 1685
- Completed: 1710

Website
- Official site

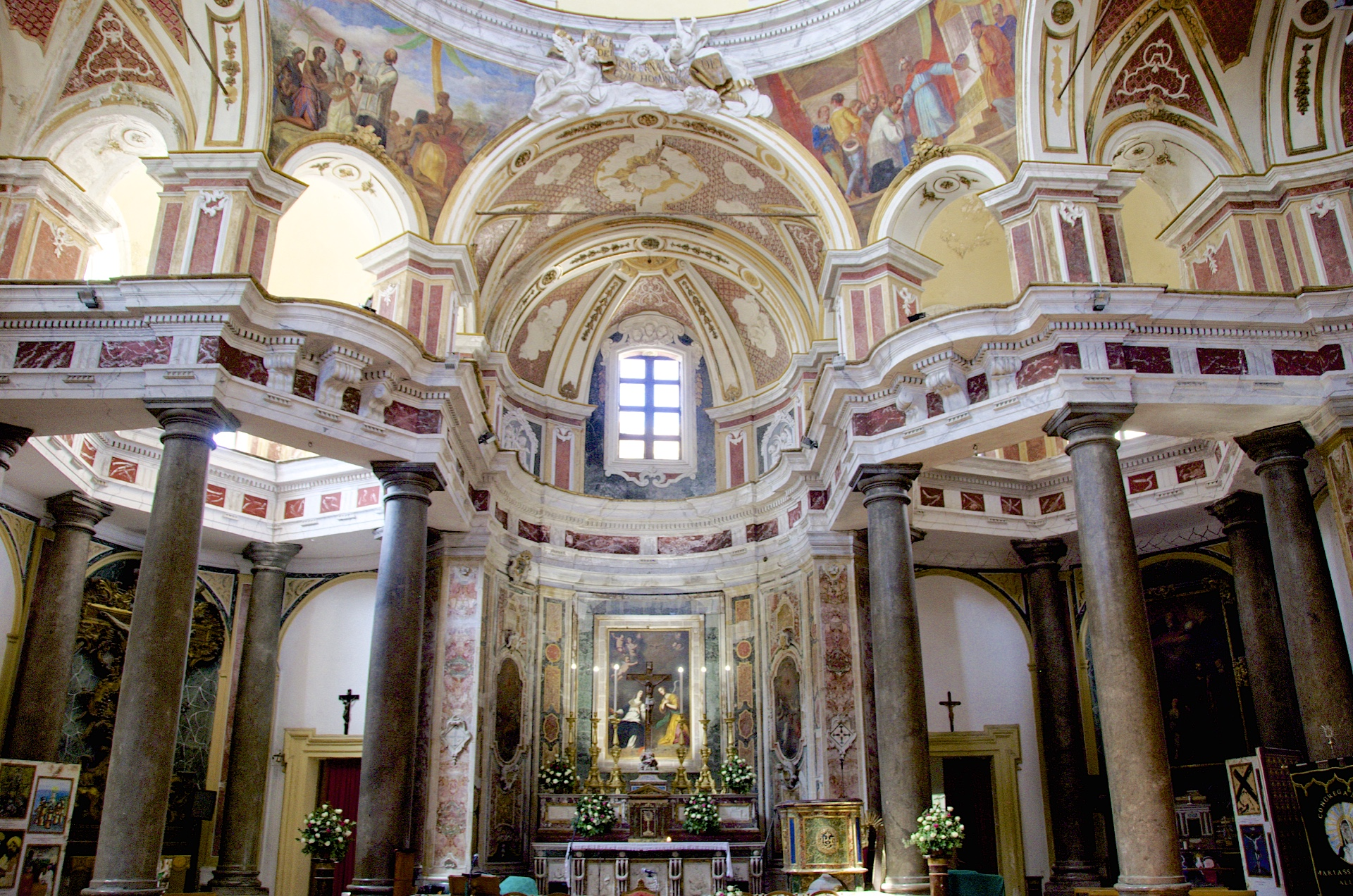
Interior of the church

The Church of Saint Francis Xavier (Italian: Chiesa di San Francesco Saverio or simply San Francesco Saverio) is a Baroque church of Palermo. It is located on the Street of the same name in the quarter of the Albergaria, within the historic centre of Palermo. The building is considered the masterpiece of the Jesuit architect Angelo Italia.

== History ==
On 20 September 1633, the Jesuits founded their fourth house in Palermo. It was destined to house seminarians in their third year (tertianship or third probation). The church is dedicated to the jesuit missionary, Saint Francis Xavier. The establishment of this church and seminary was patronised by Giovanna Aragona Ventimiglia, Marchioness of Giarratana. In 1634 the archbishop Giovanni Doria blessed the start of construction. By 1680 the residence was built. In 1685 the reconstruction of the church started. The design by the Jesuit architect Angelo Italia created the octagonal layout of the interior we see today. By 1710 the church was completed. On 29 November 1711 the church was consecrated by the archbishop of Mazara del Vallo Bartolomeo Castelli.

After the expulsion of the Jesuits from the Kingdom of Naples in 1767, the seminary was converted into a trade school for the lower classes (bassa gente). In 1800 it became a military hospital.

== Art and Architecture ==
The facade is notable for a number of detached columns. Flanking the portal are two spiraling Solomonic columns. Atop is a bas relief depicting the St Francis Xavier. The first chapel on the right is dedicated to the Crucifix. The second, the larger chapel, is dedicated to St Ignatius Loyola. The third chapel on the right is dedicated to the Maltese saint of San Calcedonio. On the left, the chapels are dedicated respectively to the Holy Family, St Francis Xavier, and Santa Rosalia.

== See also ==
- Casa Professa (Palermo)
- List of Jesuit sites
