= Robert Talbott =

American menswear brand founded 1950

Robert Talbott is a Californian menswear brand started in 1950 in Carmel, California by Robert and Audrey Talbott. Since 2021 the brand is owned by Newtimes Group, a privately-owned Hong Kong-based supply chain management firm.

== History ==
Audrey Talbott began hand‑sewing bow ties for Robert, and dress shirts joined the lineup in 1990, changing the brand from a tie specialist to a menswear house. The family established Talbott Vineyards after the business became successful. After Robert Talbott died in 1986, Audrey ran the business until she died in 2004. Their son sold the business to Relevant Brands Holdings, which later sold it to Newtimes Group. Former Eton Shirts creative director Sebastian Dollinger was appointed in March 2024. The brand appeared at Pitti Uomo at the June 2024 trade show. The company celebrated its 75th anniversary in 2025. Its “Hand Sewn” neckwear line is still made in Monterey, California. In 2025, Robert Talbott's flagship store reopened at 501 Madison Avenue in New York City; the brand previously had a store in the same space until 2018.

== Management ==
Alex Angelchik is president, and James Watson is SVP of brand development.
