= Samuel Sarfati =

Italian physician

Samuel Sarfati (died 1519), known as Gallo, was a prominent Italian physician and leader of the Jewish community in Rome.

== Family ==
Samuel Sarfati was the father of Joseph Sarfati (d. 1527), personal physician and medical adviser to Pope Clement VII, and a poet in Hebrew.

== Activities in Rome ==
=== Status and privileges ===
Originally from Provence, Sarfati moved to Rome in 1498. After settling in Rome, Pope Alexander VI extended privileges to him, such as permission to treat Christian patients and permission not to wear the special distinguishing Jewish badge that Jews were required to wear. He was a community leader and represented the Jewish community at the coronation of Pope Julius II in 1503.

=== Physician to the Pope ===
In 1504, Sarfati became the Pontifical Archiater during the reign of Pope Julius II. In August 1511, according to Erasmus, Sarfati successfully treated a "serious illness" of Pope Julius II, which some historians theorize might have been syphilis.

=== Other notable patients ===
In 1515, Sarfati became the physician of Giuliano di Lorenzo de' Medici.
