= Giovenale Boetto =

Italian painter

- Portrait of a Capuchin Friar, c. 1635, priv. col.
- Born: 1604; Fossano, Duchy of Savoy
- Died: 1678 (aged 73–74); Fossano, Duchy of Savoy
- Known for: Painting, Engraving, Architecture, Scenography
- Style: Baroque
- Patrons: House of Savoy

Giovenale Boetto (Fossano, 1604 – Fossano, 1678) was a Piedmontese engineer, fresco painter and engraver who flourished at Turin from 1642 to 1678. He was principally employed in embellishing the palaces and public edifices in Turin and other centres of Duchy of Savoy, with allegorical subjects.

== Biography ==
Giovenale Boetto was born in Fossano, near Cuneo, in 1604 to Damiano Boetto and Montarsina Pelazza. He studied painting and architecture in Savigliano under G.A. Molineri. Boetto probably worked with Baroque architect Ercole Negro at Savigliano. His early work, however, shows greater affinity to the simple forms of Ascanio Vitozzi and Carlo di Castellamonte. In 1622, he designed the Chapel of the Holy Rosary in the Church of San Vincenzo Ferreri in Bra, Piedmont. In 1635, he entered the service of Duke Victor Amadeus I, and between 1638 and 1645, he collaborated with the Flemish painter Jean Claret on decorating the Taffini d'Acceglio palace in Savigliano.

As an architect, Boetto developed a classicizing style that often relied on clean geometric volumes and simplified structural forms, which he would then contrast with highly meticulous decorative details, frescoes, or complex altarpieces. His most successful works are the churches of San Francesco Saverio, Mondovì (1665-1677), and Sant'Agostino, Cherasco (1668-1687), longitudinal in plan with a pronounced cross axis covered by a pendentive dome. As an engraver, he adhered to a realistic style, following in the footsteps of Caravaggio and drawing inspiration from the Neapolitan and Roman Bamboccianti, as well as Jacques Callot. A stark contrast exists between his engravings of the solemn pomp and ceremony of the ducal court and the intimate realism of his portraits, in which he displayed his personal version of the Caravaggist style. His engravings of the ceremonies surrounding the funeral of Victor Amadeus in 1637 are particularly dramatic, exaggerating the scale of architectural and funereal decoration, replete with royal and dynastic imagery as dictated by court ideology.

== Engravings ==
Farmer with a creel, c. 1635, Collezione d'arte della Fondazione Cassa di Risparmio di Fossano

Woman with a Sack on her Shoulders, c. 1635, Collezione d'arte della Fondazione Cassa di Risparmio di Fossano

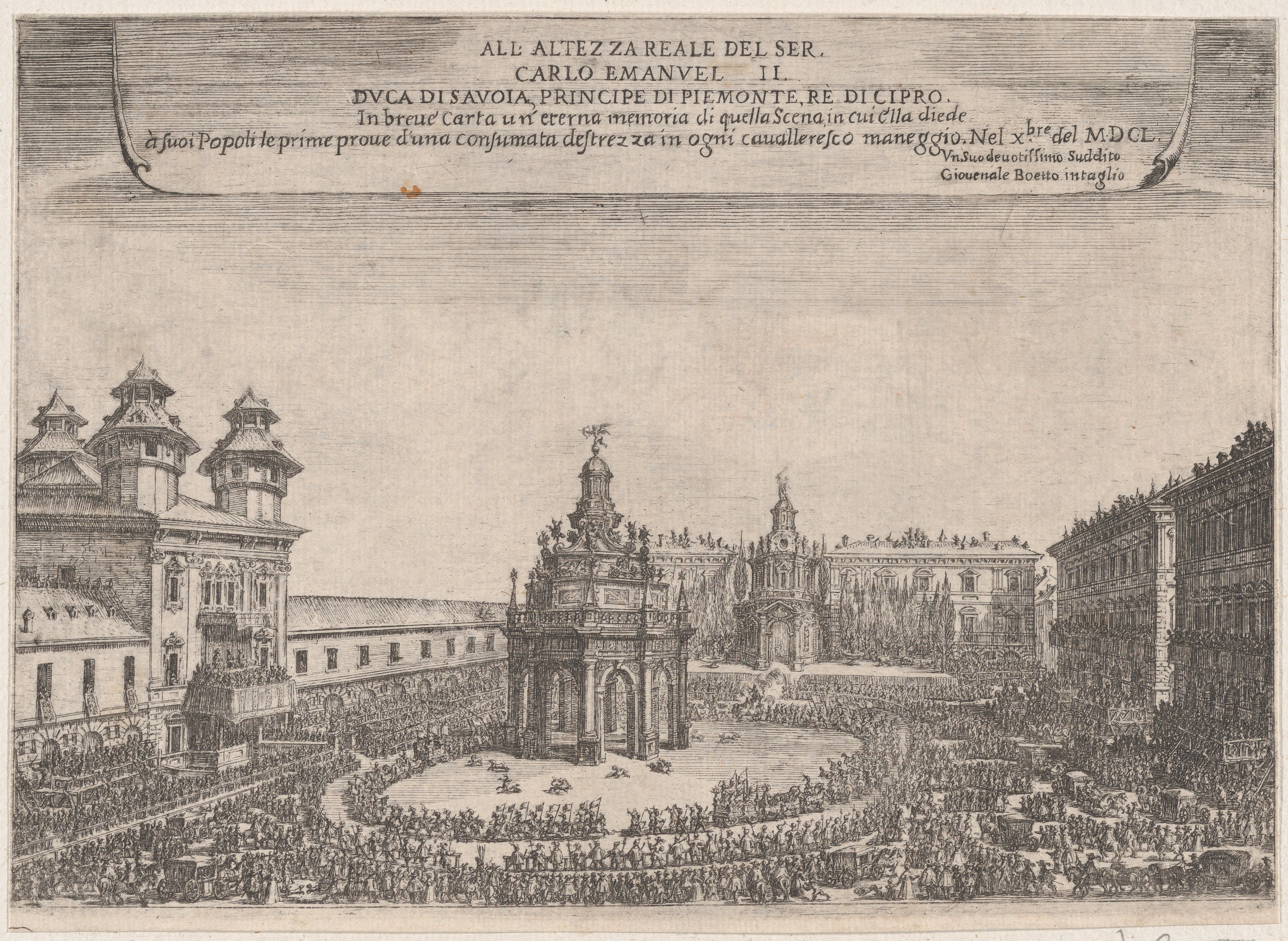
Festival in Turin, October 1650, Metropolitan Museum of Art, New York

Engraving from Giovanni Panealbo's Relatione della solenne entrata fatta nella città di Savigliano dalle reali altezze Carlo Emanuel II e Maria Giovanna Battista di Nemours, Turin, Zavatta, 1668

== Bibliography ==
- Griseri, Andreina (1969). "BOETTO, Giovenale". Dizionario Biografico degli Italiani (in Italian). Vol. 11: Boccadibue–Bonetti. Rome: Institute of the Italian Encyclopaedia. ISBN 978-88-12-00032-6.
- Wittkower, Rudolf (1958), Art and Architecture in Italy, 1600 to 1750, London: Penguin, ISBN 9780140560169
