= Joseph Gallo Farms =

Family-owned dairy in Livingston, California

Joseph Gallo Farms is a large family-owned dairy operation, and is prominent in California’s dairy industry. It is based in Livingston, California.

== History ==
Joseph Gallo Farms was founded in 1946 in the northern San Joaquin Valley by Joseph Edward Gallo following World War II.

After working in the dairy business, Gallo and son Michael built the company’s cheese plant in 1982. In 1995, Successful Farming Magazine called Joseph Gallo Farms “America’s largest dairy farm”. It is currently in the third generation as a family-owned/operated business.

== Sustainability ==
Joseph Gallo Farms is a prominent sustainable enterprise, receiving several honors and awards for their environmental practices. They also utilize conservation and renewable energies.

In 2004 they completed their first methane digester system, which uses biogas produced from cow manure to supply the majority of their plant's electrical needs. They have claimed they are working on a second digester, which would enable a completely renewable energy-powered plant.

== Vertical integration ==
The farm grows the majority of the feed for their own cows. They are the oldest U.S. cheese producer to be government certified “free of all artificial hormones.”

They use whey, a source of protein found in milk, and a byproduct of the cheese making process, to make whey protein isolate. Using an ultrafiltration system to purify and concentrate the protein, they produce WPI at about 90% pure protein for use in nutritional supplements.

== Awards ==
Joseph Gallo Farms has earned more than 100 awards and medals for their cheese and milk. In 2009, their provolone cheese was named "best in the world" at the World Cheese Awards.

They are strong advocates of sustainable business practices and have been recognized by the California Environmental Protection Agency with their 2009 WRAP Award.

== See also ==
- List of dairy product companies in the United States
