= San Francesco Saverio, Mondovì =

Church in Mondovì, Italy

Coordinates: 44.388154°N 7.829904°E

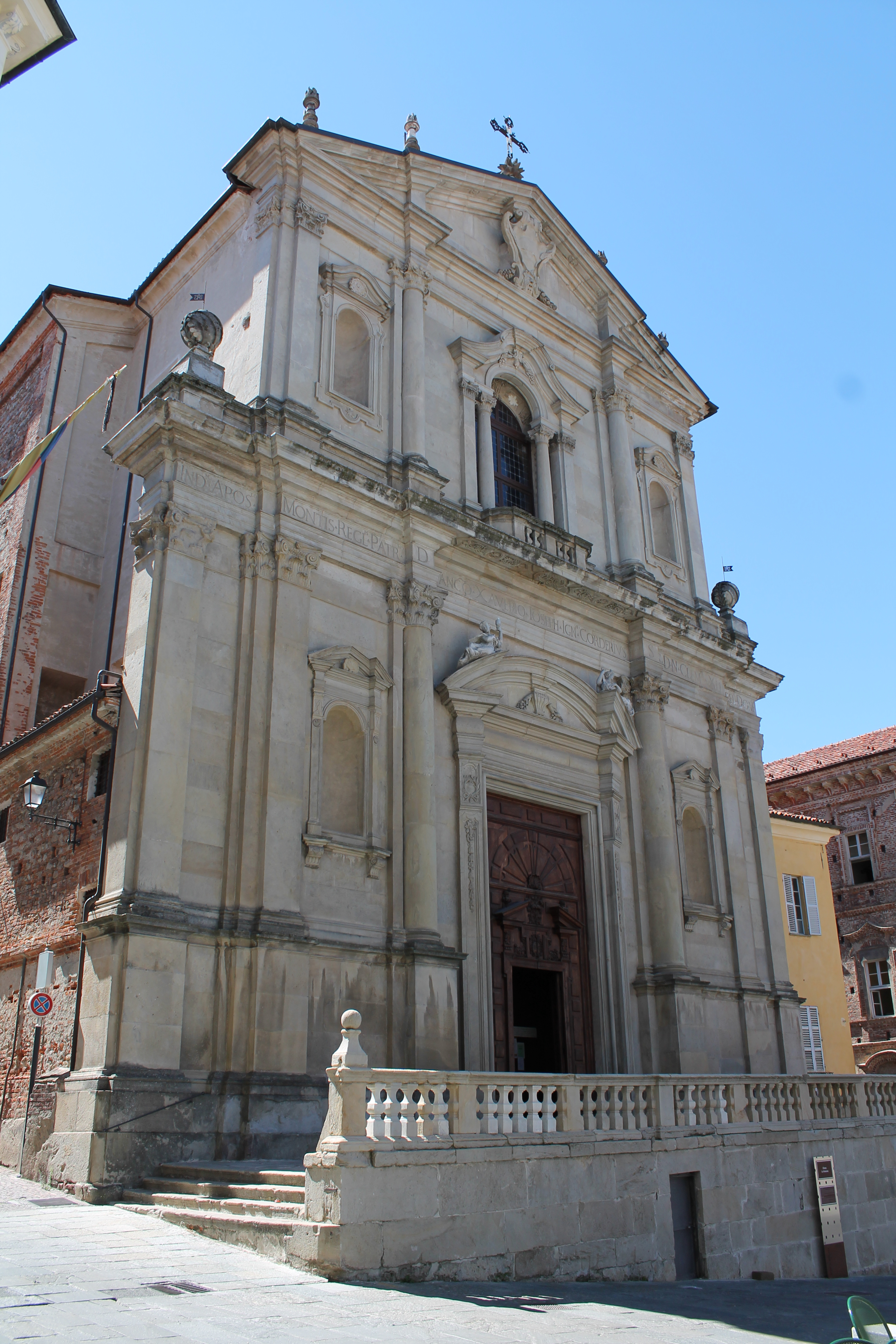

The Church of Saint Francis Xavier (Italian: Chiesa di San Francesco Saverio), also known as la Missione, is a Roman Catholic church building in Mondovì, province of Cuneo, Piedmont, Italy. Dedicated to saint Francis Xavier, it is part of the Roman Catholic Diocese of Mondovì.

This building was designed by the Fossanese architect Giovenale Boetto, with the façade in sandstone. Andrea Pozzo designed the external balcony, which helps to overcome the difference in height of the square. The church has a single nave and is richly decorated inside. The sculptural and pictorial decorations often blend together. The interior pictorial decoration, such as the faux gilding, faux bronze statues, and marble-painted columns, are also work of Andrea Pozzo.
