= Julio Gallo =

American businessman (1910–1993)

- Born: March 21, 1910; Oakland, California, U.S.
- Died: May 2, 1993 (aged 83); Tracy, California, U.S.
- Known for: Founder of E & J Gallo Winery

Julio Gallo (March 21, 1910 – May 2, 1993) was one of two of the founders of the E & J Gallo Winery.

== Biography ==
He was born on March 21, 1910, in Oakland, California to Joseph Gallo Sr. He had two brothers: his partner in the wine business, Ernest Gallo; and his youngest brother, Joseph Edward Gallo. Joseph Gallo Sr. died in a murder-suicide when he shot his wife and then took his own life. Julio grew up near Modesto, California and graduated in 1929 from Modesto High School. He married Aileen (1913–1999) and they had: Robert J. Gallo, and Susan Gallo Coleman.

He died on May 2, 1993, when the vehicle he was driving veered off a dirt road on his ranch near Tracy, California. The cause of death was a cervical spine fracture and partial dislocation caused by the blunt-force trauma of the crash.

== Awards and honors ==
- 1989 – Golden Plate Award of the American Academy of Achievement
- 2006 – Hospitality Industry Hall of Honor, Conrad N. Hilton College, Hilton University of Houston
