= Ernest Gallo =

American businessman (1909–2007)

- Born: March 18, 1909; Jackson, California, U.S.
- Died: March 6, 2007 (aged 97); Modesto, California, U.S.
- Occupations: vintner, philanthropist
- Known for: E & J Gallo Winery
- Spouse: Amelia Franzia Gallo
- Children: David Gallo (d. 1997), Joseph Ernest Gallo
- Relatives: Julio Gallo (1910–1993) (brother), Joseph Edward Gallo (1919–2007) (brother)

Ernest J. Gallo (March 18, 1909 – March 6, 2007) was an American billionaire businessman and philanthropist. Gallo co-founded the E & J Gallo Winery in Modesto, California.

== Early life ==
Gallo was born on March 18, 1909, in Jackson, California.

Gallo's grandparents immigrated from Italy to the United States. Gallo's father was Giuseppe Gallo, a.k.a. Joseph Edward Gallo Sr, and his mother, Assunta Bianco Gallo, a.k.a. Susie Bianco Gallo. Together with his uncle Michael, his father ran the Gallo Wine Company, a wine distribution company. His mother's family, the Biancos, were winemakers. Gallo's father operated a boarding house for the miners in Jackson, California and a saloon in Oakland, California.

In 1910, at one year old, Gallo lived with his maternal grandparents, Batista Biancos, in Hanford, California. At about age 6, Gallo returned to live with his parents.

After the 1918 prohibition, Gallo's father had to close the saloon business. Gallo's father bought a 120-acre ranch in Antioch, California and became a farmer growing 30 acres of grapes. Gallo worked in cultivating in the farm. By age 12, Gallo's father sold the ranch in Antioch and moved to a small vineyard in Escalon, California.

In the 1920s, his parents purchased a 40-acre farm near Modesto, California. Gallo's family also bought a 20-acre farm near Keyes. Gallo's father sold their grapes in Chicago.

Gallo had two brothers, Julio Gallo (1910–1993), and Joseph Edward Gallo, Jr. (1919–2007).

On June 21, 1933, Gallo's father shot his wife then killed himself.

Gallo graduated from Modesto High School in Modesto, California.

== Education ==
Gallo attended Modesto Junior College, but he did not graduate.

== Career ==
In 1926 at 17, Gallo worked for his father. Gallo harvested grapes and shipped them via railway to Chicago. By 18, Gallo was selling grapes in Chicago. During Gallo's travel from Chicago back to California, he met Giuseppe Franzia.

In 1933, shortly after the end of prohibition and the death of his parents, Gallo co-founded the E.&J. Gallo Winery, using $5,900 in borrowed cash from his mother-in-law (equivalent to $146,742 in 2025). He became head of sales, marketing and distribution.

== Philanthropy ==
In 1955, Gallo created The Ernest Gallo Foundation.In 2008, Gallo donated $800,000 to the University of Notre Dame, $600,000 to Stanford University, and $3.835 million to Lucile Packard Foundation for Children's Health. In 1980, Gallo also donated millions and created Ernest Gallo Clinic and Research Center in Emeryville, California, at University of California, San Francisco.

== Awards ==
- 1989 Golden Plate Award of the American Academy of Achievement
- 2003 Lifetime Achievement Award (given by Wine Enthusiast)

== Personal life ==
In 1931, Gallo married Amelia Franzia (died 1993). They had two sons: David Gallo (died 1997), and Joseph Ernest Gallo, the CEO of the E&J Gallo Winery.

Gallo was ranked 297th on the 2006 Forbes 400 list of billionaires, with an estimated wealth of US$1.2 billion.

On March 6, 2007, Gallo died in Modesto, California, aged 97, and is buried at St. Stanislaus Catholic Cemetery.
