= Joseph Edward Gallo =

California cheese-maker (1919–2007)

Joseph Edward Gallo (September 11, 1919 – February 17, 2007) was an American businessman, brother of Ernest Gallo and Julio Gallo, and owner of Joseph Gallo Farms, a producer of cheeses.

== Biography ==
He was born on September 11, 1919, in Antioch, California. His brothers were Ernest Gallo and Julio Gallo. He attended Modesto Junior College and then enlisted in the United States Army Air Forces during World War II.

He founded one of the largest family-owned dairy operations in the world, Joseph Gallo Farms, which produces dairy products including a variety of cheeses. Joseph was sued by his brothers and forced to stop using the Gallo name on his cheese, thereafter labeled Joseph Farms.

He died on February 17, 2007, from a series of strokes.
