= Central Valley High School (Ceres, California) =

Location
- 4033 Central Avenue; Ceres, California 95307; United States; 37°34′45″N 120°57′33″W

Information
- Type: Public
- Motto: Stay fly Hawks!
- Founded: 2005
- School district: Ceres Unified School District
- Principal: Casey Giovannoni
- Staff: 97.20 (FTE) (2020–21)
- Enrollment: 2,254 (2020–21)
- Student to teacher ratio: 23.19 (2020–21)
- Colors: Green; Maroon
- Nickname: Hawks
- Website: cvhsweb.ceres.k12.ca.us

Central Valley High School (also known as Central Valley or CV) is an American public high school for students between the 9th and 12th grade. It is a large school, with over 2,200 students. It was founded in 2004 to help alleviate the enrollment stress on cross-town Ceres High School.

Central Valley is located in Ceres, California in the Central Valley of California, and is the second high school in that city. The school curriculum is based on preparing all students for college with the graduation requirements matching the entry requirements of the University of California and California State University. The school offers 15 Advanced Placement courses with little prerequisite conditions in contrast to its cross-town rival, Ceres High School, who offers fewer AP Courses with strict prerequisites. As of 2016, the school is ranked the best high school in Stanislaus County by the U.S. News & World Report magazine for a second year in a row.

== History ==
With just over 47,000 residents, Ceres is still considered a small town. Originally, Ceres housed just one comprehensive high school, but as the population grew, the need to add a second comprehensive high school grew as well. Central Valley High School opened in August 2005 to address the growth and needs of the community. The school opened with roughly 800 students, growing to the 2020-2021 enrollment of 2,228 students. As the population of the school has increased, so has the number of students who qualify for free or reduced lunch (84%). Out of the 2,228 students enrolled, 84.6% are Hispanic, 7.2% are White, 5.0% are Asian-American, 1.2% are African-American, 0.8% are Filipino-American, 0.4% are Pacific Islander, 0.1% are American Indian, and 0.8% represent two or more races.

=== Academics ===
The site and district have invested time and funding to support active intervention teachers built into the school day to provide academic intervention to students across the core curriculum. Central Valley High School also supports a large population of English Language Learners (11.6%), and incorporates ELD support both within general education classrooms and in 18 sections of specialized ELD support.
