= Charles Shaw =

Charles Shaw may refer to:

- Charles F. Shaw (born 1943), founder of the Charles Shaw wine brand
- Charles Green Shaw (1892–1974), American painter and writer
- Charles Shaw (writer) (1900–1955), Australian novelist whose book Heaven Knows, Mr. Allison was adapted for film
- Charles Alexander Shaw (1944–2020), United States federal judge
- Charles Shaw (singer) (born 1960), rapper who sang vocals credited to Milli Vanilli
- Charles Shaw (British Army officer) (1795–1871), British soldier active in Portuguese campaigns
- Charles Shaw (journalist) (1911–1987), American journalist
- Charles "Bobo" Shaw (1947–2017), American jazz drummer
- Charlie Shaw (footballer, born 1862) (1862–1931), English footballer
- Charlie Shaw (footballer, born 1885) (1885–1938), Scottish football goalkeeper (Celtic FC)
- Charlie Shaw (American football) (1927–1994), American football player
- Charles Shaw (potter) (1832–1906), English potter
- Charles Thurstan Shaw (1914–2013), English archaeologist
- Charles A. Shaw (1831–1909), New England politician, inventor, and showman
- Charles Allan Shaw (1927–1989), Anglican priest
- Barry Shaw (barrister) (Charles Barry Shaw, 1923–2010), Northern Irish barrister
- C. Montague Shaw (Charles Montague Shaw, 1882–1968), Australian actor
- Sir Charles Shaw, 1st Baronet (1859–1942), British Liberal Party politician
- Charles Shaw of Tordarroch (1899–1978), British Army officer, Scottish officer of arms and clan chief

== See also ==
- Charles Shaw wine, a brand of "extreme value" wine
