= Ceres High School =

Coordinates: 37°35′45″N 120°57′21″W

Location
- 2320 Central Avenue; Ceres, California; United States

Information
- Type: Public high school
- Motto: Home of the Bulldogs
- Established: 1908
- School district: Ceres Unified School District
- Principal: Kimberly McNeill
- Teaching staff: 73.60 (FTE)
- Grades: 9-12
- Enrollment: 1,660 (2024–2025)
- Student to teacher ratio: 22.55
- Campus: Suburban
- Color
- Mascot: Bulldog
- Yearbook: Ceres High's Yearbook Account
- Website: http://chs.ceres.k12.ca.us/

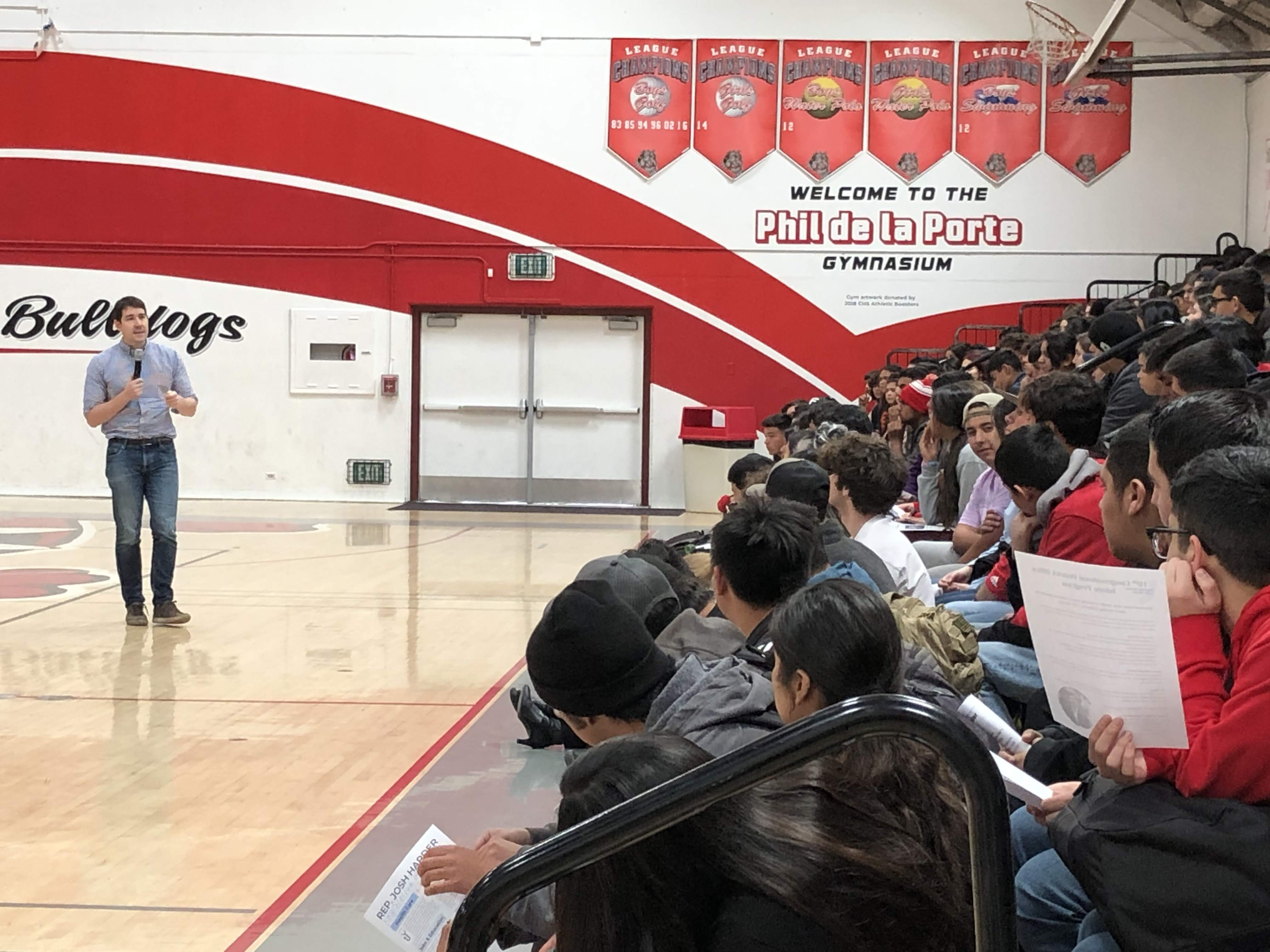
Josh Harder speaking at Ceres High School in 2020.

Ceres High School is located in the city of Ceres, which is located in the central San Joaquin Valley, 80 miles south of Sacramento and 95 miles east of San Francisco, in the heart of Stanislaus County.

== Background ==
Ceres High is one of two traditional high school in the district. Built in 1908, it is fed by three junior high schools and seven elementary schools. The ethnic trend of increased numbers of Hispanic students continues, with 48.4% of students Hispanic, 35% White, 2.4% African-American, 2.7% American Indian, 7.8% Asian-American, .6% Pacific Islander, and 1.0% Filipino-American. The number of students qualifying for free or reduced lunch continues to climb to 47% - a 4% increase. The number of English Language learners increased significantly over the past three years.

More recently Ceres High School began modernization in the summer of 2005. Some portable classrooms were removed, two gyms were remodeled, and the cafeteria was remodeled into a student center. The second phase of modernization will include remodeling the main office and library. The final phase of modernization will include the construction of a new performing arts building that will be used for school and community events.

Ceres High School had a decline in enrollment from last year to this year from 2387 to 1728 due to the opening of the second high school. Based on the last three years of data, the number of students enrolled in AP classes has slightly declined; whereas, enrollment in the honors classes has been steady the last two years. There has been a decline in the AVID program due to the previous administration deleting the program from the master schedule. While there has been a slight increase in the number of students enrolled in special education, there has been a significant increase in the number of English Learner students over the last three years. Ceres High School is a Title I school and has met its AYP for the last two years. CHS has not been placed under Program Improvement. For the last three years, CHS has met their API target.

In 2007, over 25% of the graduating class went straight to a four-year university.

A majority of Ceres High students are involved in athletics, clubs, organizations, or other student activities. Although the student mobility rate has been significant in the last year, ADA for the last three years is maintained at about 92%. Additionally, the CHS graduation rate has been at or above 89% for the same time period, with over 60% of graduates attending a community college. The number of students passing the CAHSEE has increased each year.

Less than 1% of CHS teachers teach outside their credentialed area. A majority of the teachers are CLAD certified and a majority are in compliance with Leave No Child Behind.

== Notable alumni and faculty ==
- Tom Berryhill (class of 1971), member of the California State Assembly and California State Senate
- Anthony Cannella (class of 1987), Mayor of Ceres (2005–2010) and member of the California State Senate (2010–present)
- Sal Cannella, member of the California State Assembly
- Dick Davey (class of 1960), college basketball coach at Santa Clara (1992–2007) and associate head coach at Stanford (2008–2012)
- Steve Gonzalez, American football player
- Wayne Hardin (class of 1945):, College Football Hall of Famer, former football and basketball coach at Ceres High
- Angel Rubio (class of 1993), football player
