= Angel Rubio (American football) =

American football player (born 1975)

No. 92, 68
- Position: Defensive end

Personal information
- Born: April 12, 1975 (age 51); Los Angeles, California, U.S.
- Listed height: 6 ft 2 in (1.88 m)
- Listed weight: 300 lb (136 kg)

Career information
- High school: Ceres (Ceres, California)
- College: Southeast Missouri State
- NFL draft: 1998: 7th round, 221st overall pick

Career history
- Pittsburgh Steelers (1998)*; San Francisco 49ers (1998); Cincinnati Bengals (1998); San Francisco 49ers (1998)*; Arizona Cardinals (1999); Las Vegas Outlaws (2001); Orlando Predators (2001–2002); Detroit Fury (2003–2004); Dallas Desperados (2004); Austin Wranglers (2005–2006)
- * Offseason or practice squad member only

Awards and highlights
- First-team Division I-AA All-American (1997); OVC Defensive Player of the Year (1997); First-team All-OVC (1997); 2× Second-team All-OVC (1994, 1996)

Career NFL statistics
- Tackles: 6
- Stats at Pro Football Reference

Career AFL statistics
- Tackles: 66.5
- Sacks: 6.5
- Fumble recoveries: 6
- Stats at ArenaFan.com

Angel Rubio (born April 12, 1975) is an American former professional football player who was a defensive end for one season with the Arizona Cardinals of the National Football League (NFL). He was selected by the Pittsburgh Steelers in the seventh round of the 1998 NFL draft after playing college football for the Southeast Missouri State Redhawks. He was also a member of the San Francisco 49ers, Cincinnati Bengals, Orlando Predators, Las Vegas Outlaws, Detroit Fury, Dallas Desperados, and Austin Wranglers.

== Early life ==
Rubio garnered All-District and All-League recognition at Ceres High School in Ceres, California.

== College career ==
Rubio played for the Southeast Missouri State Redhawks from 1993 to 1997, recording a total of 330 tackles. He set Southeast Missouri career records with 21.5 sacks and 44.0 tackles for loss. He earned American Football Coaches Association and The Sports Network first-team Division I-AA All-American honors as well as Associated Press and Football Gazette second-team Division I-AA All-American honors his senior year in 1997. Rubio was also named the Ohio Valley Conference Defensive Player of the Year in 1997 after recording 114 tackles and seven sacks. He garnered first-team All-OVC recognition in 1997 as well as second-team All-OVC accolades in 1994 and 1996. He missed the 1995 season due to a knee injury. Rubio was inducted into the Southeast Missouri Athletics Hall of Fame in 2014.

== Professional career ==
Pre-draft measurables
Height	Weight	Arm length	Hand span	40-yard dash	10-yard split	20-yard split	20-yard shuttle	Vertical jump	Broad jump	Bench press
6 ft 1 7/8 in (1.88 m)	300 lb (136 kg)	34 1/4 in (0.87 m)	10 5/8 in (0.27 m)	5.18 s	1.80 s	3.01 s	4.58 s	26.5 in (0.67 m)	8 ft 4 in (2.54 m)	23 reps

Rubio was selected by the Pittsburgh Steelers of the NFL in the seventh round with the 221st overall pick in the 1998 NFL draft. He was signed by the Steelers in May 1998.

Rubio was traded to the San Francisco 49ers on August 24, 1998. He was waived by the 49ers on September 22, 1998.

Rubio was signed by the Cincinnati Bengals on September 23, 1998, but released a week later.

Rubii was then re-signed to the 49ers' practice squad in October 1998. He was released by the 49ers on September 6, 1999.

Rubio signed with the Arizona Cardinals of the NFL on September 6, 1999. He was released on September 27 and re-signed on November 3, 1999. Rubio appeared in the final two games of the season.

Rubio was selected by the Las Vegas Outlaws of the XFL with the 181st pick in the XFL draft. He was named to the XFL's all league first-team.

Rubio was signed by the Orlando Predators of the Arena Football League (AFL) on May 25, 2001.

Rubio was traded to the Detroit Fury on November 6, 2002. He was released by the Fury on April 27, 2004.

Rubio was signed by the AFL's Dallas Desperados on April 29, 2004. He was released on September 29, 2004.

Rubio was signed by the Austin Wranglers of the AFL on November 8, 2004. He was released by the Wranglers on January 10, 2007.

== Personal life ==
Rubio's son Gabriel is a defensive tackle for the Pittsburgh Steelers, and played in college for the Notre Dame Fighting Irish. He is of Mexican descent.
