= Charles F. Shaw =

American businessman and former winery owner

Charles Frank Shaw Jr. (born September 15, 1943) is an American businessman and former winery owner whose name is used for Charles Shaw wine, a brand of inexpensive table wines.

Born in Michigan, Shaw graduated from the United States Military Academy at West Point with a B.S. degree in 1965 and was commissioned as a United States Air Force officer. After leaving active duty as a captain in 1969, he graduated from the Stanford Graduate School of Business with an M.B.A. degree in 1971 and became an investment banker in Houston, Texas. He became enamored of Beaujolais wine while living in Europe and moved to Napa Valley in 1974 to start a winery. In 1991 Shaw and his wife divorced and sold his original Charles Shaw label to Fred Franzia's Bronco Wine Company. The label had a good reputation, so Bronco used the name to market an inexpensive table wine.

Shaw moved to Chicago, Illinois, and found employment there working for the healthcare software company Heartbase. In 2003, he announced he was considering starting a winery in southwestern Michigan. He did so, founding Oerther Vineyard, which specializes in Riesling.

Shaw is conductor Robert Shaw's second cousin.

== See also ==
- List of wine personalities
