= Bianchi Winery =

Winery in Paso Robles, California, U.S.

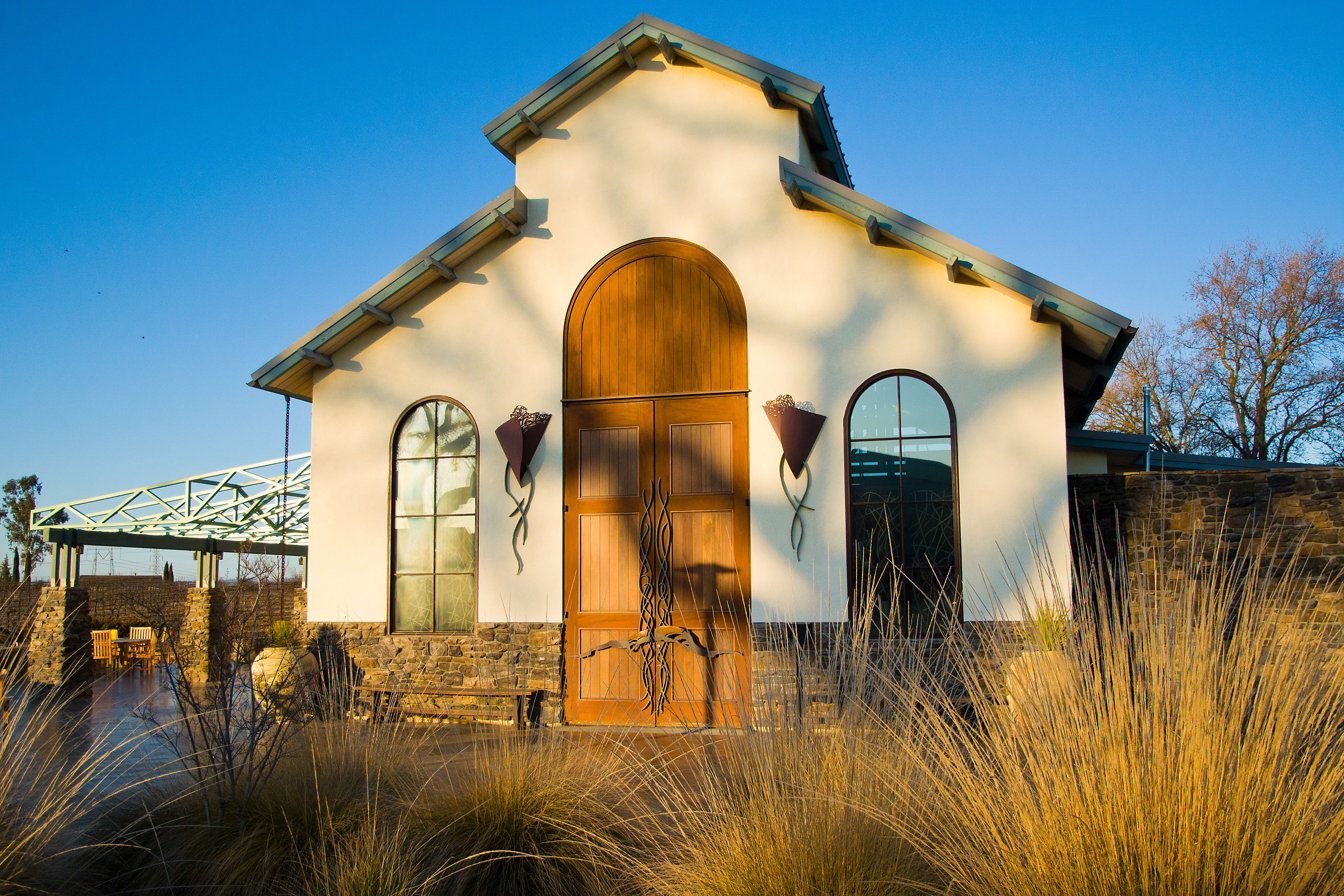
- Location: Paso Robles, California, United States
- Coordinates: 35.6505°N 120.5770°W
- Founded: 1974

Bianchi Winery is a winery in Paso Robles, California. The property includes the winery, a tasting room and a vineyard house for guest accommodations, all located among the estate vineyards. Bianchi Winery produces approximately 10,000 cases annually.

== History ==
In 1974, Glenn Bianchi and his father Joseph purchased a winery and vineyard on the banks of the San Joaquin River in the Central Valley of California. In January 2000, Glenn purchased 40 acres (160,000 m^{2}) of vineyards on the East side of Paso Robles to become the new home for Bianchi Winery. He then had the tasting room and wine facility / hospitality center built on the property.

Glenn's son Beau Bianchi is President of Sales and Marketing for the winery. Previously, he served as the winery's Vice President of Operations and oversaw human resource decisions and marketing.

Winemaker Tom Lane joined Bianchi Winery in April 2005. Throughout his career, Tom has earned several winemaking awards including the Dan Berger Winemaker of the Year in 1997 and Jerry Mead Winemaker of the Year in 1996. With a degree from UC-Davis, Tom began his winemaking career at Navarro Vineyards in 1985, where he produced Alsatian and Bordelaise-style wines. In 1992, he joined Concannon Vineyard as a winemaker and a manager. While at Concannon, Tom helped the winery earn hundreds of accolades, including Wine and Spirits Magazine Winery of the Year in 1995 and 1997.

== Wines ==
Bianchi's Heritage Selection wines each exhibit characteristics of the terroir of Bianchi's ranches. These wines feature estate-grown varietal grapes including Cabernet Sauvignon, Merlot, Syrah, as well as Zinfandel.

The Signature Selection wines are made with sourced grapes from select vineyards in Paso Robles and along the Central Coast. Special lots are blended and include a Santa Barbara Chardonnay, Arroyo Grande Pinot grigio, Santa Maria Pinot noir, Paso Robles Petite Sirah and embracing the Bianchi's Italian heritage, a Sangiovese and Refosco.
