= Franzia =

Wine brand (founded 1906)

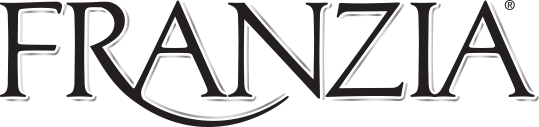

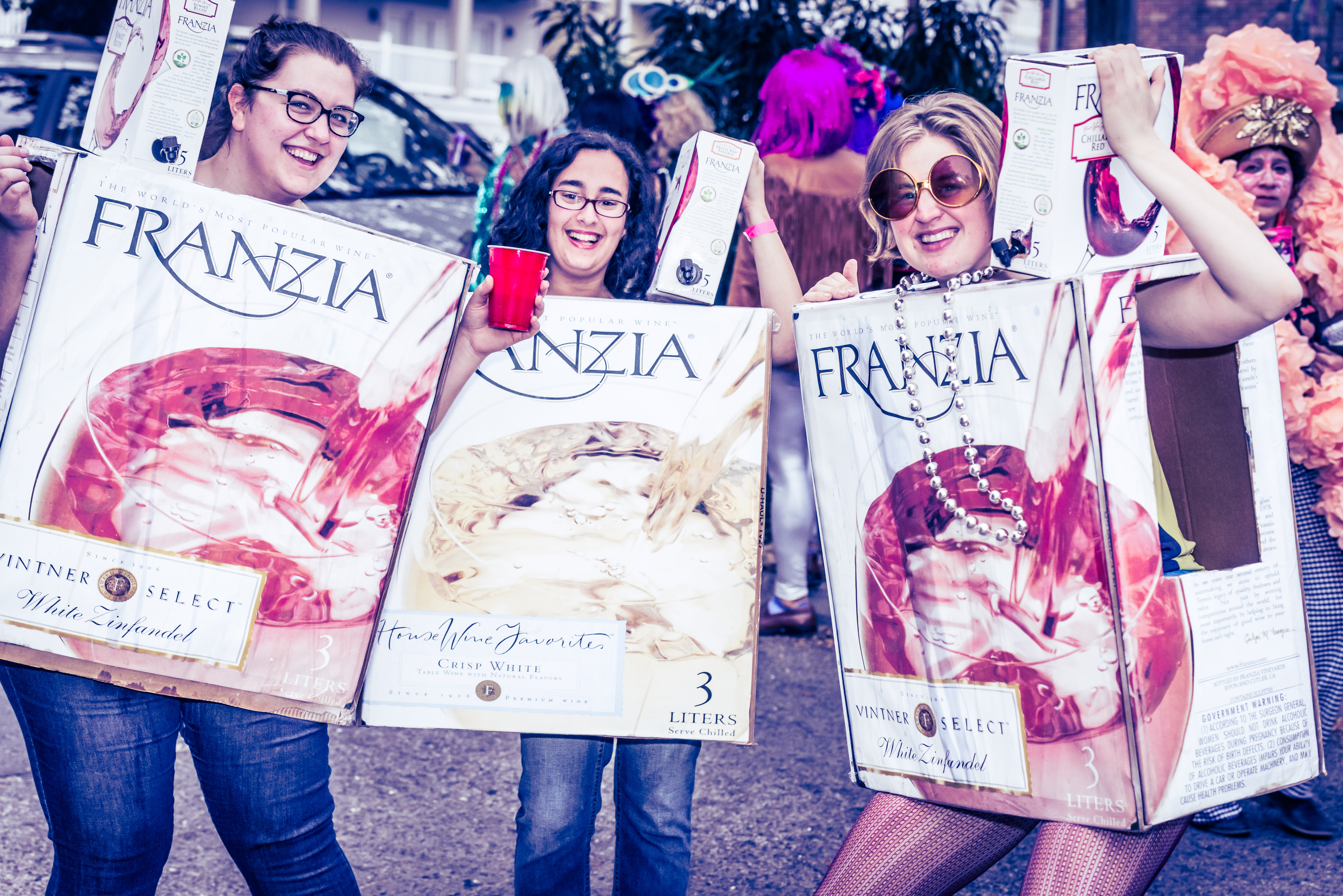
- Mardi Gras Revelers Dressed As Franzia Box Wine
- Industry: Wine
- Founded: 1906
- Founder: Teresa Franzia
- Owner: The Wine Group
- Parent: The Wine Group
- Website: franzia.com

Franzia is a brand of wine produced by The Wine Group, known for its box wines sold in 3 and 5-liter cartons. Franzia wines, throughout their history, were known as affordable table wines, popular in the 1960s and 1970s as "jug wine", and now as "box wine". The Wine Group is the third largest wine company in the world, behind Constellation Brands and the E&J Gallo Winery. The Franzia brand today has no business relationship with Fred Franzia of the Bronco Wine Company, known for its low-cost Charles Shaw wines. The Franzia family sold the brand to Coca-Cola in 1973 when Fred Franzia was in his early adult years; and it was sold to The Wine Group in 1981.

Teresa Franzia (born Teresa Carrara, 1879–1949) founded the Franzia Wine Company in 1906. Teresa's daughter, Amelia Franzia Gallo, was the wife of winemaker Ernest Gallo. Teresa lent Ernest the money to start his company.

== History ==
The brand was originally named after the Franzia family, who began growing grapes in California in 1892 and making wine in 1933 after the repeal of prohibition, later operating as the Franzia Brothers Winery, a Central Valley winery in Ripon, California. In 1973, Coca-Cola agreed to acquire the Franzia Brothers Winery for stock valued at about $49.3 million. As part of the acquisition, the Franzias were prohibited from using their name in future winemaking businesses—The Franzia Brand, prominent on the boxed wines, is today unconnected to the family, who have subsequently opened a business called the Bronco Wine Company. In 1981, the Coca-Cola Company agreed to sell the wine business of the Coca-Cola Bottling Company of New York (which included the Franzia Brothers Winery alongside the Mogen David Wine Corporation and Tribuno Wines Inc.), in a management buyout involving the top-level managers of the bottler's wine business and the First Boston Corporation.

== Vineyard ==
Franzia is produced by The Wine Group, which is based at Concannon Vineyard in San Francisco's East Bay, but operates 13 wineries in California, New York and Australia.

== Wines ==
=== Red Wines ===
- Bold and Jammy Cab
- Burgundy
- Cabernet Sauvignon
- Chianti
- Chillable Red
- Dark Red Blend
- Fruity Red Sangria
- Merlot
- Pinot Noir/Carmenere

=== White Wines ===
- Chablis
- Chardonnay
- Crisp White
- Moscato
- Pinot Grigio/Colombard
- Refreshing White
- Rich & Buttery
- Sauvignon Blanc

=== Blush Wines ===
- Pink Moscato
- Rosé
- Sunset Blush
- White Merlot
- White Zinfandel

== In popular culture ==
Oregon State University students organize the Tour de Franzia, a costumed bike parade inspired by the brand's namesake. The parade attracts students, local residents, and out-of-towners and occurs every term. Similarly, students at Wesleyan University organize an unofficial campus scavenger hunt involving boxed wine.

== See also ==
- Bronco Wine Company
