= Concannon Vineyard =

Winery in the Livermore Valley of California

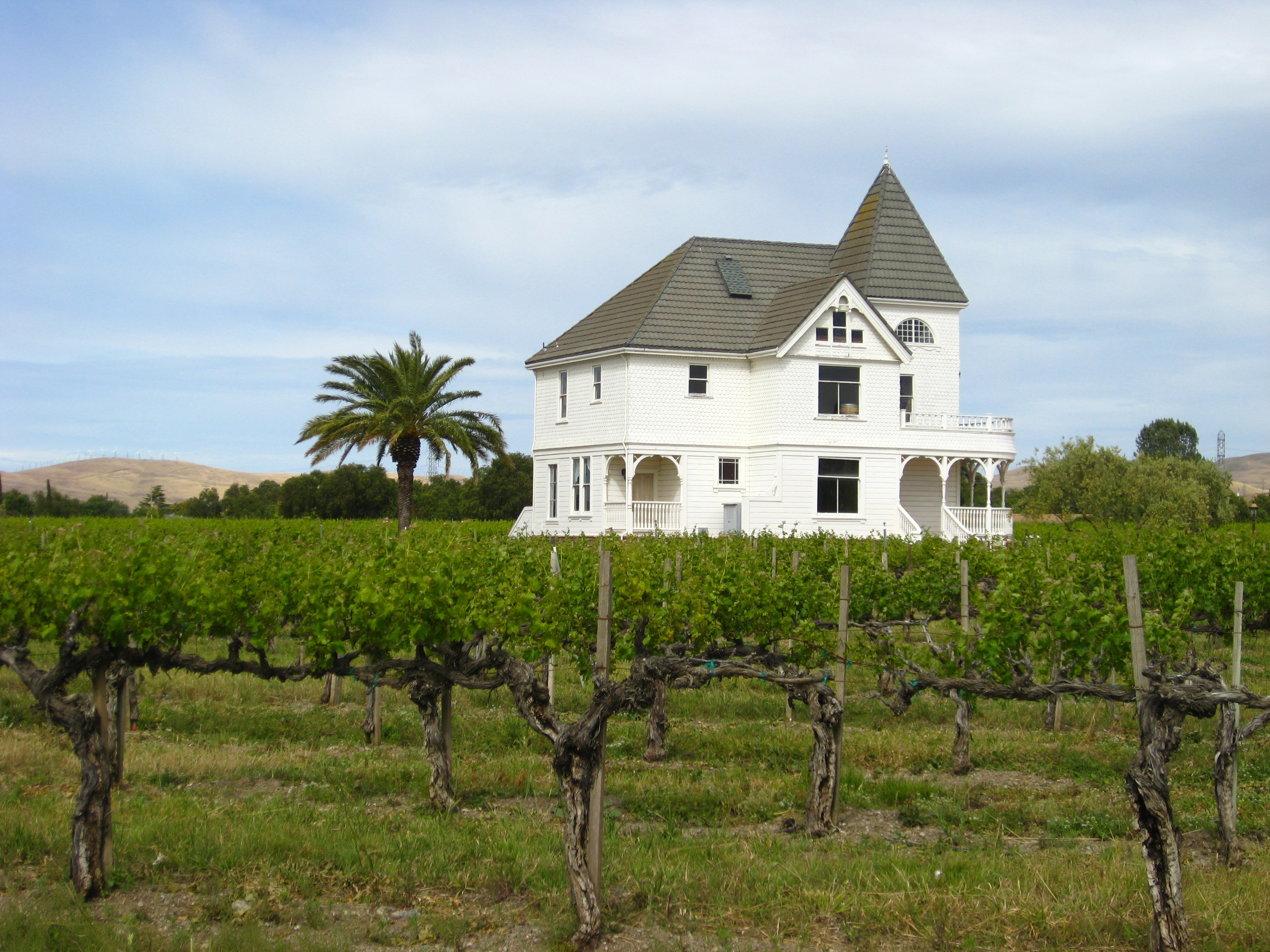
- Victorian house on Concannon Vineyards estate

- Location within California
- 37.666767°N 121.739667°W
- Location: 4590 Tesla Rd., Livermore, California

History
- Built: 1883

Site notes
- Governing body: Private

California Historical Landmark
- Designated: April 28, 1958
- Reference no.: 641

Concannon Vineyard is a historic winery located in Livermore Valley, California, and one of the oldest continuously operating wineries in the state. Founded in 1883 by Irish immigrant James Concannon, the winery helped pioneer the production of Bordeaux varietals in California through the direct importation of vine cuttings from renowned French estates, including Château Margaux and Château d'Yquem. Concannon is recognized as the first winery to commercially bottle Petite Sirah as a varietal wine in 1961, helping establish the grape's identity in the United States.

The winery also played a pivotal role in the development of California Cabernet Sauvignon. In collaboration with the University of California, Davis during the 1960s, Concannon helped develop the certified Cabernet Sauvignon selections now known as Concannon Clones 7, 8, and 11, which became some of the most widely planted Cabernet Sauvignon clones in California and contributed significantly to the expansion of premium Cabernet vineyards throughout the state.

Since December 2024, Concannon Vineyard has been owned by Lemmons Family Vineyards. Under the ownership of Tom and Paige Lemmons, the estate has undergone significant investment in vineyard redevelopment, hospitality, and winemaking. In 2026, Lemmons Family Vineyards acquired neighboring Cuda Ridge Wines, making the Concannon estate home to both the Concannon Vineyard and Cuda Ridge brands.

== History ==
Concannon was founded in 1883 by an Irish immigrant, James Concannon of Inishmaan, County Galway. James imported a group of cuttings from Château Margaux in 1893. James planted a large area of his Livermore vineyard solely with the imported vines. In the 1960s, most of the California vintners were confronted with an attack of phylloxera Closer inspection revealed that the vines descended from the 1893 cuttings looked healthy, while those that were at least partly derived from other grapes appeared to have been preferentially attacked by the virus.

In 1965, Jim Concannon, who was then in charge of Concannon's research and development, contacted Dr. Harold Olmo at UC Davis about establishing a program to clone some of the 1893 vines at Concannon's Livermore Vineyard. Dr. Olmo, Professor Curt Alley and Jim Concannon prepared a test bed where they could closely monitor specimens of the grapes descended from these wines. The three collaborators then took three cuttings from a single vine (Note: The vine was thereafter identified as the "...'Concannon Mother Vine' while the wine produced by each specimen was named "Concannon Clone Specimen 7," "Concannon Clone Specimen 8" and "Concannon Clone Specimen 11.") The vine specimens were heat treated to remove any trace of viral disease, then propagated under close observation at the Oakville Campus of UC Davis. UC Davis formally registered the wines to the wine industry under their code names between 1970 and 1974. This research program is credited with creating Concannon Cabernet Clones 7, 8 and 11, which now account for an estimated 80% of all cabernet sauvignon produced in the state of California. According to UC Davis, Its success in producing and selling sacramental or altar wine for the Roman Catholic Church helped it to survive national Prohibition. Grape cuttings from this vineyard were introduced to Mexico between 1889 and 1904 for the improvement of its commercial viticulture. As such, the vineyard has been designated a California Historical Landmark (#641).

In March 1988, British brewing giant Guinness PLC (Now Diageo PLC) agreed Thursday to sell Concannon Vineyards to its wine maker, Sergio Traverso. Guinness acquired Concannon in 1986 when it bought the winery’s parent company, Distillers Co.

Concannon Vineyard was bought by Tesla Vineyards, an investment group that also owned the Wente Vineyards in 1992. The investment group included members of the Tesla family. In July 1992, The Wine Group reportedly bought the Concannon operation from Tesla for an undisclosed price. (Note: The Wine Group, based in San Francisco, was described as one of the largest wine producers in the United States. Its other brands included Franzia, Mogen David, Glen Ellen and Corbett Canyon.) At the time, Concannon reportedly was producing about 55,000 cases a year. The sale included the brand, inventories, the winery and 170 acres (69 ha) of vineyards.

In December 2024, The Wine Group sold Concannon to Lemmons Family Vineyards LLC for an undisclosed price.

== See also ==
- Uí Díarmata
