= Bronco Wine Company =

California wine producer

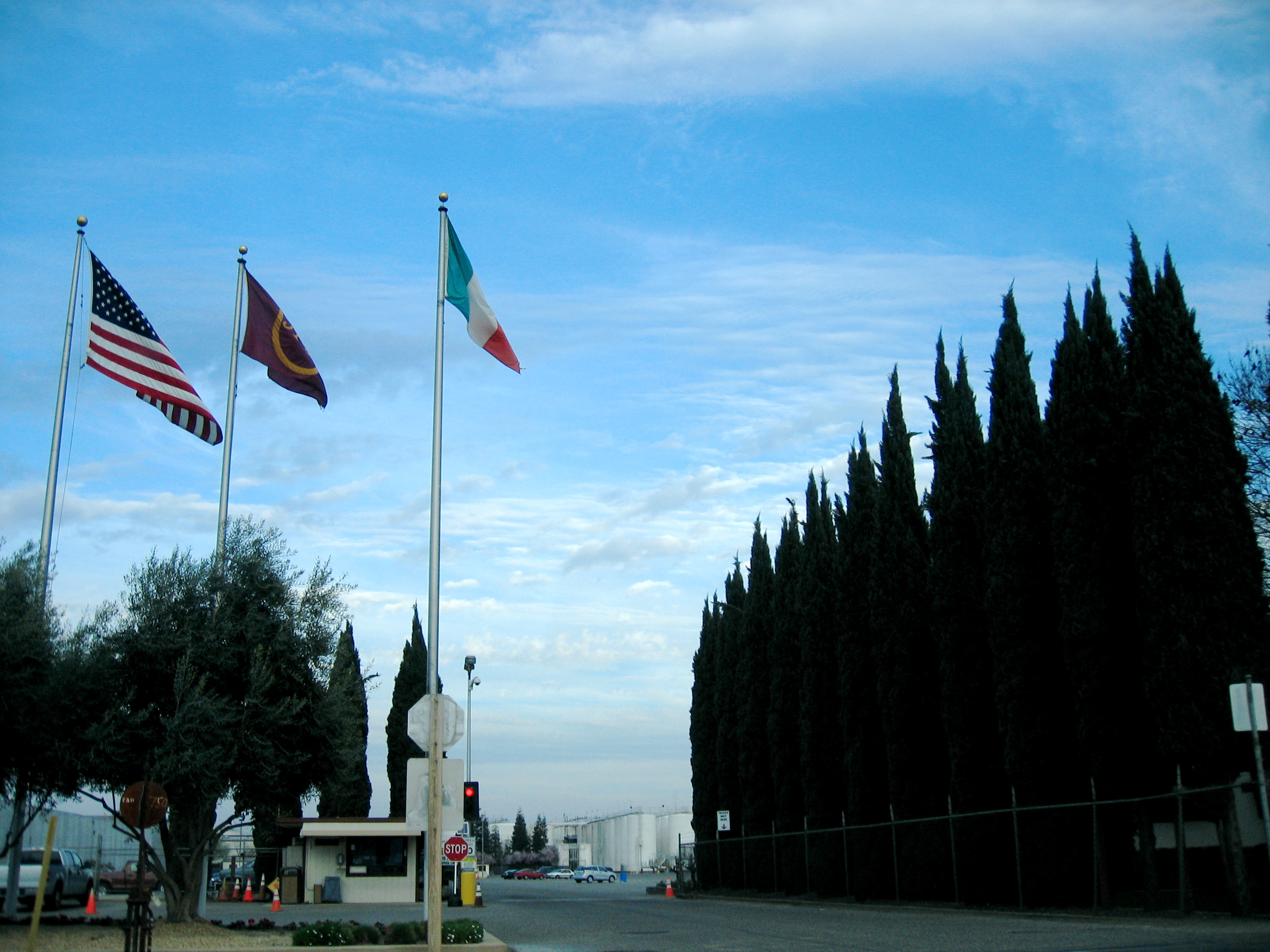
- Headquarters near Ceres, California.
- Industry: Beverages
- Founded: 1973
- Founder: Fred, Joseph and John Franzia
- Headquarters: near Ceres, California, U.S.
- Products: Wine
- Divisions: Wine & Spirits Division
- Website: broncowine.com

The Bronco Wine Company is a vintner that produces wine under many brands, such as Amusant Bubbly and Ballett Vineyards, and is based south of Ceres, California. It is the tenth largest producer of wine in the United States. Bronco Wine Co has an estimated 10,000 employees globally. There are two companies in the Bronco Wine Co. corporate family.

Fred and Joe Franzia attended Santa Clara University and picked their school symbol for the company. Bronco is a contraction of Brothers and Cousin, after the three founders.

== History ==
CEO Fred Franzia – nephew of wine legend Ernest Gallo – started Bronco Wine in 1973 with his brother Joseph and his cousin, John Franzia, after the Franzia winery business was purchased by Coca-Cola. The Franzia brand was later purchased by the Wine Group, a privately held bulk wine producer based in San Francisco (the source of the "bag-in-box" wines that bear the Franzia name but which have no connection to either the Franzia family or to Bronco).

In 1995, Bronco Wine Company purchased the brand name Charles Shaw from a bankrupt company for US$27,000 and used it for a line of very inexpensive wines, introduced in 2002 and priced at $1.99 per bottle. The wines became nicknamed "Two-Buck Chuck" and were sold exclusively through Trader Joe's stores.

In August 2013, Bronco Wine Company entered into a marketing campaign for its Allure Moscato wine products in partnership with Hip Hop artist Warren G and Brand Elite, LLC.

== Activities ==
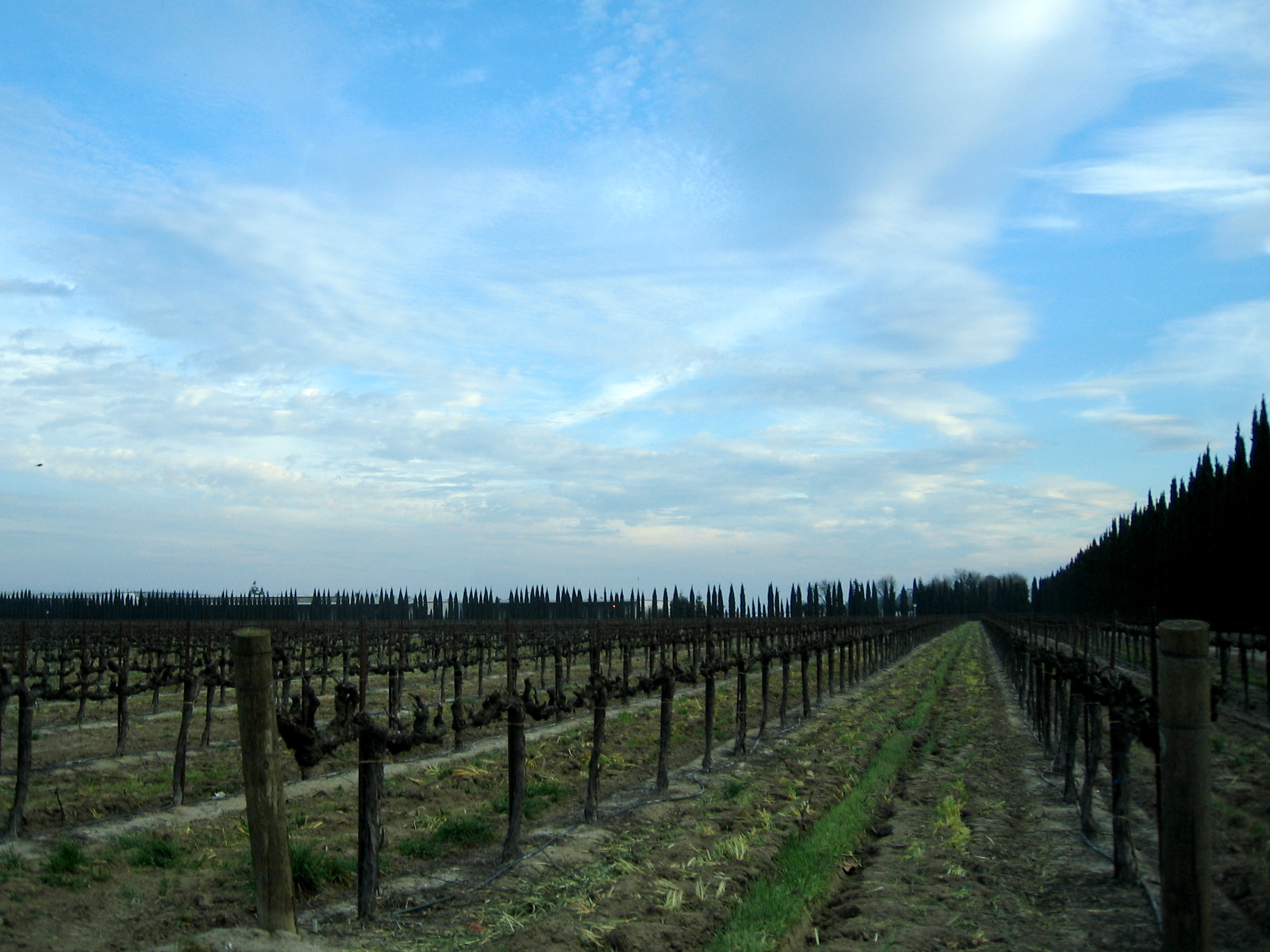
Grapevines growing on the grounds of the Bronco Wine Company in Ceres, California.

Bronco owns over 35,000 acres (140 km^{2}) of vineyards, most of which are located in California's Central Valley, with storage and production facilities in Ceres, Napa Valley, Sonoma Valley, Escalon, and Madera. Bronco can produce 61 million gallons (230 million L) of wine annually. Total annual sales were approximately 20 million cases.

Franzia's marketing methods contrast with his higher-priced competitors, although he is also credited with introducing new consumers to the wine market and ultimately to the premium brands. His business model is based on ownership of over 45,000 vineyard acres (180 km^{2}), the largest in the country, and the continuing surplus of grapes. Franzia said about claims that he sells wine for virtually the same price as a bottle of water: "They're overcharging for the water. Don't you get it?" and "I don't make wine to put in a closet. We sell wine to drink."

Bronco Wine is best known for its Charles Shaw wine brand of varietals, which for over ten years were commonly nicknamed "Two Buck Chuck" because of the retail price of $1.99 a bottle at Trader Joe's stores in California and some other states. "We choose to sell good quality wines at $2 a bottle because we think it's a fair price," Fred Franzia told ABC News. "We think the other people are charging too much." The Charles Shaw Chardonnay wine won the double gold at the 2007 California State Fair Commercial Wine Competition.

=== Brands ===
The Bronco Wine Company maintains over 250 brands of wine, including:

- Albertoni Vineyards
- Alexander and Fitch
- Almond Creek
- Bad Dog Ranch
- Bears' Lair
- Black Mountain
- Blue Fin
- CC Vineyards
- Cedar Brook
- Charles Shaw, AKA "Two Buck Chuck"
- Chateau California
- Coastal Ridge
- Coastal Vines
- Congress Springs
- Crane Lake
- Domaine Laurier
- Domaine Napa
- Dona Sol
- Douglass Hill
- Down Under
- Estrella
- Fat Cat
- Forest Glen
- Forest Hill
- ForestVille
- Foxbrook
- Grand Cru
- Green Fin
- Green Truck
- Grove Ridge
- Hacienda
- Harlow Ridge
- JW Morris
- JFJ Winery
- Laurier
- Mongo Wine
- Montpellier
- Napa Creek
- Napa Crossing
- Napa Landing
- Napa Ridge
- Napa River
- Oak Vineyards
- Pacific Oasis
- Pink Truck
- Quail Creek
- Quail Ridge
- Raymond Hill
- Red Truck
- Redwood
- Rock Brook
- Rutherford Vintners
- Salmon Creek
- Santa Barbara Crossing
- Santa Barbara Landing
- Sea Ridge
- Silver Ridge
- The California Winery
- Thousand Oaks
- Three Knights Vineyards
- Trellis
- White Truck

== Concerns and incidents ==
In 1993, Franzia and Bronco Wine Company were indicted on federal charges of conspiracy to defraud by misrepresenting cheaper grapes as premium Zinfandel and Cabernet Sauvignon. Bronco pleaded no contest and paid a $2.5 million fine. Franzia also pleaded guilty to his involvement, paid a $500,000 fine, stepped down as Bronco's president and member of the company's board of directors, and agreed to refrain from involvement with grape purchasing for five years in lieu of prison time.

Franzia has also been at odds with California's premium winemakers for several years over his inclusion of Napa and other related appellation terms on the labels of his wines. Franzia sued the state of California over the implementation of a 2000 law that tightened federal labeling laws. His lawsuit was unsuccessful initially and up through the appeals process as well; he eventually sought certiorari in the United States Supreme Court, but the Court declined to take the case.
