= Ceres River Bluff Regional Park =

Park in California, United States

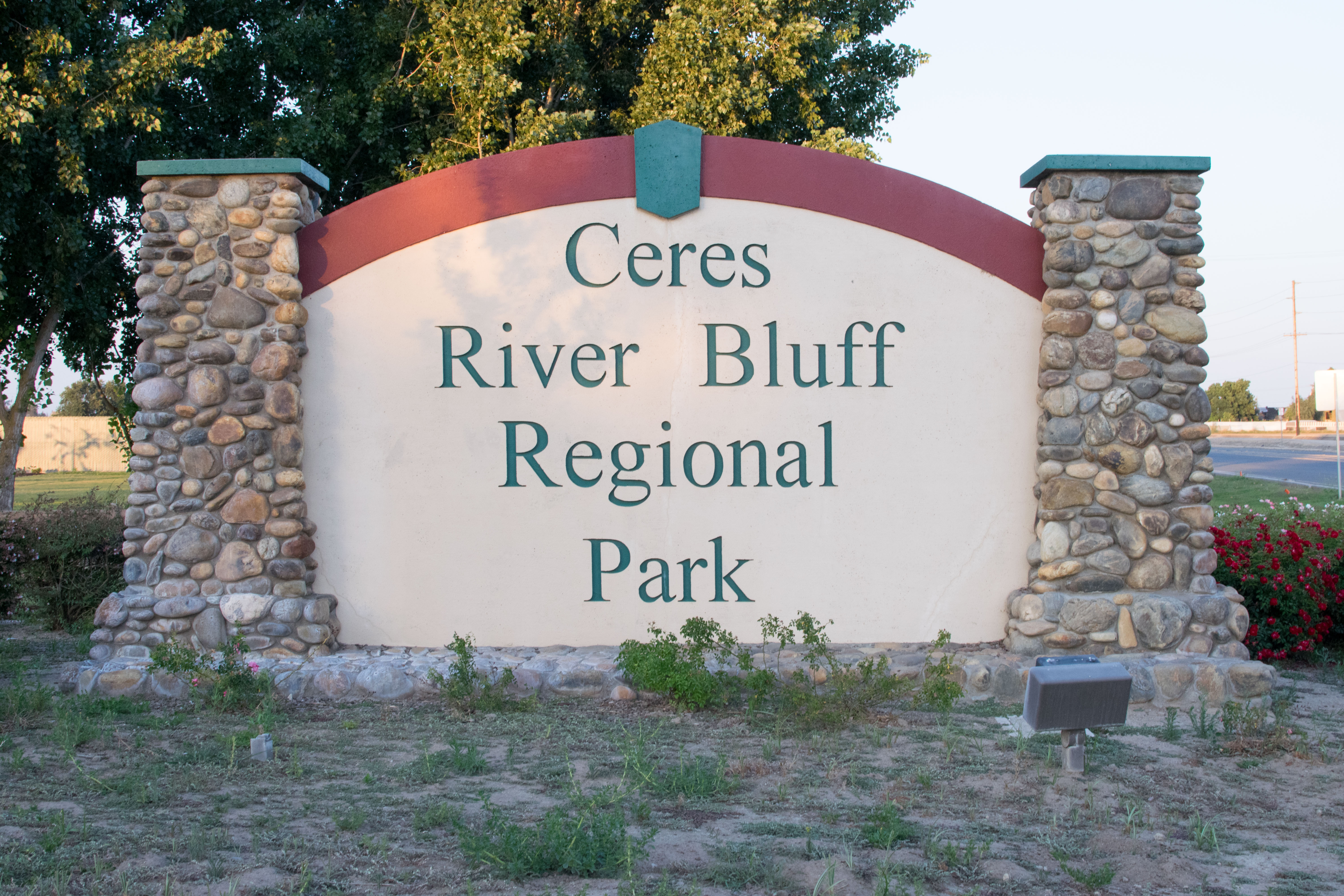
- Entrance sign
- Interactive map of Ceres River Bluff Regional Park
- Type: Regional park
- Location: Ceres, California, United States
- Coordinates: 37°36′N 120°55′W
- Area: 76 acres (0.31 km^{2})
- Created: 2000
- Operator: City of Ceres
- Status: Open all year

Ceres River Bluff Regional Park is a regional park in Ceres, California in the United States. It covers 76 acres (31 ha) along the Tuolumne River adjacent to Modesto. It is part of the City of Ceres park system.

== Geography ==
The Ceres River Bluff Regional Park consists of two geographically different sections. The upper terrace that runs parallel to Hatch Ave consists of soccer fields, walking paths, children's playgrounds, and parking areas. The lower terrace lies near the Tuolumne River, is currently undergoing restoration to a natural riparian habitat as it had previously been used as a walnut orchard.

== The Upper Terrace ==
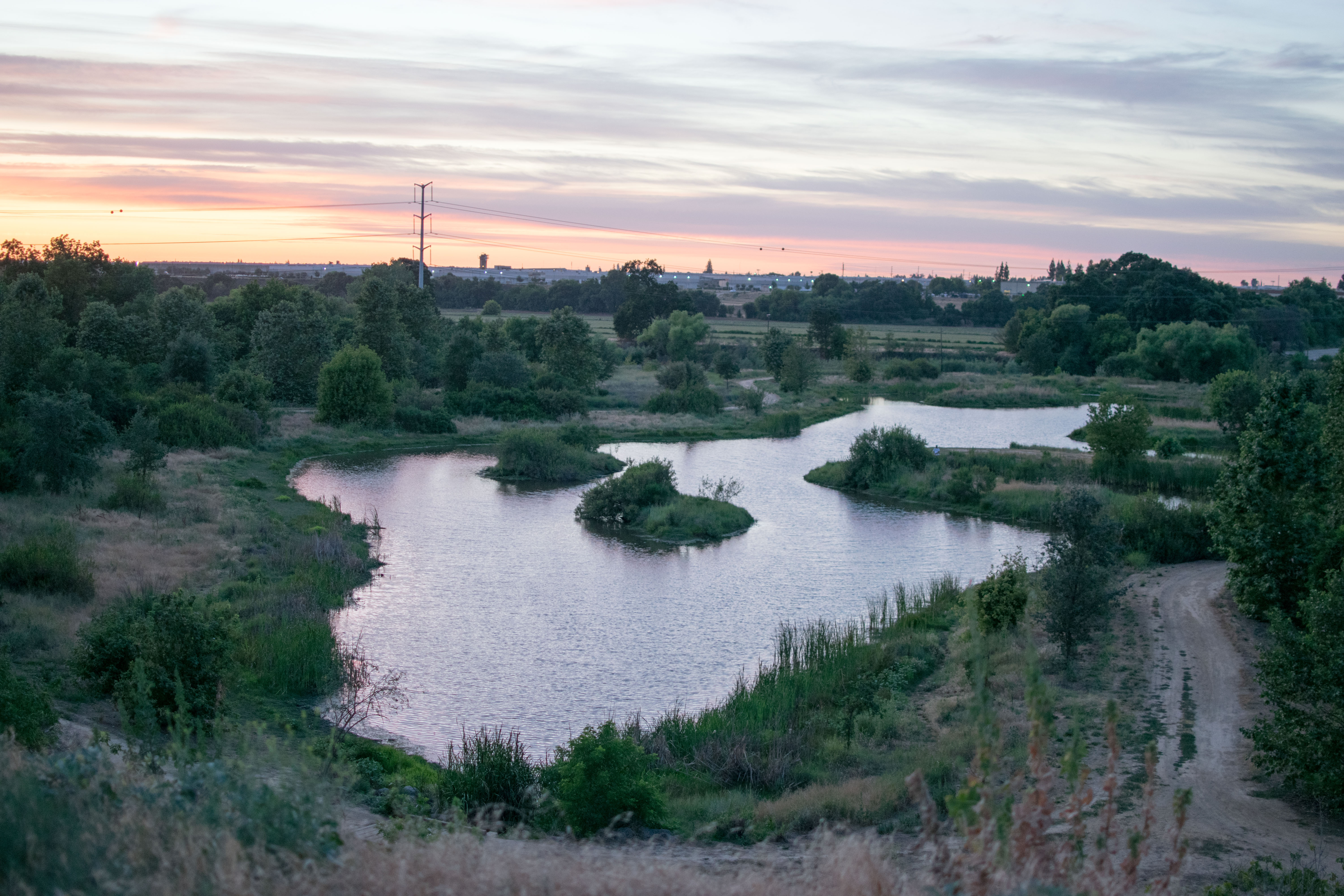
A view of the pond on the Lower Terrance

The Upper Terrace,38 acres (15 ha), contains several sports facilities consisting of six soccer fields, two softball fields, one basketball court, and two volleyball courts. The 2015 remodel also improved other amenities including a group picnic area, a children’s play area, a snack bar area, and restrooms.

== The Lower Terrace ==
The Lower Terrance is currently undergoing restoration to a natural riverside riparian zone. It consists of bike/hiking trails, river access, and picnic tables. The lower section of the park runs along the Tuolumne River. There is a small inland pond that is a popular fishing spot. Prior to its purchase, the lower park housed a walnut orchard. Several rows of Walnut trees are still located on the lower terrace.

== Sports complex ==
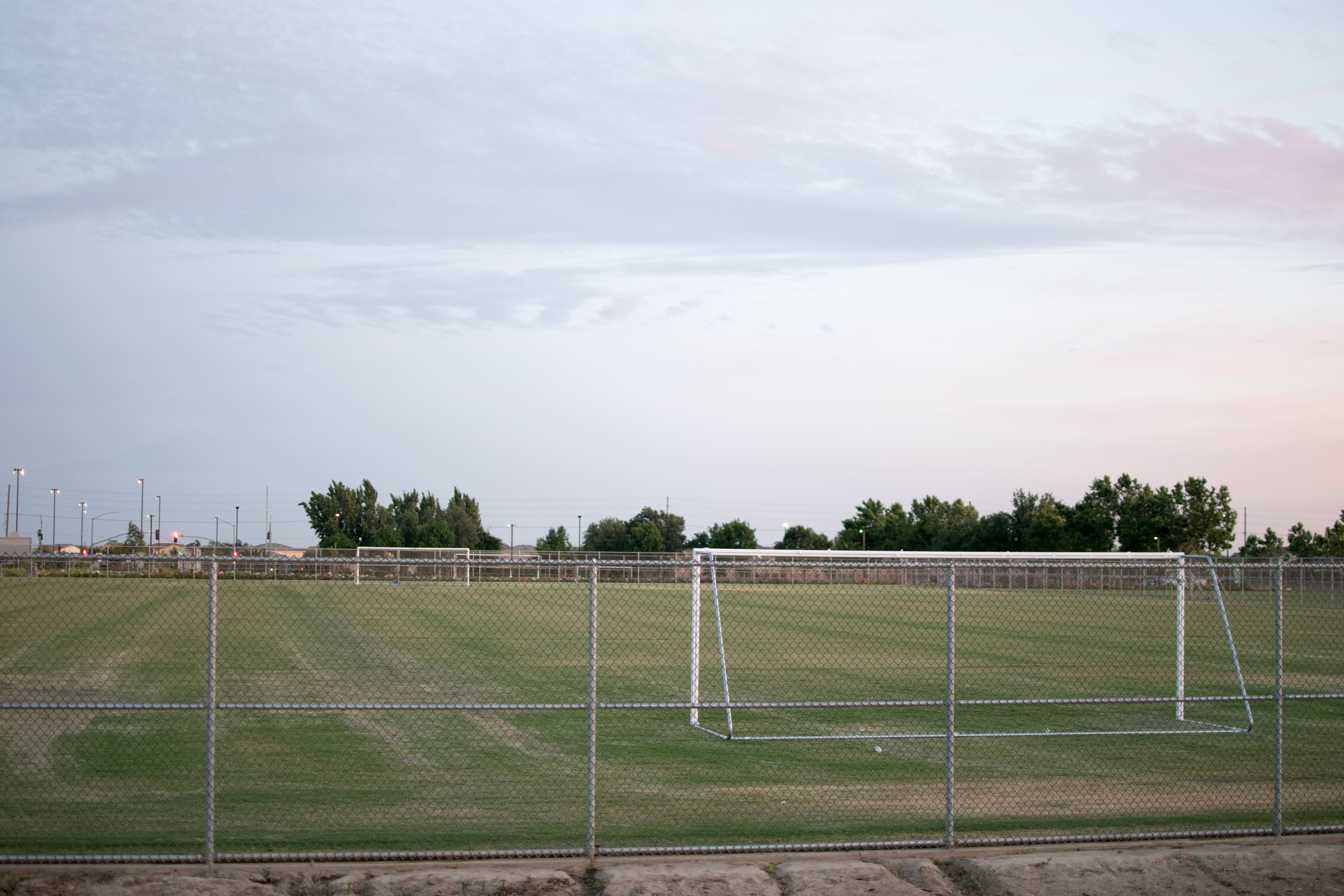
One of several soccer fields on the upper Terrance

Several soccer associations utilize the park for league play. Originally the park was considered too small to host large tournaments; however, the 2015 park expansion served to increase the number of available fields and to allow Ceres to compete with neighboring towns for tournament hosting.
