= Charles Shaw wine =

Brand of bargain-priced wine

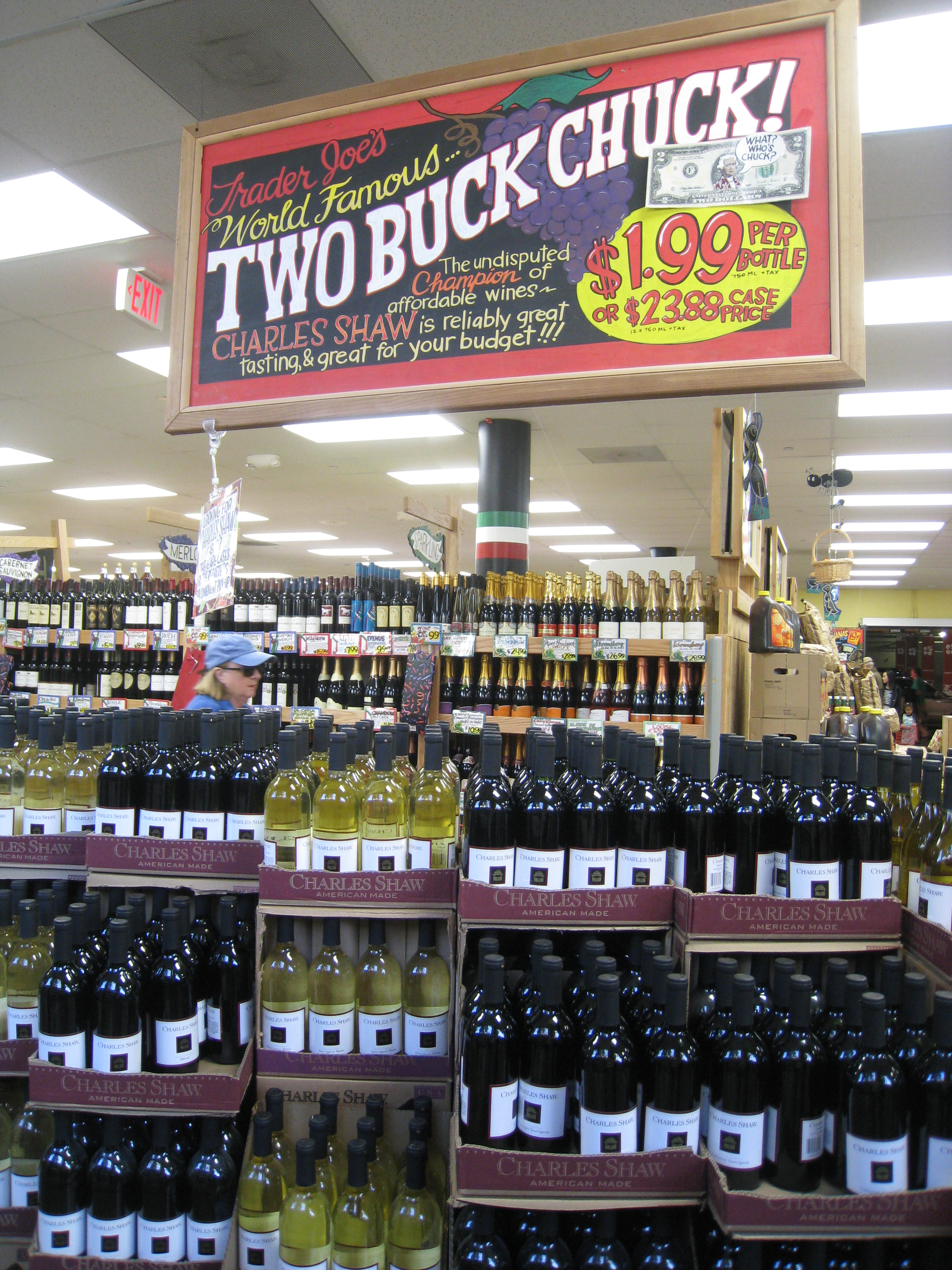
Charles Shaw wine displayed in 2010 in a Trader Joe's grocery market.

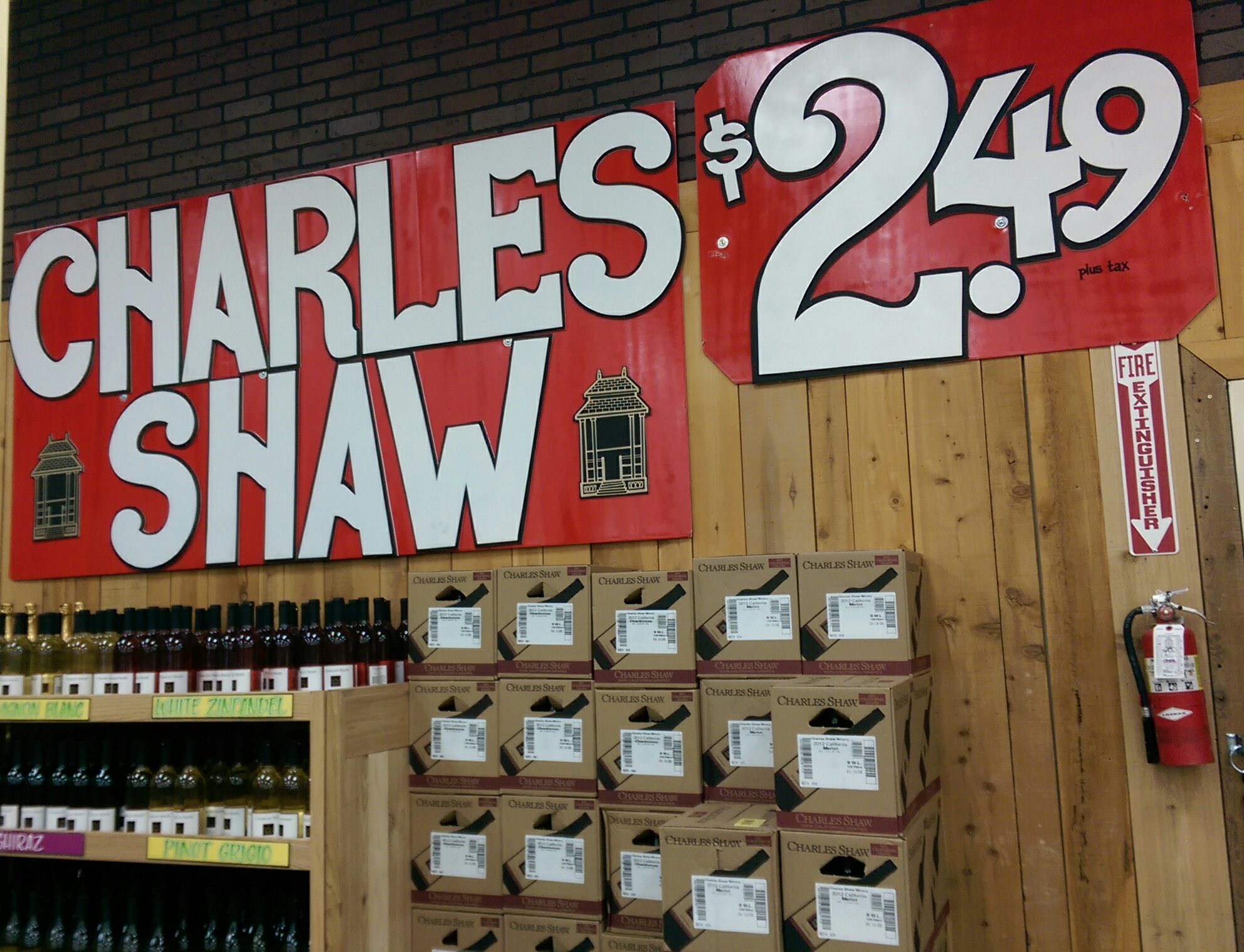
Charles Shaw display in California after the 2013 price increase to US$2.49

Charles Shaw is an American brand of bargain-priced wine. Largely made from California grapes, Charles Shaw wines include Cabernet Sauvignon, White Zinfandel, Merlot, Chardonnay, Sauvignon Blanc, Shiraz, Valdiguié in the style of Beaujolais nouveau, and limited quantities of Pinot Grigio.

== Overview ==
Charles Shaw wines were introduced at Trader Joe's grocery stores in California in 2002 at a price of US$1.99 per bottle, earning the wines the nickname "Two Buck Chuck", and eventually sold 800 million bottles between 2002 and 2013. In 2009, an international version of Chardonnay from Australia was introduced in a limited number of stores. Prices in states other than California have increased to US$3.79 per bottle. The price was later raised. As of August 29, 2021, a bottle of Charles Shaw retailed for US$2.99 in California. The cost of the wine is about 30 to 40 percent of the price, with the bottle, cork and distribution the larger part. The cost of shipping Two-Buck Chuck anywhere out of California becomes too high to justify the US$1.99 price.

In April 2018, the winery introduced a line of organic wines, at US$1 higher than their standard line.

== History ==
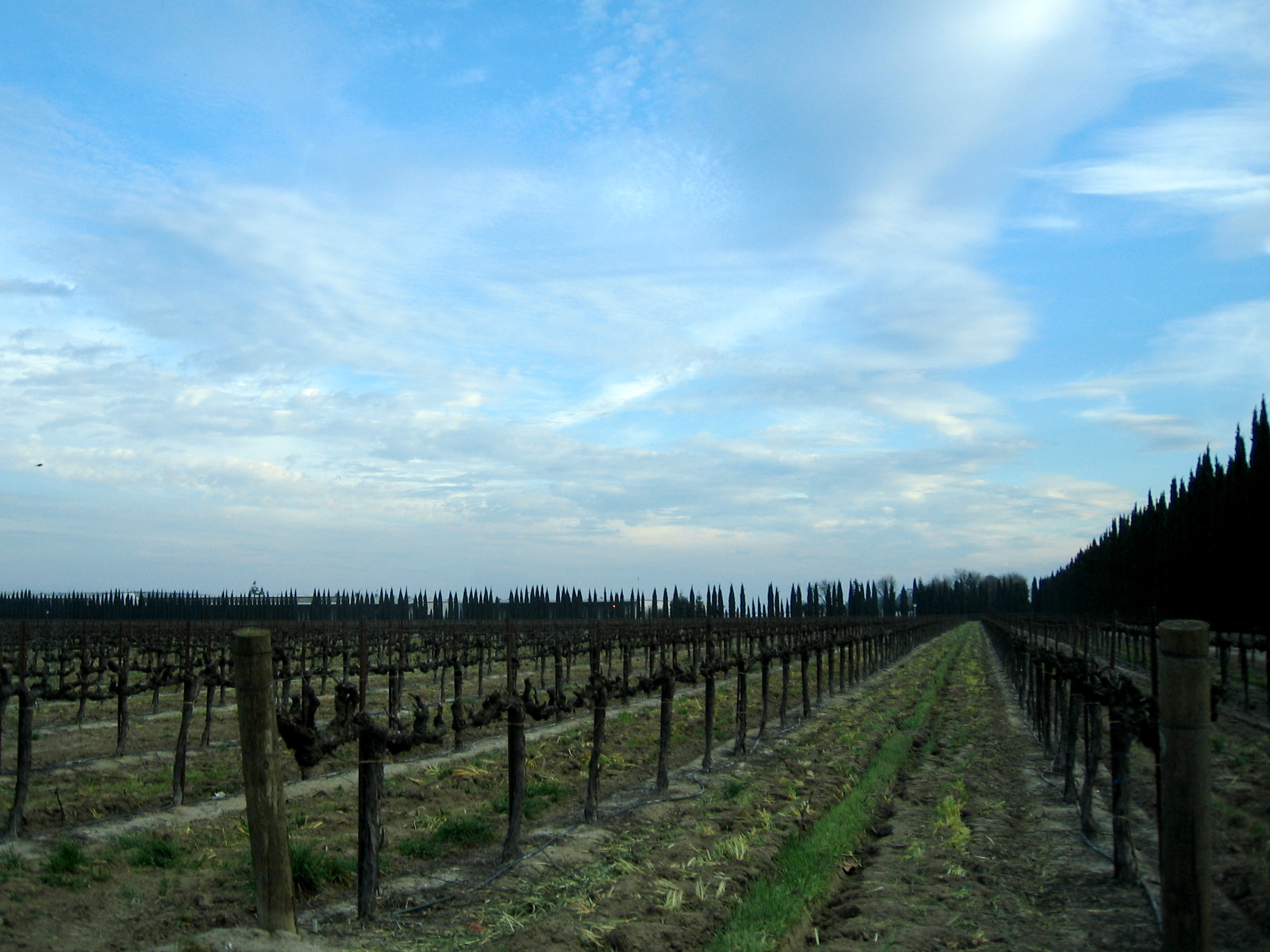
Grapevines growing on the grounds of the Bronco Wine Company in Ceres, California, where Charles Shaw wine is produced.

The brand began as an eponymous winery owned by Charles F. Shaw, producing Beaujolais-style wines in the Napa Valley AVA. During bankruptcy proceedings in 1995, its trademark was acquired for US$27,000 by Bronco Wine Company, co-owned by Fred Franzia, formerly of Franzia Brothers wines.

The company produces the Charles Shaw label at their Ceres, Escalon and Napa, California wineries. A 2006 Los Angeles Times story said the company could fill 60,000 bottles of the Charles Shaw brand in two to three days.

== Awards ==
At the 28th Annual International Eastern Wine Competition, Shaw's 2002 Shiraz received the double gold medal, beating approximately 2,300 other wines in the competition.

Shaw's 2005 California Chardonnay was judged Best Chardonnay from California at the Commercial Wine Competition of the 2007 California Exposition and State Fair. The chardonnay received 98 points, a double gold, with accolades of "Best of California" and "Best of Class".
