= Fred Franzia =

American winemaker (1943–2022)

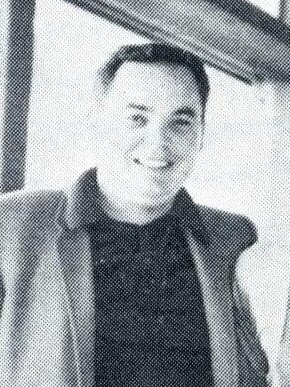
Franzia in 1971

Fred Thomas Franzia (May 24, 1943 – September 13, 2022) was an American winemaker. He was a co-founder and CEO of the Bronco Wine Company, the producer of the Charles Shaw brand, better known as "Two-Buck Chuck".

== Early life ==
Fred Franzia was born and raised in Modesto, California, into a family with a long tradition of winemaking. His Italian immigrant grandparents, Giuseppe and Teresa Franzia, started a winery in 1910. Fred was a nephew of wine legend Ernest Gallo, who married Fred's aunt Amelia Franzia. In 1949 Giuseppe and Teresa's children, including Fred's father Joseph, took over the family business, naming it Franzia Brothers Winery.

== Career ==
Fred Franzia graduated from Santa Clara University in 1965, then went to work in the family winery. When the winery was sold to Coca-Cola in 1973, Fred joined with his brother Joseph and his cousin John Franzia to start a new venture called Bronco Wine Company. Fred became the CEO. The company mostly repackaged wine that it purchased from other vintners. In 1995 Bronco Wine purchased the brand name Charles Shaw from a bankrupt company and used it for a line of very inexpensive wines, introduced in 2002 and priced at $1.99 per bottle. The wines became nicknamed "Two-Buck Chuck" and were sold exclusively through Trader Joe's stores. They were enormously popular, selling more than a billion bottles by 2018.

Franzia was a strong believer that wine should "be enjoyed and consumed on every American table". To that end he wanted wine to be affordable, saying that a person should not have to pay more than $10 for a bottle. "Two-Buck Chuck" was often the first wine purchased by newcomers to the wine scene, and is credited with demystifying wine for American consumers – what one source called "the unlikely democratization of a historically snobby industry." The New York Times said that Franzia "turned the wine industry on its head."

== Personal life ==
Franzia was married twice and divorced twice. He had five children from his first marriage. He died at the age of 79 at his home in Denair, California, near Modesto.
