= Ceres Unified School District =

School district in California, United States

Address
- 2503 Lawrence Street Ceres, California, 95307; United States

District information
- Type: Public
- Grades: K–12
- NCES District ID: 0608130

Students and staff
- Students: 14,251
- Teachers: 608.83 (FTE)
- Staff: 909.09
- Student–teacher ratio: 23.41

Other information
- Website: www.ceres.k12.ca.us

Ceres Unified School District is a school district based in Stanislaus County, California, United States of America. It is headquartered in Ceres, California. The district consists of 21 elementary, junior high, and high schools.
