= The Wine Group =

American alcoholic beverage company

- Type: Private
- Industry: Winemaking
- Founded: 1981
- Headquarters: Livermore, California, US
- Key people: John Sutton (CEO)
- Products: Wine
- Website: www.thewinegroup.com

The Wine Group is an American alcoholic beverage company founded in 1981, and based in Livermore, California.

== Products ==
It produces wine brands including Franzia, Cupcake Vineyards, Benziger Family Winery, Chloe Wine Collection, 7 Deadly Wines, Imagery Estate Winery, and Almaden Vineyards. As of 2008, the company was the world's third-largest wine producer. As of 2018, the company became the second-largest U.S. wine company, producing 53 million cases annually

== List of notable brands ==
- Franzia
- Cupcake Vineyards
- Chloe Wine Collection
- 7 Deadly Wines
- Benziger Family Winery
- Imagery Estate Winery
- Tribute Wines
- Mogen David (makers of MD 20/20)
- Almaden Vineyards
- Hope Tree

== Unrelated Australian Company of the Same Name ==
The Wine Group is not affiliated with the Australian entity The Wine Group Pty Ltd. which was found to have breached multiple spam and telemarketing laws in Australia in 2021

== See also ==
- List of California companies
- List of U.S. beverage companies
