= Ceres, California =

City in California, United States

- City
- City of Ceres
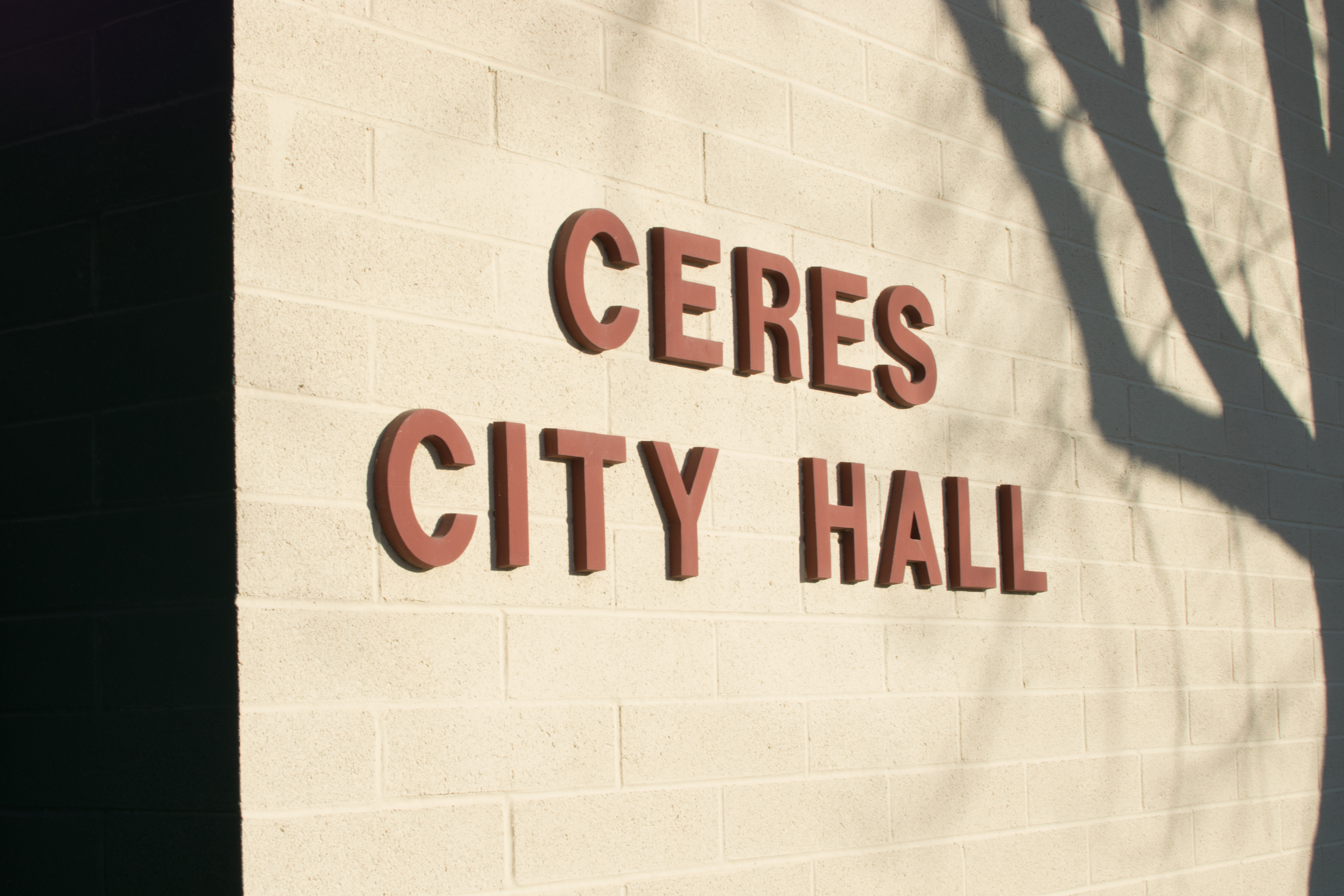
- Ceres City Hall

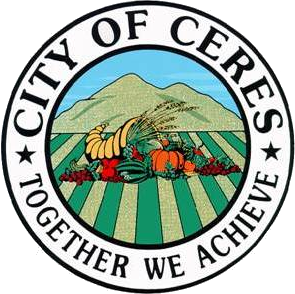
- Seal
- Motto: "Together We Achieve"
- Interactive map of Ceres, California
- Location in the United States Ceres, California (the United States)
- Coordinates: 37°36′5″N 120°57′26″W
- Country: United States of America
- State: California
- County: Stanislaus
- Incorporated: February 26, 1918
- Named for: Ceres

Government
  - Mayor: Javier Lopez

Area
  - Total: 9.51 sq mi (24.62 km^{2})
  - Land: 9.50 sq mi (24.60 km^{2})
  - Water: 0.0039 sq mi (0.01 km^{2}) 0.06%
- Elevation: 92 ft (28 m)

Population (2020)
  - Total: 49,302
  - Density: 5,190/sq mi (2,004/km^{2})
- Time zone: UTC-8 (Pacific)
  - Summer (DST): UTC-7 (PDT)
- ZIP code: 95307
- Area code: 209
- FIPS code: 06-12524
- GNIS feature IDs: 1655882, 2409430
- Website: www.ceres.gov

Ceres is a city in Stanislaus County, California, United States. Its population was 49,302 at the 2020 U.S. census, up from 45,417 at the 2010 U.S. census. It is part of the Modesto metropolitan statistical area.

Ceres is located in the San Joaquin Valley along State Route 99, south of Modesto and north of Turlock in Stanislaus County. Ceres is named after the Roman goddess of agriculture.

The newspaper in Ceres is called the Ceres Courier, which has been in publication since 1910. The offices of the Ceres Courier were relocated from an address in downtown Ceres in 2012. It has since combined day-to-day operations with its sister paper, the Turlock Journal, in Turlock. Jeff Benziger was appointed editor in 1987. The city also has a Spanish-language paper.

Ceres hosts annual events at different times of the year. Spring brings the Ceres Street Faire on the first weekend in May. Skies the Limit, Ceres Hot Air Balloon Festival, Concert in the Park is a regular summer event. Halloween Fun Festival marks the fall, followed by the colorful, and much-attended, Christmas Tree Lane opening ceremony.

== History ==
The first non-native families who inhabited Ceres were those of John Service, Cassius Warner, and Daniel Whitmore in 1867. Daniel C. Whitmore is considered the first founding patriarch of Ceres. He built his home in 1870, the Daniel Whitmore House at 2928 5th Street. That home still stands, fully restored by the city and the Ceres Historical Society. The Clinton Whitmore Mansion, built in 1903 is also owned by the City of Ceres.

In the early 1890s, outlaws Chris Evans and John Sontag robbed several Southern Pacific Railroad trains at Ceres and several other area locations. In the late 1930s, a labor camp was developed within the city of Ceres as part of the Federal Migratory Labor Camp Program.

The history of Ceres is recounted in Arcadia Publishing Company's Images of America series entitled, Ceres, by Jeff Benziger. It was released on August 23, 2010.

The Ceres Historical Museum highlights items from the town's history, focusing on items which were used in the daily life in Ceres.

== Geography ==
According to the U.S. Census Bureau, Ceres has a total area of 9.5 sq mi(24.6 km^{2}), of which 99.9% is land and 0.1% is water. The formation of alluvial fans in the San Joaquin Valley has led to a rather flat regional geography. No active earthquake fault traces in the project vicinity are known. Hydrological feature mapping of the Ceres area has been conducted by the U. S. Geological Survey.

== Demographics ==
Historical population
Census	Pop.	Note	%±
1920	637		—
1930	981		54.0%
1940	1,332		35.8%
1950	2,351		76.5%
1960	4,406		87.4%
1970	6,029		36.8%
1980	13,281		120.3%
1990	26,314		98.1%
2000	34,609		31.5%
2010	45,417		31.2%
2020	49,302		8.6%
U.S. Decennial Census; 1860–1870 1880-1890; 1900 1910 1920; 1930 1940 1950; 1960 1970 1980; 1990 2000 2010

=== 2020 census ===
As of the 2020 census, Ceres had a population of 49,302. The population density was 5,663.2 inhabitants per square mile (2,186.6/km^{2}). The median age was 32.4 years. 28.9% of residents were under the age of 18 and 10.6% of residents were 65 years of age or older. For every 100 females there were 100.1 males, and for every 100 females age 18 and over there were 97.5 males age 18 and over.

99.6% of residents lived in urban areas, while 0.4% lived in rural areas.

There were 13,542 households in Ceres, of which 50.8% had children under the age of 18 living in them. Of all households, 54.6% were married-couple households, 15.0% were households with a male householder and no spouse or partner present, and 23.0% were households with a female householder and no spouse or partner present. About 12.3% of all households were made up of individuals and 5.6% had someone living alone who was 65 years of age or older.

There were 13,828 housing units, of which 2.1% were vacant. The homeownership rate was 63.3%. The homeowner vacancy rate was 0.4% and the rental vacancy rate was 2.9%.

Racial composition as of the 2020 census
Race	Number	Percent
White	16,248	33.0%
Black or African American	1,020	2.1%
American Indian and Alaska Native	1,017	2.1%
Asian	4,226	8.6%
Native Hawaiian and Other Pacific Islander	382	0.8%
Some other race	17,536	35.6%
Two or more races	8,873	18.0%
Hispanic or Latino (of any race)	31,624	64.1%

=== 2010 census ===
The 2010 U.S. census reported that Ceres had a population of 45,417. The population density was 5,663.2 inhabitants per square mile (2,186.6/km^{2}). The ethnic makeup of Ceres was 26,217 (57.7%) White, 1,185 (2.6%) African American, 609 (1.3%) Native American, 3,093 (6.8%) Asian, 346 (0.8%) Pacific Islander, 11,463 (25.2%) from other races, and 2,504 (5.5%) from two or more races. Hispanics or Latinos of any race were 25,436 persons (56.0%).

The census reported that 45,064 people (99.2% of the population) lived in households, 293 (0.6%) lived in non-institutionalized group quarters, and 60 (0.1%) were institutionalized.

Of the 12,692 households, 6,876 (54.2%) had children under 18 living in them, 7,311 (57.6%) were opposite-sex married couples living together, 2,211 (17.4%) had a female householder with no husband present, and 1,053 (8.3%) had a male householder with no wife present. The city had 976 (7.7%) unmarried opposite-sex partnerships, and 76 (0.6%) same-sex married couples or partnerships; 1,586 households (12.5%) were one person and 628 (4.9%) had someone living alone who was 65 or older. The average household size was 3.55. There were 10,575 families (83.3% of households); the average family size was 3.84.

The age distribution was 14,623 people (32.2%) under 18, 5,108 people (11.2%) aged 18 to 24, 12,506 people (27.5%) aged 25 to 44, 9,667 people (21.3%) aged 45 to 64, and 3,513 people (7.7%) who were 65 or older. The median age was 29.4 years. For every 100 females, there were 97.9 males. For every 100 females age 18 and over, there were 93.9 males.

The 13,673 housing units averaged of 1,704.9/sq mi, and of the occupied units, 8,010 (63.1%) were owner-occupied and 4,682 (36.9%) were rented. The homeowner vacancy rate was 2.5%; the rental vacancy rate was 8.2%; 27,776 people (61.2% of the population) lived in owner-occupied housing units and 17,288 people (38.1%) lived in rental housing units.

=== 2000 census ===
As of the 2000 U.S. census, 34,609 people, 10,435 households, and 8,535 families were in the city. The population density was 4,988.6 people/mi^{2} (1,926.1 people/km^{2}). The 10,773 housing units at an average density of 1,552.8 units per square mile (599.5 units/km^{2}). The ethnic makeup of the city was 64.5% White, 2.8% African American, 1.4% Native American, 5.0% Asian, 0.4% Pacific Islander, 20.4% from other races, and 5.5% from two or more races. Hispanics or Latinos of any race were 37.9% of the population.

Of the 10,435 households, 48.6% had children under 18 living with them, 59.8% were married couples living together, 15.7% had a female householder with no husband present, and 18.2% were not families. About 14.1% of households were one person, and 6.0% were one person aged 65 or older. The average household size was 3.31, and the average family size was 3.62.

The age distribution was 34.4% under 18, 10.1% from 18 to 24, 30.0% from 25 to 44, 17.5% from 45 to 64, and 8.1% 65 or older. The median age was 29 years. For every 100 females, there were 97.0 males. For every 100 females age 18 and over, there were 92.8 males.

The median income for a household was $40,736 and for a family was $43,587. Males had a median income of $35,109 versus $24,317 for females. The per capita income for the city was $14,420. About 10.1% of families and 12.9% of the population were below the poverty line, including 14.6% of those under age 18 and 10.2% of those age 65 or over.

== Government ==
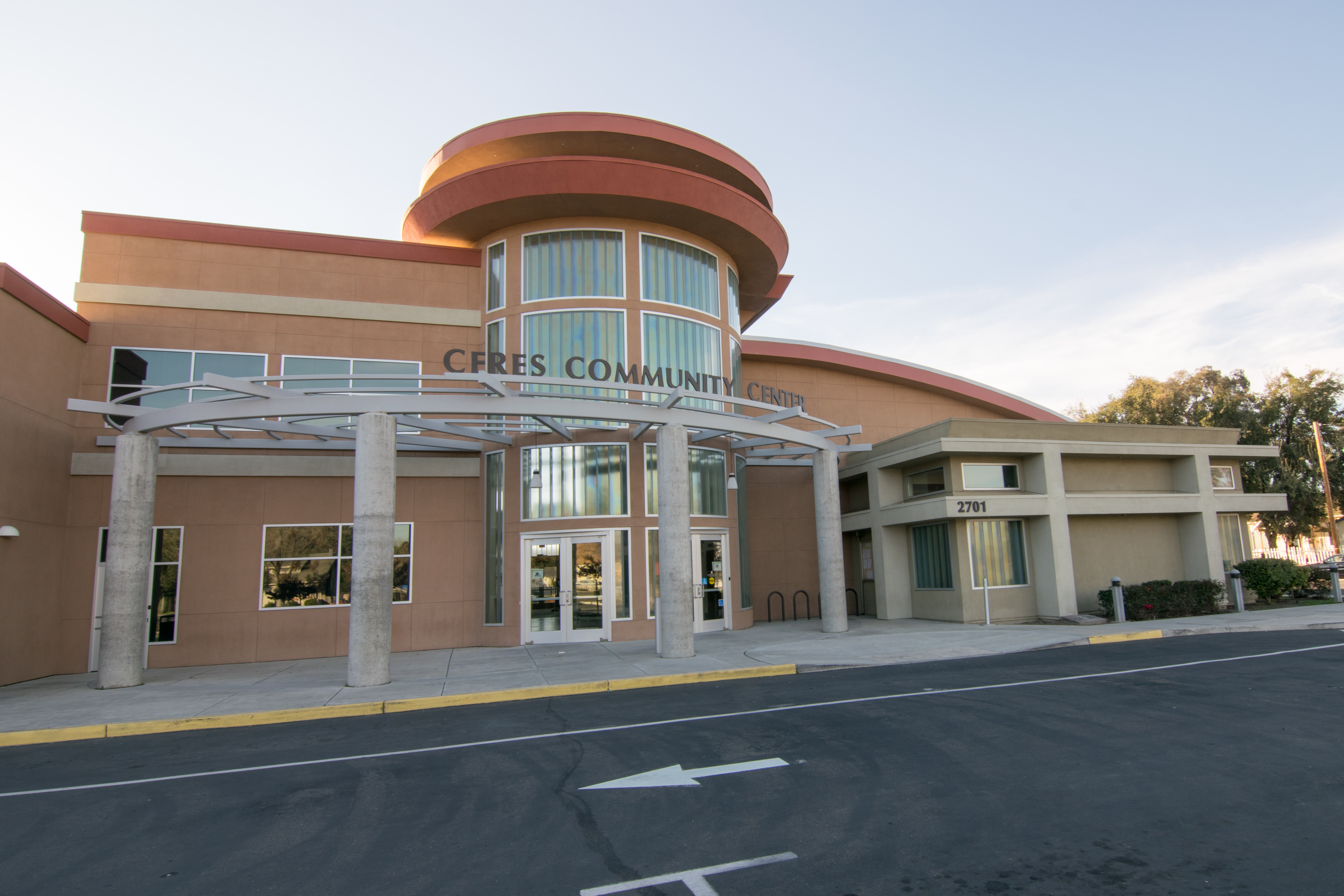
Ceres Community Center

In the California State Legislature, Ceres is in the 4th senatorial district, represented by Republican Marie Alvarado-Gil, and in the 22nd Assembly district, represented by Republican Juan Alanis.

In the United States House of Representatives, Ceres is in California's 13th congressional district, represented by Democrat Adam Gray as of January 2025.

The City of Ceres has an elected City Council, including the positions of mayor and four council members. As of January 2025, Javier Lopez is the mayor. A part-time City Treasurer is also an elected position. The City Council hires a professional City Manager as the Chief Administrative Officer and appoints a City Attorney.

== Economy ==
The Bronco Wine Company, makers of Charles Shaw wine, also known as "Two-Buck Chuck", is headquartered south of Ceres.

== Parks and recreation ==
The City of Ceres maintains 11 parks for public use. Ceres's largest park is the Ceres River Bluff Regional Park.

== Transportation ==
Altamont Corridor Express commuter rail train service is expected to be extended to a new station in Ceres by 2026.

== Notable people ==
- Cliff Barrows - the ministry partner and announcer at the Billy Graham evangelistic crusades
- Gary Condit - former Democratic U.S. Congressman from 1989 to 2002
- Gary Duncan - guitarist for Quicksilver Messenger Service
- Wayne Hardin - College Football Hall of Famer, former football and basketball coach at Ceres High School
- Kenny Pierce - former bass guitar player for Buck Owens' Buckaroos from 1960 to 1962
- Cade Cowell - professional soccer player for Chivas Guadalajara
- Sis Bates - softball player for the Washington Huskies
- John Rade - former linebacker for the Atlanta Falcons
