= Matt Pence =

American record producer and drummer

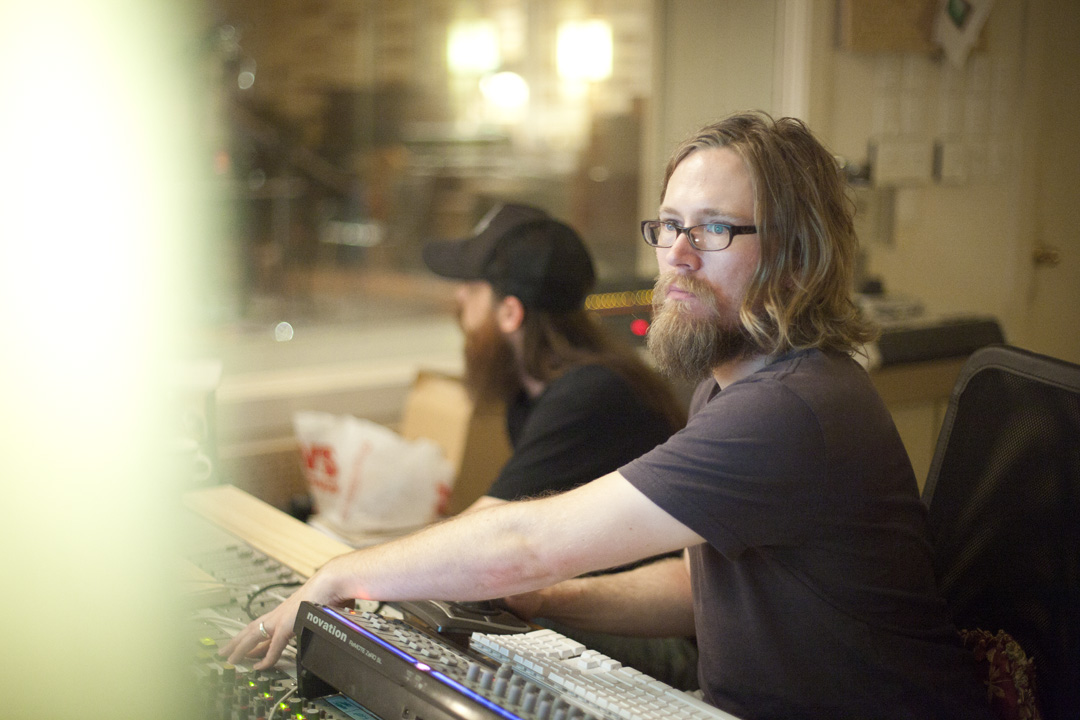
- Matt Pence at Echo Lab working on record by True Widow

Background information
- Born: Matthew Louis Pence; April 13, 1972 (age 54); St. Louis, Missouri U.S.
- Genres: Americana; country; rock and roll
- Occupations: Record producer; Drummer; recording engineer; mixer
- Years active: 1996–present
- Labels: Idol; Misra; Undertow Music
- Website: mattpence.com

Matthew Louis Pence (born April 13, 1972) is an American recording engineer, producer, and drummer. He owns and manages The Echo Lab studio in Denton, Texas.

== Early life and education ==
Pence is from St. Louis, Missouri.

In 1990, Pence moved to Denton, Texas to study jazz at University of North Texas College of Music.

== Career ==
In 1996, Pence did his first recording for a drummer friend on their record.

In 1999, musician and mastering engineer Dave Willingham created The Echo Lab studio outside the woods in Denton, Texas. In 2006, Pence and musician / engineer Matthew Barnhart became co-owners with Willingham of his Echo Lab studio. Pence is currently the full owner of The Echo Lab.

International bands from Australia, Britain, and other places, like Sweard from Spain and Horse Company from Holland, have all recorded at The Echo Lab.

From 1997 until 2014, Pence played drums in the alternative country band Centro-matic. He was also the drummer in the Centro-matic-fueled band, South San Gabriel.

Pence has also had a long-time collaboration with musician Sarah Jaffe, co-producing her 2011 record, The Way Sound Leaves a Room and her 2017 record, Bad Baby, as well as touring with Jaffe as her drummer.

In 2004, Pence mixed American Music Club's album called Love Songs For Patriots. He also recorded the song "Song Of The Rats Leaving The Sinking Ship".

Pence produced 2020 John Moreland album, LP5, which featured contributions from Centro-matic's Will Johnson, as well as Bonnie Whitmore and Moreland's long-time bandmate, John Calvin Abney.

In addition to his work as a drummer, producer, and engineer, Pence is a photographer.

== General discography ==
=== Drummer ===
- Adam's Farm
- Camerado
- Centro-matic
- Dan C
- Dooms U.K.
- Green Hour Residency
- Jason Isbell
- Jay Farrar
- Jonathan Tyler
- Justin Townes Earle
- Marie/Lepanto
- Nikki Lane
- Paul Cauthen
- Sarah Jaffe
- South San Gabriel

=== Production ===
- Breastfist
- Fishboy
- Here We Go Magic
- Isaac Hoskins
- Jonathan Tyler
- Rossif Sutherland
- Telegraph Canyon
- The Breeders
- True Widow
- Yuck

== Selected discography ==
- 2001: Midlake, Milkmaid Grand Army EP (self-released) – recorded by, mixed by
- 2001: Jay Farrar, Sebastopol (Artemis Records) – drums, percussion
- 2002: Lewis, Even So (Deep Elm Records) – engineer
- 2004: Aqueduct, Pistols at Dawn EP (Barsuk Records) – producer, drums
- 2004: American Music Club, Love Songs For Patriots (Merge Records/Devil in the Woods/Cooking Vinyl) – mixer
- 2004: Brave Combo, Let's Kiss: 25th Anniversary Album (Dentone Records) – engineer
- 2006: The Drams, Jubilee Dive (New West Records) – producer, photography
- 2006: Glossary, For What I Don’t Become (Undertow Music) – producer
- 2007: Robert Gomez, Brand New Towns (Bella Union) – producer
- 2009: Midlake, Acts of Man CD single (Bella Union) – mixed by
- 2009: Midlake, The Courage of Others EP (Bella Union) – mixed by
- 2009: Jason Isbell, Jason Isbell and The 400 Unit (Lightning Rod Records) – producer
- 2009: Jason Molina and Will Johnson, Molina and Johnson (Secretly Canadian) – recording engineer, drums
- 2009: Monsters of Folk (Conor Oberst, Jim James, Mike Mogis, M. Ward), Monsters of Folk (Shangri-La Music, Rough Trade Records) – mixer
- 2010: Glossary, Feral Fire (Liberty & Lament) – producer
- 2010: The Foxymorons, Bible Stories (self-released) – producer
- 2010: Micah P. Hinson, Micah P. Hinson And The "Pioneer Saboteurs" (Houston Party Records) – co-producer, mixed by, mastered by, backgrounds
- 2010: John Grant, Queen of Denmark (Bella Union) – mastering, mixing
- 2011: Sarah Jaffe, The Way Sound Leaves a Room (Kirtland Records) – engineer, co-producer
- 2011: True Widow, As High As the Highest Heavens and From the Center to the Circumference of the Earth (Kemado Records) – producer
- 2012: Dodgy, Stand Upright in a Cool Place (Strike Back Records) – mixing
- 2012: Jens Lekman, I Know What Love Isn't (Service/Secretly Canadian) – mixing
- 2012: Jay Farrar, Will Johnson, Anders Parker, and Yim Yames: New Multitudes (Rounder Records) – mixing
- 2013: True Widow, Circumambulation (Relapse Records) – producer
- 2013: Cody Jinks, Blacksheep EP (Late August Records) – drums
- 2013: Sean Nelson, Make Good Choices (Really Records) – drums
- 2014: Justin Townes Earle, Single Mothers (Vagrant Records, Loose Music) – drums
- 2014: The Bigsbys, Good Will Suitcase (Shiner Records) – producer
- 2014: Collin Herring, Some Knives (self-released) – producer
- 2015: Becca Stevens, Perfect Animal (Universal Music Classics) – mixed by
- 2015: The Foxymorons, Fake Yoga (Foxyphoton) – producer
- 2015: Denim Wonder (a.k.a. Daniel Hopkins, Carnation (self-released) – producer
- 2015: Justin Townes Earle, Absent Fathers (Vagrant Records, Loose Music) – drums
- 2015: Redeye, The Memory Layers (Lafolie Records/Microcultures) – producer
- 2016: Rodney Parker, Bomber Heights (self-released) – producer
- 2016: Midlake, The Trials Of Van Occupanther single (Bella Union) – "The Fairest Way" / "Festival" mixed by, mastered by
- 2017: Nikki Lane, Highway Queen (New West Records) – drums, engineer, percussion, producer
- 2017: BNQT, Volume 1 (Dualtone Records) – mixed by, mastered by
- 2017: Lift to Experience, The Texas-Jerusalem Crossroads (Bella Union) – engineer, mixing
- 2017: Sarah Jaffe, Bad Baby (Kirtland Records) – producer
- 2017: Tomkat, Icarus (self-released) – producer
- 2018: Josh T. Pearson, The Straight Hits! (Mute) – engineer
- 2018: Claire Morales, All That Wanting (self-released) – engineer
- 2018: Maps & Atlases, Lightlessness Is Nothing New (Barsuk Records) – mastering
- 2018: Elle King, Shake the Spirit (RCA Records) – co-producer
- 2018: John Grant, Love Is Magic (Bella Union) – drum programming, engineering, additional production by
- 2018: Paul Cauthen, Have Mercy EP (Lightning Rod Records) – engineer
- 2019: Paul Cauthen, Room 41 (Lightning Rod Records) – mixed by
- 2019: E.B. the Younger, To Each His Own (Bella Union) – engineer, mixing, executive producer, drums, percussion
- 2020: John Moreland, LP5 (Thirty Tigers) – producer
- 2021: Fishboy, Waitsgiving (Lauren Records)- drums, mixing

=== Centro-matic and associated projects ===
- 1995: Centro-matic, Redo the Stacks (Steve Records) – co-producer with Will Johnson, drums
- 1999: Centro-matic, Navigational (Idol Records) – co-producer with Will Johnson, drums
- 1999: Centro-matic, The Static vs. The Strings Vol. 1 (Idol/Quality Park) – drums
- 2000: Centro-matic, All the Falsest Hearts Can Try (Idol/Quality Park/Munich) – drums
- 2000: South San Gabriel, South San Gabriel Songs/Music (Idol/Munich) – drums
- 2001: Centro-matic, Distance and Clime (Idol/Munich) – drums
- 2002: South San Gabriel, Welcome, Convalescence (Munich/Undertow Music) – drums, keyboards
- 2002: Will Johnson, Murder of Tides (Undertow Music) – producer
- 2003: Centro-matic, Love You Just The Same (Misra Records/Munich) – drums, engineer
- 2005: South San Gabriel, The Carlton Chronicles: Not Until the Operation's Through (Misra/Munich/Houston Party) – drums
- 2006: Centro-matic, Fort Recovery (album) (Misra Records) – drums
- 2008: Centro-matic/South San Gabriel, Dual Hawks (Misra/Cooking Vinyl/Houston Party) – drums
- 2011: Centro-matic, Candidate Waltz (Undertow Music) – drums
- 2012: Will Johnson, Scorpion (Undertow Music) – producer
- 2014: Centro-Matic, Take Pride in Your Long Odds (Navigational Transmissions) – engineer, producer

== See also ==
- Centro-matic
- South San Gabriel
