= Steve Dawson (American musician) =

American singer-songwriter (born 1965)

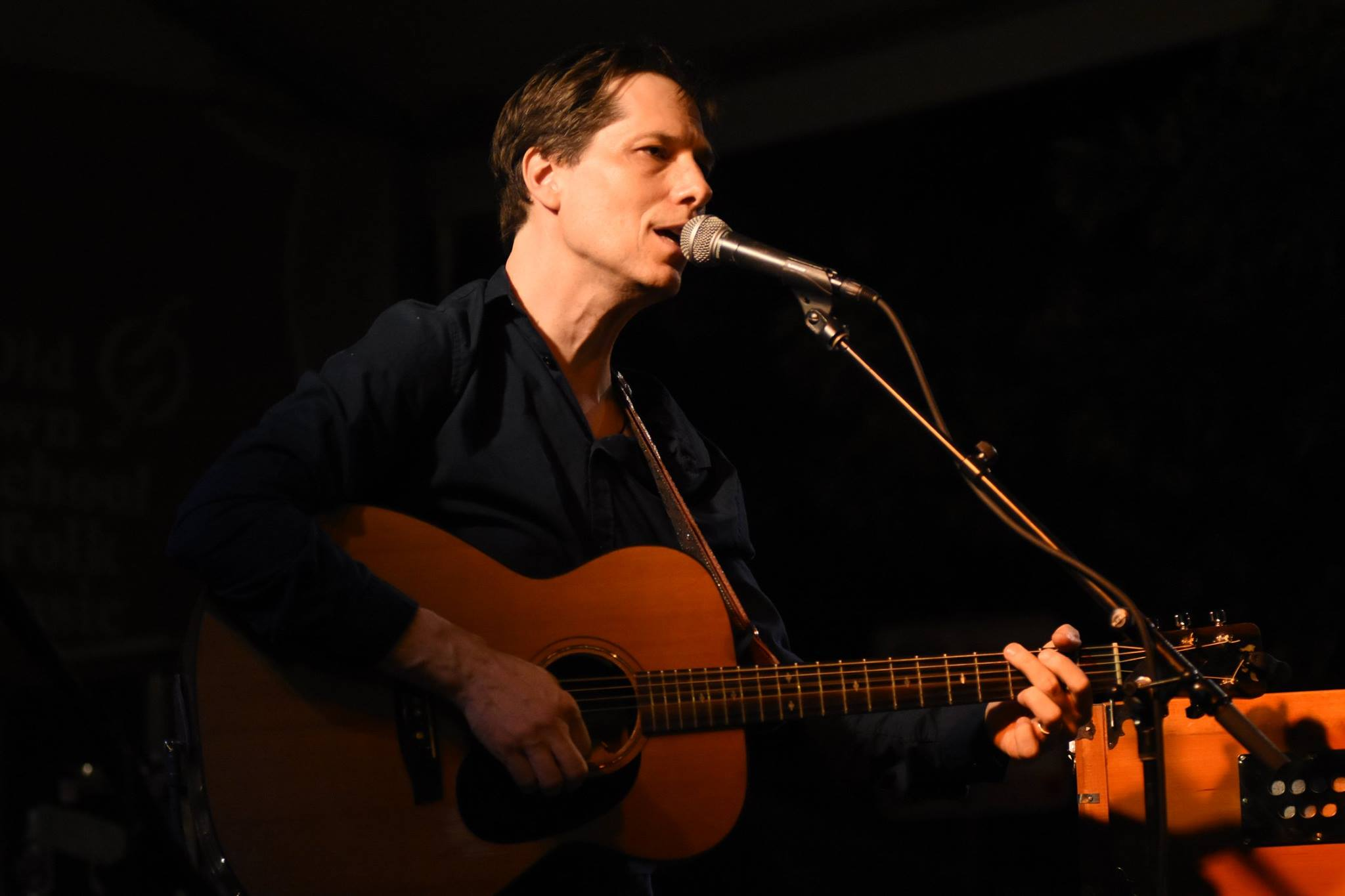
- Dawson performing in Chicago

Background information
- Birth name: Stephen John Dawson
- Born: April 5, 1965
- Origin: San Diego, California, U.S.
- Occupation(s): Musician, singer, songwriter
- Instrument(s): Guitar, vocals, bass, drums, keyboards
- Years active: 1988–present
- Labels: Undertow, Pravda, Kernel
- Website: stevedawsonmusic.com

Stephen John Dawson (born April 5, 1965) is an American singer-songwriter. He is known for his solo work, and for his work with the bands Dolly Varden, Stump the Host and Funeral Bonsai Wedding.

== Early life ==
Dawson was born in San Diego, California. In 1977, he moved to Hailey, Idaho, with his father, sister and step-mother. He learned to play guitar in seventh grade at Wood River Junior High School. He began writing songs and performing locally in 1980 before moving to Boston to attend the Berklee College of Music from 1983 to 1987. Dawson moved to Chicago, Illinois, in the fall of 1987. He formed the band Stump The Host with fiddle player Tom Murray and singer Diane Christiansen in 1988. By the early 1990s, Stump The Host expanded to include bassist Dave Gay, guitarist Brian Dunn, and drummer Leslie Santos and signed a songwriting contract with PolyGram Music. Stump The Host broke up in 1993. Dawson and Christiansen married in 1990 and had a child, Evangeline, in 1992. Dolly Varden was formed in 1994 with Dawson and Christiansen singing and writing songs, joined by drummer Matt Thobe and bassist Lisa Wertman. Wertman left in 1995 and was replaced by Mike Bradburn, and guitarist Mark Balletto joined the lineup. Dolly Varden toured in the United States and United Kingdom regularly between 1998 and 2003. Their album, The Dumbest Magnets, produced by Nashville's Brad Jones at Alex The Great studio, was released in 2000 in the US on Evil Teen records and licensed for release in the UK on Flying Sparks Records and in Europe on Fargo Records. After the release of Forgiven Now, also produced by Jones in Nashville, in 2002, the band took a hiatus and Dawson began focusing on solo projects. In 2004, Dawson began teaching songwriting and guitar at the Old Town School of Folk Music in Chicago.

== Solo career ==
Dawson's first solo album, Sweet Is The Anchor, was recorded in his home studio, Kernel Sound Emporium, and released on Undertow Records, August 23, 2005. The follow-up, I Will Miss The Trumpets And The Drums, was also recorded at Kernel Sound Emporium and released on Undertow Records, November 1, 2009. In 2013 Dawson formed Funeral Bonsai Wedding with vibraphonist Jason Adasiewicz, drummer Frank Rosaly, and bassist Jason Roebke to record their self-titled debut album at Kingsize Sound Labs in Chicago. In 2020 Dawson assembled Funeral Bonsai Wedding (with drummer Charles Rumback replacing Frank Rosaly) back at Kingsize with the Quartet Parapluie string quartet to record the album, Last Flight Out. Dawson self-released the album in May 2020. In April 2020 the City of Chicago Department of Cultural Affairs and Special Events awarded Dawson an Esteemed Artist Award. The grant helped him complete the album, At The Bottom Of A Canyon In The Branches Of A Tree. It was recorded in his home studio, Kernel Sound Emporium, and released on Pravda Records, July 16, 2021.

== Partial discography ==
=== Solo ===
- Sweet Is The Anchor (Undertow, 2005)
- I Will Miss The Trumpets And The Drums (Undertow, 2009)
- At The Bottom Of A Canyon In The Branches Of A Tree (Pravda, 2021)
- Ghosts (Pravda, 2024)

=== With Dolly Varden ===
- Mouthful of Lies (Mid-Fi Records, 1995)
- The Thrill of Gravity (Evil Teen Records, 1998)
- The Dumbest Magnets (Evil Teen, 2000)
- Forgiven Now (Undertow, 2002)
- The Panic Bell (Undertow, 2007)
- For a While (Mid-Fi, 2013)

=== With Funeral Bonsai Wedding ===
- Funeral Bonsai Wedding (Kernel Sound, 2014)
- Last Flight Out (Kernel Sound, 2020)

=== With Diane Christiansen ===
- Duets (Undertow, 2003)
