= Will Johnson (musician) =

American musician (born 1971)

- Born: March 23, 1971 (age 55); Kennett, Missouri, US
- Genres: Indie rock; alt-country
- Occupations: Musician; author; painter
- Instruments: Drums; percussion; guitar
- Years active: 1988–present
- Labels: Undertow Music Collective; Idol; Quality Park Records; Rounder; Steve Records; Munich Records; Misra; Cooking Vinyl; Houston Party; Sixgunlover; Secretly Canadian; Navigational Transmissions; Keeled Scales
- Member of: Centro-matic; South San Gabriel; Undertow Orchestra; Monsters of Folk; New Multitudes; Overseas
- Website: will-johnson.com

Will Johnson (born March 23, 1971) is an American musician, singer-songwriter, author, and painter who is the lead singer of the bands Centro-matic and South San Gabriel. Called "one of the most prolific artists in American indie rock" by AllMusic, Johnson has also released solo records and is a member of the bands Monsters of Folk, New Multitudes, and Overseas, and he has performed as part of the Undertow Orchestra. He is currently a member of Jason Isbell's band, the 400 Unit.

== Early life ==
Johnson was born in Kennett, Missouri. When he was 11 years old, his mother remarried, and the family moved to Killeen, Texas.

Johnson attended the University of North Texas, where he was involved in Denton's music scene. He double-majored in English and elementary education.

== Music career ==
=== Centro-Matic ===
Centro-Matic started in 1995 as Johnson's side-project while he was still in college, and he released the cassette Non-Directional Jetpack Race the same year. The full-length album Redo the Stacks followed in 1996, and by 1997, the project had evolved into a full band. As of 2014, the group had released 11 studio albums, and they announced their breakup that year.

=== South San Gabriel ===
With his Centro-Matic bandmates, Johnson formed South San Gabriel in 2001, and their lineup also includes a rotation of guests. Their first album, Songs/Music, was credited to Centro-Matic on its US release and to South San Gabriel in the Netherlands.

South San Gabriel released Welcome, Convalescence and The Carlton Chronicles – Not Until the Operation's Through in 2003 and 2005, respectively.

In 2008, the band issued Dual Hawks, a split double-album with Centro-Matic.

=== Molina and Johnson ===
In 2009, Johnson collaborated with the songwriter Jason Molina on the album Molina and Johnson. They recorded the album over a week and a half in early 2008. Johnson describes Molina as a "whirlwind of dedication and activity". Another collaboration was discussed, but it never came to fruition, before Molina's death in 2013.

In 2025, Johnson and former members of Molina's backing group Magnolia Electric Co. formed the Magnolia and Johnson Electric Co., a tribute band.

=== Undertow Orchestra ===
Johnson has performed as part of the Undertow Orchestra with David Bazan, Vic Chesnutt, and Mark Eitzel. Johnson first met Chestnutt in 1999 in Dallas. Chesnutt was a fan of Eitzel's music, and the two were longtime friends.

According to Johnson, Bob Andrews, the manager for the four musicians, had the idea in 2005 to create a band called the Undertow Orchestra from members of the Undertow Music Collective. Johnson said Chesnutt was adamant that the shows not feature any solo performances, with the members working to play each other's songs as backing musicians.

=== Monsters of Folk ===
Johnson performed with indie supergroup Monsters of Folk as the drummer on a 2009 tour. The lineup included Jim James, Conor Oberst, M. Ward, and Mike Mogis. The band toured the US and Europe and performed on the PBS show Austin City Limits in October 2010. Johnson became an official member of the band during that time.

=== New Multitudes ===
From 2009 to 2012, Johnson collaborated with Jay Farrar, Jim James, and Anders Parker on the Woody Guthrie archive project New Multitudes, which involved the four songwriters setting music to Guthrie's unrecorded lyrics. A tribute album was released in 2012, with a short US tour following.

=== Overseas ===
Johnson formed the band Overseas in 2009 with David Bazan and Matt and Bubba Kadane. An eponymous album was released in 2013.

=== The 400 Unit ===
In 2023, Johnson joined Jason Isbell's backing band, the 400 Unit.

== Writing ==
Johnson has authored a novel, If or When I Call, which was published by Goliad Media in 2021.

== Painting ==
Since 2008, Johnson has produced folk art paintings, mostly centering on the subject of baseball and its history. Commissions from friends eventually led to his work being exhibited in group and solo art shows.

== Discography ==
=== Solo ===
Studio albums

- Murder of Tides (2002)
- Vultures Await (2004)
- Scorpion (2012)
- Swan City Vampires (2015)
- Hatteras Night, a Good Luck Charm (2017)
- Wire Mountain (2019)
- El Capitan (2020)
- No Ordinary Crown (2023)
- Diamond City (2025)

Live album

- Survey/Voyage (2005)

EPs

- SCIV001 (2005)
- Little Raider (2011)
- Sleuthed/Full Cuts (2024)

Singles

- "The Riot Jack / I Did a Terrible Thing" (2004), with the Paper Chase
- "Blackest Sparrow / Darkest Night" (2007)
- "Inclined / Moccasin Bones" (2016), with Justin Peter Kinkel-Schuster
- "Patient, Patient Man / Uinta" (2017)

Collaborations

- Molina and Johnson (2009), with Jason Molina
- New Multitudes (2012), with Jay Farrar, Anders Parker, and Yim Yames
- Overseas: Overseas (2013)
- Marie/Lepanto: Tenkiller (2018)
- Marie/Lepanto: Gulf Collide (2021)
- Marie/Lepanto: The Fix Is On (2022)

=== with Centro-Matic ===
- Redo the Stacks (1996)
- Navigational (1999)
- The Static vs. the Strings Vol. 1 (1999)
- All the Falsest Hearts Can Try (1999)
- South San Gabriel Songs/Music (2000)
- Distance and Clime (2001)
- Love You Just the Same (2003)
- Fort Recovery (2006)
- Dual Hawks split double album with South San Gabriel (2008)
- Candidate Waltz (2011)
- Take Pride in Your Long Odds (2014)

=== with South San Gabriel ===
- Songs/Music (2000)
- Welcome, Convalescence (2003)
- The Carlton Chronicles – Not Until the Operation's Through (2005)
- Dual Hawks split double album with Centro-Matic (2008)
