= Murder of Tides =

Murder Of Tides

Studio album by Will Johnson
- Released: April 2002
- Genre: Rock
- Label: Undertow 2002

Professional ratings
Review scores
Source	Rating
Allmusic	4/5 stars

Murder of Tides is the first solo album by Centro-Matic and South San Gabriel leader Will Johnson. It was released in 2002 as a joint venture between Johnson and his long-time manager Bob Andrews at Undertow Music Collective.

== Track listing ==
1. Murder of Tides (Westerlies)
2. Commonly Linked
3. The Riot Jack
4. Philo Manitoba
5. Karcher's Contacts
6. Re-run Pills
7. River Koltolwash
8. In a Motionless Way
9. Tent of Total Mystery
10. The Yellow Signals
