= Welcome, Convalescence =

Studio album by South San Gabriel
- Released: April 2003
- Recorded: January 2002
- Studio: Brent Best's house, Denton, Texas
- Genre: Rock
- Label: Munich/Undertow

Welcome, Convalescence is the second album by South San Gabriel, recorded at Slobberbone singer Brent Best's Denton house in January 2002 and released in April 2003 by Munich Records.

The album features all of the members of singer Will Johnson's main band, Centro-Matic, as well as Best on guitars and Joe Butcher of Pleasant Grove on pedal steel guitar.

== Reception ==
Professional ratings
Review scores
Source	Rating
Allmusic	4/5 stars

Allmusic reviewer John Schacht gave it a 4-star review, calling it "one of those brilliantly despondent records so gorgeously executed it lifts your spirit just to be able to feel its sadness", and "a melancholic masterpiece". No Depression commented on its "beautifully languid melodies that exert a subtle, hypnotic pull", stating "Quiet desperation rarely sounds this enchanting." The Austin Chronicle's Michael Chamy gave it three and a half stars, stating "all eight tracks are winners" and describing it as "the summer album you want to hear while nestled up to the air-conditioner after coming in from the 100-degree heat. The definition of cool."

The Manchester Evening News gave it a more mixed review, stating "like the eponymous river, too much of this album just flows by murkily". The Chicago Tribune was similarly ambivalent, stating "Will Johnson's songs are undeniably pretty, but the slow pace and his affected, sleepy drawl can be distracting."

== Track listing ==
1. "New Brookland"
2. "Saint Augustine"
3. "Smelling Medicinal"
4. "Everglades"
5. "Like a Madman"
6. "Evangline"
7. "Ariza/284"
8. "The Splinter Angelic"

== Personnel ==
- Will Johnson - vocals, guitars
- Scott Danbom - vocals, keyboards, violin
- Mark Hedman - bass, guitars
- Matt Pence - drums, keyboards
- Brent Best - guitars
- Bryan Vandivier - guitars
- Joe Butcher - pedal steel guitar, organ, mellotron
