= Fort Recovery (disambiguation) =

Fort Recovery may refer to:

- Fort Recovery, a fort from 1793 in Ohio
- Fort Recovery, Ohio, a present-day village near the Ohio fort
- Fort Recovery, Tortola, a fort from 1620 in the British Virgin Islands
- Fort Recovery (album), a 2006 album by Centro-Matic
