= Monsters of Folk (album) =

2009 album by Monsters of Folk

Studio album by Monsters of Folk
- Released: September 22, 2009
- Studio: Shangri-La Studio (Malibu, California); ARC (Omaha, Nebraska)
- Genre: Alternative rock, indie folk
- Length: 54:37
- Language: English
- Label: Shangri-La Music, Rough Trade
- Producer: Mike Mogis

Monsters of Folk is the first and only studio album by American indie rock supergroup Monsters of Folk, a group consisting of the artists Jim James, Conor Oberst, M. Ward, and Mike Mogis. Originally slated for release in 2010, the album was released through Shangri-La Music and Rough Trade Records on September 22, 2009.

== Reception ==
Professional ratings
Review scores
Source	Rating
AllMusic	3.5/5 stars
Drowned in Sound	7/10
The Guardian	4/5 stars
Mojo	#191, p.99
The Observer	4/5 stars
Pitchfork Media	6.5/10
Q	4/5 stars
Rolling Stone	4/5 stars
Sputnikmusic	4.5/5 stars
The Times	4/5 stars

=== Critical ===
The album, whose title was a play on the concert series "Monsters of Rock", was well received by critics. Music magazines Q, Mojo, and Rolling Stone each awarded it four stars out of five. British newspapers The Guardian and The Times also gave the album a four-out-of-five rating, the latter stating that "this supergroup really is super." USA Today called the album a "harmonious and occasionally electrified blend of folk-rock, country and white soul."

However, People magazine gave the album two-and-a-half out of four stars, saying that "There's so much talent in this supergroup—M. Ward, My Morning Jacket's Jim James, and Bright Eyes' Conor Oberst and Mike Mogis—that you kind of expect more from them", but, "Still, dreamy tunes like the soulful 'Dear God (Sincerely M.O.F.)' will help tame the beast within".

=== Commercial ===
Monsters of Folk peaked at number 15 on the Billboard 200, and charted in the Top 10 of five other Billboard charts.

== Track listing ==
All songs written by Monsters of Folk (though "Dear God (Sincerely M.O.F.)" contains a sample of Trevor Dandy's 1970 song "Is There Any Love").

1. "Dear God (Sincerely M.O.F.)" – 5:07
2. "Say Please" – 2:48
3. "Whole Lotta Losin'" – 2:45
4. "Temazcal" – 3:49
5. "The Right Place" – 3:48
6. "Baby Boomer" – 2:53
7. "Man Named Truth" – 3:51
8. "Goodway" – 2:01
9. "Ahead of the Curve" – 3:40
10. "Slow Down Jo" – 3:21
11. "Losin Yo Head" – 4:37
12. "Magic Marker" – 3:20
13. "Map of the World" – 4:24
14. "The Sandman, the Brakeman and Me" – 3:23
15. "His Master's Voice" – 4:50

2024 reissue bonus tracks (recorded in 2012 with Will Johnson)

16. "Dear to the Assassin" – 3:32
17. "Sweet Silence" – 3:45
18. "The Living Thing" – 2:50
19. "Museum Guard" – 4:24
20. "Disappeared" – 2:13

== Personnel ==
- Jim James – vocals (1–3, 5, 6, 11, 12, 15), backing vocals (4, 7–10, 13, 14), guitars (1, 5, 11–13, 15), bass guitar (3, 4, 6–8), keyboards (1, 3, 5, 11, 12, 15), drum programming (1, 3), drums (2, 5, 9, 15), percussion (3, 13), sound effects (15)
- Conor Oberst – vocals (1–4, 6, 7, 9, 13), backing vocals (5, 8, 11, 12, 14, 15), guitars (2, 4, 5, 7–9, 13, 15), baritone guitar (12), bass guitar (1), keyboards (5, 10, 11), drums (6, 11), steel drum (10), percussion (6)
- M. Ward – vocals (1–3, 6, 8, 10, 14) backing vocals (4, 5, 7, 9, 11–13, 15), guitars (1, 3, 4, 6–11, 13, 14), bass guitar (2, 5, 12), synth bass (13), keyboards (3, 9, 11, 12, 15)
- Mike Mogis – vocals (5), backing vocals (2, 7), guitars (1, 2, 5, 6, 8–10, 12, 13, 15), bass guitar (9–11), baritone guitar (3, 7), mandolin (5, 7, 8), keyboards (1, 2, 4, 9, 14), drum programming (4), drums (12), bongos (10), percussion (7, 9, 10, 12–14), sound effects (1, 15)

== Charts ==
Chart performance for Monsters of Folk
Chart (2009)	Peak position
Australian Albums (ARIA)	91
Belgian Albums (Ultratop Flanders)	34
Dutch Albums (Album Top 100)	42
Swedish Albums (Sverigetopplistan)	44
UK Albums (OCC)	43
US Billboard 200	15
US Billboard Top Alternative Albums	6
US Billboard Folk Albums	3
US Billboard Top Heatseekers	1
US Billboard Independent Albums	3
US Billboard Top Rock Albums	8
