= For a While =

For a While may refer to:

- "For a While" (song), a song by Stellar
- For a While (album), an album by Dolly Varden
