= South San Gabriel =

South San Gabriel may refer to:

- South San Gabriel, California
- South San Gabriel (band), an alternative country band based in Denton, Texas, named after the San Gabriel river fork
