= Steve Dawson (disambiguation) =

Steve Dawson may refer to:

- Steve Dawson (born 1952), English bass guitarist
- Steve Dawson (American musician) (born 1965), singer-songwriter
- Steve Dawson (Canadian musician), musician and music producer
- Steve Dawson, British comedy writer of the Dawson Bros.
