= Vultures Await =

Studio album by Will Johnson
- Released: September 7, 2004
- Genre: Rock
- Label: Misra/Munich

Professional ratings
Review scores
Source	Rating
Allmusic	4.5/5 stars

Vultures Await is Centro-Matic's front man Will Johnson's second solo album.

== Track listing ==
1. Catherine Dupree
2. Just to Know What You’ve Been Dreaming
3. Vultures Await
4. Just Some Silence
5. Sleep a While
6. As Victims Would
7. Closing Down My House
8. On, Caledonia
9. Your Bulldozer
10. Thousand Other Parts
11. Fly, My Sweet Dove
12. Nothin’ But Godzilla
