= All the Falsest Hearts Can Try =

All The Falsest Hearts Can Try

Studio album by Centro-Matic
- Released: 2000
- Genre: Rock
- Label: Quality Park; Munich Records
- Producer: Centro-Matic

Centro-Matic chronology
The Static vs. The Strings Vol. 1 (1999)	All The Falsest Hearts Can Try (2000)	South San Gabriel Songs/Music (2000)

Professional ratings
Review scores
Source	Rating
AllMusic	4/5 stars
The Encyclopedia of Popular Music	4/5 stars
The Independent	3/5 stars
NME	4/5 stars

All The Falsest Hearts Can Try is a full-length album by Centro-Matic, released in 2000.

== Critical reception ==
Texas Monthly wrote that the band's "indie-rock allegiances remain strong enough that many songs here are actually oblique, bittersweet meditations on the mythology of those allegiances." NME called the album "yet more rough-hewn genius-in-the-making from the same American heartlands that threw up the likes of The Flaming Lips and Uncle Tupelo." The Chicago Tribune called it "brilliantly raw," writing: "Here is a group of musicians whose talent and experience pulls them toward perfection, though they'll happily sacrifice technical recording quality for musical quantity." MTV wrote that "the sonic mudbath, along with Centro-matic's deliberate bush-league musicianship, exquisitely compliments [Will] Johnson's songs, a twangy mix of Crazy Horse raunch and sweet acoustic balladeering."

== Track listing ==
1. Cool That You Showed Us How
2. The Blisters May Come
3. Call the Legion in Tonight
4. In the Strategy Room
5. Huge in Every City
6. Saving a Free Seat
7. Save Us, Tothero
8. Most Everyone Will Find
9. Gas Blowin’ Out of Our Eyes
10. Hercules Now!
11. Magic Cyclops
12. Would Go Over
13. Members of The Show ‘em How It's Done
14. Aerial Spins/Nautical Wilderness

== Personnel ==
- Will Johnson - vocals, guitars
- Scott Danbom - vocals, keyboards, violin
- Mark Hedman - bass
- Matt Pence - drums
