= Glurp Records =

Glurp Records is a U.S. independent record label started in Austin, TX in 2001 and now located in Seattle, WA. The label released records by Grand Champeen, The Deathray Davies, Li'l Cap'n Travis, and The Only Children. They also released the Elvis Costello tribute CD Almost You: The Songs of Elvis Costello and the final release from Brooklyn's The Mendoza Line.
