= Pikahsso =

American rapper

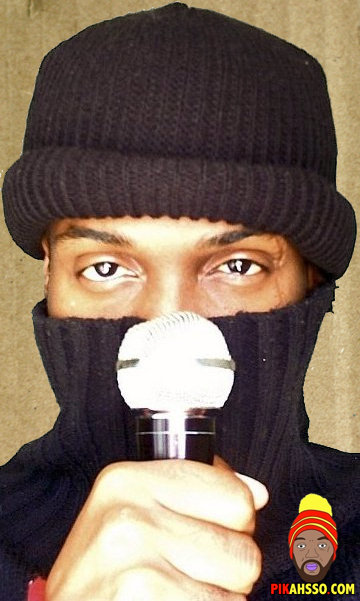
Pikahsso

Terry Wayne Jones Jr. (born February 1, 1970), primarily known by his stage name Pikahsso, is an American hip hop artist from Dallas, Texas.

== Life and career ==
Jones grew up in South Dallas, Texas. He graduated from Lincoln High School where he sang bass in the choir, and began to develop his skill through vocals and visuals which shaped his stage name. He later attended the Dallas branch of the Columbia School of Broadcasting (now defunct) in the late 1980s.

Jones was a member of the hip hop group Dysphunkshunal, which also recorded introductions for segments such as the Skip Murphy Morning Show on K104 in the mid-1990s. He later signed to Idol Records from 2006-2008 as a member of the group PPT. He has worked alongside music producer Symbolyc One (S1), who has co-produced tracks for Beyoncé and Kanye West, and who is also a member of the group Strange Fruit Project. Jones and his label mates released the video for “Down South Girl” that featured Strange Fruit Project in 2006, which was also produced by S1. Jones was also featured in Symbolyc One's Music Box album as well as hip hop producer Erotic D's The Black Bruce Willis, which was released in late 2008.

He, along with then group PPT, created the 2006 Dallas Mavericks playoffs theme song "Roudy, Loud, and Proud" shooting the video at the American Airlines Center in Dallas, which was announced by Dallas Mavericks owner Mark Cuban. The song was performed during the playoffs. The group has been featured in SPIN Magazine, and was recognized as best Rap/Hip-Hop group by Dallas Observer in 2007. The group mutually split up due to irreconcilable differences in mid-2008.

Jones is known for his knowledge of the hip hop music scene of the city of Dallas, Texas. His efforts to preserve the hip hop music history of his city are noted through his consistent acknowledgement and mentioning of legendary figures past and present. Dick Sullivan with D Magazine states, "The history of rap in the Metroplex is a story Pikahsso tells with unflagging enthusiasm and pride, because, in the tradition of hip hop self-reference, it is his story too.

Jones is currently a member of the Hip Hop duo AwkQuarius based in Dallas, Texas. He also co-owns the production company WhackPiktures with close friend and AwkQuarius member Walter Archey III, who goes by the stage name Tahiti. AwkQuarius was the opening act for the taping of a Showtime Network special featuring Paul Mooney.

The hip hop duo created the Fat Albert N the Hood YouTube cartoon series, which Giant Magazine describes as "a 180 from the original". The series gained exposure from the likes of drummer Questlove from the group The Roots, and rapper Q-Tip.

Jones was a show co-host for Questlove along with hip hop artist Bavu Blakes. He has been a frequent subject in the Dallas Observer, and continues his work on upcoming music projects.

== Music style ==
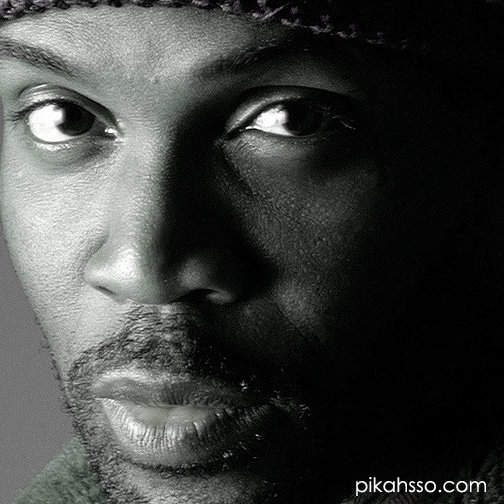
Pikahsso

Jones has been influenced by the styles of artists such as Big Daddy Kane, Kool G. Rap, J. Dilla, Stevie Wonder, Erykah Badu, Marvin Gaye, The Pharcyde, A Tribe Called Quest, and music instrumentalist and composer Miguel Atwood-Ferguson.

Known for adding the letter “p” to creative word play along with his singing vocals and free-styles in his music, Jones credits himself as the founder of what he calls “Celestial Brainphunk”. He defines his music style as a concoction of hip hop, R&B, jazz, and salsa elements combined with derivatives of funk. In an interview with MTV Rapfix Live, Rapper Fabolous discussed Pikahsso’s video for “P-00,” stating of his musical style “…it caught my attention just from being different.” In the same interview, MTV host Sway Calloway stated that his was “definitely a different style for coming out of Dallas.” Questlove's site Okayplayer.com reviews Jones' work in PPT's first album titled Tres Monos in Love stating, "The beats are mainly upbeat soul, which provides a canvas for Pikahsso’s harmonizing."

== Personal life ==
Jones has one daughter, and has never been married.

== Discography ==
Singles	Year
Jebruary	2012
Whackwordz	2012
Angela Davis	2012
BPF1 "Honesty"	2011
I've Laust Mie Mynd	2011
Hoc and Piky	2011
P-00	2009
VERB	2007
Faleyuh	2007
Verb "BrainPhunk"	2005

Features in Singles	Year
Come Together by G.Y.L.O.	2009
U Need Dat by Erotic D	2008
Smiley Faces by Bavu Blakes	2008
Money Makin Anthem by Gugu	1998

Albums	Record label	Year
Pikahsso for Dummies 1.0	Verbadelyck Records	2011
DENGLISH	Idol Records	2008
Tres Monos in Love	Idol Records	2006
