= Black Tie Dynasty =

Black Tie Dynasty is an American indie rock band from Fort Worth, Texas.

The group signed with Idol Records in 2004, releasing their debut-EP the following year. Movements, their first full-length album followed in 2006 on the same label. It featured the single "Tender", which peaked at No. 8 on the Billboard Hot Dance Singles Sales chart. The group toured with Guided By Voices, VHS or Beta, and Spoon following the release of the album. Their follow-up album Down Like Anyone was released independently on November 29, 2008.

The band announced that it would be breaking up via MySpace on Monday, January 27, 2009. Apparently, they never went through with the breakup. They last performed on October 2, 2010, at the Granada Theatre in Dallas, TX.

Cory Watson and Brian McCorquodale have moved on to a new band called Mon Julien which debuted January 14, 2011. Eddie Thomas put out two albums with The Crash That Took Me and Blake McWhorter now plays in These Machines Are Winning. although McWhorter also contributes to Mon Julien as well. They published their latest album, Steady, on May 10, 2024.

== Members ==
- Cory Watson - vocals, guitar
- Michael Ratliff - drums(2022–present), *Eddie Thomas - drums (drummer 2004-2021)
- Blake McWhorter - bass
- Brian McCorquodale - keyboards, vocals

== Discography ==
- This Stays Between Us EP (Idol Records, 2005)
- Bloody Basin split EP with [DARYL] (Idol Records, 2005)
- Movements (Idol Records, 2006)
- Tender single / EP (Idol Records, 2006)
- I Like U single / EP (Idol Records, 2006)
- Down Like Anyone (Independently Released, 2008) Guests performers include Douglas Edwards (strings, orchestration), Thesis (vocals), Picnictyme formerly of PPT (vocals) and Jencey Hirunrusme of Smile Smile (vocals).
- Steady (Independently Released, 2024)
