= The Wee-Beasties =

American punk rock band

- Origin: Denton, Texas, United States
- Genres: Punk rock, skate punk
- Years active: 2000–Present
- Label: Idol Records Kill-O-Teen Records Grimace Records
- Members: Richard Haskins; Tessa McAuley; Tomo; Paul Burke; Kyle Harper; Salem Perry; Robert Hokamp; Trent Jones; Niin; Andres Noriega
- Past members: David Dutton; Aaron Dean; Chris Walker; Stephenie Blaise; Stephanie Holloway; John Wier; Chris Alan; Matt Pole; Randy Lincoln; Chris Hokamp; Bret Crow; Ali Pucket; Zack Haywood; Elizabeth Freeman; Anna-Marie Durbin; Alison Stauver; Eric Hutmacher; Brian Hutmacher; Crystal Puga; Phil Bleinberger; Zane Crownover; Shiloh Reeves; Jamie Stewart
- Website: thewee-beasties.com

The Wee-Beasties are a nine-piece punk rock band formed in 2000 by Richard Haskins. The band has had a longstanding cult following in the Denton area, playing upwards of fifty performances which they have claimed to be their "last show ever". Notably, they have performed at the 35 Conferette in 2011 and on the Warped Tour 2011. The Wee-Beasties began achieving more widespread notoriety in 2021, when their return to regularly scheduled shows garnered the attention of local publications Central Track and the Dallas Observer, which recognized the band as one of North Texas’ 10 Best Live Acts. During its spring ’22 tour, the LA Weekly called this Denton, TX, symphonic brass punk collective “the sort of band you might want to check out twice."

The Wee-Beasties' live performances are a spectacle known for onstage antics, and past shows have included BDSM demonstrations, Chippendales costumes, the punk rock burlesque, and heroic consumption of countless cans of Lone Star beer (or whatever is cheapest).

Fronted by the larger-than-life, beer-guzzling, mostly-naked Richard Haskins, the band consists of drums, two guitars, a bass and a colorful cast of horn players, including Richard Haskins, vocals; Tessa McAuley, vocals; Paul Burke, bass; Kyle Harper, guitar; Robert Hokamp, guitar; Trent Jones, drums; Tomo, trumpet; John Wier, trumpet; Niin, trumpet/keys; and Andres Noriega, trumpet. Over twenty years, the band's lineup has included dozens of musicians; the original members included bassist David Dutton and drummer Brian Hutmacher.

== Discography ==
=== Studio albums ===
- Party With Us! (2022)
- Kill Them! (2011)
- Early/Unreleased (2005)
- Listen Up, Motherfuckers! (2003)

=== 7" ===
- Until It’s Dead b/w Alcohol and Drug Abuse Lake (2025)
- Don't Shred On Me: Volume 1 [split w/ Brave Combo] (2011)

=== E.P. ===
- The Afterparty (2026)
- The Whole 7 Inches (2021)
- Fleshlight (2010)
- I See (2001)

=== Compilation ===
- KXT's Homegrown Bites: Vol.1

== Awards ==
- 2026 Dallas Entertainment Awards Best Punk Rock Act
- 2025 Dallas Entertainment Awards Best Punk Rock Act
- 2024 Fort Worth Weekly Best Regional Act
- 2023 Top 5 Fort Worth Weekly Best Regional Act
- 2021 Dallas Observer North Texas’ 10 Best Live Acts
- 2021 Fort Worth Weekly Shows of the Year
- 2011 Denton Record Chronicle's Best of Denton
- North Texas Music Hall of Fame - Class of 2011 Inductees
