= The Undertow Orchestra =

The Undertow Orchestra was an indie rock "supergroup" organized by Bob Andrews of Undertow Music Collective. The band existed only as a touring ensemble and consisted of "four of today's most under the radar, yet prolific singer-songwriters," David Bazan (of Pedro the Lion and Headphones), Mark Eitzel (of American Music Club), Will Johnson (of Centro-Matic), and Vic Chesnutt. Each band member took turns on stage playing his own songs, as the other members acted as his backing band. The group performed a live radio show.
