= Grand Champeen =

US rock band

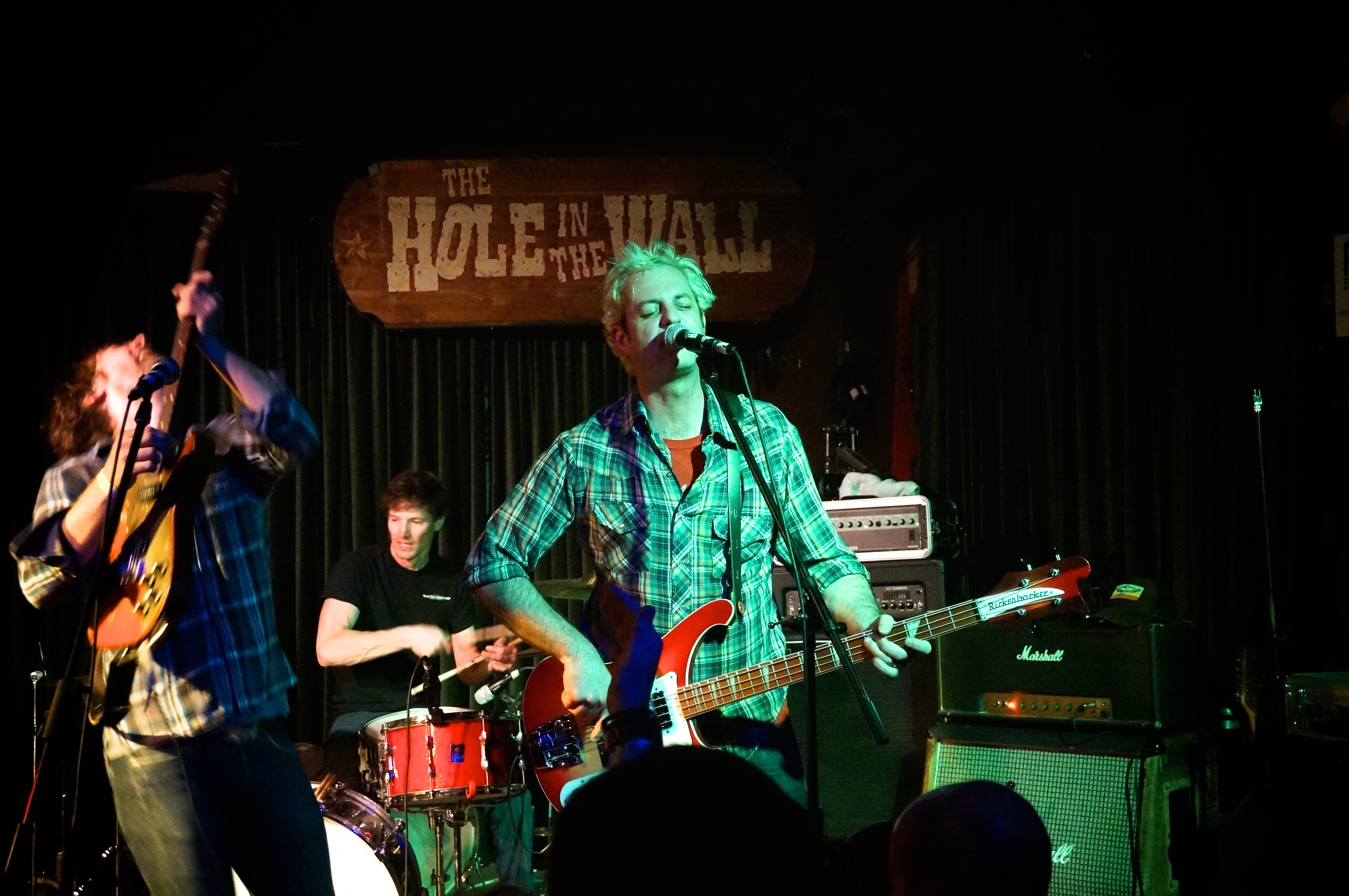
- Grand Champeen at SXSW 2014

Background information
- Genres: Rock
- Years active: 1997–present
- Members: Alex Livingstone; Channing Lewis; Michael Crow; Ned Stewart
- Past members: Will Minor; Rob Hargrove
- Website: GrandChampeen.com

Grand Champeen is an Austin, Texas-based rock band.

== Formation and early years ==
Guitarists/vocalists Channing Lewis and Michael Crow met drummer Ned Stewart while attending the private boarding school Woodberry Forest, located in Woodberry Forest, Virginia. As freshmen, they formed the cover band Frosted Megawheats with another student, Will Minor, on bass. After high school graduation in 1993, the group reconnected during summers while two of the band members, Crow and Lewis, attended University of Colorado-Boulder, and Stewart attended James Madison University.

In the summer of 1994, the group, now renamed Mucho Maas in homage to a character from Thomas Pynchon's The Crying of Lot 49, recorded an album of original songs in Chapel Hill, North Carolina. Mucho Maas featured fIREHOSE guitarist Ed Crawford on one song singing vocals. Shortly thereafter, Minor left the band.

Lewis and Crow returned to Boulder for college and recorded an album with Dave Back under the name "The Star-Free Press" in 1997. After graduation, they briefly considered moving to Minneapolis because of its thriving music scene, but eventually decided to relocate to Austin, Texas in the summer of 1997. They were joined by Ned Stewart and bassist Rob Hargrove, a University of Texas law student and Crow's friend from childhood. That formation of the band took the name Grand Champeen in late 1999.

== Grand Champeen ==
In January 2000, Grand Champeen self-released their debut album, the country-influenced Out Front by the Van. Out Front featured banjo, violin, and pedal steel added to a rock base sound. The band began playing regular shows in Austin as well as touring with The Damnations, Slobberbone, Richmond Fontaine, and Two Cow Garage. After the album's release, Hargrove left the band to focus on his studies and was replaced by Alex Livingstone, who played with the band at South by Southwest in March 2000. Livingstone was a childhood friend of Will Minor, from the early days in Virginia.

In 2002, Grand Champeen recorded Battle Cry for Help on Glurp Records. Battle Cry, recorded at a warehouse space off Pond Springs Road that was turned into Crow's recording studio, was considered by many journalists to be part of the alternative country genre, with songs built on steady slower twang-rich beats and at least one song featuring pedal steel guitar. The record was mixed by Mark Hallmann (Carole King).

In 2003, Grand Champeen released The One That Brought You, again on Glurp Records. The One That Brought You, again recorded at Crow's Pond Springs Road recording studio, was a conscious shift away from alt country towards energetic distorted guitars and enthusiastic driving beats built upon what became a core collaboration between Livingtone's rhythmic bass and Stewart's drumming. Also at this point, Livingstone started contributing more songwriting to the band, and Stewart had more fully developed his drumming style. The record was received positively, eventually voted #1 in The Austin Chronicle Texas Top 10 and was also named Album of the Year.

In 2007, in a shift to a tighter sound and artistic growth, the band released Dial "T" for This on In Music We Trust. The release reflected a more structured approach to layering sound and lyrics. It was recorded and mixed live, with no artificial editing.

In 2013, Re-vinyl Records released 2001's The One That Brought You remastered on vinyl by mastering engineer Jason Hamric.

Grand Champeen, who from their early days in Austin had built a reputation as one of the best live acts in town, is notable for live shows featuring a hard driving, heavy guitar punk-rock influenced sound typically featuring Lewis on Telecasters and Crow on Gibsons. The band spent much of their time, outside of regular shows in Austin at Room 710, Beerland, The Parish, and Hole In The Wall, constantly touring. The three songwriters of Champeen are Lewis, Crow, and Livingstone, each with a distinctive voice, and the band references The Replacements, Soul Asylum, the Jayhawks, and Hüsker Dü as integral to the development of their musical style.

In 2014, Grand Champeen continued to work on material for an upcoming album.

== Band members ==
The current lineup of Grand Champeen consists of:

- Michael Crow: guitar, vocals
- Alex Livingstone: bass, vocals
- Ned Stewart: drums
- Channing Lewis: vocals, guitar

== The Bremen Riot ==
In 2014, the members of Grand Champeen teamed up with Minneapolis ex-pat Mike Nicolai to form the band The Bremen Riot. They released the album PM Magazine in 2014.

== Gleeson ==
Originating in 2008 at local gigs around Austin, Almost There label founder Ty Chandler founded the band Gleeson, with Chandler on vocals and guitar and father and son pair Raul Vela III on lead guitar and Raul Vela IV on drums. Chandler eventually recruited Channing Lewis and Michael Crow to play and record with them. Gleeson released multiple records on the Almost There label and to Bandcamp. Gleeson II was released as a gatefold double vinyl LP as well as a double CD. The band was named to The Austin Chronicle's 2010 Texas Top 9 and 2014's Top 10.

== Past Prayers ==
In 2010, Alex Livingstone, armed with a backlog of songs he had written, created a project with Jim Fredley (Milton Mapes) to record and perform what would become two records under the moniker Past Prayers.

== Discography ==
=== Grand Champeen ===
LPs

- 2000: Out Front By The Van (GC Recordings)
- 2001: Battle Cry for Help (Expansion Team in 2001, Glurp Records in 2002 re-release)
- 2003: The One That Brought You (Glurp Records)
- 2007: Dial "T" For This (In Music We Trust)

EPs

- 2010: ACL Presents Satellite Sets (self-released)

Singles

- 2002: Ol' Yeller – A Major And A Minor / Reward

Contributions

- 1997: Munly, De Dar He (Smooch) – Channing Lewis and Michael Crow (performers)
- 1997: 'The Star-Free Press' Broken Bat Singles (Espalda Records) – Channing Lewis and Michael Crow (performers)
- 2002: Okkervil River, Don't Fall In Love With Everyone You See – Channing Lewis (saxophone on "Lady Liberty")
- 2002: Rock Sound Volume 53 (Rock Sound) – track 7, "Cottonmouth"
- 2002: Awesome II (Munich Records) – track 11, "The Sound That Made My Year"
- 2003: Almost You: The Songs of Elvis Costello (Glurp Records) – track 4, "No Action"
- 2004: Who and Who: A Tribute to the Who (Almost There) – track 8, "Heaven and Hell"
- 2005: The Latest (Philip Morris USA) – track 11, "The Good Slot"
- 2007: Turn 1 (Almost There) – track 12, "Full of Shit"
- 2007: Turn 2 (Almost There) – track 17, "Bayonet"
- 2007: Turn 3 (Almost There) – track 10, "Destructive Ear"
- 2008: Thank You Friends: An Almost There Records Tribute to Big Star (Almost There) – track 3, "Daisy Glaze"
- 2008: Turn 4 (Almost There) – track 15, "Can't Give It Away"
- 2009: Turn 5 (Almost There) – track 3, "Pro Gear, Pro Attitude"

=== Gleeson ===
LPs

- 2009: The Very Very Best of Gleeson (Almost There) – featuring Channing Lewis
- 2013: Gleeson II (Almost There) – featuring Channing Lewis and Michael Crow
- 2014: Seven Songs (Almost There) – featuring Channing Lewis and Michael Crow
- 2016: Curse My Lucky Stars (Almost There) – featuring Channing Lewis and Michael Crow

Singles

- 2005: It's Alright (acoustic version) – Originally released on Almost There Record's Turn 1 compilation
- 2015: Troll Day – Originally released on Thank Your Lucky Stars

=== Past Prayers ===
- 2010: Past Prayers (self-released)
- 2013: Seconds (self-released)

=== The Bremen Riot ===
- 2013: PM Magazine (The Bremen Riot – TBR01)
