= Circumambulation (album) =

Studio album by True Widow
- Released: July 23, 2013
- Genres: Shoegaze, stoner rock, slowcore
- Length: 44:25
- Label: Relapse Records
- Producer: Matt Pence

True Widow chronology
As High As the Highest Heavens and From the Center to the Circumference of the Earth (2011)	Circumambulation (2013)

Singles from Circumambulation
- 1. "HW:R" Released: June 4, 2013

Professional ratings
Aggregate scores
Source	Rating
Metacritic	83/100
Review scores
Source	Rating
AllMusic	4/5 stars
Exclaim!	8/10 stars
Filter	84%
Metal Hammer	4/5 stars
Now	3/5 Ns
Pitchfork	7.2/10
PopMatters	9/10 stars
Spin	8/10 stars

Circumambulation is the third studio album from American stoner rock band True Widow. It was released in July 2013 under Relapse Records.

== Track listing ==
All tracks are written by D.H. Phillips, except where noted.

No.	Title	Length
1.	"Creeper"	5:50
2.	"S:H:S"	6:05
3.	"Four Teeth"	6:16
4.	"Numb Hand"	4:13
5.	"Trollstigen" (Nicole Estill)	7:18
6.	"I:M:O"	4:45
7.	"HW:R" (Phillips, Estill)	4:49
8.	"Lungr"	5:09

== Personnel ==
- Dan Phillips – vocals, guitar
- Nicole Estill – bass, vocals
- Timothy "Slim" Starks – drums, percussion
