= Idol Records =

- Parent company: Idol Records Group
- Founded: 1993
- Founder: Erv Karwelis
- Genre: Rock, indie rock, punk rock, hip hop, instrumental, heavy metal, Americana
- Country of origin: United States
- Location: Dallas, Texas
- Official website: idolrecords.com

Idol Records is a Dallas, Texas-based record label and publishing company founded in 1993 by Erv Karwelis, who serves as president of the label. Its roster consists of bands such as The O's, Dead Flowers, The Crash That Took Me, Here Holy Spain, Sponge, Watershed, and Flickerstick. In January 2009, Idol launched an art-pop sub label Exploding Plastic Records. The first band signed to the label was Little Black Dress.

Idol Records received the Dallas Observer Music Award for "Best Record Label" 2002, 2003, 2004, 2005, 2006 & 2007.

Idol Records is a member of the National Academy of Recording Arts and Sciences (NARAS).

== Artists ==
- ADMIRALS
- The American Fuse
- Aztec Milk Temple
- Billyclub
- Black Tie Dynasty
- Boys Named Sue
- Calhoun
- Centro-matic
- Charming Gardeners
- Chomsky
- Clumsy
- Cold Cash Machine
- The Crash That Took Me
- [DARYL]
- Darstar
- Dead Flowers
- The Deathray Davies
- Descender
- Dove Hunter
- The Fags
- The Falcon Project
- Feisty Cadavers
- Flickerstick
- Funland
- GBH
- Gaston Light
- Gunfighter
- Hagfish
- Here Holy Spain
- Hoarse
- Chris Holt
- Jetta in the Ghost Tree
- Trey Johnson
- Will Johnson
- Little Black Dress
- Lorelei K
- Macavity
- The Mag Seven
- Matthew Roberts
- Mazinga Phaser
- Mitra
- MOTORCADE
- Moxy Roxx
- Name the Moon
- New Rising Son
- The O's
- Old 97's
- The Paper Chase
- Pervis
- Vanessa Peters
- Pikahsso
- Todd Pipes
- Protest
- PPT
- Puke A Rama
- Red Like Heat
- Glen Reynolds
- Secrecies
- Shibboleth
- Skeemin' NoGoods
- The Slack
- Sponge
- Tahiti
- These Machines Are Winning
- VEHICLES
- The Warden
- Watershed
- The Wee-Beasties

== See also ==
- List of record labels

== General references ==
- Black White Read Idol Records Feature
- Dallas Observer Indie label feature
