= Navigational (album) =

Studio album by Centro-matic
- Released: 1999
- Recorded: 1998
- Genre: Rock
- Length: 48:00
- Label: Idol Records
- Producer: Matt Pence and Will Johnson

Professional ratings
Review scores
Source	Rating
Allmusic	4/5 stars

Navigational is the second full-length album by Centro-Matic. The album was recorded by Matt Pence in Milstadt, Illinois, at Jay Farrar's studio.

== Track listing ==
All songs were written by Will Johnson.

1. Never Mind the Sounds
2. All Hail the Label Scouts
3. Ruin This With Style
4. With Respect to Alcohol
5. Ordinary Days
6. This Vicious Crime
7. Cross You that Way.
8. The Ballad of Private Rifle Sound
9. Not Forever Now.
10. Numbers One and Three.
11. Lasted ’til Today.
12. Hazlitt Takes to Shore
13. Line. Connection. Aim
14. The Panacea Tonight
15. The Massacre Went Well
16. The Beautiful Ones

== Personnel ==
- Will Johnson – vocals, guitars
- Scott Danbom – vocals, keyboards, violin
- Mark Hedman – bass
- Matt Pence – drums
