= In Music We Trust =

American music webzine, publicity company, and record label

In Music We Trust is a music webzine, publicity company, and record label based in Portland, Oregon. It was established as a webzine in July 1997 by Alex Steininger and his friend Ryan O'Neill. Its original goal was to help promote work by new artists. Steininger founded the website after losing his job at another online magazine, when he contacted O'Neill for his web design expertise and asked him for help. The website was named a "cool site" by the Open Directory Project.

== Record label ==
In 2001, Steininger started In Music We Trust Records; its first release was Sean Croghan's debut solo album. That year, the Willamette Week reported that "In just a few short years of music obsession, Steininger has transformed himself into a dynamo of Portland's music scene, releasing albums by local supremos Luther Russell, Sean Croghan and Joe Davis." In 2004, the label released Matt Sharp's debut solo album, making it their biggest release to date at the time.

=== Artists ===
Notable artists who have released one or more albums on In Music We Trust Records include:

- Casey Neill
- Grand Champeen
- Hillstomp
- I Can Lick Any Sonofabitch in the House
- Luther Russell
- Matt Sharp
- Ruth Ruth
