= The Foxymorons =

- Origin: Mesquite, Texas, U.S.
- Genres: Guitar pop
- Years active: 1994–present
- Labels: Heatstroke Records, Foxyphoton Records
- Members: David Dewese, Jerry James
- Website: www.foxymorons.com

The Foxymorons are an American guitar pop musical duo from Mesquite, Texas, formed in 1994. The band consists of childhood friends David Dewese and Jerry James.

== History ==
Dewese and James met at church camp when they were both in high school, and later pretended to be in a band called the "Foxymorons" later in their teenage years, although, at the time, they neither wrote songs nor played music. They later released a single that they mailed to radio stations, fanzines and distributors. Eventually, Mel Cheplowitz of American Pop Project Records asked if they wanted to release an album, and they agreed. The band released its debut album, Calcutta, in 1999, to positive reviews, despite the fact that, at the time, the band had not played a live show. Calcutta was recorded long distance, with Dewese and James sending tapes back and forth from Dallas to Nashville. The band played their first gig at South by Southwest in March 2000.

Shortly after Calcutta was released, the band continued collaborating long distance, with Dewese living in Nashville and James remaining in Texas. In 2001, the band released its second album, Rodeo City, which was recorded in a similar manner as their first. In 2005, the band released its third album, Hesitation Eyes, which they also recorded by sending tapes through the mail.

The band's fourth album, Bible Stories, was recorded in Nashville and released in 2010. Their fifth album, Fake Yoga, was released in 2015 and featured Will Johnson on drums.

== Critical reception ==
Fake Yoga has a score of 73 out of 100 on Metacritic, indicating "generally favorable reviews". Magnet called it "a return to the primal sound of their debut." Robert Christgau wrote that on the album, the Foxymorons "attain the pop-punk grail: 10 tough, catchy, ebullient, stealth-strange songs in 32 minutes."

== Discography ==
- Calcutta (1999)
- Rodeo City (2001)
- Hesitation Eyes (2005)
- Bible Stories (2010)
- Fake Yoga (2015)
