= Redo the Stacks =

Redo The Stacks

Studio album by Centro-Matic
- Released: March 1996
- Recorded: 1995
- Genre: Rock
- Length: 52:00
- Label: Steve Records
- Producer: Matt Pence and Will Johnson

Redo The Stacks is the first full-length album by Centro-Matic. The album was recorded and mixed in Denton, TX by Matt Pence. All songs were written and performed by Will Johnson.

== Track listing ==
1. "Pilot’s On the Wall, The"
2. "Parade of Choosers"
3. "Terrified Anyway"
4. "Post-It Notes From the State Hospital"
5. "Fidgeting Wildly"
6. "The Cannon-Ball Shot"
7. "Part of This Accident"
8. "Am I the Manager or am I Not?"
9. "Cannot Compete"
10. "Are You Ready for the Shutdown?"
11. "Don’t Smash The Qualifying Man"
12. "Hoist Up the Popular Ones"
13. "Starfighter #1479"
14. "Bitter (Did You Notice That?)"
15. "Rock and Roll Eyes"
16. "If I Had a Dartgun"
17. "Tied to the Trailer"
18. "My Supermodel Girlfriend Gone Awol"
19. "You’re Like Everyone"
20. "Take the Original Frame"
21. "Capture the Aimless Boy"
22. "Mandatory On the Attack"
23. "Good As Gold"

== Personnel ==
- Will Johnson – vocals, guitar, drums, bass guitar, and piano
- Matt Pence – engineering, mixing, mastering

== Reception ==
Malcolm Mayhew wrote in the Fort Worth Star-Telegram that the "intentionally grainy Redo the Stacks was recorded in, among other places, Johnson's bedroom, and while listening to it, you can't help but wonder if this is just Funland's old stuff playing on his stereo in the background, with the speakers filtered through a four-track". In his review for the Dallas Morning News, Thor Christensen wrote that the album is a "masterful fusion of pop and punk into bare-bones rock 'n' roll" and that "Johnson and his co-horts perform their songs with haphazard glee".
