= The Deathray Davies =

American indie rock band from Dallas, Texas

- Origin: Dallas, Texas, U.S.
- Genres: Indie rock, garage rock
- Years active: 1999–present
- Label: Idol Records/Glurp Records/State Fair Records
- Members: John Dufilho; Jason Garner; Mike Middleton; Andy Lester; Nick Earl; Kevin Ingle; Rich Martin; Dylan Silvers
- Past members: Robert Anderson; Chad Ferman; Bill Shupp; Matt Kellum; Peter Schmidt; Greg Price

The Deathray Davies are an indie rock band from Dallas, Texas. The band's name is a reference to Ray Davies, the lead vocalist of the Kinks.

== History ==
The band was formed as a solo side project for the Dallas musician John Dufilho, who sent in a demo tape to the 1999 SXSW performance. He recruited friends from other local Dallas bands in order to perform. Originally from San Antonio, Dufilho and Jason Garner played together in a band called Thirteen (with Chris Smart and Chris Brinkley) and together as a three-piece fuzz-pop band called Bedwetter (with Colin Jones from Big Drag). Dufilho and Garner also perform acoustically as I Love Math, which has included a number of other musicians.

The band has released six albums. In 2004, following the release of Midnight at the Black Nail Polish Factory, they were profiled in Esquire and People magazines. They have toured with Starlight Mints, the Breeders, the Old 97's, Pete Yorn, Centro-matic, Superdrag, and Dressy Bessy.

== Discography ==
- Drink With the Grownups and Listen to Jazz (2000)
- Return of the Drunk Ventriloquist (2001)
- Day of the Ray (2002)
- Midnight at the Black Nail Polish Factory (2003)
- The Kick and the Snare (2005)
- Time Well Wasted (2021)

== Band members ==
- John Dufilho - lead vocals, guitar, bass, drums, keys (1999–present)
- Jason Garner - bass, drums (1999–present)
- Kevin Ingle - tambo/shakers (1999–present)
- Mike Middleton - guitar (2001–present)
- Nick Earl - guitar (2014–present)
- Rich Martin - keys (2014–present)
