= True Widow =

Three-piece rock band from Dallas, Texas

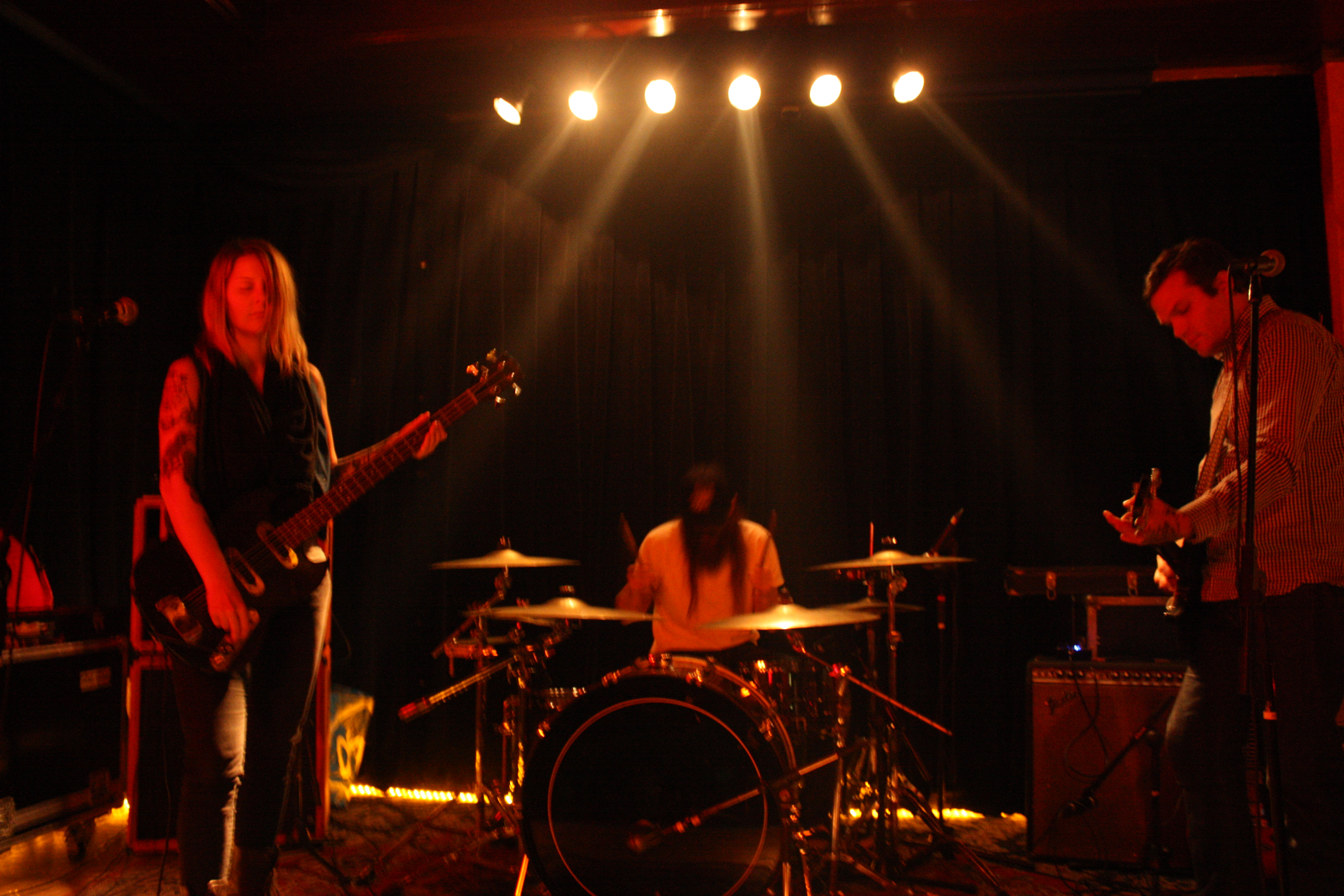
- True Widow performing live in Berlin in 2010. From left to right: Nicole Estill, Timothy Starks and Dan Phillips.

Background information
- Origin: Dallas, Texas, US
- Genres: Stoner rock, shoegazing, slowcore, post-rock, doom metal, occult rock
- Years active: 2007–present
- Labels: Kemado, Relapse, End Sounds
- Members: Dan "D.H." Phillips; Nicole Estill; Timothy "Slim" Starks

True Widow is an American rock band formed in 2007 and based in Dallas, Texas. The band's expansive guitar-driven sound has led them to be cited as "drop-tuned, slow, repetitive, heavy, dreamy, and undeniably ear-wormy". True Widow has been known for contrasting alternation between male and female vocals. To date, the band has released four albums, their eponymous album True Widow (2008), As High As the Highest Heavens and From the Center to the Circumference of the Earth (2011), Circumambulation (2013), and Avvolgere (2016).

== Biography ==
Phillips formerly served guitar and lead vocal duties in the more indie rock-oriented Dallas band Slowride. Following the disbandment of Slowride, he soon decided to take a break from music, and moved away from his native Texas to Massachusetts where he shifted his focus to wood art exclusively for two years. After returning to Dallas, Phillips aspired to a heavier sound and recruited Estill as a singer-bassist, with Starks on drums, and then they formed True Widow. The band, which describes its own style of slow, heavy, cerebral music as "stonegaze", or dubbed "doomgaze" by the media, formed in November 2007.

True Widow's self-titled debut album was released in 2008 on the Texas independent record label End Sounds.

They toured the US in early 2011 opening for Surfer Blood and ...And You Will Know Us by the Trail of Dead, and later in 2011 opening for Boris and Asobi Seksu.

On May 26, 2011, True Widow released their second record, titled As High As the Highest Heavens and From the Center to the Circumference of the Earth, via Kemado Records. BBC music critic Mike Diver wrote that "taking cues from grunge, slowcore, stoner-rock and shoegaze, the Texan trio have crafted a nine-track opus which is as exquisite of elegant detail as it is exemplary of skull-rumbling riff".

In May 2012, they toured with Kurt Vile.

True Widow's third album, Circumambulation, was released in July 2013 on Relapse Records, which signed the band in January 2013. It was recorded in November 2012 at the Echo Lab studio in Argyle, Texas, with record producer and sound engineer Matt Pence, who also produced their sophomore album.

On September 23, 2016, the group released their fourth album, Avvolgere, via Relapse Records, which was recorded by Matt Pence.

== Discography ==
=== Albums ===
- True Widow (End Sounds, 2008)
- As High As the Highest Heavens and From the Center to the Circumference of the Earth (Kemado, 2011)
- Circumambulation (Relapse, 2013)
- Avvolgere (Relapse, 2016)

=== EPs ===
- I.N.O. (12") (Kemado, 2011)
- Violitionist Sessions (Violitionist Sessions, 2011)

=== Singles ===
- "Skull Eyes" (promo CD) (Kemado, 2011)

=== Music videos ===
- "AKA" (2009) (filmed in Sweden)
- "Skull Eyes" (2011)
- "S:H:S" (2013)
- "Theurgist" (2016)
- "F. W. T. S: L. T. M." (2016)
