= Vanessa Peters =

American musician

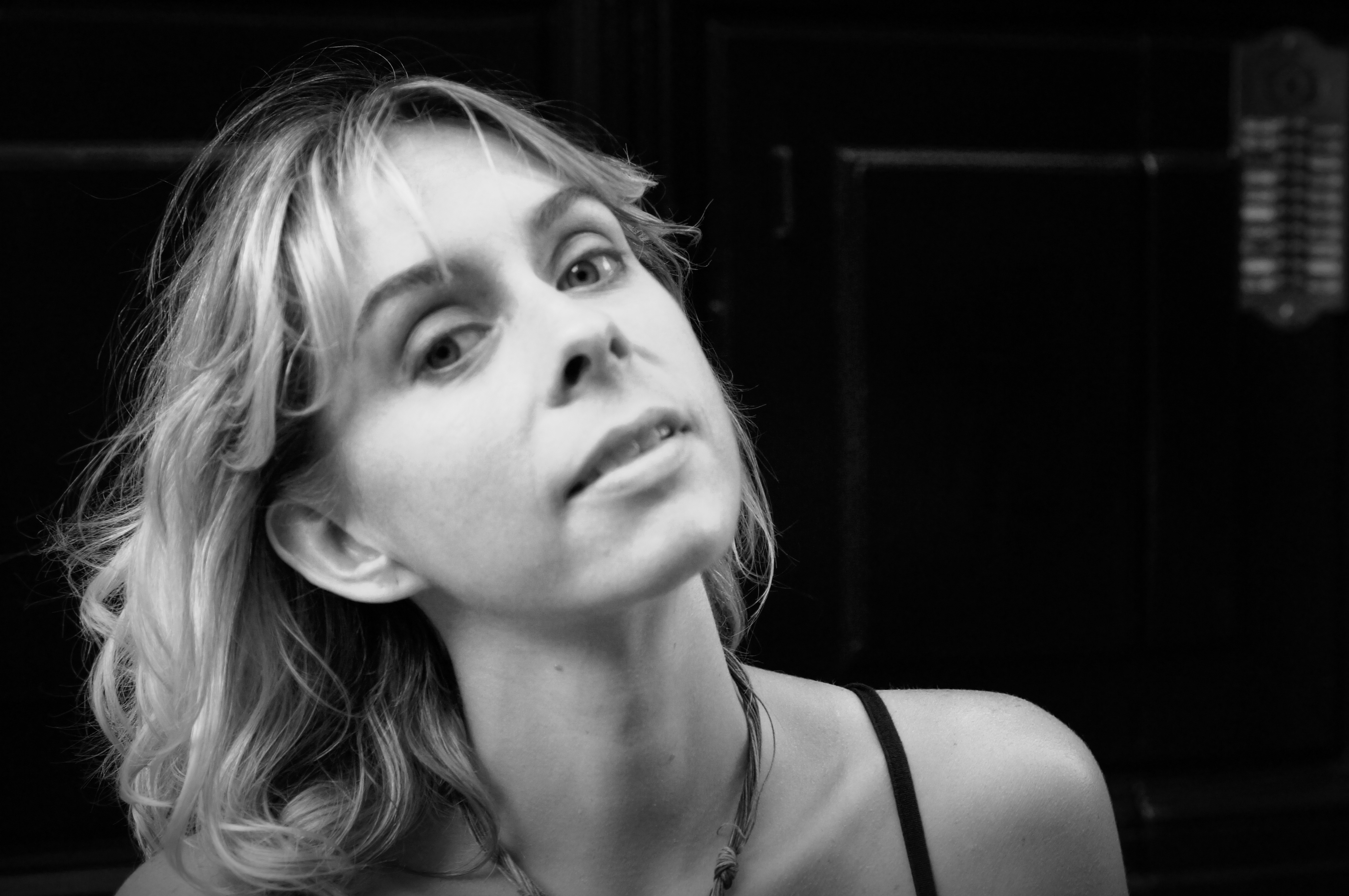

Background information
- Born: September 16, 1980 (age 45)
- Origin: Texas
- Genres: Folk rock; pop rock; indie
- Instruments: Vocals; guitar; harmonica
- Years active: 2002–present
- Label: Idol Records
- Website: http://www.vanessapeters.com

Vanessa Peters (born September 16, 1980) is an American singer and songwriter.

== Early life and education ==
Peters grew up in Dallas, Texas. She studied English and Creative Writing at Texas A&M University to pursue her original intent to obtain an MFA in Creative Writing and pursue a career as a novelist. Upon graduation, she moved to Castiglion Fiorentino, Italy for a year, where she learned to play guitar and began writing songs. She started playing music professionally in 2003.

== Career ==
=== 2003–2010 ===
In 2003, Peters released her first album, Sparkler. The following year she embarked on a solo cross-country tour. In January 2006, she recorded her first album with the band Ice Cream on Mondays, Thin Thread. The collaboration produced three albums and numerous tours across Europe and America in which Peters was usually accompanied by the band's lead guitarist, Manuel Schicchi.

Peters has also produced solo records over the years, including the acoustic EP Blackout. One of the tracks, "Afford to Pretend", was featured on NPR's All Songs Considered Open Mic in 2006. Peters’ songs "Love Story" and “The Next Big Bang” were featured on The Real World: New Orleans and Keeping Up with the Kardashians respectively.

Her last album recorded with Ice Cream on Mondays, Sweetheart, Keep Your Chin Up, received positive critical acclaim and debuted at #12 on The Euro Americana Chart. Peters and the band played on more than 100 dates in 2009 in support of the album, including shows at The Green Note in London and Folk Club in Torino, Italy. After a follow-up tour across Europe comprising 50 shows in early 2010, Vanessa and the band parted ways.

=== 2010–2021 ===
Peters released The Christmas We Hoped For, a holiday album featuring classics and an original composition, in 2011. The album finished on a number of top 10 holidays lists, including About.com Top 2011 Pop Holiday albums.

The following year Peters released The Burn The Truth The Lies, which was financed by a successful Kickstarter campaign. The album was recorded in Austin by Jim Vollentine (Spoon, Patty Griffin) and produced by Rip Rowan (Old 97's, Deathray Davies). It featured performances by Grammy Award-winning producer and guitarist Joe Reyes, as well as Apples in Stereo drummer John Dufilho and The Polyphonic Spree's Jason Garner.

On October 31, 2014, Peters gave a talk entitled "Music in the age of free" at a TEDx Stuttgart event, where she illustrated the struggle that independent musicians face earning a living by making and selling music in the digital age.

In 2015 Peters released With The Sentimentals, which was recorded live in Denmark with Scandinavian Americana band The Sentimentals.

Her next album, The Burden of Unshakeable Proof, was released on March 1, 2016. It was recorded by producer Rip Rowan at their home studio in Dallas. Later that year, it became the first of Peters' albums to be released on vinyl.

Peters's album Foxhole Prayers was released on CD and vinyl on October 5, 2018, to critical acclaim. It was produced by Rip Rowan and John Dufilho at Electrofonic in Dallas, Texas. Tracks were recorded between November 2017 and June 2018.

Peters released a collection of cover songs called Mixtape in April 2020. The songs were recorded over a four-year period and feature electric guitars by Dallas's Christopher Holt (Don Henley).

Peters's most recent album is Modern Age. It was recorded entirely with Peters' European touring band "The Electrofonics" which consists of Federico Ciancabilla (electric guitar), Andrea Colicchia (bass), Matteo Patrone (keyboards), and Rip Rowan (drums) while on tour in Europe in November 2019, and finished in Italy in March 2020. The album was released on April 23, 2021.

== Critical reception ==
Vanessa Peters's songs have been widely praised by reviewers and critics for their thoughtful lyrics. Jeremy Hallock, writing for The Dallas Morning News, described Peters as "A brilliant songwriter with a literary quality that makes her songs comparable to short stories, Vanessa Peters is Dallas' Aimee Mann."

== Ice Cream on Mondays ==
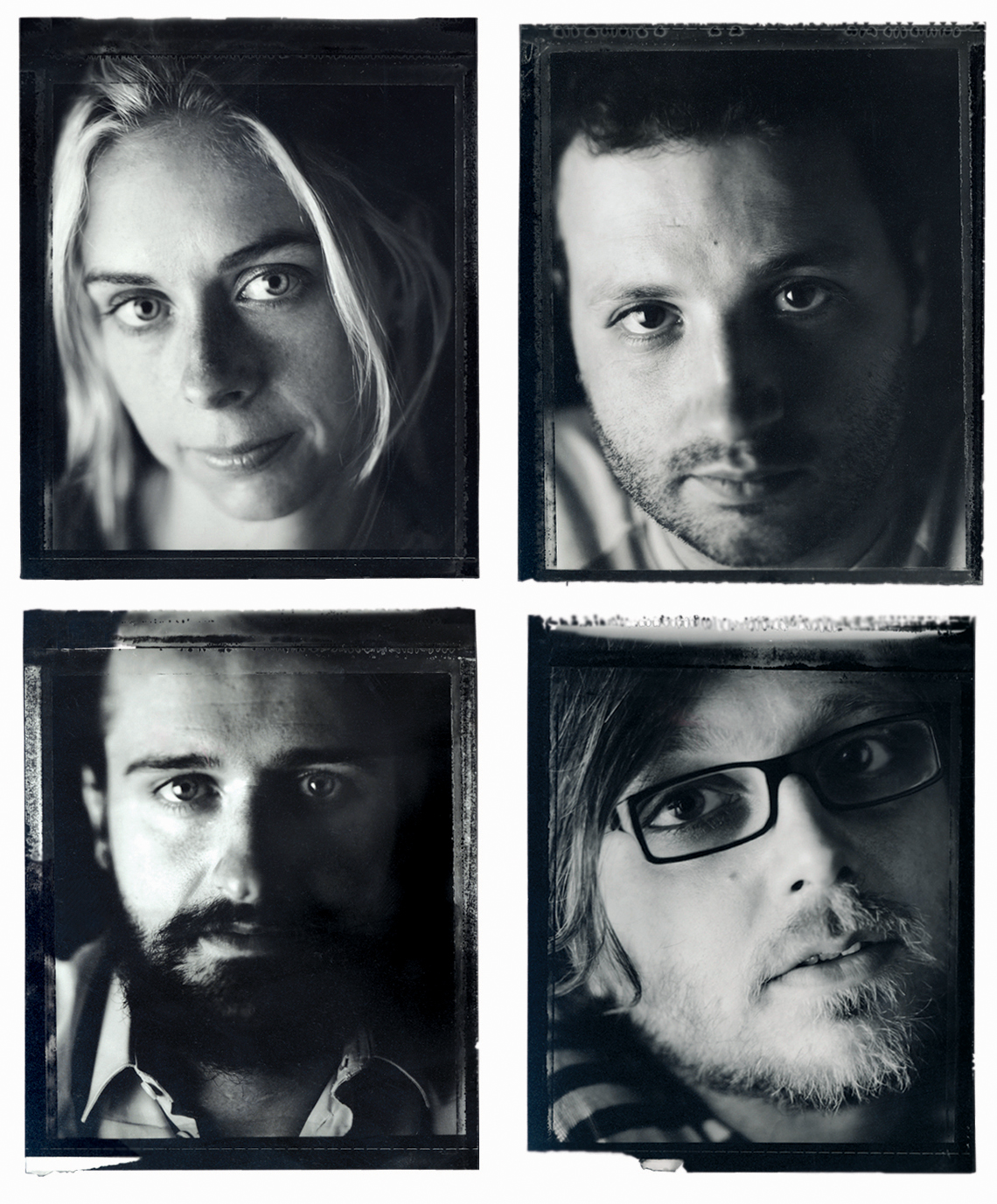
From top left to bottom right: Vanessa Peters, Juri Deluca, Alberto "Gumo" Serafini and Manuel Schicchi

=== Peters' discography with Ice Cream on Mondays ===
- Thin Thread (2005)
- Little Films (2006)
- Sweetheart, Keep Your Chin Up (2009)

=== Core band members ===
- Vanessa Peters: guitar and vocals
- Manuel Schicchi: lead guitar, harmony vocals, banjo, harmonica
- Juri Deluca: bass guitar
- Alberto "Gumo" Serafini: drums and percussion

=== Additional members of the touring formation ===
- Gabriele Galimberti: bass guitar
- Alex Akela: violin, mandolin, and bass guitar

== Solo discography ==
- Mirabilandia EP (2002)
- Sparkler (2003)
- Blackout EP (2006)
- The Christmas We Hoped For (2011)
- The Burn The Truth The Lies (2012)
- With The Sentimentals (2015)
- The Burden of Unshakeable Proof (2016)
- Foxhole Prayers (2018)
- Mixtape (2020)
- Modern Age (2021)
- Flying on Instruments (2024)
