= Dolly Varden (band) =

American alternative rock band

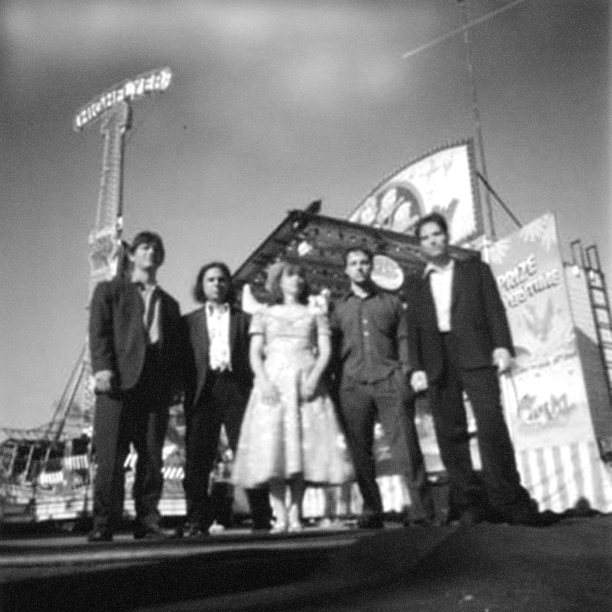

Background information
- Origin: Chicago, IL
- Genres: Indie, Alternative Rock
- Years active: 1993–present
- Labels: Undertow, Evil Teen, Flying Sparks, Fargo
- Spinoff of: Stump the Host
- Members: Steve Dawson, Diane Christiansen, Mark Balletto, Mike Bradburn, Matt Thobe
- Past members: Lisa Wertman Crowe
- Website: dollyvarden.com

Dolly Varden is a Chicago band built around the singing and songwriting of husband and wife duo Steve Dawson and Diane Christiansen. Their music combines elements of folk, rock and pop and country. The band has released 5 albums, along with several collections and side projects.

== Early Days ==
Christiansen and Dawson first came to prominence in Chicago with a twang-punk band, Stump the Host. The two founded Dolly Varden in 1993 when Stump The Host disbanded. They originally started as a quartet comprising Dawson, Christiansen, Lisa Wertman Crowe (bass) and Matt Thobe (drums). This lineup recorded a 4-song cassette EP with Brad Wood at Idful Music Corporation in Chicago. After a few months, Mark Balletto was added as an additional guitarist. This lineup recorded 3 more songs with Brian Deck and released them along with the Idful recordings as "Pet Me", a 6-song cassette. In 1994 the group recorded an EP with Doug McBride at Gravity studios in Chicago that has never been released. Lisa left the band in early 1995 and was replaced by Mike Bradburn, thus cementing the line-up that has remained unchanged to the present day (Feb 2011).

== Career ==
The band released their first album, Mouthful of Lies in 1995. It was recorded in Christiansen's art studio on a 4-track and released on their own Mid-Fi label. 'Mouthful of Lie's' was played regularly on WXRT-FM in Chicago and was named one of the best local albums of 1995 by DJ Richard Milne. The album was also noticed by a handful of national critics and led to the band being courted by several major labels. Dolly Varden signed on with manager Bob Andrews of Undertow Music at this time. Though RCA Records offered the group a 'demo' deal, which would have had the band record songs for RCA's staff to decide whether or not they wanted to release them, the band chose to sign with New York indie label Evil Teen for their second album, which was already in progress. The Thrill of Gravity (1998) was produced by Dolly Varden and recorded by Bundy K. Brown at Uberstudio in Chicago, and features guest appearances by David Grubbs (piano), and Julie Liu on violin. The band did their first national U.S. touring for 'Gravity', supporting Whiskeytown and Gov't Mule, and headlining shows in the Midwest and on the East Coast.

Dolly Varden's third album, The Dumbest Magnets (Evil Teen Records, 2000), was produced and recorded by Brad Jones (Chuck Prophet, Josh Rouse) at his Alex the Great Studio in Nashville, TN. (The Dumbest Magnets was licensed in 2001 for release in the UK on Flying Sparks Records and in Europe on Fargo Records). "Magnets" significantly raised the group's profile with rave reviews in Rolling Stone, The Village Voice, No Depression Magazine, Uncut, CMJ and many daily papers across the U.S. The band increased their touring schedule, adding dates in the U.K. and France throughout 2000 and 2001. Legendary BBC radio host Bob Harris was a big supporter of the album and the group in the U.K. For their fourth album, "Forgiven Now, released in March 2002 on the newly formed Undertow Records, the group once again recorded with Brad Jones in Nashville, TN. Pedal Steel legend Al Perkins (Rolling Stones, Gram Parsons) makes a guest appearance on the songs "There's A Magic" and "The Lotus Hour". 2002 was the group's busiest year of touring to date with shows from coast-to-coast in the U.S. (including an East Coast tour with Jay Bennett and Edward Burch) and 2 trips to the U.K.

== Hiatus ==
After writing, recording and touring together for over eight years, the group took a step back in 2003 to pursue side projects and raise families. Drummer Matt Thobe and bassist Mike Bradburn both became new fathers and chose to take time off from touring.

In 2003, Steve and Diane released an album together called Duets.

In 2004, guitarist Mark Balletto formed a band called My Record Player and made a self-titled pop rock album reminiscent of the music that originally inspired him to play guitar.

In 2005, Dawson recorded a solo album, Sweet Is The Anchor (Undertow Records), heavily influenced by early '70s soul and singer-songwriters.

== Return ==
The band released their fifth album, 2007's The Panic Bell (Undertow Records), to great reviews in the U.S. and the U.K. and toured the East Coast and the UK in the same year. In 2008 Dolly Varden celebrated the 13th anniversary of their debut album, "Mouthful of Lies", by releasing a limited-edition 2-CD set (disc 1: "The Best of Dolly Varden", Disc 2: "Rarities") and hosting a sold out show at Chicago's Old Town School of Folk Music with special guests Lisa Wertman Crowe, Robbie Fulks, Edward Burch and others. In 2009 and 2010 the group played sporadically in Chicago and St. Louis as Dawson focused on his second solo album, "I Will Miss The Trumpets and the Drums" and Christiansen focused on a large art installation project, "Notes To Nonself" with collaborator Shoshanna Utchenik. The band released its sixth studio album, For a While, in 2013. Steve Dawson has said that For a While is notable in that all the songs were written by him or with Diane and that this is the first album in which he has "followed my own songwriting advice."

== Members ==
- Steve Dawson - guitar, lead vocals
- Diane Christiansen - guitar, lead vocals
- Mark Balletto - guitar, vocals
- Mike Bradburn - bass
- Matt Thobe - drums

Past Members:

- Lisa Wertman Crowe - bass, vocals

== Discography ==
=== Early Demos ===
- Dolly Varden 1993 (cassette)
- Pet Me 1994 (cassette)
- Gravity Sessions 1994 (unreleased)

=== Dolly Varden ===
- Mouthful of Lies 1995 (Mid-Fi Records)
- The Thrill of Gravity 1998 (Evil Teen Records)
- The Dumbest Magnets 2000 (Evil Teen (US), Flying Sparks (UK), Fargo (Europe))
- Forgiven Now 2002 (Undertow)
- The Panic Bell 2007 (Undertow)
- 13 (2-CD compilation) 2008 (self-release)
- For a While 2013 (Mid-Fi)

=== Steve Dawson & Diane Christiansen ===
- Duets 2003 (Undertow)

=== My Record Player ===
- Come Around 2004 (MRP)

=== Steve Dawson ===
- Sweet Is The Anchor 2005 (Undertow)
- I Will Miss The Trumpets and the Drums 2010 (Undertow)
- At the Bottom of a Canyon in the Branches of a Tree 2021 (Pravda)

=== Steve Dawson & Funeral Bonsai Wedding ===
- Funeral Bonsai Wedding 2014
- Last Flight Out 2020

== Reception ==
- "The Chicago group Dolly Varden produces rootsy, atmospheric tunes laced with rock, country, and soul influences. (Their) well-crafted albums have garnered enthusiastic accolades from such vanguard publications of alt-country as the Austin Chronicle and No Depression." (Erik Hage, Allmusic)
- "Dolly Varden walks a line between steely country-rock with two-part harmonies to kill for and dreamy, shimmering, dark-edged pop." (Thom Jurek, Allmusic)
- "It's impossible to avoid the inevitable clichés, and dodge overused adjectives, such as "unbelievable," "excellent," "breathtaking," "unique," "vibrant," and worst of all, "refreshing," when describing this album because Dolly Varden is all of these and more. An alt-country band out of Chicago that vacillates between a Gram Parsons-early-Eagles sound, a Cowboy Junkies vibe, and something else totally original." (Michael B. Smith, Allmusic)
- "This band has been compared to artists like Lucinda Williams and Marshall Crenshaw for its deliberate blend of pop and alt country. It's rare that the words and music come together so perfectly, but that is the case with much of this record. "Your Last Mistake" is a comedown that seems to cement this album's high quality by an equally fine outfit. " (Jason MacNeil, Allmusic)
- "What does it sound like? Pretty rock music, made in Chicago. Like this melting pot of a city, Dolly Varden's music calls upon everything from power-pop and straight rock to alt-country and folk." (Kevin Williams, Chicago Tribune)
