= The Static vs. the Strings Vol. 1 =

Third album by Centro-Matic

Studio album by Centro-Matic
- Released: 1999
- Genre: Rock
- Label: Idol/Quality Park

Professional ratings
Review scores
Source	Rating
AllMusic	4/5 stars

The Static vs. the Strings Vol. 1 is the third full-length album by the American alternative country band Centro-Matic.

== Track listing ==
1. Calling Up the Bastards
2. Who's Telling You Now?
3. The Execution of Some Sixty-Odd Drummers
4. Neighbors. Habits. Downtown.
5. Recaptured the Silent Way
6. Repellant Feed
7. Turning Your Decisions
8. Wrecking This Show
9. D. Boon-Free (a Ninth Grade Crime)
10. Say Something / 95 Frowns
11. Curb Your Turbulence
12. Now That You Have Blown Away the Cards
13. You Might Need This Now
14. Keep the Phoenix in Slow Motion

== Personnel ==
- Will Johnson – vocals, guitars
- Scott Danbom – vocals, keyboards, violin
- Mark Hedman – bass
- Matt Pence – drums

== Reception ==
Heather Phares of AllMusic rated the album four out of five stars, saying the album was "almost as much fun to listen to as it must have been to make."
