= Molina and Johnson =

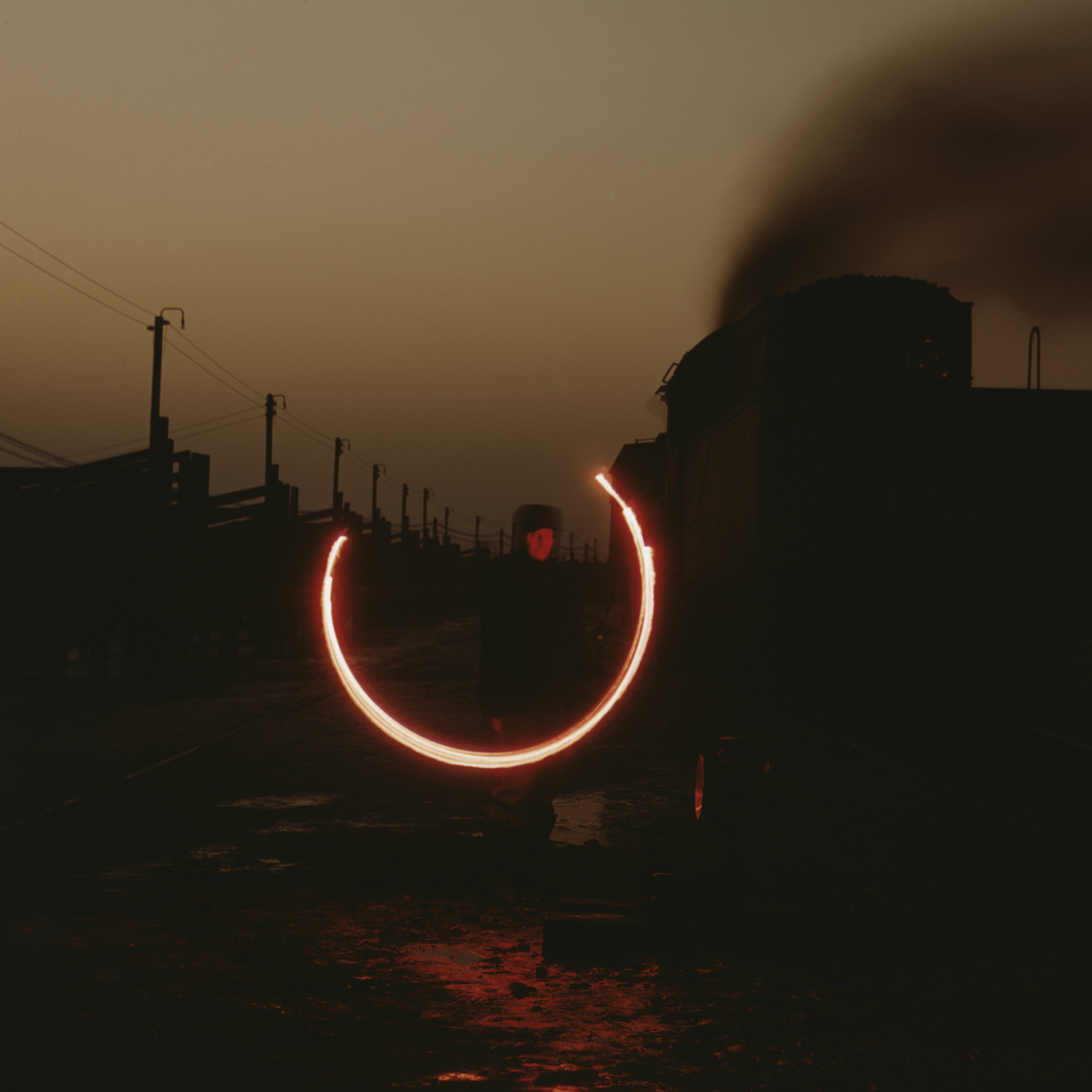

Studio album by Jason Molina and Will Johnson
- Released: 2 November 2009
- Recorded: February 2008
- Genre: Alternative country
- Label: Secretly Canadian

Molina and Johnson is a collaborative album recorded by American songwriters Jason Molina and Will Johnson. It was released on 2 November 2009 by Secretly Canadian.

The cover art for the album was taken from a photograph by Jack Delano for the Office of War Information: Indiana Harbor Belt RR, switchman demonstrating signal with a "fusee" - used at twilight and dawn - when visibility is poor. This signal means "stop." Calumet City, Ill. from 1943.

"All Gone, All Gone" features back-up vocals by Sarah Jaffe.

It received "generally favorable reviews" according to review aggregator Metacritic, with an aggregate score of 75 as of 25 November 2009. According to the Austin Chronicle reviewer, "this debut collaboration is a testament to just how deeply these two songwriters sympathize with each other's work, revealing a shared penchant for evocatively detailed images that blossom into visceral narratives." The Pitchfork Media reviewer was less sanguine: "The 14 tracks on Molina and Johnson comprise an especially slow drive through somber countryside, windows up and speed limit carefully maintained."

== Track listing ==
1. "Twenty Cycles to the Ground"
2. "All Falls Together"
3. "All Gone, All Gone"
4. "Almost Let You In"
5. "In the Avalon/Little Killer"
6. "Don't Take My Night From Me"
7. "Each Star Marks a Day"
8. "Lenore's Lullaby"
9. "The Lily and the Brakeman"
10. "Now, Divide"
11. "What You Reckon, What You Breathe"
12. "For as Long as It Will Matter"
13. "34 Blues"
14. "Wooden Heart"
