= Dual Hawks =

Studio album by Centro-Matic/South San Gabriel
- Released: April 7, 2008
- Genre: Rock
- Label: Misra; Cooking Vinyl; Houston Party

Professional ratings
Review scores
Source	Rating
AllMusic	3.5/5 stars
The A.V. Club	B
Pitchfork	6.9/10

Dual Hawks is an album by Centro-Matic and South San Gabriel. It consists of 23 tracks. Will Johnson is the principal songwriter for both bands.

== Track listing ==
Centro-matic / Dual Hawks

1. "The Rat Patrol and DJs"
2. "Two Seats Gold Reserved"
3. "Quality Strange"
4. "Remind Us Alive"
5. "Every Single Switch"
6. "I, The Kite"
7. "Strychnine, Breathless Ways"
8. "All Your Farewells"
9. "Counting The Scars"
10. "Twenty-Four"
11. "A Critical Display of Snakes"

South San Gabriel / Dual Hawks

1. "Emma Jane"
2. "Kept On The Sly"
3. "When The Angels Will Put Out Their Lights"
4. "Of Evil/For Evil"
5. "My Goodbyes"
6. "Senselessly"
7. "Corner Cross"
8. "Trust To Lose"
9. "The Arc And The Cusp"
10. "Alabama Crusade"
11. "Jornada Del Muerto #20"
12. "From This I Will Awake"

== Personnel ==
- Will Johnson - vocals, guitars
- Scott Danbom - vocals, keyboards, violin
- Mark Hedman - bass
- Matt Pence - drums
