= Love You Just the Same =

Studio album by Centro-Matic
- Released: September 2003
- Genre: Rock
- Label: Misra/Munich

Love You Just the Same is a 2003 rock album by Texan rock band Centro-Matic.

The album was rated 4 out of 5 stars by AllMusic.

== Track listing ==
1. Mighty Midshipman
2. Flashes and Cables
3. Argonne Limit Co.
4. Biology Tricks
5. Strahan Has Corralled the Freaks
6. All the Lightning Rods
7. Reset Anytime
8. Picking Up Too Fast
9. Spiraling Sideways
10. Supercar
11. Silver Plate Complaints
12. Breathe Deep Not Loud
13. Without You

== Personnel ==
- Will Johnson - vocals, guitars
- Scott Danbom - vocals, keyboards, violin
- Mark Hedman - bass
- Matt Pence - drums
