= Undertow Music =

American independent artists' collective

- Founded: 1996
- Founder: Mark Ray, Bob Andrews
- Country of origin: United States
- Location: Champaign, Illinois
- Official website: www.undertowmusic.com

Undertow began in 1996 in St. Louis, Missouri, as a collective of independent artists, musicians, filmmakers, designers and creative managers sharing resources, ideas, and a love of music. Undertow Music is currently located in Champaign, Illinois.

== Record label ==
Undertow Records was started in 1996 by Mark Ray when he released albums by his band, Waterloo, and a band they shared a studio space with, Nadine. Undertow serves as a conduit for artists to release their albums to a wider audience through digital, retail, and direct sales outlets. The artists retain ownership and control of their music at all times. No formal contracts are drawn up between artists and Undertow.

Undertow has released records for artists such as Jay Bennett (of Wilco fame), Will Johnson (of Centro-Matic), The Amazing Pilots, Artificial Hearts, The Redwalls, The Cush, Nadine, Magnolia Summer, Glossary, Dreadful Yawns, Waterloo, Anna Fermin, Steve Dawson, Dolly Varden, J. Tillman, South San Gabriel, Centro-matic, Via Audio.

== Artist management ==
Undertow Artist Management was started by Bob Andrews in 1996 after he joined forces with Mark Ray's record label for the release of Nadine's debut album. The original roster was Nadine, Centro-matic, and Dolly Varden. Andrews split his time between the label and management until 2002 when he started focusing solely on artist management while expanding the roster to include Pedro the Lion, Grammy Award winner Jesse Harris and American Music Club.

The management roster expanded and new managers joined the collective in 2004, 2006 and 2008.

Undertow's current management roster includes:

- The Bottle Rockets
- Bad Bad Hats
- David Bazan
- Headphones
- The Mynabirds
- Overseas
- Pedro the Lion
- Will Johnson

== Undertow store ==
Undertow was one of the first independent labels to have an e-commerce store selling CDs and shirts with all profits going back to the artists. The Undertow Store started as a single webpage store front in 1998 selling a small selection of CDs and shirts, but has since grown.

== Undertow tickets ==
Undertow expanded again in 2009 to offer direct-to-fan ticketing when David Bazan ventured out on a nationwide tour playing in fans' living rooms. They have since handled ticketing for similar tours by Rocky Votolato, Will Johnson, Rosie Thomas, Joan of Arc, Eric Bachmann, Clap Your Hands Say Yeah, Mike Doughty, Vandaveer, Julia Nunes, Lady Lamb, Mirah, Eef Barzelay, Chris Staples, Damien Jurado, Owen, Sarah Jaffe, and The Bottle Rockets.

== The Undertow Orchestra ==
In 2006, a group of Undertow artists toured the US and Europe, billed as The Undertow Orchestra. Members of the touring group included David Bazan (of Pedro the Lion and Headphones), Mark Eitzel (of American Music Club), Will Johnson and Scott Danbom (of Centro-Matic), and Vic Chesnutt.
