= Stump the Host =

US musical group

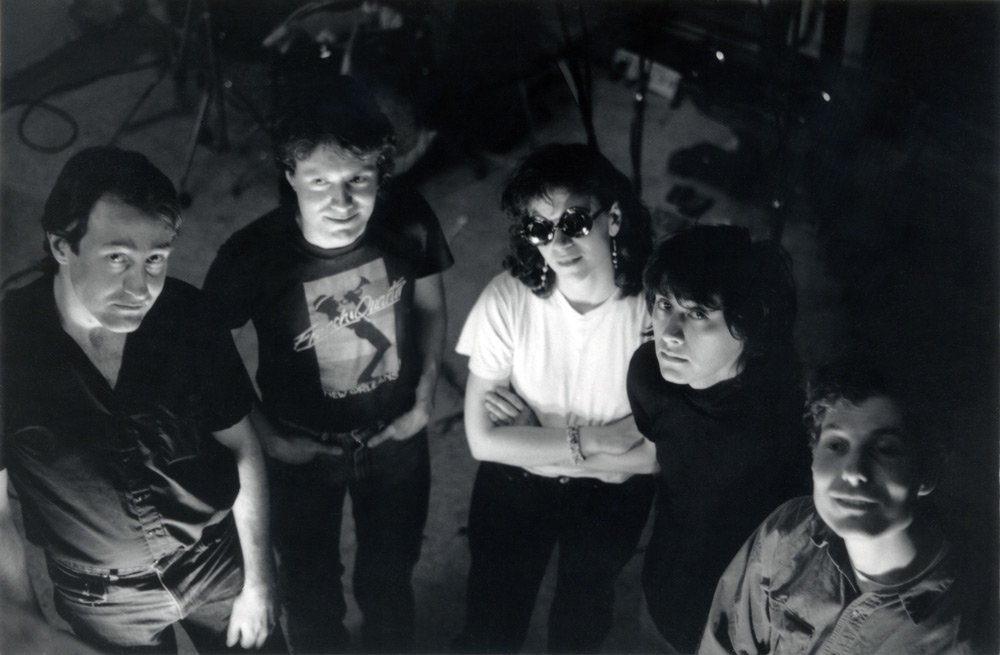
- (L-R) Dave Gay, Brian Dunn, Diane Christiansen, Leslie Santos, Steve Dawson

Background information
- Origin: Chicago, IL
- Genre: alt country
- Years active: 1988–1993
- Label: Minty Fresh
- Members: Stephen Dawson, Diane Christiansen, Brian Dunn, Dave Gay, Leslie Santos, Davyd Johnson, Dan Massey, Tom Murray

Stump the Host was a band from Chicago, United States, featuring lead singers Steve Dawson and Diane Christiansen, who later formed the band Dolly Varden. From 1988 to 1993, they played primarily in Chicago and the Midwest. Their music was a mix of country, rock, and R&B, featuring dual male/female harmony vocals, country-blues electric guitar, saxophone and rhythm section. After a series of local and national reviews of their cassette recordings, and a performance at South By Southwest, they signed a publishing deal with PolyGram Music and were courted by Zoo Records. They eventually released one 7" single, "California Zephyr", on the independent label Minty Fresh.

== Career ==
The band began in 1988 as an acoustic trio with Steve Dawson on guitar and vocals, Tom Murray on violin, and Diane Christiansen on vocals. By 1989, they added Dave Gay on upright bass and Leslie Santos on drums and had begun playing larger venues in Chicago. Brian Dunn was added on electric guitar and Murray left in late 1989 as the band recorded its first cassette release with Timothy Powell in Chicago. In 1990, Davyd Johnson was added on tenor saxophone, and the band recorded its second cassette release, which was given a spotlight review in CMJ.

In 1991, the band signed a publishing deal with Polygram/Island Music, and was also a finalist in Musician magazine's Best Unsigned Bands Contest.

In 1991, the band caught the ear of Jim Powers, an A+R rep for Zoo Records. Zoo paid for the band to demo four songs, "Married in a Taxi Cab," "10,000 Pounds," "Bronko Nagurski," and "Pink to Black", with producer Steve Berlin (of Los Lobos) and engineer Jim Rondinelli. The company did respond with an offer, but neither Powers nor the band were happy with it and they passed. In 1993, Powers set up his own independent record label, called Minty Fresh, through which he released Stump the Host's only single.

The stress of the music business contributed to the band's breakup in 1993. Another factor was that some members of the band wanted to begin touring more actively while others did not.

Drummer Leslie Santos left the group in 1992, eventually joining the Long Gone Lonesome Boys, and was replaced by Dan Massey of the group the Wildroots. Dave Gay, the bass player, also eventually decided to leave the band, and went on to play full-time with Freakwater, who he'd been a member of from the beginning. A replacement was found in Lisa Wertman, formerly of the band Get Smart!, but before Lisa got started with the band, they broke up. Lisa would continue to play with Steve and Diane, though, as a founding member of Dolly Varden. Stump the Host played its last show on Saturday, June 11, 1993, at the Beat Kitchen in Chicago.

== Discography ==
"California Zephyr" / "World's Greatest Liar" (1993, Minty Fresh, MF1021693)

== Reception ==
- "When you turn over the traditional rock of country music, you unearth a colony of cherished influences. A sense of fair play binds modern country melodies with rugged Southern gospel and the bottleneck guitar of rural blues. That's how Stump the Host plays the game." (Dave Hoekstra, Chicago Tribune, September 27, 1989)
- "Here, goodness gracious, is one Chicago rock band that has it all: excellent original songs, two appealing and emotionally credible singers, a guitarist playing memorable licks, a rock-solid rhythm section--and yes, a name that people remember. Stump the Host play rock 'n' roll that's been soaked overnight in a big bucket o' country feeling and hung up to dry in the gritty air of the big city. " (Renaldo Migaldi, Chicago Reader, February 8, 1990)
- "In concert, Stump the Host is capable of transcendent power, especially when Dawson and Diane Christiansen blend their voices on one of their original songs. Brian Dunn is an astonishing guitarist, one of the best I've seen in Chicago, and the rhythm section of Dave Gay and Leslie Santos smolders like one of Gay's omnipresent cigarettes." (Greg Kot, Chicago Tribune, May 10, 1990)
- "With Dawson`s and Christiansen`s voices intertwining in the foreground, the band plays a country rock tinged with gospel, blues and rhythm & blues." (band Profile, Chicago Tribune, September 21, 1990)
- "Stump the Host will perform its soul and western musical stylings. One of the best new bands to emerge in the late '80s, Stump the Host is homegrown. The musicians' harmonizing is beautiful and makes their lyrical songs sound uncommonly good." (Jae-Ha Kim, Chicago Sun-Times, March 15, 1991)
- "Strong vocals, performances on locally circulated tapes; Dawson's songwriting skills could provide fluke break. " (Bill Wyman, Chicago Reader, July 1, 1993)
- "Stump the Host adhered to a rustic yet rocking songcraft that was peerless in Chicago." (Rick Reger, Chicago Tribune, December 22, 1995)
- "I still have vivid memories of Steve Dawson onstage one night at the Lounge Ax with his first band, Stump the Host. Killing time while some guitar strings got changed, he sang an impromptu version of "(You Make Me Feel Like) a Natural Woman"--lost in the tune, his eyes closed, he made the gender flip irrelevant. Dawson understood that soul singing isn't about bombast and flash but careful shading and deep intuition." (Peter Margasak, Chicago Reader, August 25, 2005)

== Members ==
- Steve Dawson - guitar, vocals
- Diane Christiansen - vocals
- Brian Dunn - lead guitar
- Dave Gay - bass (standup and electric)
- Leslie Santos - drums #1
- Dan Massey - drums #2
- Davyd Johnson - saxophone
- Tom Murray - violin
