= Forgiven Now =

Studio album by Dolly Varden
- Released: 2002
- Genre: Alt-Country
- Label: Undertow
- Producer: Brad Jones

Dolly Varden chronology
The Dumbest Magnets (2000)	Forgiven Now (2002)	The Panic Bell (2007)

Forgiven Now is the fourth studio album by Chicago based alt-country band Dolly Varden and was released in 2002. Like the previous release, The Dumbest Magnets, this album was recorded in Nashville with producer Brad Jones.

== Track listing ==
1. Surrounded By The Sound
2. Trying To Live Up
3. Forgiven Now
4. The Lotus Hour
5. Overwhelming
6. Wish I Were Here
7. There's A Magic
8. Time For Me To Leave
9. Disappear
10. 1000 Men Like Cigarettes
11. Meant To Be

== Personnel ==
- Steve Dawson - lead vocals, guitar
- Diane Christiansen - lead vocals, guitar
- Mark Balletto - guitar, backing vocals
- Mike Bradburn - bass, backing vocals
- Matt Thobe - drums, percussion, backing vocals

== Reception ==
- "With its fourth album, Chicago's Dolly Varden has taken the formidable strengths of each recording and combined them in a seamless, breathtaking collection of rock and pop songs that embrace country music's gloriously complex heart without calling into play any of its cultural clichés" (Thom Jurek, Allmusic.com)
- "A hypnotic set of songs about resentment and anger, and the importance of leaving both behind." (Alanna Nash, Amazon.com)
- "This is a gem of an album that features strong songwriting that really captures moods and emotions; a rare and genuine treat that should hold up well in years to come." (Gary Glauber, PopMatters)
- "For the past seven years, Dolly Varden has been making beautifully crafted, country-accented pop-rock that's reached a new high water mark with its latest CD, "Forgiven Now." Filled with thoughtful lyrics and gorgeous, hard-to-shake melodies, it's a richly rewarding record from a group that's aging like fine wine." (Rick Reger, Chicago Tribune)
- "Dolly Varden has always matched the roots-rock soul and animated camaraderie of The Band and the Jayhawks. And now with its fourth album, "Forgiven Now" (Undertow Records), the Chicago five has forged its quieter side." (Mark Guarino, Daily Herald)
- "The hooks and melodies of Forgiven Now are the perfect foil for the wry, sardonic insight of the lyrics." (Eric Fidler, Associated Press)
- "The group’s latest release is a stunning jewel that aligns hooky pop tunes alongside others peppered with a charming country-flavor." (Jim DeRogatis, Chicago Sun-Times)
- "Forgiven Now is at times hard-bitten and gritty and at others shimmery and ethereal" (Monica Kendrick, Chicago Reader)
- "Dolly Varden is a gem of a band. On Forgiven Now, their fourth record, the Chicago quintet continues to refine their appealing blend of pop and country." (Jim Desmond, No Depression)
