= South San Gabriel Songs/Music =

Studio album by South San Gabriel
- Released: September 2000
- Genre: Rock
- Label: Idol/Munich

Professional ratings
Review scores
Source	Rating
Allmusic	4.5/5 stars

The first South San Gabriel album, South San Gabriel Songs/Music, was released under the nom de plume Centro-Matic. The band later decided to keep the straightforward rock songs for Centro-Matic and release the quieter songs as South San Gabriel. However, there's already no reference to Centro-Matic on the Munich Records (The Netherlands) release of Songs/Music.

== Track listing ==
1. Ninety Secretaries Down
2. Proud Son Of Gaffney
3. To Accompany
4. The Fireworks Treatment
5. With Broken Hands
6. The Ensuing Light Of Day
7. One-hundred Thousand Bridesmaids
8. Glacial Slurs
9. Innocence Kindly Waits
10. Destroyer

== Personnel ==
- Will Johnson - vocals, guitars
- Scott Danbom - vocals, keyboards, violin
- Mark Hedman - bass
- Matt Pence - drums
