= Monsters of Folk =

American band

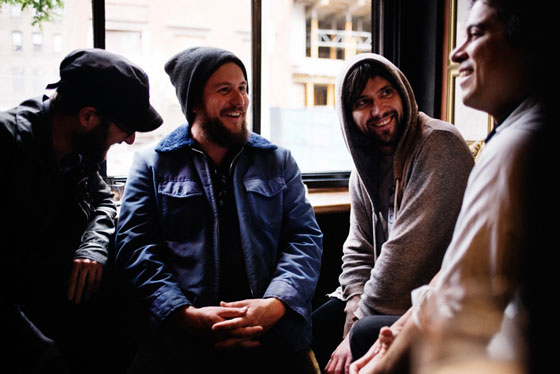
- Monsters of Folk

Background information
- Origin: United States
- Genres: Folk, folk rock, indie folk
- Years active: 2004–2010
- Labels: Rough Trade; Shangri-La Music
- Past members: Jim James; Mike Mogis; Conor Oberst; M. Ward; Will Johnson
- Website: Official website

Monsters of Folk was an American supergroup, consisting of Jim James from My Morning Jacket; Conor Oberst and Mike Mogis from Bright Eyes; and M. Ward, solo artist and half of She & Him. Will Johnson, solo artist and member of Centro-matic, played drums for the group during live performances, and, during their appearance on Austin City Limits, James called him "the fifth Monster". Ward stated in 2012 that their 2009 debut studio album is "definitely not a one-time thing", and was followed up by bonus material for the reissue by ATO Records in 2024.

The group was formed in 2004, when the members were on tour with their respective bands and solo projects. After playing together both on-stage and backstage, they started working on various material, but, due to the members' main projects, Monsters of Folk did not produce an album until 2009. They recorded the self-titled effort in Omaha, Nebraska, and Malibu, California, and embarked on a tour to support it.

Released on September 22, 2009, on Rough Trade Records, Monsters of Folk debuted at No. 143 on the Billboard 200 and peaked at No. 15. It reached No. 3 on the Top Independent Albums chart, No. 8 on the Top Rock Albums chart, No. 7 on the Top Digital Albums chart, and No. 6 on the Top Alternative Albums chart.

On October 23 and 24, 2009, the group performed at Neil Young's 23rd annual Bridge School Benefit held in Mountain View, California, at the Shoreline Amphitheater.

The song "Baby Boomer" was chosen as the Starbucks iTunes Pick of the Week for October 27, 2009.

"His Master's Voice" is featured on the soundtrack of the film Three Billboards Outside Ebbing, Missouri. Other appearances in media include "Map of the World", which is featured in an episode of the CW teen drama Gossip Girl.

== Discography ==
=== Album ===
Monsters of Folk albums
Title	Details	Peak chart positions						
Title	Details	US	US Alt	US Folk	US Heat	US Indie	US Rock	AUS
Monsters of Folk	Release date: September 22, 2009; Label: Rough Trade Records; Formats: CD, music download	15	6	3	1	3	8	91

=== Singles ===
Monsters of Folk singles
Year	Single	Album
2009	"Say Please"	Monsters of Folk
2010	"Dear God (Sincerely M.O.F.)"	Monsters of Folk

== Band members ==
- Jim James – vocals, guitar, bass, drums, percussion, keyboards
- Mike Mogis – guitar, keyboards, backing vocals, pedal steel, mandolin, dobro, bass, drums, percussion
- Conor Oberst – vocals, guitar, bass, drums, percussion, keyboards, piano
- M. Ward – vocals, guitar, bass, piano

Touring

- Will Johnson – drums, backing vocals

== See also ==
- New Multitudes
