= The Carlton Chronicles: Not Until the Operation's Through =

The Carlton Chronicles: Not Until The Operation's Through

Studio album by South San Gabriel
- Released: April 5, 2005
- Genre: Rock
- Label: Misra/Munich/Houston Party

Professional ratings
Review scores
Source	Rating
Allmusic	4/5 stars

The Carlton Chronicles: Not Until the Operation's Through is an album released by South San Gabriel in 2005.

The album's songs are written from the perspective of a cat named Carlton. It was recorded in Argyle, Texas over a three-week period.

Allmusic writer John Schacht gave it a four-star reviewing, calling it "an exquisite foray into wistfulness so sublime you can't help but feel elation mingled with the sadness". Exclaim!'s Chris Wibbs called it "a voyage well worth taking, despite the oddity of it being about a cat".

== Track listing ==
1. "Charred Resentment the Same"
2. "Predatory King Today"
3. "Affection’s the Pay"
4. "Dark of Garage"
5. "I Am Six Pounds of Dynamite"
6. "This Rookie Runs"
7. "I Feel Too Young to Die"
8. "Stupid Is as Stupid Does"
9. "Sicknessing"

== Personnel ==
- Will Johnson - vocals, guitars
- Scott Danbom - vocals, keyboards, violin
- Mark Hedman - bass
- Matt Pence - drums
