= The Dumbest Magnets =

Studio album by Dolly Varden
- Released: 2000
- Genre: Alt-Country
- Label: Evil Teen
- Producer: Brad Jones

Dolly Varden chronology
The Thrill of Gravity (1998)	The Dumbest Magnets (2000)	Forgiven Now (2002)

The Dumbest Magnets is the third studio album by Chicago based alt-country band Dolly Varden and was released in 2000. This album was recorded in Nashville with producer Brad Jones.

== Reception ==
- "The Dumbest Magnets blurs the lines between alt-country and pop the way the Jayhawks do on "Smile," only Dolly Varden does it better. Thoughtful lyrics, soaring melodies and killer hooks make Magnets giddily addictive, and as good as any album heard this year" (Eric Fidler, Associated Press)
- "the album is an elegant and soothing extension of the band's sumptuous 1998 effort, The Thrill of Gravity. The arrangements are more sweeping, the lyrics more refined, and the husband-and-wife vocal harmonies of Stephen Dawson and Diane Christiansen more dramatic than before" (Michael Bertin, The Austin Chronicle)
- "The Dumbest Magnets echoes the rustic simplicity of The Band's "Music from Big Pink", plumbs some of the moral depths of Bob Dylan's "John Wesley Harding" and embraces the art-song aesthetic of Joni Mitchell, Leonard Cohen and the mid-'70s Neil Young, without quite sounding like any of them." (Greg Kot, Chicago Tribune)
- "Put simply, Dolly Varden's third album is an understated American beauty. Musical lucidity is this Chicago fivesome's strength, after all. The Dumbest Magnets (Evil Teen) shimmers with supple, sophisticated soul." (Mark Guarino, Daily Herald)
- The Dumbest Magnets is simply aglow with a rare melodic grandness. Its songs perform the amazing feat of not only hooking you at first listen but retaining their appeal after the 10th or 20th." (Fred Mills, Phoenix New Times)
- "It's impossible to avoid the inevitable clichés, and dodge overused adjectives, such as "unbelievable," "excellent," "breathtaking," "unique," "vibrant," and worst of all, "refreshing," when describing this album because Dolly Varden is all of these and more. " (Michael B. Smith, Allmusic)

== Track listing ==
1. Apple Doll
2. The Thing You Love Is Killing You
3. The Dumbest Magnets
4. Second Chance
5. Progress Note
6. I Come To You
7. Balcony
8. Be A Part
9. Along For The Ride
10. Too Good To Believe
11. Some Sequined Angel
12. Simple Pleasure

== Personnel ==
- Steve Dawson - lead vocals, guitar
- Diane Christiansen - lead vocals, guitar
- Mark Balletto - guitar, backing vocals
- Mike Bradburn - bass, backing vocals
- Matt Thobe - drums, percussion, backing vocals
