= The Panic Bell =

Studio album by Dolly Varden
- Released: February 2007
- Genre: Alt-Country
- Length: 42:40
- Label: Undertow

Dolly Varden chronology
Forgiven Now (2002)	The Panic Bell (2007)	For a While (2013)

The Panic Bell is the fifth studio album by Chicago based alt-country band Dolly Varden. Released in February 2007 it was their first album since Forgiven Now in 2002. The album was recorded over a period of about a year after the band had taken a long hiatus from playing together. It includes songs influenced by the continuing violence in Iraq and the prisoner abuse scandals at Abu Ghraib, which led to some of the band's rawest recordings.

== Track listing ==
1. Complete Resistance
2. Everything
3. Small Pockets
4. All Gonna Change
5. The Truth Is Told
6. You Never Will
7. Sad Panda Clown's Lament
8. Triumph Mine, Idaho
9. Your Last Mistake
10. Good Provider

== Personnel ==
- Steve Dawson - lead vocals, guitar, piano, lap steel guitar
- Diane Christiansen - lead vocals
- Mark Balletto - guitar, lap steel guitar, backing vocals
- Mike Bradburn - bass, backing vocals
- Matt Thobe - drums, percussion, backing vocals

== Reception ==
- No Depression senior editor Don McLeese described the album as being "steeped in the influence of 1960s rock classicism in general and the Beatles in particular." in a review for Amazon.com
- "This album is still more alt-country than power-pop and has lots of rustic touches. Dawson must have brushed up on his Byrds and Beach Boys, yielding songs with cheerfully chiming guitars and airy, layered harmonies. " (Mark Jenkins, Washington Post)
- "The Panic Bell maintains much of what makes Dolly Varden the band that it is but also is purposely rough around the edges." (Kyle Koster, Chicago Sun-Times)
- "There's an everyman quality to Dolly Varden's mature pop music. The melodies and singing might seem a little plain at first, like songs that anyone could imagine singing themselves, but they're filled with subtle touches that keep you coming back for more listens." (Lincolnshire Review)
- "This band has been compared to artists like Lucinda Williams and Marshall Crenshaw for its deliberate blend of pop and alt country." (Jason MacNeil, Allmusic.com)
