= For a While (album) =

For A While

Studio album by Dolly Varden
- Released: January 21, 2013
- Genre: Alt-Country
- Label: Mid-Fi

Dolly Varden chronology
The Panic Bell (2007)	For A While (2013)

For A While is the sixth studio album by Chicago based alt-country band Dolly Varden and their first album since the 2007 The Panic Bell release. The official release date for the album was January 21, 2013 but pre-release copies were made available as early as October 2012.

Steve Dawson took over all the song writing duties for this album and the songs have been described as some of his most accessible, autobiographical and cohesive. Dawson himself described the album as the "most contented thematically", citing agitation and frustration in some of the previous Dolly Varden albums, and as having themes of "mortality, retrospection and gratitude."

== Track listing ==
1. Del Mar, 1976
2. For A While
3. Done (Done)
4. Girl In A Well
5. Walking The Chalkline Again
6. Mayfly
7. The Milkshake Incident, Part 1
8. Temperamental Complement
9. Saskatchewan To Chicago
10. Why Why Why
11. Favorite Friend
12. Thank You

== Personnel ==
- Steve Dawson - guitar, lead vocals
- Diane Christiansen - guitar, lead vocals
- Mark Balletto - guitar, vocals
- Mike Bradburn - bass
- Matt Thobe - drums

== Reception ==
- "It's been more than a half-decade since its last album (and 18 years since its very first), but the Windy City-area roots-rock band has a strong foundation in its husband-and-wife leaders and its devotion to sturdy writing and playing." (Jon M. Gilbertson, Milwaukee Journal Sentinel)
- "To me, they constitute the fabric of what continues to make Chicago vibrant, and I don't just mean in its arts community" (Richard Milne, WXRT)
- "There are big, up-tempo alt-country tunes... any of which could fit easily into radio's new fascination with folk song structure and vocal harmonies. (Think The Lumineers or The Head and the Heart.)" (Steve Johnson, Chicago Tribune)
- "'For a While' sounds like a band of musicians utterly comfortable in their own skins. The songwriting of Steve Dawson and wife Diane Christiansen is built on carefree melodies and sweet-but-never-cloying harmonies, making its creation seem deceptively easy. The thoughtful, reminiscent verses transmit a modest wisdom. The woody, moseying arrangements show off occasional experimental flourishes - the kind a grown-up musician tries out, not the brash theatricality of a grand-standing whipper-snapper." (Thomas Conner, Chicago Sun-Times)
- "For A While is quite often stark and keenly observational, looking at people and situations as they are." (Jim Desmond, "When You Motor Away")
