= Shangri-La Music =

American record label

Shangri-La Music was an independent record label based in Santa Monica, California. The label was founded by Steve Bing alongside co-founders Jeff Ayeroff and Jon Rubin, who ran the label. Shangri-La Music was a "boutique" label, a smaller, more specialized label offering 360 deals. 360 deals allow the label to share in bands' touring, merchandise, and digital branding rights profits instead of profiting from music sales alone.

== Artists ==
- Amazing Baby
- The Duke Spirit
- Monsters Of Folk
- One Eskimo
- The Pretenders
- Stacy Clark
