= River fork =

Place where a river visually "splits"

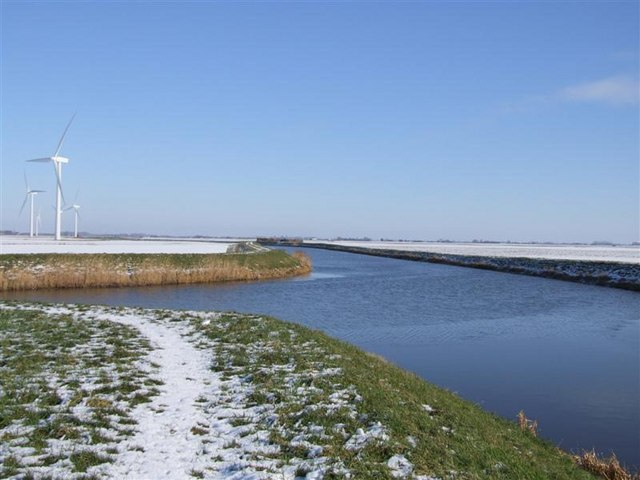
River Fork at Creek Fen, UK

A river fork is where a river is connected to two or more clearly and equally distinct branches. It describes both tributaries and distributaries.

A typical river fork is usually two tributaries merging (a confluence), such as the Nile proper created at that of the Blue Nile and White Nile, though the term can be used when a single or main channel of a river bifurcates into distributaries, a large instance being the Mississippi at the upper end of the Atchafalaya River.

Most river deltas fork several times, occasionally forming multiple clustered, elongated islands.

== See also ==
- River morphology
  - Tributary
  - River delta
  - Braided river - a braiding describes its multiple forks
