= South San Gabriel (band) =

American alternative country band

- Origin: Denton, Texas, US
- Genres: Alternative country
- Years active: 2000–2010, 2017
- Labels: Munich, Misra
- Members: Will Johnson

South San Gabriel is an American alternative country band based in Denton, Texas.

== History ==
The band is named after the San Gabriel river fork north of Austin, Texas. The group consists of the same players from Centro-Matic with the inclusion of guests, but focuses on more introspective and subdued offerings from their repertoire. Lead singer Will Johnson, has alternated between the two projects, while also releasing solo albums.

The first South San Gabriel album, Songs/Music, was credited to Centro-Matic on its US release (it was credited to South San Gabriel on the Netherlands release on Munich Records).

South San Gabriel released Welcome, Convalescence and The Carlton Chronicles – Not Until the Operation's Through in 2003 and 2005, respectively.

In 2008 the band released Dual Hawks a split double-album with Centro-matic.

== Discography ==
Studio albums

- Songs/Music (Munich, 2000) [Netherlands; credited to Centro-Matic on U.S. release]
- Welcome, Convalescence (Munich, 2003) [Netherlands]
- The Carlton Chronicles – Not Until the Operation's Through (Misra, 2005)
- Dual Hawks split double album with Centro-Matic (Misra, 2008)

Singles and EPs

- "Stark Miami Mines" split 7-inch with Okkervil River (Tight Spot, 2002)
- I Am Six Pounds of Dynamite + 3 (Munich, 2005)
- Eyas split EP with Centro-Matic (2010) [digital-only release on Amazon and iTunes]

Compilation appearances

- "Evangeline" on Awesome (Munich, 2001) [compilation also features Centro-Matic]
- "One Hundred Thousand Bridesmaids" on Esto No Es Un Cactus (Sinedin, 2001) [Spain; compilation also features Centro-Matic]
- "Smelling Medicinal" on All Areas, Vol. 41 (Visions Magazine, 2003) [Germany]
- "I Am Six Pounds of Dynamite" on Gimme Danger (Uncut Magazine, 2005) [United Kingdom]
- "I Feel Too Young to Die" on We Have the Technology (Misra, 2006) [compilation also features Centro-Matic]
- "I Feel Too Young to Die" on New Colors (Misra, 2007) [compilation also features Centro-Matic and Will Johnson]
- "Emma Jane" on Houston Party 10 Aniversario (Sinedin, 2008)
