= Fort Recovery (album) =

Studio album by Centro-Matic
- Released: 2006
- Length: 47:12

Professional ratings
Review scores
Source	Rating
AllMusic	4/5 stars
Pitchfork Media	(8.1/10)
PopMatters	8/10 stars

Fort Recovery is an album by Centro-Matic, released in 2006.

== Track listing ==
1. "Covered Up in Mines" – 4:12
2. "Calling Thermatico" – 3:53
3. "Patience for the Ride" – 5:24
4. "I See Through You" – 3:31
5. "In Such Crooked Time" – 4:16
6. "For New Starts" – 4:40
7. "The Fugitives Have Won" – 2:42
8. "Monument Sails" – 3:47
9. "Triggers & Trash Heaps" – 3:15
10. "Nothin' I Ever Seen" – 3:08
11. "Take the Maps & Run" – 2:37
12. "Take a Rake" – 5:47
