= Centro-Matic =

American alternative country band

Centro-matic
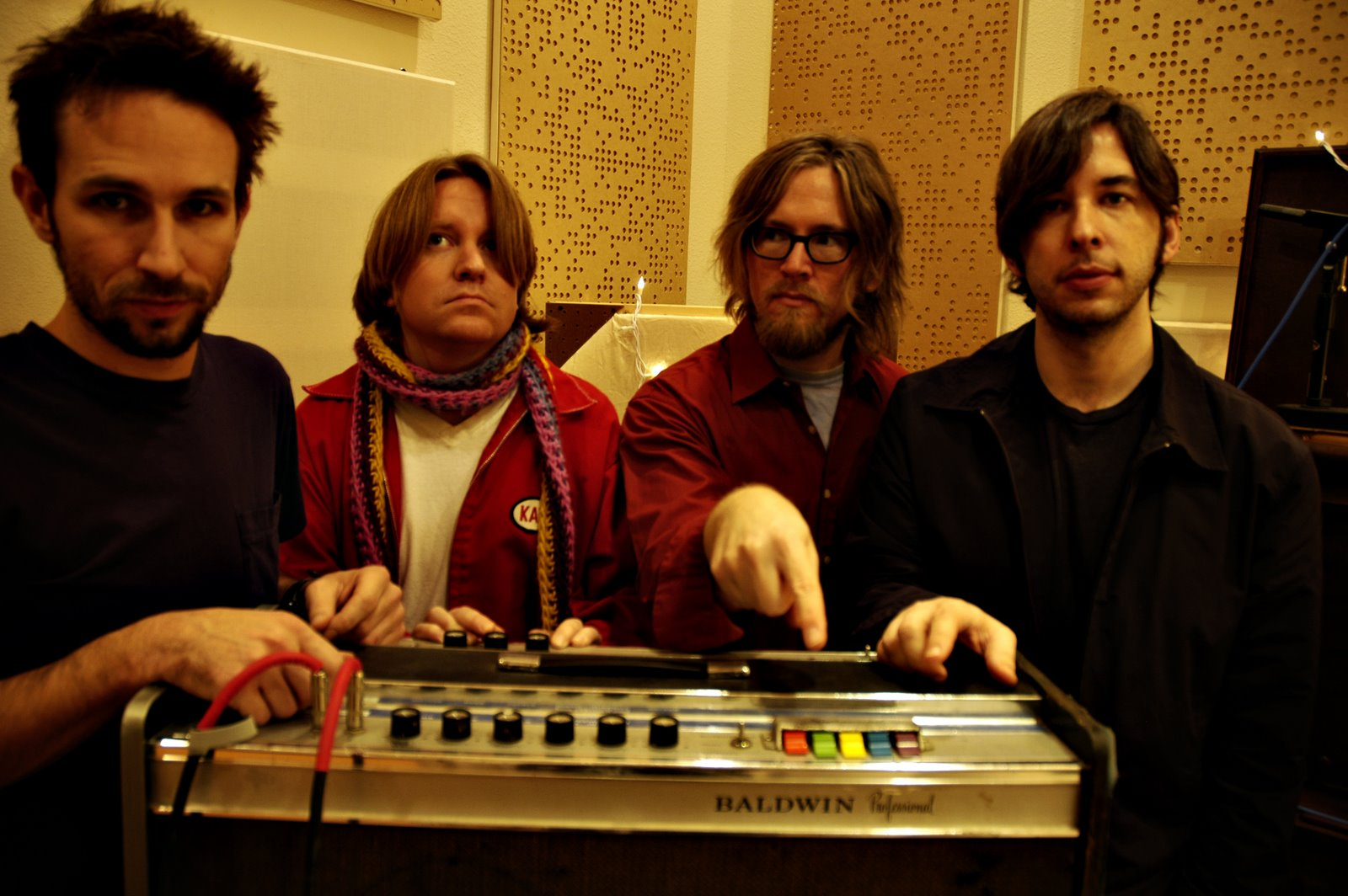
- Centro-matic at the Echo Lab

Background information
- Origin: Denton, Texas, United States
- Genres: Alternative country
- Years active: 1995–2014
- Labels: Idol, Misra, Quality Park
- Members: Will Johnson; Matt Pence; Scott Danbom; Mark Hedman
- Website: www.centro-matic.com

Centro-matic was an American band based in Denton, Texas.

== History ==
Centro-matic started in 1995 as a side-project for Will Johnson. It released a few singles that year and grew into a full-fledged group in 1997. The initial 60 songs recorded in a Millstadt, Illinois studio supplied the material for the quieter, more emotional Navigational on Idol Records and the louder, lo-fi The Static vs. the Strings, Vol. 1 on Quality Park Records.

Throughout his career, Johnson has had a reputation for being prolific and dynamic. So much so, that he built an entirely separate band, the much quieter side-project, South San Gabriel, named after the San Gabriel river fork north of Austin, Texas. The group consists of the same players from Centro-matic with the inclusion of guests, but focuses on more introspective and subdued offerings from Johnson's repertoire. Will has alternated between the two projects, while also releasing solo albums. Centro-matic released Distance and Clime on Idol in 2001 and Love You Just the Same on Misra in 2003. South San Gabriel released Welcome, Convalescense and The Carlton Chronicles in 2003 and 2005, respectively. Johnson's solo albums, Murder of Tides and Vultures Await, appeared in 2002 and 2004. Centro-matic followed up Love You Just the Same with Fort Recovery in March 2006. The two-disc set Dual Hawks was released in 2008, with one disc featuring the songs of Centro-matic and the other featuring South San Gabriel.

Johnson was recently introduced as an "official member" of the band Monsters of Folk, also consisting of Conor Oberst, Jim James, and M. Ward, on an episode of Austin City Limits the group performed on. On the taping, and on tour, Johnson serves as the band's drummer, provides backup vocals, as well as performing some material of his own.

Johnson was also a member of the group The Undertow Orchestra, featuring David Bazan, Mark Eitzel and the late Vic Chesnutt. https://web.archive.org/web/20140925033455/http://www.centro-matic.com/2014/december-tour-dates/ Johnson and Scott Danbom have performed as part of Drive-By Truckers frontman Patterson Hood's band, during his solo tours.

In September, 2014 the band announced that it would cease performing following their December, 2014 tour. They played their final show at Dan's Silverleaf in Denton, Texas on December 21, 2014.

Centro-matic reunited on January 18, 2025, in Mexico City, Mexico, at Lunario Auditorio Nacional. The band opened for Jason Isbell and the 400 Unit. Jason played guitar on several songs with Centro-matic as did Sadler Vaden. Will Johnson returned to the stage as part of the 400 Unit where he played drums, guitar, and wail on the gong.

== Members ==
- Will Johnson (singer, guitarist, songwriter)
- Matt Pence (drums and percussion)
- Scott Danbom (piano, violin, backing vocals, bass)
- Mark Hedman (bass, guitar)

== Discography ==
Studio albums

- Redo the Stacks (Steve 1996)
- Navigational (Idol 1999)
- The Static vs. the Strings Vol. 1 (Idol/Quality Park 1999)
- All the Falsest Hearts Can Try (Idol/Quality Park/Munich 1999)
- South San Gabriel Songs/Music (Idol/Munich 2000) [credited to South San Gabriel on Netherlands release]
- Distance and Clime (Idol/Munich 2001)
- Love You Just The Same (Misra/Munich 2003)
- Fort Recovery (Misra/Cooking Vinyl/Houston Party 2006)
- Centro-matic/South San Gabriel: Dual Hawks 2 CD/LP (Misra/Cooking Vinyl/Houston Party 2008)
- Candidate Waltz (Undertow Music Collective 2011)
- Take Pride in Your Long Odds (Navigational Transmissions 2014)

Singles and EPs

- Most Everyone Will Find + 2 (Munich, 2000) [Netherlands]
- "Truth Flies Out" + 2 (Munich, 2001) [Netherlands]
- Vermont + Centro-Matic = Opportunity split EP with Vermont (Quality Park, 2001)
- Flashes and Cables + 5 EP (Misra, 2004)
- Triggers and Trash Heaps + 3 EP (Misra, 2006)
- "The Fugitives Have Won" + 2 EP (Cooking Vinyl, 2006) [United Kingdom]
- Live At Austin City Limits Music Festival (self-released, 2006) [14-track digital-only release on Amazon and iTunes; no longer available]
- Operation Motorcide EP (Houston Party, 2007) [Spain]
- Eyas split EP with South San Gabriel (self-released, 2010) [digital-only release on Amazon and iTunes]

7-inch records

- Transistor EP (Automatic, 1996)
- Forget The Sixth Step (Steve, 1996)
- Tympanum (Transcontinental Recording Company/Quality Park, 1997)
- "Love Has Found Me Somehow" split 7-inch with Tripping Daisy (Good, 1999)

Cassettes

- Non-Directional Jetpack Race (Steve, 1995)
- Line Connection Aim (self-released, 1997)

Compilation appearances

- "Misunderstanding Surplus in the Getaway Car" on Dallas Observer Scene/Heard, Vol. 2 (1995) [as 'The Centromatic Band']
- "My, My" on Band-Kits: A Collection of Music From Denton, Texas (Quality Park, 2000)
- "Most Everyone Will Find" on Oorgasm 04 (Oor Magazine, 2000) [Netherlands]
- "Fuselage (It's Starting To Look Like Christmas Once Again)" on Electric Ornaments (Idol, 2000)
- "Most Everyone Will Find" on Awesome (Munich, 2001) [Netherlands]
- "Truth Flies Out" on Esto No Es Un Cactus (Sinedin, 2001) [Spain; compilation also includes South San Gabriel]
- "Fountains Of Fire" on New Voices, Vol 48 (Rolling Stone, 2001) [Germany]
- "Truth Flies Out" on Oorgasm 07 (Oor Magazine, 2001) [Netherlands]
- "To Unleash The Horses Now" on Sounds Of The New West Vol. 3 (Uncut Magazine, 2002) [United Kingdom]
- "Huge In Every City" and "On the Sagtikos" on Vital Idol: Idol Records Sampler (Idol, 2003)
- Just For Fun (Loretta Records, 2003)
- "Fuselage (It's Starting To Look Like Christmas Once Again)" on De Avonden Xmas 2003 (VPRO Radio, 2003) [Netherlands]
- "Silver Plate Complaints" on New Noises, Vol. 60 (Rolling Stone, 2003) [Germany]
- "Flashes and Cables" on Musikexpress 81 - Sounds Now! (Musikexpress, 2003) Germany
- "Covered Up In Mines" on Already Gone: A Compilation of Texas Bands (Already Gone, 2004)
- "Triggers and Trash Heaps" on We Have The Technology (Misra, 2006) [compilation also includes Will Johnson]
- "Don't Talk (Put Your Head On My Shoulder" [Beach Boys cover] on Do It Again: A Tribute To Pet Sounds (Houston Party, 2006) [Spain]
- "Flashes and Cables" on New Colors (Misra, 2007) [compilation also features South San Gabriel and Will Johnson]
- "I, the Kite" on Great (Misra/Absolutely Kosher, 2008) [promo CD-R]
- "Love Has Found Me Somehow" on A Splash of Sunshine, Vol. 2 (679 Recordings, 2008)
