= Jason Holstrom =

American musician (born 1976)

Jason Holstrom (born August 3, 1976) is a Seattle-based musician and member of Seattle bands United State of Electronica (U.S.E.) and Wonderful.

His solo projects include The Thieves of Kailua, Tonight Sky and Sunstrom Sound Solar Cycle, a series of ambient albums following the Earth's seasonal path around the Sun. In 2012 he created music for the This American Life Live show, including the score for the Mike Birbiglia short film Fresh Air 2: 2 Fresh 2 Furious.

== Discography ==
=== Wonderful ===
- Welcome to Wonderful, Wonderful (2001) — bass guitar, electronic keyboards, vocals
- God Bless Our Pad, Wonderful (2003) — bass guitar, keyboards, guitar, saxophone, vocals, recording, production, mixing
- Wake Up to Dreamland, Wonderful (2011) — bass, vocals, co production, mixing, engineering.

=== U.S.E ===
- U.S.E., United State of Electronica (2004) — guitar, vocals, keyboards, ukulele, production, engineering, mixing, mastering
- Party People EP, United State of Electronica (2005) — guitar, vocals, engineering, mixing, mastering
- LOVEWORLD, U.S.E. (2009) — guitar, vocals, co production, mixing, engineering.

=== Solo ===
- The Thieves of Kailua (2007) — writing, performing, production, engineering, mixing.
- Tonight Sky, (2013) -- writing, production, engineering, mixing.
- Vernal, Sunstrom Sound (2015) -- composition, production.
- Estival, Sunstrom Sound (2015) -- composition, production.
- Autumnal, Sunstrom Sound (2015) -- composition, production.
- Hibernal, Sunstrom Sound (2015) -- composition, production.
- CABANALIVE 9-22-16, Sunstrom Sound (2018) -- composition, production, live mixing.
- STORMSPACE, Sunstrom Sound (2021) -- Composition, production, mastering.
- Honeycrunch, Sunstrom Sound (2023) -- Composition, production, mastering.

=== Production - Other Artists ===
- Suburbiac, Dolour (2002) - saxophone on "Chasing the Wrong Girl Home"
- New Old Friends, Dolour (2004) — ukulele, vocals, saxophone, engineering, mixing
- Tomorrow's Taken, Ian McGlynn (2004) — mixing, mastering
- Blow Up, Kandy Whales (2004) — engineering, mixing, mastering
- MP3, Mister Pleasant (Josh Ottum) (2004) — mixing, mastering
- I Sold Gold, Aqueduct (2005) — guitar, engineering, mixing
- Pistols at Dawn (EP), Aqueduct (2004) — guitar, engineering, mixing
- Or Give Me Death, Aqueduct (2007) — co-production, engineering, mixing, guitar, vocals
- The Years in the Wilderness, Dolour (2007) — mixing, engineering, bass guitar, vocals
- It's Alright EP, Josh Ottum (2007) — mastering
- Who Left the Lights On EP (Europe), Josh Ottum (2007) — mastering
- I'm Gonna Live the Life I Sing About in My Song Shane Tutmarc & the Traveling Mercies (2007) — mixing, mastering
- Hey Lazarus! Shane Tutmarc & The Traveling Mercies (2008) - mixing, mastering
- Rising From Ashes Score, Joshua Myers (2012) -- additional composition, engineering.
- 2 Fresh 2 Furious, from This American Life Live. (2012) score, production.
- Christmas With My Baby, Dolour (2017) - ukulele, engineering.
- Side You Play (Sunstrom Sound Remix), Subways on the Sun (2018) - Remixing, synthesizers.

== See also ==
- United State of Electronica
- Wonderful
- Aqueduct
- Sunstrom Sound
- Music of Seattle
- Dolour
