= Charlie Smith (musician, born 1979) =

American musical artist

- Born: January 30, 1979 (age 47); Cashmere, Washington, United States
- Origin: Seattle, Washington
- Genres: Jazz; Pop; Hip hop
- Occupations: Musician, composer, arranger, record producer
- Instruments: Saxophone, piano
- Website: therealcharliesmith.com

Charlie Smith is an American jazz and pop saxophonist, pianist, and record producer.

== Early career ==
Smith began his career as a saxophonist and pianist at Cornish College of the Arts in Seattle.

Inspired by his mentor, Jim Knapp, and early collaborator Julian Priester, he formed a jazz big band, Charlie Smith Circle. The band released its debut album, Ahead and Behind, in 2004.

== Pop music ==
In 2006 Smith began working with musicians outside the jazz community. He wrote horn arrangements for Josh Ottum's Like The Season and Aqueduct's, Or Give Me Death. In 2008 he joined the Seattle indie-pop band Throw Me the Statue, playing bass, keyboards, saxophone, and writing horn arrangements. Smith appeared as a player and producer on the band's EP, Purpleface and second album, Creaturesque. Smith produced the second album by Seattle hip hop MC, Katie Kate, Nation. Also released in 2014 was the Charlie Smith produced Kairos EP on Fin Records in Seattle. Working closely with Polyvinyl Records artist Pillar Point, Smith helped develop the band's sound.

In Summer 2014 Smith was named Seattle's best producer by the alternative paper Seattle Weekly in their annual Best of Seattle issue.

== Discography ==
=== As leader ===
- Charlie Smith Circle, Ahead and Behind (2004) – composer, arranger

=== As producer ===
- Victor Noriega, "Stone's Throw", (2006)
- Aqueduct, Or Give Me Death, (2007)
- Throw Me the Statue, "Purpleface" (2008)
- Throw Me the Statue, "Creaturesque", (2009)
- Annabel Lee, "Lone Bodies" (2012)
- Truckasuarus, "2012" (2012)
- Pollens "Brighten & Break" (2012)
- Kairos, "EP" (2014)
