= Bazan: Alone at the Microphone =

Live album (DVD) by David Bazan
- Released: October 21, 2008
- Length: 64 minutes

Bazan: Alone at the Microphone is a 64-minute DVD featuring David Bazan performing songs from his Pedro the Lion, Headphones, and Bazan solo catalog. The DVD also has candid interviews with Bazan about his family, music, and life on tour.

It was filmed at his home studio near Seattle, WA in mid-2008.

The DVD was released on October 21, 2008. The audio tracks and video outtakes from the DVD were available as free downloads during the pre-order phase before the official release.

== Live performances ==
- Never Wanted You
- When They Really Get to Know You
- Fewer Moving Parts
- Options
- June 18, 1976
- Slow and Steady Wins the Race
- Cold Beer & Cigarettes
- Shit Talker
- Transcontinental
- Priests & Paramedics
- Please Baby Please

== Interview segments ==
- Songwriting: Then & Now
- Family
- Disappointed Fans
- Playing Live
- Love Songs
