= Havasu (album) =

Studio album by Pedro the Lion
- Released: January 20, 2022
- Length: 39:40
- Label: Polyvinyl
- Producers: Andy D. Park; David Bazan

Pedro the Lion chronology
Phoenix (2019)	Havasu (2022)	Santa Cruz (2024)

Professional ratings
Review scores
Source	Rating
Mojo	6/10
Paste	7.8/10
Pitchfork	7.5/10
Uncut	7/10

Havasu is the sixth studio album by American indie rock band Pedro the Lion. It was a surprise release, released on January 20, 2022, through Polyvinyl Record Co.

It is the sequel to their previous album Phoenix and details songwriter David Bazan's childhood in the city of Lake Havasu City, Arizona. The album was followed up by Santa Cruz that talks about Bazan's life once he moved out of Arizona.

== Track listing ==
All lyrics are written by David Bazan; all music is composed by David Bazan; "Don't Wanna Move" co-composed by Erik Walters, "Too Much" co-composed by Andy Fitts.

No.	Title	Length
1.	"Don't Wanna Move"	4:03
2.	"Too Much"	3:29
3.	"First Drum Set"	5:17
4.	"Teenage Sequencer"	4:16
5.	"Own Valentine"	3:17
6.	"Making the Most of It"	3:57
7.	"Old Wisdom"	3:21
8.	"Stranger"	4:33
9.	"Good Feeling"	4:46
10.	"Lost Myself"	2:38
Total length:		39:40

== Personnel ==
Pedro the Lion

- David Bazan – vocals, all instruments, production, cover photography
- Sean Lane – "the bike" (Note: "The bike" is custom-made instrument that consists of "various metal objects and strings mounted on a bicycle frame, rigged with contact mics and run through a drone-accentuating pedalboard.") (all tracks), percussion (tracks 3, 4, 8)
- Erik Walters

Additional contributors

- Andy D. Park – production, mixing, engineering (all tracks); keyboards (5), additional keyboards (4, 8)
- Chris Colbert – mastering
- Jesse LeDoux – art direction
- Ryan Russell – studio photography
