= Headphones (album) =

Studio album by Headphones
- Released: 10 May 2005
- Genre: Indie rock, indietronica
- Label: Suicide Squeeze Records

Professional ratings
Review scores
Source	Rating
Allmusic	3.5/5 stars
Pitchfork Media	(7.0/10)

Headphones is the only album by Headphones. The album features David Bazan on keyboards, and Frank Lenz (of Starflyer 59) on drums. Tim Walsh (formerly of Pedro the Lion) also contributed to the recording, albeit sparsely, as Bazan attested in November 2006:

. . .Tim and I discussed the possibility of delegating the drums and recording to Lenz and Hankins so we could focus on the music and the "vibe" and all that. Not realizing that we were delegating Tim right off the record, because he then wouldn't have any concrete responsibilities. And he had a tough time feeling like he was needed during the making of the record, and I was overloaded trying to finish writing while tracking my parts so Lenz would have something to drum to.

Headphones was engineered and mixed by Jared Hankins in Seattle in early 2005.

== Track listing ==
1. "Gas and Matches" – 3:23
2. "Shit Talker" – 3:23
3. "Hot Girls" – 3:44
4. "I Never Wanted You" – 4:17
5. "Major Cities" – 2:19
6. "Natural Disaster" – 3:46
7. "Hello Operator" – 2:54
8. "Pink and Brown" – 3:24
9. "Wise Blood" – 3:40
10. "Slow Car Crash" – 2:57
- iTunes bonus track:
11. "The Five Chord" – 3:21
