= Headphones (disambiguation) =

Headphones are a pair of small speakers mounted on a band for placing on one's head.

Headphones may also refer to:

== Music ==
=== Songs ===
- "Headphones" (Lecrae, Killer Mike, and T.I. song), 2025
- "Headphones" (Little Boots song), 2012
- "Headphones", by Baker Boy featuring Lara Andallo from the 2021 album Gela
- "Headphones", by Matt Nathanson featuring Lolo
- "Headphones", a song by Jars of Clay from the 2009 album The Long Fall Back to Earth
- "Headphones", a 2022 song by Banx & Ranx

=== Other music ===
- Headphones (band), an American indie rock band
- Headphones (album), their album of the same name

== See also ==
- Headphone Dust, a record label
- Earphones (disambiguation)
