= Power Ballads =

Power Ballads may refer to:

- Power Ballads (Aqueduct album), 2003
- Power Ballads (London Elektricity album), 2005
- Power Ballad (film), a 2026 musical comedy film

== See also ==
- Power ballad
- Power Balladz
- Ballad (disambiguation)
