= It's Hard to Find a Friend =

Studio album by Pedro the Lion
- Released: (original) November 3, 1998 (remastered) October 16, 2001
- Recorded: 1998
- Genre: Indie rock, slowcore, emo
- Length: 42:47
- Label: Made in Mexico; Jade Tree
- Producer: David Bazan

Pedro the Lion chronology
Whole EP (1997)	It's Hard to Find a Friend (1998)	The Only Reason I Feel Secure (1999)

Professional ratings
Review scores
Source	Rating
Allmusic	4.5/5 stars
Pitchfork Media	(7.8/10)

It's Hard to Find a Friend is the debut full-length album by Pedro the Lion. It was originally released on November 3, 1998 on Made in Mexico records. A re-mastered version of the original recording was released on October 16, 2001 on Jade Tree Records.

== Critical reception ==
Pitchfork gave the album a score of 7.8 out of 10, with reviewer Jeremy Schneyer favorably comparing the sound of the album to Luna and describing its "downtempo, kind of typical indie rock" sound as "bitchin'."

In a 2008 retrospective review, Sputnikmusic praised the album for its lyrical work and stripped-down instrumentation.

Tape Op reviewer Adam Selzer, noting that the album was recorded to reel-to-reel tape, praised the album for its "great guitar tones and pure, natural drum sounds." KEXP blogger Dust Henry similarly praised it the "lushest sounding recordings between all of Bazan’s work."

== Track listing ==
All songs written by David Bazan

1. "Of Up and Coming Monarchs" – 3:00
2. "The Longer I Lay Here" – 3:04
3. "Big Trucks" – 2:32
4. "Suspect Fled the Scene" – 3:56
5. "Bad Diary Days" – 4:01
6. "The Longest Winter" – 4:12
7. "When They Really Get to Know You They Will Run" – 2:34
8. "Of Minor Prophets and Their Prostitute Wives" – 2:48
9. "The Bells" – 4:09
10. "Secret of the Easy Yoke" – 6:41
11. "The Well" – 3:31
12. "Promise" – 2:19

== Personnel ==
- David Bazan · vocals, guitar, drums
- Johnathon Ford · bass
