= Control (Pedro the Lion album) =

Studio album by Pedro the Lion
- Released: April 16, 2002
- Recorded: 2001
- Genre: Indie rock, emo
- Length: 40:18
- Label: Jade Tree (JT1072)
- Producer: David Bazan

Pedro the Lion chronology
Progress (2000)	Control (2002)	Achilles Heel (2004)

Professional ratings
Aggregate scores
Source	Rating
Metacritic	75/100
Review scores
Source	Rating
Allmusic	4/5 stars
Pitchfork Media	(7.2/10)
Rolling Stone	(favorable)

Control is the third full-length album by Pedro the Lion. It was released on April 16, 2002 on Jade Tree Records. It is a concept album about a businessman who has an extramarital affair, and his untimely death at the hands of his spurned wife. It reached number 36 on the Top Independent Albums chart.

== Music and lyrical themes ==
Like its predecessor, Winners Never Quit, Control is billed as a concept album. It covers such subject matter as infidelity, parenthood, greed, commercialism, vengeance, and fear of death. While not autobiographical, Bazan has described the album as being about his "disappointment with the world and how it works."

Musically, the album departs from previous recordings, with a greater emphasis on rock music, including distorted guitars, synthesizers, and loud drums; in its retrospective review for the album's 20th anniversary, Stereogum described the album as "the heaviest Pedro the Lion album, both in tone and sonically." Bazan has suggested that the heavier nature of the album was due in part to pressure he felt from the record label to write songs more similar to the faster pieces from his earlier albums.

Others have described it as more aggressive, darker, and intense than previous albums, with more overtly sarcastic and cynical lyrics. On Control being darker than his previous work, Bazan stated that his parents were "especially concerned" about the album.

== Critical reception ==
Tiny Mix Tapes gave the album five out of five stars, citing the songs' catchiness and memorable lyrics. In a 2008 retrospective review, Sputnikmusic similarly gave the album a five out of five, designating it a "classic" and praising it for its sincerity and simplicity.

Pitchfork gave Control a score of 7.2 out of 10, despite mostly critiquing the album's lyrics and sluggish tempo. AllMusic reviewer Adam Bregman describes the album's songs as "strong," though views it as delivering nothing new relative to the band's previous releases.

Bazan has remarked on this album's lyrical content being divisive among his Christian following, noting several instances of fans chastising him for their interpretations of the album's lyrics and themes during the Control tour.

== Track listing ==
All songs by Bazan except "Options" (co-written with TW Walsh), "Penetration" and "Second Best" (co-written with Casey Foubert).

1. "Options" – 3:56
2. "Rapture" – 3:26
3. "Penetration" – 3:55
4. "Indian Summer" – 3:21
5. "Progress" – 4:09
6. "Magazine" – 4:01
7. "Rehearsal" – 3:48
8. "Second Best" – 6:00
9. "Priests And Paramedics" – 4:35
10. "Rejoice" – 3:11

== Personnel ==
- David Bazan – vocals, drums, guitars, bass guitar, keyboards
- Casey Foubert – bass guitar, keyboards, guitars, percussion
- Design and Illustration by Ryan Clark for Asterik Studio
