= Slow and Steady Wins the Race (disambiguation) =

Slow and Steady Wins the Race is the moral of The Tortoise and the Hare fable. It may refer to

- Slow and Steady Wins the Race, a fashion label
- "Slow and Steady Wins the Race" (song)

== See also ==
- "Slow and Steady", a song
