= CPR (EP) =

EP by Dolour
- Released: September 2003
- Label: B-Side Records

CPR (EP) is the name of Dolour's EP, released September 2003 on B-Side Records. It was written, arranged and produced by Shane Tutmarc. It debuted "You Can't Make New Old Friends" and "CPR" later released (with a different mix and master) on New Old Friends.

== Track listing ==
1. "CPR"
2. "You Can't Make New Old Friends"
3. "(Why Don't You) Come Around"
