= Curse Your Branches =

Studio album by David Bazan
- Released: September 1, 2009
- Recorded: 2008–2009, Bazan's home studio, Seattle, Washington, United States
- Genres: Indie rock, folk rock
- Length: 36:42
- Language: English
- Label: Barsuk (bark83)
- Producer: David Bazan

David Bazan chronology
| Fewer Moving Parts (2006) | Curse Your Branches (2009) | Live at Electrical Audio (2010) |

Curse Your Branches is the first full-length album by David Bazan, the front-man of the indie rock band Pedro the Lion. It was released on September 1, 2009, on Barsuk Records.

== Background and release ==
The album was recorded from early 2008 to mid-2009 by David Bazan in his basement studio near Seattle, Washington. Additional recording, mixing, and mastering was done by long-time collaborator and former Pedro the Lion member T. W. Walsh at his studio in Massachusetts.

The same day as this album was released, Bazan also put out a single covering Bob Dylan's "The Man in Me" backed with Leonard Cohen's "Hallelujah".

== Critical reception ==
Professional ratings
Aggregate scores
| Source | Rating |
|---|---|
| Metacritic | 82/100 |
Review scores
| Source | Rating |
| AllMusic | 4/5 stars |
| Alternative Press | 4/5 stars |
| The A.V. Club | B+ |
| Christgau’s Consumer Guide | A– |
| Drowned In Sound | 8/10 |
| Los Angeles Times | 3.5/4 stars |
| Paste | 8.9/10 |
| PopMatters | 8/10 |
| Tiny Mix Tapes | 4.5/5 stars |
| Under the Radar | 8/10 |

On review aggregator Metacritic the album holds a score of 82/100, based on 19 critic's reviews, indicating "universal acclaim".

The album debuted at #1 on the Billboard Heatseekers chart and #116 on the Billboard 200 the week of its release.

== Track listing ==
All songs written by David Bazan, except where otherwise noted

1. "Hard to Be" – 6:23
2. "Bless This Mess" – 3:57
3. "Please Baby, Please" – 3:49
4. "Curse Your Branches" – 3:34
5. "Harmless Sparks" – 2:30
6. "When We Fell" – 3:40
7. "Lost My Shape" – 3:44
8. "Bearing Witness" – 3:13
9. "Heavy Breath" – 3:19
10. "In Stitches" – 4:33

iTunes Store bonus tracks

11. "The Man in Me" (Bob Dylan) – 2:55

== Personnel ==
- David Bazan – vocals, guitar, drums, synthesizer, bass guitar, piano, engineering, production

Additional musicians

- David H. Bazan – piano
- Andy Fitts – vocals
- Casey Foubert – pedal steel guitar
- Yukki Matthews – bass guitar, electric guitar
- James McAlister – percussion
- Josh Ottum – lead guitar
- John Roderick – vocals, guitar
- J. Tillman – vocals
- T. W. Walsh – bass guitar, mixing, mastering, engineering
- Blake Wescott – vocals

Other personnel

- Bob Andrews – photography
- Christian Helms and Renee Fernandez (The Decoder Ring) – cover art
