= Santa Cruz (album) =

2024 studio album by Pedro the Lion

Studio album by Pedro the Lion
- Released: June 7, 2024
- Studio: Recorded by Andy D. Park at The Crumb
- Genres: Indie rock, electronic
- Length: 35:44
- Label: Polyvinyl
- Producers: Andy D. Park & David Bazan

Pedro the Lion chronology
Havasu (2022)	Santa Cruz (2024)

Santa Cruz is a studio album by Pedro the Lion. Released on June 7, 2024 it is the seventh Pedro the Lion LP and forms their third in a planned five album arc following 2019's Phoenix and 2022's Havasu. Santa Cruz forms part of an autobiographical telling of the lead singer David Bazan's adolescence, focusing on a year spent in Santa Cruz, California.

David said that the timeline for this album should overlap with the next album in the set which will be called Paradise named after the city of the same name in California about three hours away. This appears to be a difference from the prior albums where he would leave his old city behind so that he could completely move to the new one. According to David as of August 2026 the band is working on the two albums in the series that follow Santa Cruz which will be Paradise and Seattle. "Working on the next couple in the series that will be five total."

== Music videos ==
There have been videos made for "Modesto," "Don't Cry Now," and "Spend Time."

Music Videos, Live Performances and Album Streams
- Modesto https://pedrothelion.com/video/modesto/
- Don't Cry Now https://www.youtube.com/watch?v=9Z-k7QO-x0U
- Spend Time https://www.youtube.com/watch?v=aBXtkiLy1B8
- KEXP Set promoting the Santa Cruz https://www.youtube.com/watch?v=_dHPL4fc91Y&t=1218s
- Live at the Crumb that features Santa Cruz songs and a Grandaddy cover https://youtube.com/playlist?list=PLuHViXH2XeFRgJiH5WSAm4as-Y2Y76Npe&si=lxvSLV_8K7Jnbmr7
- Full album stream https://youtube.com/playlist?list=PLuHViXH2XeFSVbbEwUJoDb7YtF6R8O-Qi&si=p02XevbDUizmkxPu
- All the Pedro the Lion Albums about the places Dave grew up https://youtube.com/playlist?list=PLuHViXH2XeFR8KOz3fEv_-jmO05ZHcuRe&si=wyxtONqbt0_ibSDN
- Gear Talk playlist about the instruments used to make Santa Cruz https://youtube.com/playlist?list=PLuHViXH2XeFQWR945ErWi5jUWQ4rZizVt&si=ApSFV-Vx69_shv9f

== Inspirations ==
Around the time the album came out David set up a playlist on streaming platforms to list some of the songs he listened to when Santa Cruz takes place. The song Modesto references Grandaddy. Little Help recalls the first time he listened to the Beatles White Album. Particularly the song Birthday which he listened to, coincidentally, on his very own birthday.

== Live performance ==
David took a major performance change on the tour promoting Santa Cruz by becoming the band's drummer instead of the bass player. Bazan previously sung about his love of playing the drums on the song "First Drum Set" from Havasu. At the beginning of the Santa Cruz tour the song "Tall Pines" often lead straight into "Model Homes" off Phoenix. This further established the multiple ways Phoenix, Havasu, and Santa Cruz work together both musically and lyrically.

== Reception ==
Professional ratings
Review scores
Source	Rating
Firenote	3.5/5
Paste	7.7/10
Pitchfork	7.3/10
Sputnikmusic	3.5/5

Writing for NPR, Ann Powers described Santa Cruz as the boldest of Pedro the Lion's most recent albums. She wrote that Bazan's voice "has never been more relaxed and evocative" and drew comparisons with other albums featuring songwriters' explorations of their own youths such as The Sunset Tree (The Mountain Goats), Carrie & Lowell (Sufjan Stevens) and good kid, m.A.A.d city (Kendrick Lamar).

== Track listing ==
All lyrics are written by David Bazan; all music is composed by David Bazan with Erik Walters & Andy D. Park

No.	Title	Lyrics	Music	Length
1.	"It'll All Work Out"			3:12
2.	"Santa Cruz"			2:40
3.	"Little Help"			3:05
4.	"Tall Pines"			2:58
5.	"Don't Cry Now"	written with Andy Fitts	keys by Andy Fitts	3:28
6.	"Remembering"			2:52
7.	"Teacher's Pet"	written with Charles Chace		3:58
8.	"Parting"			3:28
9.	"Modesto"			3:54
10.	"Spend Time"			2:36
11.	"Only Yesterday"			3:34
Total length:				35:44
