= Winners Never Quit =

Studio album by Pedro the Lion
- Released: March 28, 2000
- Recorded: 1999
- Genre: Indie rock
- Length: 39:00
- Label: Jade Tree (JT1046)
- Producer: David Bazan

Pedro the Lion chronology
The Only Reason I Feel Secure (1999)	Winners Never Quit (2000)	Progress (2000)

Professional ratings
Aggregate scores
Source	Rating
Metacritic	72/100
Review scores
Source	Rating
AllMusic	3/5 stars
Pitchfork	4.1/10
Sputnikmusic	4/5 stars
Visions	7/12

Winners Never Quit is the second album by Pedro the Lion. It was released on March 28, 2000, on Jade Tree Records. Although David Bazan played all of the instruments on the album, Trey Many (drums), and Josh Golden (bass) joined Bazan on tour later that year.

== Music and lyrical themes ==
Winners Never Quit is a concept album about the rise and fall of a corrupt politician. It explores themes of pride, arrogance, and redemption from within the context of Christianity, with Bazan stating, "This record is a complete, connected narrative from the first to last song. There was a theme I wanted to communicate: Damnation for the arrogant, judgment for the judgmental". Bazan has also noted that this album, alongside its follow-up Control, explores his dissatisfaction with hypocrisy within both the Christian Church and the United States at the time.

Musically, the album has been ranges from sparse, acoustic tracks to "noisy power pop", and has been compared to midwest emo and slowcore.

== Critical reception ==
Review aggregator Metacritic notes that Winners Never Quit received "generally favorable reviews" based on a weighted average score of 72 out of 100 from five critic scores.

Salon praised the album for its emotional tenor and Bazan's ability to "convey the horror and contorted anguish of his protagonist without trivializing either." LA Weekly praised the album for its concision and musicality, with reviewer Adam Bregman favorably comparing its acoustic songs it to indie rock band Sebadoh.

The Austin Chronicle gave the album three out of five stars, stating that the band "succeeds in making music that's not merely serious, but important as well." AllMusic dismisses the album as mostly "a curiosity," but highlights the opening track, "Slow and Steady Wins the Race," as a standout track.

Pitchfork negatively reviewed the album, with author Brent DiCrescenzo unfavorably comparing the album's more rock-oriented songs to Foo Fighters and criticizing Bazan's appearance and faith. Bazan responded to the since-deleted review in an interview, calling it an ad hominem attack, and references the faith-based critique on the 2006 album Fewer Moving Parts.

== Track listing ==
1. "Slow and Steady Wins the Race" – 3:44
2. "Simple Economics" – 4:22
3. "To Protect the Family Name" – 5:29
4. "A Mind of Her Own" – 3:56
5. "Never Leave a Job Half Done" – 3:12
6. "Eye on the Finish Line" – 4:37
7. "Bad Things to Such Good People" – 3:24
8. "Winners Never Quit" – 5:16
  Japanese bonus track:
9. "Slow and Steady Wins the Race (alternate version with Ben Gibbard)" – 3:20

All songs by David Bazan except #3 (written with Chris Pugmire)
