= Waiting for a World War =

Waiting for a World of War

Studio album by Dolour
- Released: April 17, 2001
- Recorded: July – September 2000
- Genre: Indie pop
- Label: Sonic Boom Records
- Producer: Blake Wescott and Dolour

Dolour chronology
Waiting for a World of War (2001)	Suburbiac (2002)

Professional ratings
Review scores
Source	Rating
AllMusic	4/5 stars

Waiting for a World War is the debut album released by indie rock band Dolour. The album was produced by Blake Wescott and Dolour. The artwork was done by Jesse LeDoux.

== Track listing ==
All songs written by Shane Tutmarc (BMI)

1. So, So Sad
2. Sophie
3. Baby U Rescued Me
4. (No) Ordinary People
5. Ride The Black Stallion
6. Cleopatra Eyes
7. Ready to Fly
8. Now You're On Your Own
9. Old Age
10. Low Flying Planes
11. (Who Really Cares?)

== Musicians ==
- Shane Tutmarc — guitar, vocals, electric piano, synthesizer, percussion
- Joe Gregory — bass
- Paul Mumaw — drums

Additional keys and percussion by Casey Foubert and Blake Wescott
