= Tutmarc =

Tutmarc is a surname. The origins of the name are thought to be in the early medieval period in northern Europe, particularly Scandinavia.

Notable people with the surname include:

- Paul Tutmarc (1896–1972), American musician
- Shane Tutmarc (born 1981), American producer
