= Achilles Heel (album) =

Studio album by Pedro the Lion
- Released: May 25, 2004
- Genres: Indie rock; folk rock
- Length: 38:11
- Label: Jade Tree (JT1095)
- Producer: David Bazan

Pedro the Lion chronology
| Control (2002) | Achilles Heel (2004) | Phoenix (2019) |

Professional ratings
Aggregate scores
| Source | Rating |
|---|---|
| Metacritic | 71/100 |
Review scores
| Source | Rating |
| AllMusic | 4.5/5 stars |
| Pitchfork | (4.7/10) |

Achilles Heel (also known as Pedro the Lion's Achilles Heel) is the fourth album by indie rock band Pedro the Lion. It was released on May 25, 2004, on Jade Tree Records. The cover artwork was by Jesse LeDoux. It reached #26 on the Top Heatseekers and #24 on the Top Independent Albums charts.

== Music and lyrical themes ==
Achilles Heel marked a departure from the band's the heavier, rock-oriented sound on Control, featuring more upbeat melodies and sonic experimentation. The band's primary songwriter and multi-instrumentalist, David Bazan, additionally described the album as "less bleak" and "more multi-faceted" than the band's previous album.

== Critical reception ==
Achilles Heel received mixed reviews on its release, with multiple reviews opining its lack of focus relative to the band's previous two concept albums.

Stephen Thompson, writing for The A.V. Club, called the album "a bit of a hodge-podge," but ultimately praised its "exquisitely wrought, inimitably pessimistic epiphanies." Pitchfork panned the album in a 4.7 out of 10 review, calling it "topographically uniform" and a "stumble" for the band.

AllMusic, however, gave the album a 4.5 out of 5 rating, calling it "a beautiful and wavering mix of indie rock and country-folk" and the band's best album to date. Similarly, in its 2012 retrospective review, Sputnikmusic rated the album 4.5 out of 5, citing its more autobiographical elements as a highlight.

== Track listing ==
All tracks by David Bazan except "Keep Swinging" (co-written with T.W. Walsh) and "Start Without Me" (T.W. Walsh).

1. "Bands With Managers" – 3:46
2. "Foregone Conclusions" – 2:27
3. "The Fleecing" – 4:41
4. "Discretion" – 2:50
5. "Arizona" – 4:08
6. "Keep Swinging" – 2:53
7. "Transcontinental" – 2:38
8. "I Do" – 4:11
9. "A Simple Plan" – 3:41
10. "Start Without Me" – 3:11
11. "The Poison" – 3:46

== Personnel ==
- David Bazan — vocals, guitar, drums, synthesizer, bass and percussion
- T.W. Walsh — bass, drums, synthesizer and guitar
- James McAlister — percussion, drums and synthesizer
- Casey Foubert — guitar on "Keep Swinging"
- David Bazan, T.W. Walsh — engineering
- Chris Colbert — mixing
- Jesse LeDoux — cover art
