= The Only Reason I Feel Secure =

EP by Pedro the Lion
- Released: (original) 17 May 1999 (reissued) 16 October 2001
- Genre: Indie rock, emo
- Length: 34:46
- Label: Made in Mexico / Jade Tree (reissue)
- Producer: David Bazan

Pedro the Lion chronology
It's Hard to Find a Friend (1998)	The Only Reason I Feel Secure (1999)	Winners Never Quit (2000)

Jade Tree reissue
- cover art of reissue (Jade Tree Records)

Professional ratings
Review scores
Source	Rating
Pitchfork Media	8.4/10 link

The Only Reason I Feel Secure is the second EP by Pedro the Lion. It was released on 17 May 1999 on Made in Mexico Records, and later reissued with three extra tracks on 16 October 2001 on Jade Tree Records. Tracks 6–8 — songs that originally constituted Pedro the Lion's first single — appear only on the Jade Tree reissue.

The EP's title was originally intended to be The Only Reason I Feel Secure Is That I Am Validated By My Peers. The cover artwork was by Ben Brubaker and the original release included a panel that extended the image to the right and contained the phrase "is that i am validated by my peers."

== Critical reception ==
Pitchfork gave the EP a score of 8.4 out of 10, calling it "consistently and uniformly compelling." AllMusic favorably compares the EP's sound to Sebadoh, but notes that it establishes the band as "a driving, emotional force of its own."

== Personnel ==
- David Bazan — vocals, guitar
- Josh Golden — bass
- Ben Brubaker — drums, cover art

== Track listing ==
1. "Criticism as Inspiration" – 6:20
2. "I Am Always the One Who Calls" – 3:41
3. "Invention" – 4:44
4. "Letter From a Concerned Follower" – 4:11
5. "Be Thou My Vision" – 4:22
6. "Big Trucks" (single version) – 2:58
7. "Diamond Ring" – 3:22
8. "Invention" (single version) – 5:08

All songs by David Bazan except for "Be Thou My Vision" (traditional)
