= Ottum =

Ottum is a surname. Notable people with the surname include:

- Josh Ottum (born 1978), American musician, songwriter, and scholar
- Robert K. Ottum (1925–1986), American sports journalist and writer
