= Diamond ring =

Diamond ring or diamond rings may refer to:

- Diamond ring, a type of jewelry featuring a diamond
- Engagement ring
- The diamond ring effect, a feature of total solar eclipses
- Diamond Ring (professional wrestling), Japanese professional wrestling promotion
- Wedding ring
- Pre-engagement ring

== Music ==
- Diamond Rings (musician), an indie rock musician from Toronto, Canada
- "The Diamond Ring" (song), a song by Adair
- "Diamond Ring", a song by Bon Jovi from the 1995 album These Days
- "Diamond Ring", a song by Pedro the Lion from the 1999 EP The Only Reason I Feel Secure
- "Diamond Rings" (song), a 2009 song by rapper Chipmunk

== See also ==
- "This Diamond Ring", a 1965 pop song
- "This Diamond Ring", an episode of Dharma & Greg
