= Paper Heart =

Paper Heart or Paper Hearts may refer to:

- Paper Heart (film), a 2009 romantic comedy film
- Paper Heart, a 2013 album by Chlöe Howl
  - "Paper Heart", its title track, released as a single
- "Paper Heart", a 2011 song by Stealing Angels
- "Paper Hearts", the tenth episode of the fourth season of the science fiction television series The X-Files
- The Paper Hearts, an American rock band
- "Paper Hearts" (song), a 2017 song by The Vamps
- Paper Hearts, 2023 EP by Sleep Theory
