= United State of Electronica =

American electronic rock band

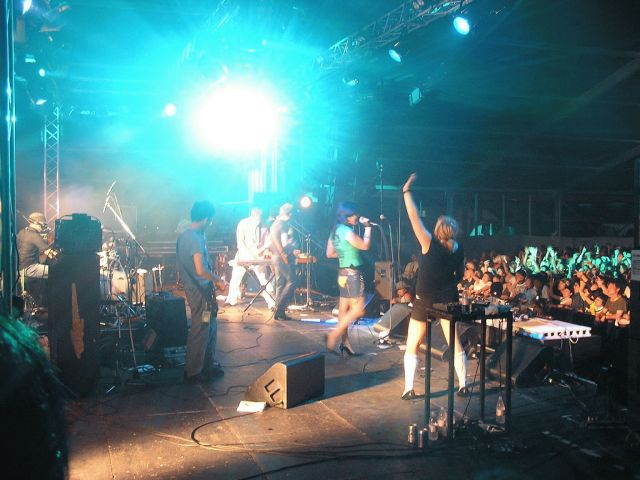

Background information
- Origin: Seattle, Washington, United States
- Genres: Electronic rock
- Years active: 2002–present
- Labels: Sonic Boom Recordings (United States); Side-Out Records (Japan)
- Members: Jason Holstrom; Jon e. Rock; Peter Sali; Noah Star Weaver; Derek Chan; Carly Nicklaus; Amanda Khanjian
- Website: Official Website

United State of Electronica, or U.S.E., is an American music group formed in 2002 based in Seattle, Washington. It includes the four members of the band Wonderful: Jason Holstrom (guitar, vocals), Jon e. Rock (drums, vocals), Peter Sali (guitar, vocals), and Noah Star Weaver (keyboards, vocoder), as well as Derek Chan (bass guitar), Carly Nicklaus (vocals), and Amanda Khanjian (vocals).

== History ==
U.S.E. was formed when the members of Wonderful and Shane Tutmarc posed as an imaginary electronica band from Mannheim, Germany at a Seattle-area nightclub. When the group noticed the audience's enthusiasm about their improvised dance songs, they decided to form a side project that would take dance music more seriously. Carly Nicklaus, Amanda Okonek and Derek Chan joined the members of Wonderful to develop that project, which would become the United State of Electronica.

U.S.E. released its debut self-titled, self-recorded album with handpainted covers in 2004. With no distribution, U.S.E turned to the Internet and gave the album to the world for free via http://www.mannheimworldwide.com. The album was released nationally through Sonic Boom Recordings in early 2005 and released in Japan in 2005 on Side-Out Records. U.S.E continued to tour the U.S. extensively with The Presidents of the United States of America, Ted Leo and the Pharmacists, The Hold Steady, Aqueduct, Schoolyard Heroes, The Divorce and many more. After "IT IS ON!" reached No. 4 on the Japanese music charts, U.S.E made three trips to Japan in 2005, including the 2005 Fuji Rock Festival and played the Sasquatch! Music Festival in Central Washington.

After another trip to Japan and tours to SXSW in 2006 and 2007, the U.S.E. album was again re-released in the U.K. by The Original Electronic Recording Company.

U.S.E's second full length "LOVEWORLD" was recorded in Seattle at Avast! Recording studios with engineer Cameron Nicklaus and with U.S.E at the Cabana. The songs "All The World", "Get That Feeling", "River of Love", live favorites "Dance With Me" and "Party People" are among others to be on the new LP. It was released on August 26, 2009.

Their song "Open Your Eyes" was used at E3 2008 for the New Xbox Experience Promo.

After more than 10 years of silence, the entire band came together to play a New Years Eve show at the end of 2019, along with Aqueduct and 52 kings.

== Band members ==
=== Current members ===
- Derek Chan — bass
- Jason Holstrom — guitar, vocals
- Carly Nicklaus — vocals
- Amanda Khanjian — vocals
- Jon e. Rock — drums, vocals
- Peter Sali — guitar, vocals
- Noah Star Weaver — keyboards, vocoder

=== Past members ===
- Shane Tutmarc — bass

== Discography ==
- Emerald City EP (2002)
- Emerald City 12" (2003)
- U.S.E. (2004)
- Live and Direct from the Emerald City EP (2005)
- Party People EP (2005)
- LOVEWORLD (2009)
