= Shane Tutmarc =

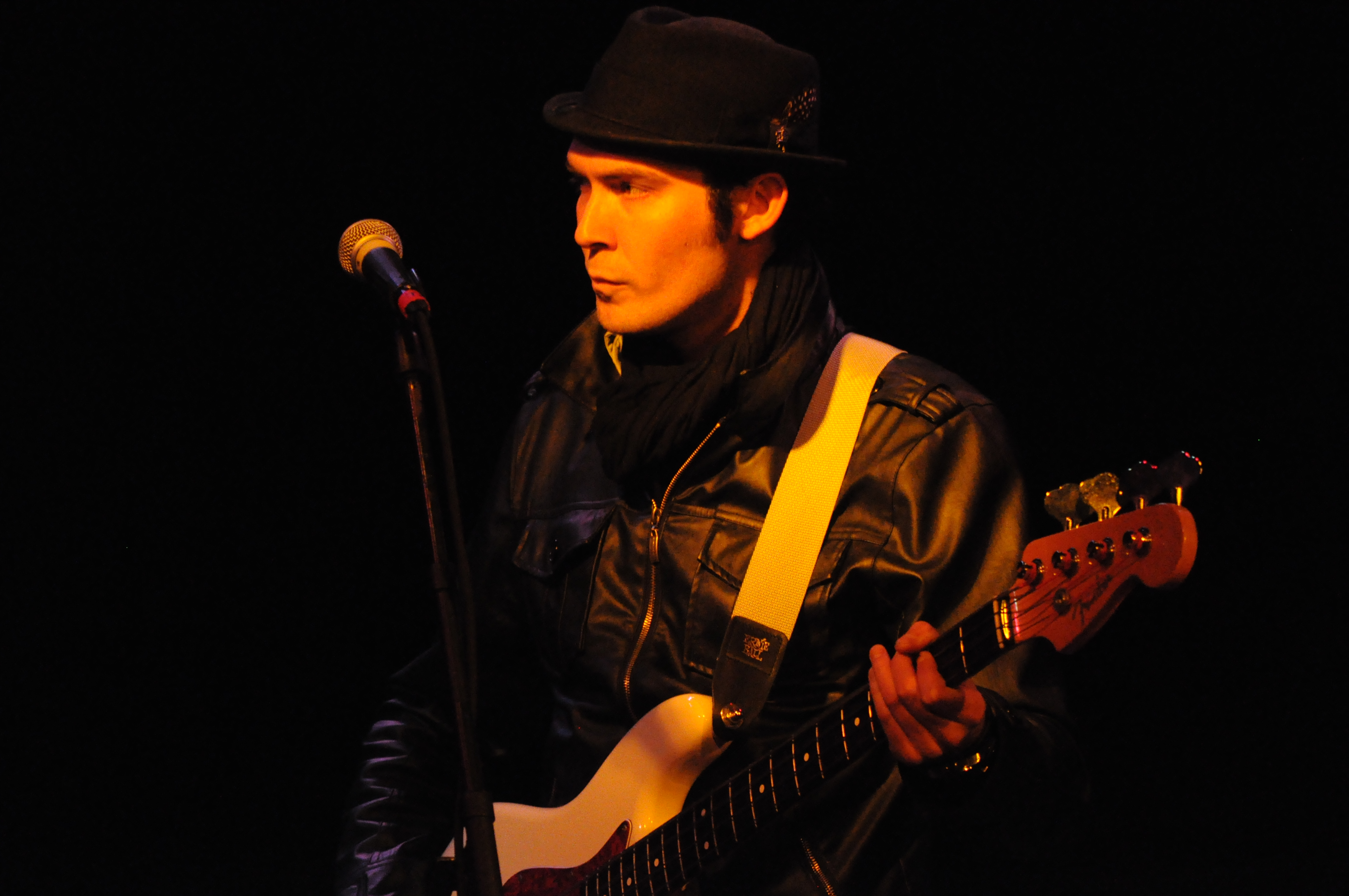
- Shane Tutmarc in 2011

Background information
- Born: September 25, 1981 (age 45)
- Years active: 1997–present
- Website: shanetutmarc.com

Shane Tutmarc (born September 25, 1981) is an American musician.

== Career ==
Tutmarc is the great-grandson of Paul Tutmarc, who has been credited as the inventor of the electric bass. His grandfather, Bud Tutmarc, was a well-known Hawaiian steel guitar player.

Tutmarc was the leader of Seattle band Dolour from 1997 to 2007. He has played in several other bands, including United State of Electronica, Shane Tutmarc & The Traveling Mercies, and Solar Twin. In June 2009, Tutmarc released his first solo album, Shouting at a Silent Sky. In January 2010, he re-located to Nashville, Tennessee. Several of his songs have been featured on television programs and films. In 2020, Tutmarc returned to Dolour as his main creative project.

Tutmarc has collaborated with several artists, including Gatsby's American Dream, Star Anna, Sean Nelson, Jessica Lea Mayfield, The Explorers Club, Elizabeth Cook.

== Discography ==
=== Urban Crush ===
- Self-titled EP Cassette (1997)

=== Dolour ===
- "The Shivering / That Dreadful Anthem (Single)" 7-inch (1998)
- "Waiting for a World War" (2001)
- "Iceland / The Ballad (Single)" 7-inch (2001)
- "Suburbiac" (2002)
- "CPR (EP)" (2003)
- "New Old Friends" (2004)
- "A Matter of Time: 2000-2005 (Compilation)" (2005)
- "The Years in the Wilderness (Album)" (2007)
- "The Royal We (Album)" (2020)
- "Televangelist (Album)" (2021)
- "Origin Story (Album)" (2021)
- "Daylight Upon Magic (Album)" (2024)
- "New Old Friends xx (Album) (2024)

=== Shane Tutmarc & The Traveling Mercies ===
- "I'm Gonna Live the Life I Sing About In My Song" (2007)
- "Hey Lazarus!" (2008)
- "Live On Air" (2019) - Bandcamp exclusive collection of radio performances

=== Solo ===
- "Shouting At A Silent Sky (Album)" (2009)
- "So Hard To Make An Easy Getaway" EP (2011)
- "Ride (Single)" (2013) Lana Del Rey cover
- "Portions for Foxes (Single)" (2013) Rilo Kiley cover
- "Aneurysm (Single)" (2013) Nirvana cover
- "Borrowed Trouble (Album)" (2014)
- "Poison Apple" EP (2015)
- "Busy Being Born Again (Compilation)" (2018) collection of home recorded covers from 2007-2009
- "Seattle Is Dying (Single)" (2019) - featured in the KOMO News documentary, Seattle is Dying
- "Dark Circles: The Shouting at a Silent Sky Demos (Compilation)" (2019) - BandCamp exclusive
- "A Brave New World (Single)" (2020)
- "Written & Produced by Shane Tutmarc (Compilation)" (2020) - featuring solo songs, plus Dolour and Solar Twin.

=== Solar Twin ===
- "Slow Motion (Single)" (2016)
- "Black Sky Revisited (Single)" (2016)
- "The Big Sleep (Single)" (2017)
- "Pink Noise (Album)" (2017)
- "I Would Die 4 U (Single)" (2018) Record Store Day cover of Prince song.
- "Hold On To This Moment (Single)" (2018)

== Collaborations and contributions ==
List of contributions to other artists, with notes
Year	Song(s)	Album	Artist	Notes	Reference
2001	"Interstellar Cattle Baron"	Bending Bus EP	Bending Bus	Lead vocals.	
2003	"N/A"	Emerald City EP	United State of Electronica	Co-writer, bass guitar, vocals.	
2004	"N/A"	Tomorrow's Taken	Ian McGlynn	Producer, multi-instrumentalist, vocal harmonies.	
2004	"N/A"	United State of Electronica	United State of Electronica	Co-writer, bass guitar, vocals.	
2005	"The Longest Wait"	A Pleasant Fiction	Izabelle	Vocal harmonies.	
2005	"N/A"	Life As A Spectator	Crosstide	Vocal harmonies.	
2005	"N/A"	There's Only One Side Tonight	Sameer Shukla	Producer, multi-instrumentalist, vocal harmonies.	
2005	"The Giant's Drink"	Volcano	Gatsby's American Dream	Co-writer, vocals.	
2006	"Daddy's Little Girl"	Get It	The Lashes	Co-writer (uncredited).	
2009	"N/A"	Unspeakable Things	Sirens Sister	Vocal harmonies.	
2012	"Hey Mr. Pharisee"	Hey Mr. Pharisee (Single)	Ethan Luck	Co-writer.	
2013	"Mean Kind of Love," "Let Me Be"	Go to Hell	Star Anna	Co-writer, acoustic guitar, vocals.	
2013	"The Drug Has a Voice"	Wounds & Fears EP	Ethan Luck	Co-writer.	
2014	"N/A"	Rattling the Cage EP	Patrick Kinsley	Producer, multi-instrumentalist, vocal harmonies.	
2014	"Crow"	Pure Delight	Red Jacket Mine	Vocals	
2015	"I Will Know Him," "Song in the Air," "The Sands of Time," "Once I Had a Glorious View," "Sweet Rivers of Redeeming Love," "The Sands of Time (Reprise)"	Sing My Welcome Home	Pacific Gold	Co-writer.	
2015	"She Says No. 1 (Come Back Home)," "Black Friday"	Love Me Down	Brian McSweeney	Co-writer.	
2015	"N/A"	Silver Bullet	Tanya Montana Coe	Producer, multi-instrumentalist, co-writer on "Let My Love," "Did I," and "You're Gonna Love Me"	
2015	"Tug of War"	Tug of War (Single)	Slings & Arrows	Co-writer	
2016	"That Was Me Then"	That Was Me Then (Single)	Slings & Arrows	Co-writer	
2017	"N/A"	Sea of Dust (EP)	Black Moon Mother	Producer	
2018	"Electric Blue"	Electric Blue (Single)	Tanya Montana Coe	Producer, co-writer, multi-instrumentalist, vocal harmonies	
2018	"Damned"	Damned (Single)	Tanya Montana Coe	Producer, co-writer, multi-instrumentalist, vocal harmonies, mix.	
2018	"One in a Million"	One in a Million (Single)	Tanya Montana Coe	Producer, multi-instrumentalist	
2018	"Simple Things," "Down Here Together in Heaven," "Where Do You Go," "Worlds Apart."	Mystical Realism (EP)	Damian Churchwell	Producer, multi-instrumentalist, vocal harmonies, mix and master.	
2018	"Quiet Time" & "Quiet Time (Solar Twin remix)"	Quiet Time 7"	Black Moon Mother	Producer, multi-instrumentalist, mix, and remix. Side A is original version produced by Tutmarc for 2017's Sea of Dust EP, Side B is a "Solar Twin" remix.	
2019	"N/A"	Hide Your Emotion	Tanya Montana Coe	Producer, Multi-Instrumentalist, Engineer, Mix, Co-writer on Electric Blue, Damned, Take It To The Top, What Makes It Go Away, and Hide Your Emotion, and sole-writer of My Heart's In Pieces.	
2019	"Viral Love"	Viral Love b/w Carlotta Valdez Goes to Texas 7"	Sean Nelson	Producer, Multi-Instrumentalist, Engineer, Mix for A-side, "Viral Love."	
2020	"Bumper Sticker"	Pop! Fights The Flames (benefit album for the people of Australia)	Sean Nelson	Producer, Multi-Instrumentalist, Engineer, Mix	
2020	"Shame on You"	Pop! Fights The Flames (benefit album for the people of Australia)	Tanya Montana Coe	Co-Producer, Multi-Instrumentalist, Engineer, Mix, Master	
2020	"You Don't Bother Me"	You Don't Bother Me: A Fundraiser For Ballard Ave Music Venues	The Nashville Quarenteens (aka Sean Nelson and Shane Tutmarc)	Additional lyrics, Producer, Multi-Instrumentalist, Engineer, Mix, Master	
2020	"N/A"	To Sing And Be Born Again	The Explorers Club	Co-producer, Vocal arrangements, vocal harmonies, Multi-instrumentalist, Engineer	
2020	"N/A"	s/t	The Explorers Club	Co-writer ("Dream World," "Dreamin'," "Somewhere Else," "Look to the Horizon"), Co-Producer, Vocal arrangements, Vocal harmonies, Multi-Instrumentalist, Engineer	
2020	"N/A"	Somebody Made For Me (Single)	The Explorers Club	Multi-instrumentalist, vocal harmonies, Engineer	
2021	"Be Young, Be Foolish, Be Happy"	Wattage	The Explorers Club	Multi-instrumentalist, vocal harmonies, Engineer	
2022	"Daddy Boyfriend," "Can You Feel It?"	Live at Paradise Garage	Jessica Lea Mayfield	Bass guitar	
2023	"Haunt You"	Self Care	Pacifico	engineer, vocal harmonies, keyboards, percussion	
2023	"Fake Love"	Warriors II	Jessica Lea Mayfield	Producer, Multi-Instrumentalist, Engineer	
2024	"Knock, Knock"	Knock, Knock (Single)	The Explorers Club	Co-writer	
2026	"N/A"	Pinkerton (Album)	Jessica Lea Mayfield x Dolour	Producer, Multi-Instrumentalist, Vocal Harmonies, Engineer	
"N/A" denotes contributions on all songs.
