= Phoenix (Pedro the Lion album) =

Studio album by Pedro the Lion
- Released: January 18, 2019
- Length: 45:05
- Label: Polyvinyl
- Producer: Andy D. Park

Pedro the Lion chronology
Achilles Heel (2004)	Phoenix (2019)	Havasu (2022)

Professional ratings
Aggregate scores
Source	Rating
AnyDecentMusic?	7.6/10
Metacritic	79/100
Review scores
Source	Rating
The 405	7.5/10
AllMusic	3.5/5 stars
Drowned in Sound	8/10
Paste	8/10
Pitchfork	7.6/10
PopMatters	8/10
Sputnikmusic	4/5 stars

Phoenix is the fifth studio album by American indie rock band Pedro the Lion. It was released on January 18, 2019, through Polyvinyl Record Co.

It was the first album released under the name Pedro the Lion since Achilles Heel, which was released in 2004, and serves as the first in an ongoing five installment autobiographical album cycle. Follow up albums about David's growing up years were released in 2022 with Havasu and 2024 with Santa Cruz.

== Track listing ==
No.	Title	Length
1.	"Sunrise"	1:01
2.	"Yellow Bike"	3:53
3.	"Clean Up"	2:49
4.	"Powerful Taboo"	3:29
5.	"Model Homes"	3:21
6.	"Piano Bench"	1:38
7.	"Circle K"	3:36
8.	"Quietest Friend"	4:23
9.	"Tracing the Grid"	3:16
10.	"Black Canyon"	5:23
11.	"My Phoenix"	3:24
12.	"All Seeing Eye"	2:42
13.	"Leaving the Valley"	6:09

== Charts ==
Chart	Peak position
US Heatseekers Albums (Billboard)	1
US Independent Albums (Billboard)	10
