= Pollens (band) =

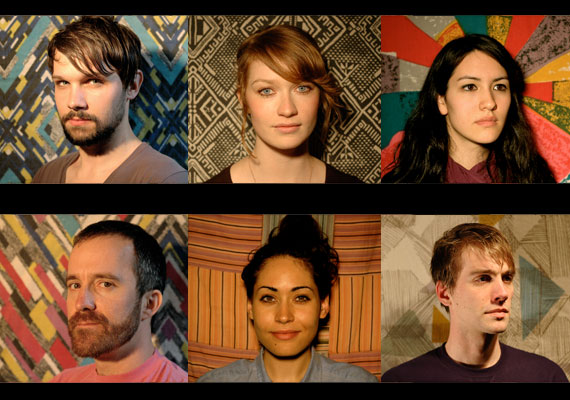

Background information
- Origin: Seattle, Washington, United States
- Genre: Indie rock
- Years active: 2008–present
- Members: Jeff Aaron Bryant; Elizabeth May
- Past members: Hanna Benn; Adam Kozie; Kelly Wyse; Whitney Lyman; Lena Simon; Mike Sparks
- Website: www.pollens.band

Pollens is an American indie rock band originally from Seattle, Washington, United States, and now based in New York City. Their sound has been described as a blend of trance, African rhythms, choral composition, and American Indie Rock.

Pollens began in late 2008 as the composition project of Jeff Aaron Bryant and Hanna Benn, students at Cornish College of the Arts in Seattle. As Bryant and Benn developed their sound in 2008 and 2009, live shows included drum machines and a rotating cast of vocalists, auxiliary instrumentalists and percussionists. Pollens' sound has often been compared to acclaimed Brooklyn band Dirty Projectors.

By early 2010 Pollens had expanded to become a six piece band. Other members include Adam Kozie, Kelly Wyse, Whitney Lyman, and Lena Simon. Reviewing a February, 2012 concert on Capitol Hill in Seattle, Andrew Matson of The Seattle Times wrote that "Trance is Pollens' strong suit. The clean, unique sound of its drones intensified to climaxes that sometimes came too soon... The best parts were when three female voices wove a pattern with drums, guitar and up to three synthesizers, establishing a thick layer of throbbing sound for extended periods of time."

The band became a seven piece with the addition of multi-instrumentalist Mike Sparks in 2013.

In an interview with Joe Williams of the Seattle Weekly, Benn explains that the song Helping Hand was adapted from music for a piano quartet she had previously written.

Pollens self-released an eponymous EP in 2010. Their album Brighten & Break, produced by Charlie Smith of Throw Me the Statue, was released in 2012 on Tapete Records. Morgan Henderson of Fleet Foxes contributed instrumentally to both recordings.

The group signed to German label Tapete Records in the Spring of 2012. In September 2013, they performed on the SoFar Sounds show in Seattle.

In 2015, Hanna Benn left Pollens, seeking to focus on her solo work, while co-founder Jeff Bryant relocated to New York City. Soon after his move, Bryant recruited Elizabeth May for the current duo line-up of Pollens. They released a new EP titled 'Mister Manufacture' on October 27, 2017.
