= Anna Fermin =

American musician

Anna Fermin is an American folk/country singer and songwriter.

== Anna Fermin, and Anna Fermin's Trigger Gospel ==
Anna Fermin was born in the Philippines but moved to Kenosha, Wisconsin with her family when she was a small child. Fermin attended art school in Chicago, Illinois, from 1989 and began playing acoustic guitar there. She has cited Steve Earle's song "Down the Road", which she later recorded, as an early inspiration. She briefly played in a band called Anaboy, then played solo locally.

Anna Fermin formed the new Chicago-based band Trigger Gospel, with Andon Davis (guitar), Michael Krayniak (double and electric basses) and Paul Bivans (drums). They named the band after the title of an old Western paperback novel, by Harry Sinclair Drago. The group opened for Johnny Cash at the House of Blues Chicago in one of their first gigs in 1996. Trigger Gospel self-released an EP in 1997. After they performed at SXSW in 1998, Lloyd Maines saw them and offered to produce their debut full-length album, Things to Come, which was released in 1999. 2002's Live Music, Vol. One was recorded at the Old Town School of Folk Music in Chicago. Jay Bennett produced 2003's Oh, the Stories We Hold. Trigger Gospel released Go in 2007.

Along the way, Rob Novak replaced Michael Krayniak on bass for a time in Trigger Gospel, after which Krayniak returned. Subsequently, Andon Davis left the band, but occasionally returned as a guest guitarist. After Davis's departure, several others alternated in the lead guitarist slot, including Frank Kvinge, Scott Ligon, John Rice, and Grant Tye. Ligon also sometimes played keyboards with the band. More recently, Alton Smith (keyboards) has also joined Trigger Gospel. Even more recently, Andon Davis rejoined Trigger Gospel as the regular lead guitarist.

In 2012 Fermin started moving in a new direction with a new band and a couple of EP releases. She worked on new material for a while, and was playing the new songs with a greater nod towards pop music, and shifted slightly away from her country/Americana roots. Live, she still was playing some of her older songs with the new band.

In July - August 2012 Fermin, along with guitarist John Rice, appeared in renowned Chicago artist Tony Fitzpatrick's autobiographical play, "Nickel History: The Nation of Heat", at the Steppenwolf Garage Theatre in Chicago, and in its 2014 sequel "The Midnight City", also at the Steppenwolf.

Circa 2014, Fermin reactivated Anna Fermin's Trigger Gospel, and the band started performing again in concerts in the Chicago area, and elsewhere in the Midwest, through 2016 and into 2017. And, a Trigger Gospel "trio" of Fermin, Davis, and Krayniak, toured Sweden in August 2016. In November 2016 Anna Fermin & Trigger Gospel released their new album: "You Belong Here", with cover art by Tony Fitzpatrick.

Circa 2021, Fermin moved to Portugal, but returns occasionally, through at least 2025, to the Chicago and Kenosha areas to visit and perform, sometimes with Trigger Gospel.

Circa 2015 through 2021 at least, Andon Davis, Paul Bivans, and Michael Krayniak continue to perform in the Chicago area as the Andon Davis Trio, and also together in larger bands including Bunkertown, Cannonball, and the Naomi Ashley Band.

== Discography ==
=== Anna Fermin's Trigger Gospel ===
- Trigger Gospel EP (self-released, 1997)
- Things to Come (Sighlow, 1999)
- on compilation album Down to the Promised Land: 5 Years of Bloodshot Records (Bloodshot Records, 2000) - "Oh Lonesome Me" (by Don Gibson)
- Live Music, Vol. One (2002)
- Oh, the Stories We Hold (Undertow Music, 2003)
- on compilation album For Anyone That's Listening: A Tribute To Uncle Tupelo (Flat Earth Records, 2003) - "Graveyard Shift" (by Jay Farrar, Jeff Tweedy, and Mike Heidorn)
- Go (Sighlow, 2007)
- You Belong Here (self-released, 2016)

=== Anna Fermin ===
- Awaken to a New Earth single (Monkey Bread Music, 2008)
- The Contender EP (Monkey Bread Music/Pink Room Records, 2009 - re-released 2012)
- Someday Afternoon EP (Monkey Bread Music/Pink Room Records, 2012)
