= Blake Wescott =

Blake Wescott is a musician from Seattle, Washington, who was formerly lead guitarist for David Bazan's band.

Often noted as a drummer for Pedro the Lion, and for his co-writing, production, backing vocals, and multiple instrumentation on former Velocity Girl singer Sarah Shannon's first solo record.

Lead singer of the defunct late-1990s alternative band Bloomsday.

He played guitar and sings backing vocals on records by Saltine, Damien Jurado, Aaron Sprinkle, Seldom (which he also produced), Dolour, Cush, Rocky Votolato, The Long Winters, Denison Witmer, Magneto, and others.

Wescott has toured as a backing musician for Crystal Skulls.

Additionally, he owned Casa Recording Company, which has put out the albums by The Posies, Sarah Shannon, Seldom, and others.
