= Suburbiac =

Studio album by Dolour
- Released: October 29, 2002
- Recorded: September 2001 – June 2002
- Genre: Indie pop
- Label: Fugitive Records
- Producer: Aaron Sprinkle and Shane Tutmarc

Dolour chronology
Waiting for a World War (2001)	Suburbiac (2002)	New Old Friends (2004)

Professional ratings
Review scores
Source	Rating
Allmusic	3/5 stars

Suburbiac is the second album released by indie rock band Dolour. It was released on October 29, 2002. The album was produced by Aaron Sprinkle and Shane Tutmarc.

== Track listing ==
All songs by Shane Tutmarc (BMI)

1. "Menage a Trois"
2. "Suburbiac"
3. "So Done with You"
4. "A Billion Odd People"
5. "Iceland"
6. "Get Yourself Together"
7. "Highway Hypnosis"
8. "Rest Your Head"
9. "Chasing the Wrong Girl Home"
10. "Baggage"
11. "Too Old for Fantasy"

== Musicians ==
- Shane Tutmarc - vocals, guitar, piano, synth, bass; drums (tracks 3, 4, 10)
- Aaron Sprinkle - guitar, synth, drum loops, vocals
- Phil Peterson - cello, string bass, trumpet, vocals
- Joey Sanchez - drums (tracks 1, 5)
- Noah Weaver - synth (track 3)
- Kevin Barrans - theremin (track 4)
- Paul Mumaw - drums (tracks 6, 9, 11)
- Jason Holstrom - saxophone (track 9)
- Peter Sali - mandolin (track 11)
