= U.S.E. (album) =

Studio album by United State of Electronica
- Released: March 15, 2005 (US)
- Genre: Alternative rock, electronica, indie rock
- Length: 49:57
- Label: Sonic Boom
- Producer: Jason Holstrom and U.S.E.

United State of Electronica chronology
Emerald City 12" (2003)	U.S.E. (2005)	Party People EP (2005)

Professional ratings
Review scores
Source	Rating
Pitchfork Media	(7.5/10)
Rolling Stone	3/5 stars

U.S.E. is a 2004 album by United State of Electronica. It was produced, recorded, and mixed by Jason Holstrom and U.S.E.

== Track listing ==
1. "IT IS ON!"
2. "Emerald City"
3. "Climb the Walls (Umbrella of Love)"
4. "All Sounds & All People"
5. "Open Your Eyes"
6. "Takin' it All the Way"
7. "...City of Stars"
8. "Night Shift"
9. "There's Always Music"
10. "Vamos a la Playa"
11. "...The Chase"
12. "La Discoteca"
