= I Sold Gold =

Studio album by Aqueduct
- Released: January 25, 2005
- Studio: Various locations in Oklahoma and Seattle, Washington; The Lonely Mansion (Tulsa, Oklahoma); The Purple Door (Seattle, WA); The Echo Lab (Denton, Texas)
- Genre: Indie pop, lo-fi
- Length: 37:00
- Label: Barsuk Records
- Producer: Aqueduct

Aqueduct chronology
Pistols at Dawn (2004)	I Sold Gold (2005)	Or Give Me Death (2007)

Professional ratings
Aggregate scores
Source	Rating
Metacritic	75/100 link
Review scores
Source	Rating
E! Online	(B+) Archived April 30, 2005, at archive.today
IGN	(7.0/10) 28 Jan 05
Pitchfork Media	(6.8/10) 27 Jan 05

I Sold Gold is the second album by American indie-pop band Aqueduct. It was released January 25, 2005 on Barsuk Records. Two tracks, "Growing Up With GNR" and "Heart Design", released with I Sold Gold come from Aqueduct's first album, Power Ballads, which was released in 2003. The album was located in located in various locations and studios in Oklahoma and Seattle, Washington, with additional recording and all mixing done at Echo Lab in Denton, Texas with Matt Pence. The album has been described as the fusion of drum beat, synthpop, and piano which has led some to make comparisons with The Flaming Lips, Modest Mouse, and Frank Black.

In 2016, the album was remastered on gold and black vinyl as part of frontman David Terry's attempt to release the band's entire discography on vinyl.

== Track listing ==
1. "The Suggestion Box" – 2:19
2. "Hardcore Days & Softcore Nights" – 3:53
3. "Growing Up With GNR" – 3:29
4. "Heart Design" – 3:34
5. "Five Star Day" – 3:32
6. "Tension" – 2:58
7. "The Unspeakable" – 4:14
8. "Frantic (Roman Polański Version)" – 3:04
9. "Laundry Baskets" – 5:01
10. "Game Over: Thanks for Playing" – 2:29
11. "The Tulsa Trap" – 2:41

== Personnel ==
Taken from the album's liner notes, with all tracks written by David Terry.

Aqueduct

- David Terry - Vocals, Keyboards, Guitar, Bass, Programming, Writing

Additional Personnel

- Andrew Rudd - Drums on Tracks 3 and 4
- James McAlister- Drums on Track 5
- Jason Holstrom - Guitar on Track 3
- Matt Pence - Drums on Tracks 2, 7, 9, and 11

Technical Personnel

- Matt Pence - Engineer, Mixer
- Jason Holstrom - Engineering, Mixer
- Aqueduct - Engineering, Mixer, Producer
- Ed Brooks - Mastering
- Thom Johnson - Illustrations
