= Wonderful (band) =

- Origin: Seattle, Washington
- Genres: Dream pop
- Years active: 1999–present
- Members: Jason Holstrom; Jon e. Rock; Peter Sali; Noah Star Weaver

Wonderful is a Seattle, Washington band formed in 1999.

== History ==
Wonderful's 2001 debut EP, Welcome to Wonderful, was recorded and produced by Ryan Hadlock at Bear Creek Studio in Woodinville, Washington. Wonderful's first full-length album, God Bless Our Pad, was self produced and released in 2003. In 2011 Wonderful released their second full length Wake Up to Dreamland which featured the song "Rainbow Colors."

In 2002, the members of Wonderful created the dance band U.S.E. (United State of Electronica) and would remain active with both bands.

== Band members ==
- Jason Holstrom
- Jon e. Rock
- Peter Sali
- Noah Star Weaver

== Discography ==
EPs

- Welcome to Wonderful (2001)

Studio albums

- God Bless Our Pad (2003)
- Wake Up to Dreamland (2011)
