= The Paper Hearts =

American indie rock band (2001-2004)

- Origin: Fayetteville, Arkansas, U.S.
- Genres: Indie rock
- Years active: 2001–2004
- Label: Heartshape
- Members: Todd Gill; Aaron Weidner; Michelle Hedegard; Bryan Brown; Andrew Rudd; Dustin Bartholomew
- Past members: Tim Campbell; Jason Rich; Damon Singleton

The Paper Hearts is an American indie rock band that was formed in Fayetteville, Arkansas in 2001 by Todd Gill (Lucero, The Good Fear) and Aaron Weidner (The New Tragedies).

After coming up with a few songs, Michelle Hedegard was brought in as a third singer/songwriter. Bryan Brown (Woods Afire) was added on bass and Andrew Rudd (Aqueduct) on drums. A self-titled EP was released within a year on Clunk Records and a tiring run of out-of-town shows followed. A strong following of fans all over the Southeast was the fuel for the writing/recording of the full-length Plans for the Past which was released on the band's own Heartshape Records label.

Shortly after the release of Plans for the Past, Gill left the band to join Lucero, placing The Paper Hearts on a temporary hiatus. During the break, Weidner moved to Kansas City and formed The New Tragedies. Rudd relocated to Seattle and joined Aqueduct while Brown and Hedegard founded Woods Afire and Echoesbleeding, respectively.

In January 2004, Gill left Lucero and returned to Fayetteville to reform The Paper Hearts. Dustin Bartholomew (Skirt, The Good Fear) replaced Weidner while Tim Campbell (All American Rejects, Skirt) replaced Rudd. Jason Rich (The New Amsterdams) was also added on lapsteel guitar.

== Discography ==
Year	Title
2001	The Paper Hearts (EP)
2003	Plans for the Past
2004	Hard to Smile
