= Earphone (disambiguation) =

An earphone is a small headphone that fits in the outer ear.

Earphone(s) may also refer to:

- Earphones (band), an idol group
- Earphone Award, a list of awards bestowed by AudioFile
- Apple earphones, produced by Apple Inc.

== See also ==
- Headphones (disambiguation)
