= Tim Walsh (musician) =

American singer-songwriter (born 1975)

Timothy William "TW" Walsh (born January 26, 1975, in Melrose, Massachusetts, United States) is an American songwriter, multi-instrumentalist, record producer, mixing engineer, and mastering engineer. He holds a B.S. in Computer Science from Northeastern University.

== Career ==
In August 2003, Walsh officially joined Pedro the Lion, led by David Bazan. He had been occasionally been playing live with the band and contributing to recordings since 2000. The two would also collaborate on Bazan's Headphones project. Walsh was, aside from Bazan, the only other official member of Pedro the Lion, and was heavily involved in the recording of Pedro the Lion's Achilles Heel. Citing personal and financial reasons, Walsh left both projects in late 2005, after which Bazan retired the Pedro the Lion moniker. In 2009 Walsh mixed and mastered Bazan's Curse Your Branches album, and has worked on several Bazan releases since.

After Pedro the Lion Walsh formed the Soft Drugs, featuring percussionist Jason Cammarata, bass player Ken Maiuri, guitar player Michael Murray, and guitar and keyboard player John Beck of Emergency Music. The band released two EPs, In Moderation (2006) and Get Back – Side A (2008). The nine songs from the two EPs were later reissued on a single album, The Soft Drugs, released in 2013.

Walsh has released six solo albums since 1999, and a handful of EPs and singles.

Walsh also provided musical, mastering and production assistance for other artists, including Sufjan Stevens—for whom he mastered All Delighted People, Planetarium, Carrie and Lowell Live and The Age of Adz—Starflyer 59, Ben Gibbard, Nathaniel Rateliff, Damien Jurado, Cold War Kids, Clap Your Hands Say Yeah, The Shins, Kristin Hersh, and nearly 1,000 others.

Walsh formed a new band called Lo Tom with longtime friends David Bazan, Jason Martin (of Starflyer 59), and Trey Many. They released their debut record on Barsuk in July 2017.

== Discography ==
=== Albums ===
- How We Spend Our Days (1999)
- Blue Laws (2001)
- Songs of Pain and Leisure (2011)
- Fruitless Research (2016)
- Terrible Freedom (2017)
- Wilderness (2024)

=== Extended plays ===
- Pollensongs (2002)
- Daylight (2022)

=== With the Soft Drugs ===
- In Moderation (2006)
- Get Back - Side A (2008)
- The Soft Drugs (2013)
