= Throw Me the Statue =

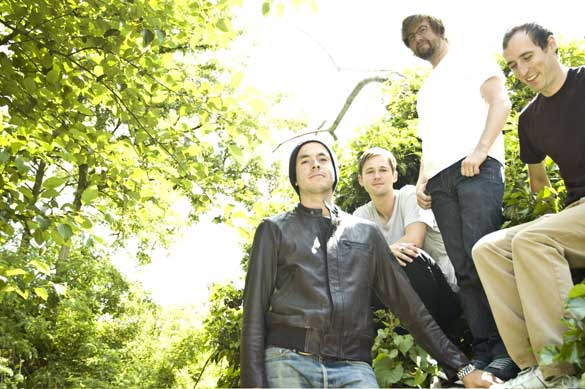

Background information
- Origin: Seattle, Washington, U.S.
- Genre: Indie pop
- Years active: 2005–2013
- Label: Secretly Canadian
- Website: throwmethestatue.com

Throw Me the Statue was an American indie pop band.

== Biography ==
Throw Me the Statue was formed by Scott Reitherman after he began self-releasing CDs in 2004. Friends, including Pedro the Lion member Casey Foubert, pitched in to help as Reitherman added instruments including drum machines and glockenspiels to round out his sound. A full band came into shape in early 2007 as Throw Me the Statue's debut album Moonbeams was released on Reitherman's Baskerville Hill label and later on Secretly Canadian. They have been featured on Pitchfork and NPR and have received airplay on the independent Seattle radio station KEXP-FM.

Moonbeams made it to No. 16 of 100 on the Amazon Music Best of 2008 Editors Picks list. The single "Lolita" was used in Courtyard by Marriott's "New Lobby" television commercial. In 2008, they recorded a version of Huey Lewis and the News's song, "If This Is It", for a Huey Lewis tribute album. Their second album, Creaturesque, was released in August 2009. During the making of the record, Throw Me the Statue listened to 1980s artists such as Phil Collins, OMD, and Jermaine Stewart. Paste magazine rated it a 7.9 out of 10, calling the songs "unabashedly infectious."

In 2008 Throw Me the Statue toured the U.S., performed at South by Southwest, Bumbershoot, the Sasquatch Festival, and opened for Cake in Seattle. The band toured North America with The Brunettes in 2009.

== Discography ==
=== Albums ===
- Moonbeams (CD) - Baskerville Hill - 2007
- Moonbeams (re-release) (CD) - Secretly Canadian - 2008
- Creaturesque (CD/LP) - Secretly Canadian - 2009

=== EPs ===
- Purpleface (CD) - Secretly Canadian - 2009

=== Singles ===
- "About to Walk" (CD) - Baskerville Hill - 2007
- "Lolita" (7"/CD) - Secretly Canadian - 2008
