= Loveworld =

LOVEWORLD

Studio album by United State of Electronica
- Released: 20 October 2009
- Genres: Electronic rock, dance-rock
- Length: 53:12
- Label: Mannheim
- Producers: United State of Electronica and Cameron Nicklaus

LOVEWORLD is an album by the American dance party band United State of Electronica (U.S.E.). It was recorded in Seattle at Avast! Recording Company with engineer Cameron Nicklaus and with U.S.E at the Cabana.

== Track listing ==
1. "Dance With Me"
2. "River Of Love"
3. "Get That Feeling"
4. "Helping Hand"
5. "Beat Of My Heart"
6. "We The People"
7. "K.I.S.S.I.N.G"
8. "Party People"
9. "Look At The City"
10. "What We Fightin' 4"
11. "All The World"
12. "U.R.U.S.E"

== Reception ==
Michaelangelo Matos of The A.V. Club rated it B+ and wrote that, compared to the band's first album, it "mines the same seam, though a bit less consistently". Matthew Perpetua of Pitchfork Media rated it 6.3/10 stars and wrote, "LOVEWORLD is an album overflowing with sweetness and joy, but it is rather short on depth." Barry Walters of Spin rated it 8/10 stars and wrote that the band "just won't allow you to mope".
