= New Old Friends =

Studio album by Dolour
- Released: November 2, 2004
- Recorded: May 2002 – Oct 2003
- Genre: Indie pop
- Label: Made In Mexico Records
- Producer: Shane Tutmarc

Dolour chronology
Suburbiac (2002)	New Old Friends (2004)	A Matter of Time: 2000-2005 (2005)

Professional ratings
Review scores
Source	Rating
Allmusic	link
Three Imaginary Girls	#3 on Top 50 NW Albums of 2004 link
The Stranger	link
Seattle Weekly	#3 on Best Albums of 2004 link

New Old Friends is the third album by the indie rock band Dolour. It was produced by Shane Tutmarc. It was mixed by Jason Holstrom and Shane Tutmarc.

== Track listing ==
1. “I Smell a Lawsuit”
2. “You Can't Make New Old Friends”
3. “Cheer Up Baby”
4. “Next 2 U”
5. “Butter Knife Suicide”
6. “Before Tonight's Big Party”
7. “CPR”
8. “Behind the Melody”
9. “What If?”
10. “Candy”
11. “My Paranoid Mind”
12. “Running Forever”
13. “October 29th”

== Recording details ==
The songs on the album were initially demos that Tutmarc made for Suburbiac's producer Aaron Sprinkle to comment on for a follow-up on Fugitive Records. Fugitive ceased operating and Tutmarc wrote songs about his growing dislike of the music business, including, "I Smell A Lawsuit," "Cheer Up Baby," "My Paranoid Mind," "What If", and "Behind the Melody" (sung by Jason Holstrom).

== Release details ==
New Old Friends was released independently in February 2004, with different artwork. The album was eventually picked up by Seattle indie label Made In Mexico Records and rereleased in November 2004 with a new layout and artwork by Shane's brother Brandon. The album was reviewed by The Seattle Times, The Stranger, KEXP, and AllMusic.com.

== New Old Friends tour ==
Tutmarc and band (including future Fleet Foxes leader Robin Pecknold on bass), undertook their first US tour in Spring 2005.

== Musicians ==
- Craig Curran - bass
- Jason Holstrom - saxophone, ukulele, vocals
- Eric Howk - lead and rhythm guitar
- Sugar McGuinn - bass, percussion
- Paul Mumaw - drums on "You Can't Make New Old Friends," "Next 2 U," "Candy," and "October 29th"
- Phil Peterson - cello, string bass, trumpet, violin, synth, vocals, etc.
- Jon E Rock - percussion
- Joey Sanchez - drums on "I Smell A Lawsuit" and "Butter Knife Suicide"
- Jesse Sprinkle - drums on "Cheer Up Baby" and "CPR"
- Shane Tutmarc - vocals, piano, guitar, synth, bass, programming, percussion
- Noah Weaver - piano

== Multiple releases ==
New Old Friends was originally self-released on February 17, 2004 with different album artwork by Brandon Tutmarc.

== 20th Anniversary Re-Recording ==
In late 2024, Tutmarc returned to the material for the 20th anniversary with "New Old Friends xx," a start-to-finish new interpretation of the album recorded in a one-man-band fashion. "New Old Friends xx" includes lyrical and musical changes throughout the album. Tutmarc shared this on his website, "New Old Friends was the album where I declared my independence and began the journey I continue on today – as a self-contained, self-produced, independent artist. It’s the album where I chose to step out of the machine and make music I wanted to make for myself. While there were many feels returning to this early music of mine, I also brought my whole last 20 years of life with me into the songs."
