= Fewer Moving Parts =

EP by David Bazan
- Released: 13 June 2006
- Recorded: 2005–2006
- Genre: Indie rock
- Length: 34:18
- Label: Eat My Flesh, Drink My Blood; Barsuk Records
- Producer: David Bazan

David Bazan chronology
Fewer Moving Parts (2006)	Curse Your Branches (2009)

Professional ratings
Review scores
Source	Rating
Pitchfork Media	(5/10)
Allmusic	4/5 stars
Robert Christgau	(dud)

Fewer Moving Parts is David Bazan's debut EP, released in limited quantities on June 13, 2006. It was re-released on 22 May 2007 on Barsuk Records.

The EP was considered a stopgap release to tide fans over until his full-length solo debut. While officially an EP, Fewer Moving Parts is longer — in total tracks or in runtime — than some albums.

The EP features five songs in two forms: first with full instrumentation, then stripped-down acoustic. In its first incarnation, "Backwoods Nation" was a Pedro the Lion b-side, featured on the 2002 Jade Tree compilation Location is Everything, Volume 1. "Cold Beer and Cigarettes", originally known by its alternate title, "The Devil is Beating His Wife", came to light as a 2005 Pedro the Lion demo recording. It was originally slated to be on their now abandoned fifth full-length album, but was re-recorded for Fewer Moving Parts.

== Track listing ==
All songs written by David Bazan

1. "Selling Advertising" – 3:08
  alternate title: "Making It, Faking It, Breaking It"
2. "How I Remember" – 3:13
  alternate title: "Don't Cry, I'm Not Gonna Hurt You"
3. "Fewer Broken Pieces" – 3:23
  alternate title: "Cake and Eat It, Too"
4. "Cold Beer and Cigarettes" – 3:51
  alternate title: "The Devil is Beating His Wife"
5. "Backwoods Nation" – 4:10
  alternate title: "Speeding the Collapse"
6. "Selling Advertising (acoustic)" – 2:48
7. "How I Remember (acoustic)" – 3:17
8. "Fewer Broken Pieces (acoustic)" – 3:23
9. "Cold Beer and Cigarettes (acoustic)" – 3:52
10. "Backwoods Nation (acoustic)" – 3:12

== Personnel ==
- David Bazan – vocals, instruments, recording, and mixing
- Zak Sally – artwork
