= Or Give Me Death (album) =

Studio album by Aqueduct
- Released: February 20, 2007
- Genre: Indie
- Label: Barsuk
- Producer: Aqueduct, Jason Holstrom

Aqueduct chronology
I Sold Gold (2005)	Or Give Me Death (2007)	Wild Knights (2015)

Professional ratings
Aggregate scores
Source	Rating
Metacritic	71/100
Review scores
Source	Rating
AllMusic	4/5 stars
AbsolutePunk.net	(84%)
IGN	(9.2/10)
Pitchfork Media	(5.8/10)
PopMatters	8/10 stars

Or Give Me Death is an album by Aqueduct. It was released on February 20, 2007, by Barsuk Records.

== Track listing ==
1. "Lying in the Bed I've Made"
2. "Living a Lie"
3. "Broken Records"
4. "Keep It Together"
5. "Just the Way I Are"
6. "Unavailable"
7. "Split the Difference"
8. "As You Wish"
9. "Zero the Controls"
10. "Wasted Energy"
11. "You'll Get Yours"
12. "With Friends Like These"
