= Pistols at Dawn (EP) =

Pistols At Dawn

EP by Aqueduct
- Released: October 12, 2004
- Studio: The Lonely Mansion (Tulsa, Oklahoma); The Purple Door (Seattle, WA); The Echo Lab (Denton, Texas)
- Genre: Indie pop, Lo-Fi
- Label: Barsuk Records

Aqueduct chronology
Power Ballads (2003)	Pistols At Dawn (2004)	I Sold Gold (2005)

Pistols at Dawn is the first EP by American indie pop band Aqueduct. The five-song EP was released October 12, 2004 on Barsuk Records, the groups first release on the label.

== Track listing ==
1. "Hardcore Days & Softcore Nights" – 3:53
2. "Dinner Mints"
3. "As Close As Your Girlfriend Is Far Away"
4. "Tension (Piano Verite)"
5. "Who Wanna Rock?"

== Personnel ==
Adapted from the EP's booklet.

Aqueduct

- David Terry - Vocals, Keyboards, Programming

Additional Personnel

- Matt Pence - Drums
- Andrew Rudd - Drums
- Matthew Nadar - Guitar
- Brian Brewer - Lapsteel
- Jason Holstrom - Guitar
