= Strange Negotiations =

Studio album by David Bazan
- Released: May 24, 2011
- Recorded: November–December 2010
- Studios: Bazan's home studio, Seattle, Washington, United States
- Genre: Indie rock
- Language: English
- Label: Barsuk

David Bazan chronology
Live at Electrical Audio (2010)	Strange Negotiations (2011)	Blanco (2016)

Strange Negotiations is David Bazan's second full-length studio album, released on 24 May 2011. Recording commenced in early November 2010 and was funded by pre-order purchases.

The album peaked at #32 on the Billboard Top Rock Album chart.

In 2019, a documentary with the same name, Strange Negotiations, was released, directed by Brandon Vedder. The film catalogs the inner battles faced by Bazan, in both spiritual and artistic contexts, occurring during religious debate in the United States spurred by the 2016 presidential election.

== Track listing ==
All songs written by David Bazan, except "Eating Paper" and "Messes" (words by David Bazan; music by Jason Martin and David Bazan).

1. "Wolves at the Door"
2. "Level with Yourself"
3. "Future Past"
4. "People"
5. "Virginia"
6. "Eating Paper"
7. "Messes"
8. "Don't Change"
9. "Strange Negotiations"
10. "Won't Let Go"

== Reception ==
The album was covered on NPR's All Things Considered. The A.V. Club gave the album a grade of "B," while Paste rated it at 8.4.
