= Power Balladz =

American live comedy performance

- Official Power Balladz Logo
- Music: Various
- Lyrics: Various
- Basis: Rock music of the 70s, 80s & 90s
- Productions: 2002 Minneapolis; 2009 Minneapolis Premiere; 2010 Off-Broadway

Power Balladz is a live comedy performance featuring a mixture of comedy, trivia, and iconic rock n' roll songs from the 70s, 80s & 90s for which it is also named. Created by Mike Todaro and Dan Nycklemoe with Peter Rothstein, Power Balladz began its initial theatrical run at the LAB Theatre in Minneapolis and then made its New York debut on August 5, 2010 with an opening night of August 19, 2010. The comedy's musical blend includes songs by Journey, Queen, Scorpions, Poison, Aerosmith, Bon Jovi, Night Ranger, Styx, Heart, and more.

== Creation ==
The Power Balladz were originally written and performed in 2002 at the Bryant Lake Bowl in Minneapolis, Power Balladz predates the show to which it is most commonly compared to today, Rock of Ages. The first-ever production of Power Balladz originally featured creators Dan Nycklemoe and Mike Todaro playing the leads.

== Synopsis ==
Lacking a true narrative, the production resembles a comical lecture on the rise and fall of the Power Ballad as a musical form, and uses key songs to illustrate points about the art form's style, structure, lyrical content, and more. Guiding the audience through the experience are two self-professed rock aficionados Dieter and Scott. Throughout the show, Dieter and Scott poll the audience for answers to trivia questions, fire off a T-shirt cannon, and lead a live band in recreating the iconic musical hits the show celebrates. In what could be construed as the one true instance of plot in the show, the high school sweetheart of Dieter appears midway through and joins the cast for the remainder of the show, with Dieter attempting to muster up the courage he never had way back when.

== Cast ==
Role	Current New York Off-Broadway Cast	Current Understudy
Dieter	Dieter Bierbrauer	Peter James Zielinski
Scott	Scott Richard Foster	Peter James Zielinski
Mary	Mary Mossberg	Melanie Kann

== Featured Music ==
- "Sweet Child o' Mine" - Guns N' Roses
- "Sister Christian" - Night Ranger
- "Here I Go Again" - Whitesnake
- "Faithfully" - Journey
- "Wanted Dead or Alive" - Bon Jovi
- "Wind of Change" - Scorpions
- "Every Rose Has Its Thorn" - Poison
- "Close My Eyes Forever" - Ozzy Osbourne and Lita Ford
- "Come Sail Away" - Styx
- "Power Balladz Medley" - Cast
- "Alone" - Heart
- "Dream On" - Aerosmith
- "Home Sweet Home" - Mötley Crüe
- "We are the Champions" - Queen
- "Paradise City" - Guns N' Roses

== Critical reception ==
After a critically successful reception Off Broadway in 2010 Power Balladz was slightly modified. Power Balladz Sing-A-Long will begin touring in the fall of 2012.
