= The Explorers Club (band) =

American pop rock band

- Origin: Charleston, South Carolina, United States
- Genres: Pop rock, rock and roll, surf rock, pop
- Years active: 2005 – present
- Labels: Dead Oceans, Rock Ridge Music
- Members: Jason Brewer
- Past members: Wyatt Funderburk; Paul Runyon; Kyle Polk; Michael Williamson; Wally Reddington; David Ellis; James Faust; Justin James; Neil Thomas; Stefan Rogenmoser; Trey Cooper; Nathan Hussey; Chris Mondia
- Website: https://theexplorersclub.com/, https://www.facebook.com/theexplorersclub

The Explorers Club are an American pop-rock band originally from the coast of South Carolina, United States. They feature a rotating cast of musicians led by Jason Brewer, whose debut album was released by Dead Oceans. The music of their first album is heavily influenced by the vocal harmony styles and production of the Beach Boys. They are also influenced by classic rock and roll arrangements as made popular by the Beatles, Chuck Berry, Phil Spector, the Zombies, the Monkees and the Byrds. Their second album shows more influences of soft-pop artists of the early-1970s such as Burt Bacharach, Glen Campbell, etc. The band relocated to Nashville, Tenn. in 2014 and released their third studio album 'Together' on 24 June 2016. On 12 June 2020 they released the self-titled album 'The Explorers Club' and an album of covers titled 'To Sing and Be Born Again' on Goldstar Recordings.

== History ==
The Explorers Club was formed in Charleston, South Carolina in 2005. The group signed with indie record label Dead Oceans in June 2007 and released their debut album in 2008. Their first single, "Do You Love Me?", was released in April of that year. The Explorers Club's music has been featured on TV shows such as The O.C., How I Met Your Mother, and Bored to Death. Several members of The Explorers Club were previously in a band called Nineteen Eighty-Four. To promote the February 2012 release of Grand Hotel, the band released three free EPs called "suites", each containing a cover and two preliminary mixes of tracks set to appear on the album. The final mixes for the album were done by Mark Linett, who is known for his work with The Beach Boys. In 2014 and 2015, the band recorded their third studio album, Together, at Reel Recording in Nashville, Tenn. The album featured members of Brian Wilson's band, Nelson Bragg, Probyn Gregory, Scott Bennett, and Darian Sahanaja, and was co-produced by Jason Brewer, Mark Galup, and Erik Thompson. Together was released on 24 June 2016.

== Discography ==
=== Albums ===
- Freedom Wind - Dead Oceans, 2008
- Grand Hotel - Rock Ridge Music, 2012
- Together - Goldstar Recordings, 2016
- The Explorers Club - Goldstar Recordings, 2020
- To Sing and Be Born Again - Goldstar Recordings, 2020
- Wattage - Goldstar Recordings, 2022

=== EPs ===
- The Explorers Club - self-released, iTunes, 2006
- The Californian Suite - Rock Ridge Music, 2011
- The Carolinian Suite - Rock Ridge Music, 2011
- The New Yorker Suite - Rock Ridge Music, 2011
- All Aboard: Live at Patriots Point, 2015

=== Singles ===
- Do You Love Me? / Carry Me - Dead Oceans, 2008
- In 2012 the band recorded a version of Don't Pull Your Love for a fund raising cd titled "Super Hits of the Seventies" for radio station WFMU.
- No Good to Cry, 2012
- Don't Waste Her Time, Burger Records, 2013
- Christmas Must Be Tonight, 2013
- We've Only Just Begun, 2014
- The Sun Ain't Gonna Shine Anymore, 2019
- Forever - 2023, 2023
- Knock, Knock, 2024

== Press ==
- Spin online: Artist of the Day 03.07.08 .
