= Dolour =

American band

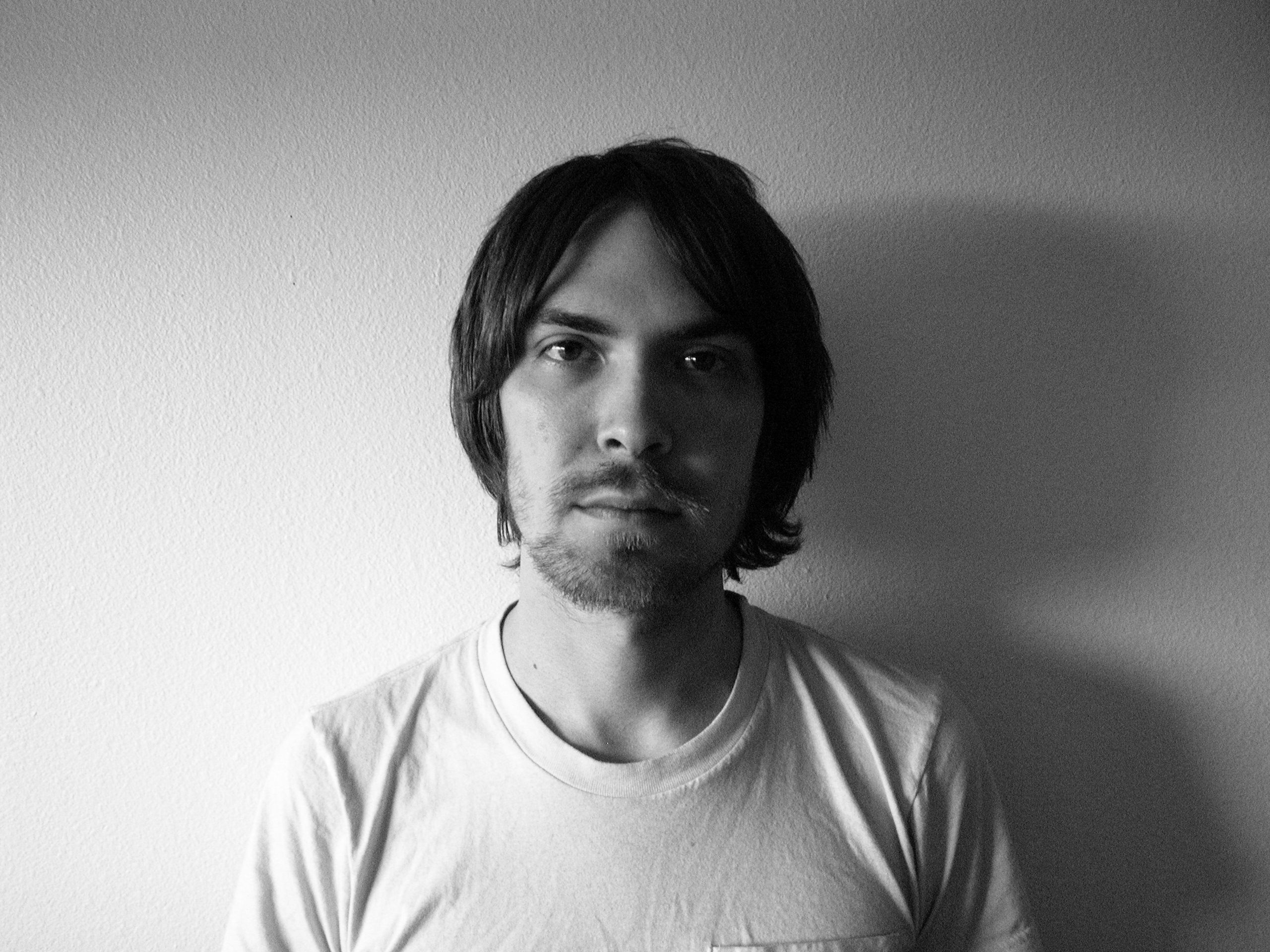
- Shane Tutmarc

Background information
- Origin: Seattle, Washington, U.S.
- Genres: Indie pop, Power Pop, Indie Rock, Baroque Pop, Chamber Pop
- Years active: 1997–2007, 2020–
- Labels: Capitol Music Group; Quince Records; Made In Mexico Records; Fugitive Recordings; Sonic Boom Recordings
- Members: Shane Tutmarc

Dolour is a band led by Shane Tutmarc.

== History ==
Dolour was formed in Seattle, Washington, releasing their debut 7" in mid-1998 on Theory Records, and two self-released EPs before releasing their first album Waiting For A World War in April 2001 on Sonic Boom Records. By the release of Waiting for a World War, Dolour had become a solo project for Shane Tutmarc. Tutmarc recorded Suburbiac, released on Fugitive Records in 2002, with producer Aaron Sprinkle. The self-produced New Old Friends was released on Made In Mexico Records in November 2004. In 2005, A Matter of Time: 2000-2005, an anthology, was released by Japanese label Quince Records. During 2004-2006 Dolour produced two separate albums, Hell or Highwater and Storm & Stress, which were combined and released on Japanese label Quince Records as The Years in the Wilderness in 2007. On December 6, 2007, Tutmarc announced the end of Dolour as he focused his efforts on the band Shane Tutmarc & the Traveling Mercies.

After Tutmarc pursued a solo career, Dolour became active again in 2020, releasing the album The Royal We, and in April 2021, the album Televangelist. In 2021, Dolour also released Origin Story, comprising re-recorded songs from previous releases.

== Discography ==
=== Studio albums ===
- Waiting for a World War (2001) Produced by Blake Wescott and Dolour. Sonic Boom Recordings
- Suburbiac (2002) Produced by Aaron Sprinkle and Shane Tutmarc. Fugitive Recordings
- New Old Friends (2004) Produced by Shane Tutmarc. Made in Mexico Records
- The Years in the Wilderness (2007) Produced by Shane Tutmarc. Quince Records (Japan)
- The Royal We (2020) Produced by Shane Tutmarc. Inverness Recordings
- Televangelist (2021) Produced by Shane Tutmarc. Inverness Recordings
- Origin Story (2021) Produced by Shane Tutmarc. Inverness Recordings
- Daylight Upon Magic (2024) Produced by Shane Tutmarc. Inverness Recordings
- New Old Friends xx (2024) Produced by Shane Tutmarc. Inverness Recordings
- Daylight Upon Magic (Deluxe) (2025) Produced by Shane Tutmarc. Inverness Recordings.

=== Collab albums ===
- Pinkerton (2026) with Jessica Lea Mayfield. Produced by Shane Tutmarc. Inverness Recordings.

=== EPs ===
- CPR (2003) - Promo CDEP for the forthcoming New Old Friends. Featuring "(Why Don't You] Come Around" later released on "A Matter of Time" collection.

Collection

- A Matter of Time: 2000-2005 (2005) - Featuring songs from the first three albums, plus the previously unreleased title-track, and rarities. Quince Records (Japan)

=== Singles ===
- The Shivering/That Dreadful Anthem 7" (1998) Produced by Aaron Sprinkle. Theory Records
- Iceland/The Ballad 7" (2001) - Early versions of Iceland, and So Done With You which were re-recorded for Suburbiac. West of January Records.

=== Compilations ===
- Menage A Trois (pre-Suburbiac 2001 recording) - Eighteen NW Bands for RAINN Benefit (2001)
- This Whole World - Making God Smile: An Artists' Tribute to the Songs of Beach Boy Brian Wilson (2002)
- Subject: I Called Your Name - All That Was Built Here (Ten Years At The Old Fire House) (2002)
- You Can't Make New Old Friends - In Honor: A Compilation to Beat Cancer (2004)
- An Easy Life (pre-Years in the Wilderness 2004 recording) - Various Artists - We Make Our Own Mistakes, Volume One (2005)
- Eye For An Eye and It's All Up To You - One Voice for Home: A Collection of Music by Artists Against Violence (2007)
- I Need A New Mentor (previously unreleased 2006 recording) - "Three Imaginary Girls 10th Anniversary Mix CD" (2012)
