= Ian McGlynn =

American drummer

- Origin: Born Morristown, NJ, US
- Genres: Alternative indie pop
- Occupations: Singer-songwriter, composer. record producer
- Years active: 1998–present
- Website: ianmcglynn.com

Ian McGlynn is an American singer-songwriter, pianist, drummer, composer, producer, and writer for TV & film.

== Career ==
In 1998, McGlynn released his debut self-titled 6-song EP. In 2001, McGlynn recorded a live album, "Lemon" with his father Ed McGlynn, the drummer of the New Jersey–based band The Shadows. "Lemon" was released in December 2002.

In April 2004, McGlynn released his debut full-length album "Tomorrow's Taken." In 2007, "Tomorrow's Re-Taken," was released featuring remixes of songs from "Tomorrow's Taken," by various artists. McGlynn also released "Diamonds," a 3-song EP, that year.

In 2008, the 3-song "Memorial Day Parade EP," was released as a precursor to McGlynn's second full-length album "This is the Sound." The 11-song album features the singles, "Play Dead," "Peninsula," and "Night Driving."

In June 2012, McGlynn released his third full-length album, "Now We're Golden," recorded in New Jersey, Amsterdam, and Paris and was produced by Ken Stringfellow.

In 2013, McGlynn released a 6-song EP of original Christmas songs called "North Pole Vault EP."

In 2016, McGlynn released a piano lullaby album called "Now We're Golden – Piano Lullabies," of his 2012 full-length, "Now We're Golden."

== Discography ==
=== Albums ===
- Tomorrow's Taken (2004) Bailey Park Records, LLC
- This Is the Sound (2008) Bailey Park Records, LLC
- Now We're Golden (2012) Bailey Park Records, LLC
- Now We're Golden – Piano Lullabies (2016) Bailey Park Records, LLC

=== EP's ===
- Diamonds EP (2007) Bailey Park Records, LLC
- Memorial Day Parade EP (2008) Bailey Park Records, LLC
- North Pole Vault EP (2013) Bailey Park Records, LLC

=== Singles ===
- Nowhere (2009) Bailey Park Records, LLC
- I Took an Oath (2009) Bailey Park Records, LLC
- Listening In (from My Mom's New Boyfriend) (2009) Bailey Park Records, LLC
- We Should Hang in the Museum (2009) Bailey Park Records, LLC
- Listen to the Choir Sing (2009) Bailey Park Records, LLC
- Monsters Cry Too b/w Witch Hunt (2010) Bailey Park Records, LLC
- The Snow Angel and the Icicle Sword (2010) Bailey Park Records, LLC
- Digital Killed the Record Store (2011) Bailey Park Records, LLC
- In A Car With You (2011) Bailey Park Records, LLC
- Change The Weather (2011) Bailey Park Records, LLC
- Flag Day (2016) Bailey Park Records, LLC

=== Live and Remix ===
- Lemon (2002) Self-Released
- Tomorrow's Re-taken (2007) Bailey Park Records, LLC

=== Compilations ===
- Other Songs and Dances Vol. 1 (2006) Backlight Records
  Includes McGlynn's song "Catharsis"
- Beautiful Escape: The Songs of The Posies Revisited – The Green Album (2008) Burning Sky Records
  McGlynn covers "When Mute Tongues Can Speak"

== TV and film ==
- "Nowhere" (film version) (co-written with Chris Newkirk) is featured in the end credits of Off the Black, starring Nick Nolte and Timothy Hutton.
- "How Did I Get Here?" (DM Remix) and "No Time" (CoCo Remix) are featured in the documentary One – A Lucid Experience.
- "Listening In" (co-written with Chris Newkirk and John Bonaventura) was written for and featured in My Mom's New Boyfriend, starring Meg Ryan and Antonio Banderas.
- An untitled instrumental piano piece is featured in the Dwell.com short featuring designer-architect Jeffrey Beers. The short is "The Intelligent Kitchen" by Gary Nadeau.
- "Bampa" (co-written with Dave Macarone of Shy Talkers) is featured in the Green Domain 30-second commercial spot. McGlynn also acts in it.
- An untitled instrumental piano piece is featured in the Dwell.com short featuring husband-and-wife architecture team Yoshiko Sato and Michael Morris. The short is "The Bathroom Reinvented" by Gary Nadeau.
- "No Squares" (co-written with Chris Newkirk and Dave Macarone of Shy Talkers) is featured in the 2010 Heineken Light "Heineken Light Trailer" movie theater commercial.
- "Banana Boat" (co-written with Dave Macarone of Shy Talkers) is featured in the 30-second T-Mobile commercial "School Bus".
- Thirteen short scores composed and performed with Dave Macarone (of Shy Talkers) for thirteen short commercials for "Downtown Dubai – The Centre of Now".
- "Snack Pack" (co-written with Dave Macarone of Shy Talkers) is featured in the 30-second T-Mobile commercial "Musical Chairs".
- "Twix Bites – Walkman," McGlynn was hired to sing "Get Out Of My Dreams, Get Into My Car" by Billy Ocean.
- "Show Me How You Roll" (co-written with Dave Macarone) is featured in the new fall denim 2017 collection ad for Lucky brand Jeans.
