= Headphones (band) =

American indie rock-synth band

- Origin: Seattle, Washington, US
- Genres: Indie rock, indietronica, synthpop
- Years active: 2005–2006
- Labels: Suicide Squeeze
- Past members: Tim Walsh, David Bazan, Frank Lenz, Nicholas Peterson
- Website: http://www.davidbazan.com/

Headphones was an American indie rock-synth band with members David Bazan of Pedro the Lion, Frank Lenz of Starflyer 59, and T. W. Walsh. Nicholas Peterson (formerly of Fleet Foxes) toured as Headphones' drummer.

== History ==
Headphones, a project led by David Bazan, formed in 2005 and released one album shortly before the dissolution of Bazan's primary creative outlet, Pedro the Lion. The band's sound is marked by the use of synthesizers paired with live drums and percussion, and sometimes drew comparisons to other indie rock electronic groups such as The Postal Service. Bazan drew a distinction between Headphones and electronic pop, however, and has said that he had no interest in paying homage to either 1980s music or dance-pop, such as the Postal Service attempted, instead aiming for a simple synthesizer and drums setup that "live(d) and breathe(d) like rock 'n' roll."

The band is also unique to Bazan in terms of the lyrical style. Bazan often included religious references in his work with Pedro the Lion, but Headphones was considered a more secular band in comparison.

The band toured extensively in support of its debut album, Headphones, which received positive critical reception.

T.W. Walsh, who joined Bazan during the final two years of Pedro the Lion's tenure, was originally a member of the group, but later left both bands for personal reasons.

David Bazan said during Q&A at a show in Little Rock, AR that he planned on recording another album under the Headphones moniker. However, on March 5, 2011, Bazan's manager, Bob Andrews (artist manager) wrote that Headphones would not release another album.

During his September 2011 living room shows David mentioned that he plans on recording another 'Headphones style' album, but not under the name Headphones. Citing low sales and turn outs to live shows David added, "I wouldn't do that to my wife again."

== Discography ==
- Headphones (2005)
