= Power Ballads (Aqueduct album) =

Studio album by Aqueduct
- Released: February 25, 2003
- Genre: Indie pop, lo-fi
- Length: 49:37
- Label: aqueductisgoodmusic

Aqueduct chronology
| Power Ballads (2003) | Pistols at Dawn (2004) |

Professional ratings
Review scores
| Source | Rating |
|---|---|
| Allmusic | 4/5 stars |

Power Ballads is the debut album by Aqueduct. It was recorded by Trent Bell at Bell Labs (Flaming Lips, Starlight Mints) and self-released on February 25, 2003. After releasing the album, frontman David Terry relocated to Seattle, Washington. Twelve hours after Terry's arrival in Seattle, Aqueduct opened for Modest Mouse. Ben Gibbard (of Death Cab For Cutie) subsequently recommended Aqueduct to Barsuk Records, who signed the band and released Pistols at Dawn in 2004.

== Track listing ==
1. "Assignment #1: Heart Design"
2. "Growing Up With GNR"
3. "Try It Now!"
4. "Post Rock and Slightly Seasoned"
5. "Revolving Door/Mike Tyson's Punch-Out"
6. "Frantic (Harrison Ford Version)"
7. "Social Scenic"
8. "Krushed"
9. "Bummer"
