= Josh Ottum =

American songwriter

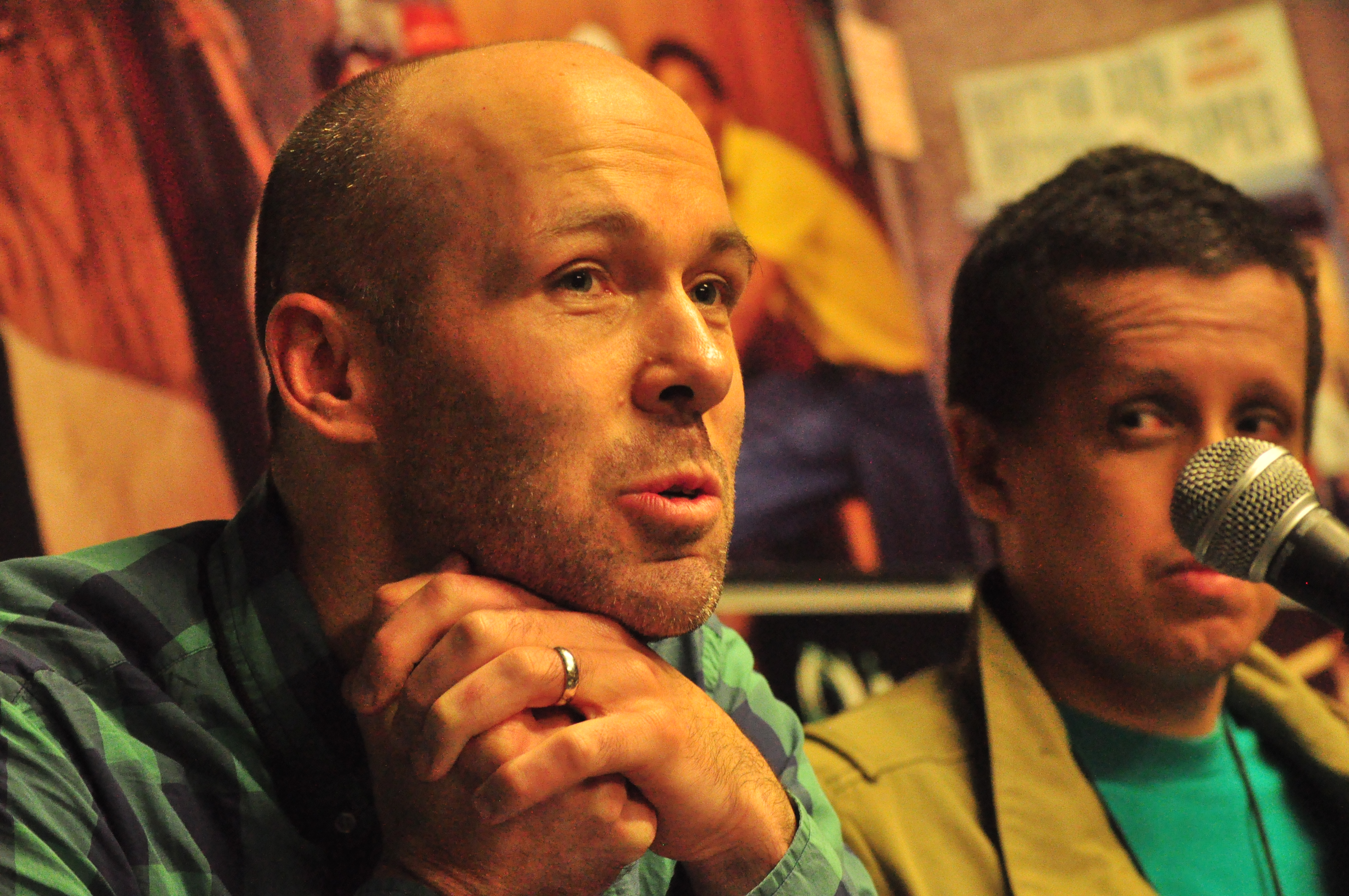
Ottum presenting at the 2014 Pop Conference at the EMP Museum. Will Creason is in the background.

Josh Ottum (born March 1978) is an American musician, songwriter, and scholar. Ottum recorded Like The Season between October 2005 and June 2006 it was released in the fall of 2006 in Europe by Tapete Records, along with an EP, Who Left The Lights On?. Ottum was part of the 2006 Reeperbahn Festival in Hamburg, Germany, and toured extensively through Europe in November 2006 and May 2007. Mill Pond Records released the It's Alright EP in May 2007. Ottum was part the Sit Down and Sing tour with Rosie Thomas and Nicolai Dunger in April 2008. Like The Season came out in the United States on October 20, 2009 on Cheap Lullaby Records. The Mellow Out EP was released by Tapete Records in May 2011 followed by Ottum's second full-length Watch TV, released on July 8, 2011.

Ottum's third album, recorded in part with orchestral instrumentation, was funded through Kickstarter in 2012.

== Discography ==
EPs

- Who Left The Lights On? (Europe)- November 7, 2006
- It's Alright (U.S.)- May 15, 2007
- Mellow Out 2011

LPs

- Like The Season (Europe) - November 15, 2006
- Like The Season (U.S.) - October 20, 2009
- Watch TV 2011
- Smart/dumb - 2012
