= Aqueduct (band) =

American indie pop band

Aqueduct is an American, Seattle, Washington-based indie pop band, originally hailing from Tulsa, Oklahoma, United States. Initially the band was a one-man act, created and produced by David Terry in his bedroom. Supporting members have more recently been added to the group. Aqueduct has played with Seattle bands United State of Electronica, Modest Mouse, and Death Cab for Cutie among others. They have received praise for their application of synthpop meter, drum, and piano, which has become more complex as the band has grown in membership.

== History ==
Aqueduct was founded in Tulsa as the solo project of pop aficionado David Terry. Twelve hours after relocating to Seattle from Tulsa in 2003, Aqueduct was opening for Modest Mouse at The Showbox.

After months of culling and polishing new and pre-existing material with the help of producer Matt Pence, Aqueduct completed an EP, Pistols at Dawn, and the full-length album I Sold Gold. Of the debut album, Pitchfork Media said David Terry's "personal, cerebral pop [is] worth coming back to." The follow-up Or Give Me Death was released in February 2007 by Barsuk Records.

In 2015 Aqueduct returned with the album Wild Knights, coinciding with the successful funding of the Aqueduct Vinyl Project on Kickstarter.

== Band members ==
=== Current ===
- David Terry – Vocals, Piano, Synthesizer, Clavinet, Rhodes, Guitar, Bass
- Matthew Nader – Guitar, Bass, Vocals, Percussion
- Andy Fitts – Bass, Vocals
- Matt Pence - Drums
- Kimo Muraki - Pedal Steel, Coronet, Tenor & Alto Sax, Bass Clarinet, Flute

=== Past ===
- Chris Whitten – drums
- David Bynum – bass
- Chris Barnes – bass
- Jason Holstrom – guitar
- Colin Carmichael – drums
- Jeff Johnston – bass
- James McCalister – drums
- Andrew Rudd – drums, guitar, vocals
- Justin Wilmore – bass
- Noah Ritter – bass

== Discography ==
- Power Ballads (2003) - Barsuk Records
- Pistols at Dawn (2004) - Barsuk Records
- I Sold Gold (2005) - Barsuk Records
- Or Give Me Death (2007) - Barsuk Records
- Wild Knights (2015) - Aqueduct Music
