= Pedro the Lion =

American indie rock band

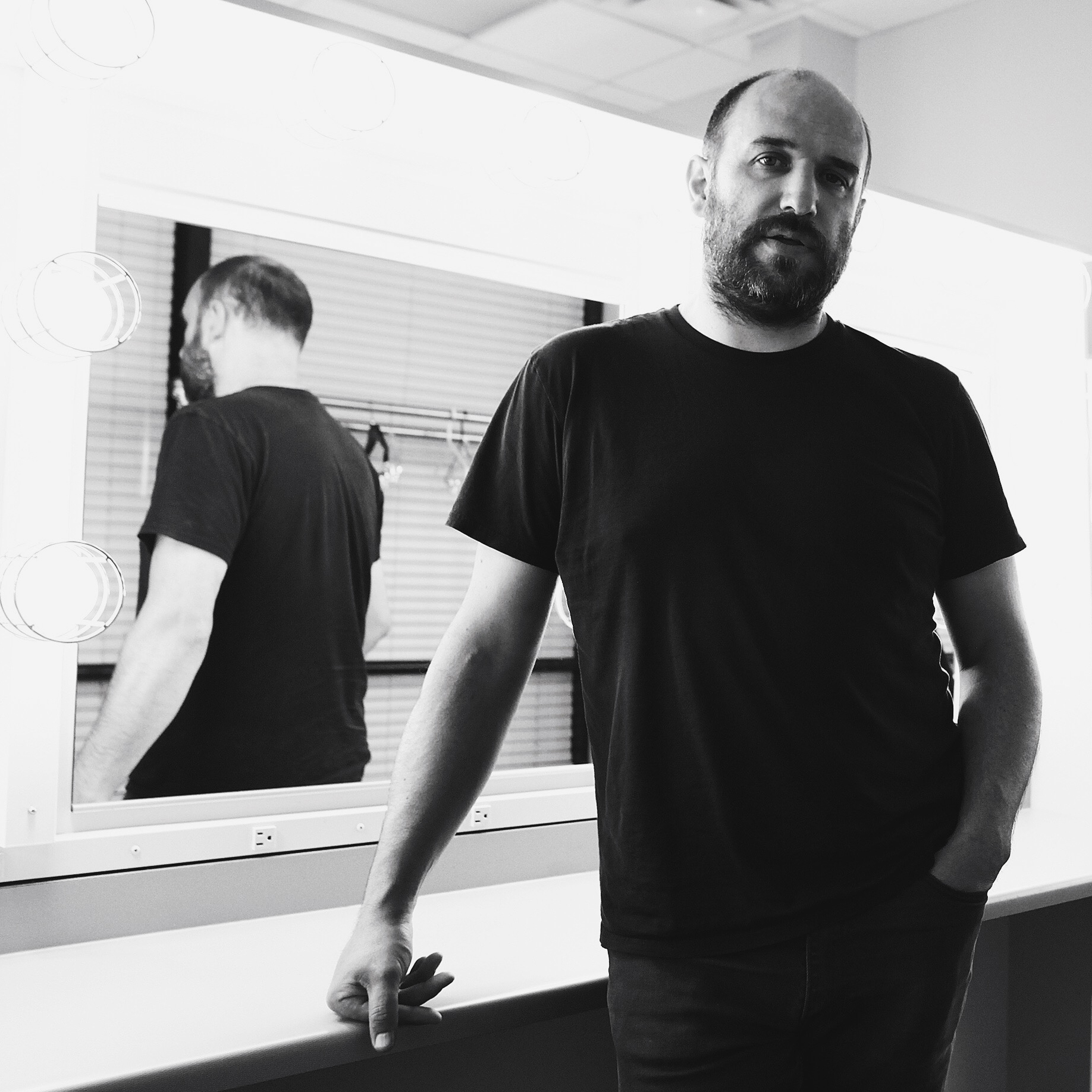
- Pedro the Lion's David Bazan in 2017

Background information
- Origin: Seattle, Washington, U.S.
- Genres: Indie rock; slowcore; emo
- Years active: 1995–2006, 2017–present
- Labels: Jade Tree; Suicide Squeeze; Architecture Label; Tooth & Nail; Made in Mexico; Big Scary Monsters
- Members: David Bazan; Erik Walters; Terence Ankeny
- Past members: See list of former members
- Website: www.pedrothelion.com

Pedro the Lion is an American indie rock band from Seattle, Washington, United States. David Bazan formed the band in 1995 and represented its main creative force, backed by a varying rotation of collaborating musicians. In 2006 Pedro the Lion was dissolved as Bazan went solo and performed under his own name. Bazan reformed the band and resumed performing under the Pedro the Lion moniker in late 2017. Releasing seven full-length albums and five EPs since 1997, the band is known for its first person narrative lyrics.

== History ==
Pedro the Lion was formed by David Bazan in 1995. The name of the band comes from a character that would have been interwoven into the band's first album. In 1997 they released their debut EP Whole with Bazan playing nearly every instrument, a format he continued on the band's first two full-length albums, It's Hard to Find a Friend (1998), and Winners Never Quit (2000).

Winners marked Pedro the Lion's first concept album. After its completion, Bazan has claimed he initially decided not to continue writing concept albums. However, in the process of writing his next full-length Control, he realized he had inadvertently created a narrative link "about 70% of the way through [the album]" and decided to finish it in the same vein. The album's thematic content criticizes American capitalism, which Bazan notes was largely inspired by the sentiments surrounding the World Trade Organization protests in 1999.

Control also saw Casey Foubert of Seattle-based Seldom join Pedro the Lion to play bass on the album. Additionally, Foubert co-wrote "Penetration" and "Second Best", the third and eighth tracks, respectively, on the album, which was released in 2002. Among other collaborations with music artists, Foubert has subsequently worked as a touring musician for singer-songwriter Sufjan Stevens and the Portland-based indie rock band, The Shins.

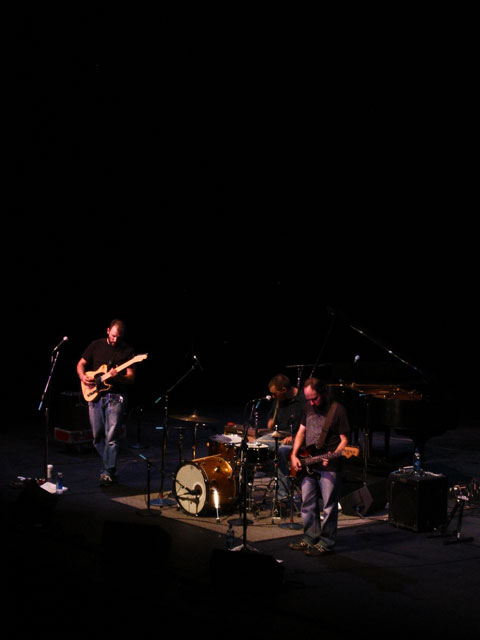
Pedro the Lion performing in 2004, Bazan is at the far left playing guitar

Achilles Heel followed, released on May 24, 2004, and marked the beginning of Bazan's partnership with TW Walsh as the band's primary writers and musicians. Bazan described the tracks in the fourth full-length from Pedro the Lion as a return to the songwriting characterized by Friend and the Secure EP in the sense that there was no "pretense of anything bigger", an allusion to his previous concept albums.

In early January 2006, Pedro the Lion formally announced that they had split. The split was amicable; Bazan and Walsh continue to be good friends. Bazan said that their friendship has even been strengthened by the breakup. Bazan toured in support of Fewer Moving Parts, his solo debut EP. Walsh returned to his career as a Web application developer and is busy with his band, The Soft Drugs, and their debut release, In Moderation. David Bazan released his debut solo LP, Curse Your Branches, on Seattle-based Barsuk Records in 2009.

The Pedro The Lion catalog was remastered for vinyl by TW Walsh and reissued in 2012.

Bazan is a member of Overseas with Will Johnson of Centro-matic and Bubba & Matt Kadane of Bedhead and The New Year. Their self-titled debut album was released on June 11, 2013.

Beginning in spring 2017, Bazan began forming a new band which he initially envisioned billing as "David Bazan Band" or something similar. In October 2017, Bazan announced that Pedro the Lion would be reforming beginning with several shows in December 2017. Asked if there would be new material, Bazan explained that the band will initially be playing Pedro the Lion's existing catalog along with limited performances of songs from Headphones and Bazan's solo catalog, with new material to follow.

In 2019 the band put out their first album in their autobiographical series called Phoenix which was followed by Havasu in 2022 and Santa Cruz in 2024 in the same set.

== Personnel ==
Member	Contribution	Tenure	Associated acts
David Bazan	vocals, guitar, bass, drums, keys, percussion	1997–2006, 2017–present	Headphones, The Undertow Orchestra, Unwed Sailor, Lo Tom, others
Erik Walters	guitar	2017–present	Silver Torches, The Globes, Perfume Genius
Andrew Rudd	drums	2025–present
Terence Ankeny	drums	2020–2024	Spirit Award
Benjamin Brubaker	drums	1998–1999, 2003	Damien Jurado, Denison Witmer
Jeremy Dybash	drums	1998	Velour 100
Johnathon Ford	bass	1998, 2002	Unwed Sailor, Roadside Monument
Casey Foubert	drums, keyboards	2001–2004	Seldom, Crystal Skulls, Sufjan Stevens, The Shins
Josh Golden	bass	1998–2000	Damien Jurado
Sean Lane	drums	2017–2019	Perfume Genius, Yppah, Pickwick, Noah Gundersen, Hey Marseilles, others
Frank Lenz	drums	2004–2005	Starflyer 59, Headphones, Fold Zandura, The Lassie Foundation
Ken Maiuri	bass	2004–2005	The Mammals, The Soft Drugs, Mark Mulcahy
Trey Many	drums, bass, guitar	1998, 2000–2001, 2005	Velour 100, Starflyer 59, His Name Is Alive, Lo Tom
Yuuki Matthews	keys	2000–2001	Seldom, Crystal Skulls, Sufjan Stevens, The Shins
James McAlister	keys, percussion, drums	2004	Ester Drang, Sufjan Stevens, Denison Witmer
Paul Mumaw	drums	1998	Rose Blossom Punch
Brian Olson	drums	1997
Nick Peterson	guitar	1997–1999	Fleet Foxes, Headphones
Tim Schiefer	guitar	1997
Travis Smith	bass	1997
Tim Walsh	bass, guitar, keys, drums	2000, 2002, 2003–2006	The Soft Drugs, Headphones, Lo Tom
Christian Wargo	guitar	2003	Fleet Foxes, Crystal Skulls, Scientific
Blake Wescott	drums	1998	Seldom, Crystal Skulls, Damien Jurado, Denison Witmer, Bloomsday
Casey Wescott	keys	2001	Fleet Foxes, The Vogue, Seldom, Crystal Skulls

== Discography ==
=== Albums ===
Title	Album details
It's Hard to Find a Friend	Released: 1998; Label: Made in Mexico / Jade Tree; Formats: CD, LP
Winners Never Quit	Released: 2000; Label: Jade Tree; Formats: CD, LP
Control	Released: 2002; Label: Jade Tree; Formats: CD, LP
Achilles Heel	Released: 2004; Label: Jade Tree; Formats: CD, LP
Phoenix	Released: 2019; Label: Polyvinyl; Formats: CD, LP, Digital
Havasu	Released: 2022; Label: Polyvinyl; Formats: CD, LP, Digital
Santa Cruz	Released: 2024; Label: Polyvinyl; Formats: CD, LP, Digital

=== EPs ===
Title	EP details
Whole EP	Released: 1997; Label: Tooth & Nail; Formats: CD, 7-inch
The Only Reason I Feel Secure	Released: 1999; Label: Made in Mexico / Jade Tree; Formats: CD, LP
Progress	Released: 2000; Label: Suicide Squeeze; Formats: CD, 7-inch
Tour EP '04	Released: 2004; Label: Self-released / Jade Tree; Formats: CD
Stations	Released: 2004; Label: Self-released; Formats: CD, Digital
Live At The Crumb	Released: 2024; Label: Polyvinyl Record Co; Formats: Digital

=== 7 Inch Singles ===
Title	Year	Label	Pressings
"Big Trucks"	1998	Made in Mexico	1,000 copies
"Song A" / "Song B" (Sub Pop Singles Club)	1999	Sub Pop	1,300 copies
"Helicopter"	1999	Homemade Recordings (*Not an official release*)	1,000 copies (250 red, 750 black)
"Progress" / "A Guitar for Janie"	2000	Suicide Squeeze	2,000 copies (with storybook)
"I Heard the Bells on Christmas Day"	2002	Suicide Squeeze	1,500 copies (500 green, 1,000 red)
"The Poison Makes" / "Walk Slow" (Pedro the Lion / Seldom split)	2003	Bedside Recordings	500 copies (hand-numbered)
"The First Noel"	2003	Suicide Squeeze	3,000 copies (white vinyl)
"God Rest Ye Merry Gentlemen"	2005	Suicide Squeeze	2,000 copies (marbled vinyl)
"B" Split Single w/ Lync	2024	Suicide Squeeze	300 copies (transparent blue) 450 copies (opaque purple)

=== Compilations ===
Title	Compilation details
"The Longer I Lay Here" (live)	Exploitation of Sound Vol. 1 – Hero Music – 1999
"Breadwinner You"	The Unaccompanied Voice: An A Capella Compilation – Secretly Canadian – 2000
"Rapture", "Backwoods Nation"	Location Is Everything Vol. 1 – Jade Tree – 2002
"I Do" (live)	Location Is Everything Vol. 2 – Jade Tree – 2004
"Discretion"	Take Action! Volume 04 – Sub City Records – 2004
"I Heard the Bells on Christmas Day" (new rendition)	Maybe This Christmas Tree – Nettwerk – 2004

== Other appearances ==
- The band is featured in the 2004 Christian music documentary Why Should the Devil Have All the Good Music?
- Maybe This Christmas Tree, "I Heard the Bells on Christmas Day" (2004)
- Pedro the Lion provides all music for the 2019 documentary Strange Negotiations (named after the title of David Bazan's 2011 album Strange Negotiations).
