= David Bazan =

American singer-songwriter

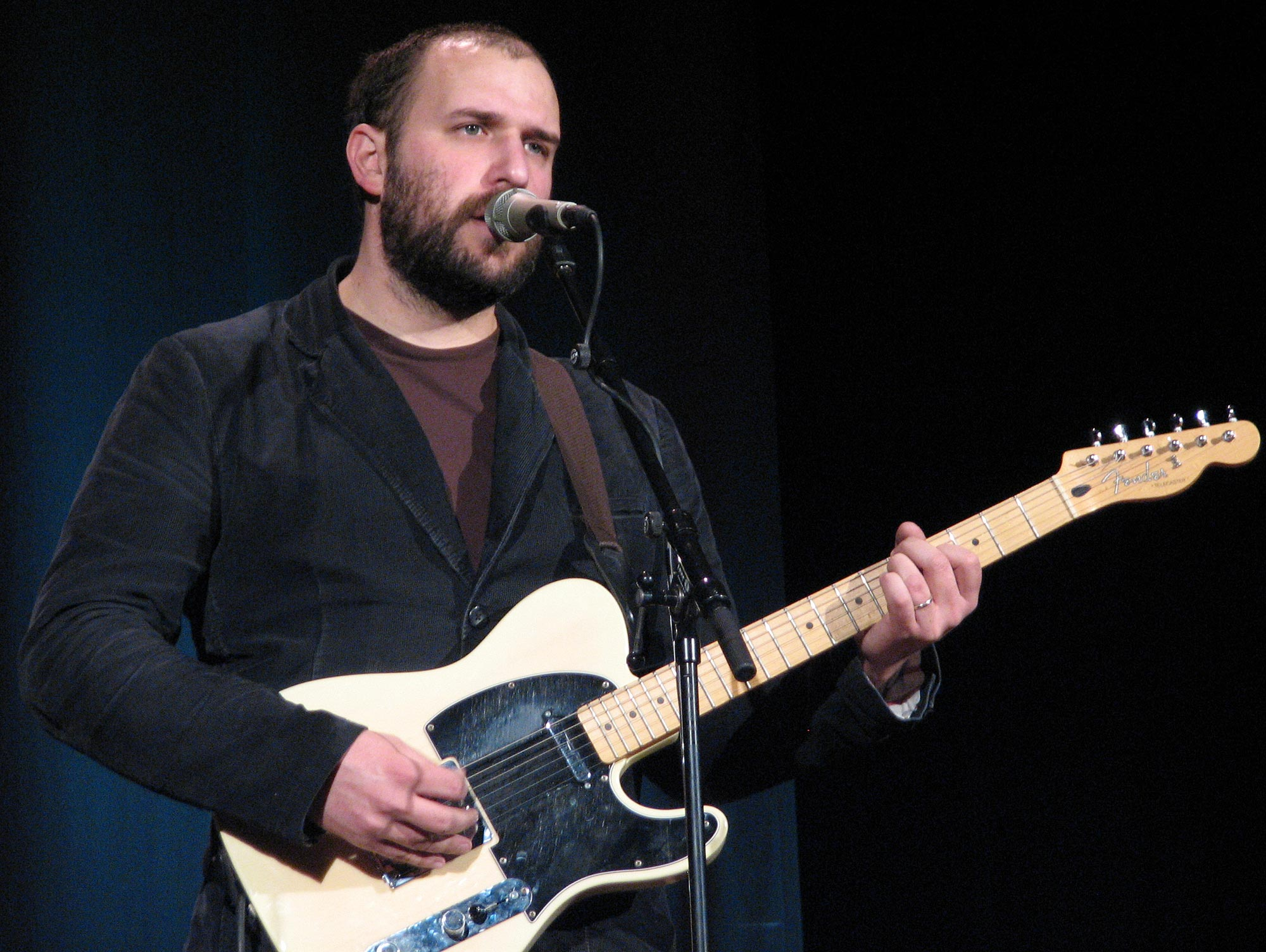
- David Bazan in Örebro, Sweden on February 9, 2008.

Background information
- Born: David Shannon Bazan; January 22, 1976 (age 50)
- Origin: Phoenix, Arizona, U.S.
- Genres: Indie rock, emo, slowcore, sadcore
- Occupation: Singer-songwriter
- Instruments: Vocals, guitar, bass, piano, keyboards, synthesizer, drums, percussion
- Years active: 1995–present
- Labels: Barsuk Records, Jade Tree, Suicide Squeeze, Tooth and Nail
- Website: davidbazan.com

David Shannon Bazan (/bəˈzɑːn/; born January 22, 1976) is an American indie rock singer-songwriter from Phoenix, Arizona who now resides in Edmonds, Washington. Bazan is the lead singer and creative force behind the band Pedro the Lion and was the lead singer of Headphones. In early 2006, he began performing and recording under his own name. In late 2017 he returned to playing under the Pedro the Lion name.

== Career ==
In the early 90s he played drums in the band The Guilty (later named Coolidge) with fellow songwriter Damien Jurado. Bazan had attended Shorewood High School with Jurado.

In 2002, he played drums and sang backup vocals for Seldom; in 2004, he played with Starflyer 59. Bazan has made various studio appearances with Seattle-based bands; for instance, in 2004 he sang on the Six Parts Seven remix album Lost Notes From Forgotten Songs, played drums in 1998 on Unwed Sailor's Firecracker EP. Bazan also contributed to the Rosie Thomas album These Friends of Mine.

In 2005, Bazan collaborated with TW Walsh, Frank Lenz of Starflyer 59 and Nick Peterson (formerly of Fleet Foxes), comprising the band Headphones. Walsh later left the band for personal reasons after a tour on which he handled drum duties. Peterson filled in on drums for the remaining Headphones live shows. The band released one self-titled LP and there were no subsequent plans from Bazan to continue recording under the Headphones moniker.

Bazan was part of The Undertow Orchestra with Mark Eitzel (American Music Club), Will Johnson (Centro-matic, South San Gabriel), Vic Chesnutt, and Scott Danbom (Centro-matic, South San Gabriel). They toured the United States and Europe in 2006.

Bazan is a personal friend of comedian Horatio Sanz, and performed at Sanz's 2006 Christmas show, The Ho-Ho-Horatio Christmas Special, at the Upright Citizens Brigade Theatre in New York City. In 2007 he did a Take-Away Show acoustic video session.

Bazan has also been involved with Crystal Skulls and Walsh's band The Soft Drugs.

Bazan is a member of Overseas with Will Johnson of Centro-matic and Bubba & Matt Kadane of Bedhead and The New Year. Their debut album was officially announced on April 4, 2013, and was released on June 11, 2013.

Bazan formed a new band called Lo Tom with longtime friends Jason Martin (of Starflyer 59), Trey Many (of Starflyer 59 and Velour 100), and TW Walsh. They released their debut record on Barsuk in July 2017.

In 2019, the documentary Strange Negotiations starring Bazan was released, directed by Brandon Vedder. The film catalogs the inner battles faced by Bazan, in both spiritual and artistic contexts, occurring during religious debate in the United States spurred by the 2016 presidential election.

=== Solo projects ===
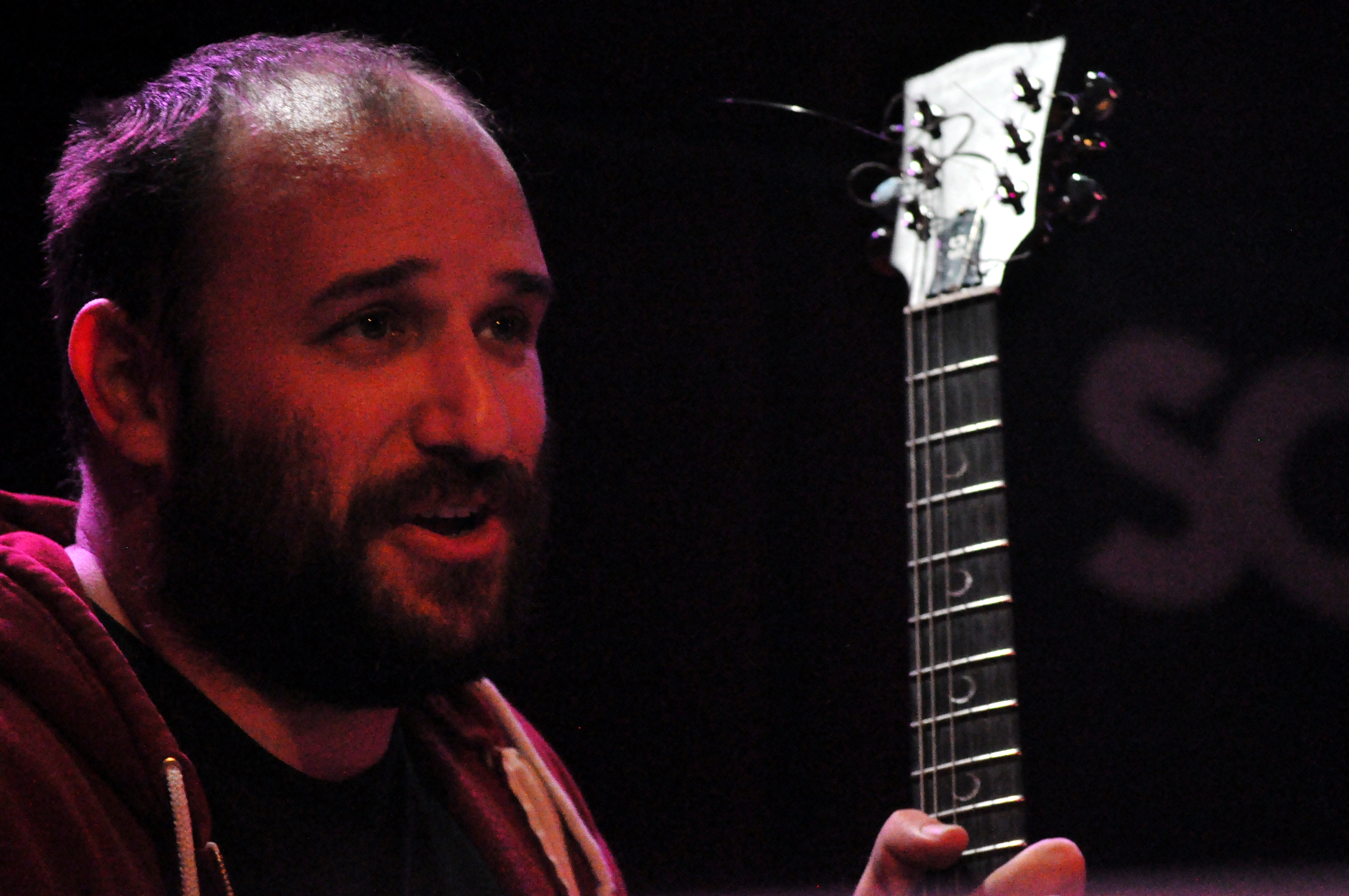
David Bazan, 2011

Bazan recorded his first solo project, the EP Fewer Moving Parts, in between touring as a member of The Undertow Orchestra. The EP was released on June 13, 2006. In 2007, he completed a nationwide solo tour featuring Ben Gibbard of Death Cab for Cutie and Johnathan Rice and also contributed a cover of the song "Let Down" to Stereogum's OK X project, a tribute to the Radiohead album OK Computer.

In September 2008, in an interview with 89.3 The Current, Bazan mentioned that his next album would be played entirely by him and that he would recruit friends to play live when he tours. During his solo tour in September 2008, Bazan debuted six other songs that were on the short list for Curse Your Branches: "Weeds in the Wheat", "Curse Your Branches", "Broken Arm", "In Stitches", and "Harmless Sparks."

Bazan released his first DVD the following month. The DVD contains interviews and intimate live performances filmed in his home studio, on his front porch, and while driving around in his Ford Bronco. It was shot during two weekends in June and July 2008 in Seattle. The DVD, entitled Bazan: Alone at the Microphone, was released October 21, 2008.

In October 2008, Bazan released the album version of "American Flags" on his Facebook and Myspace pages to coincide with the 2008 United States presidential election. The track was made available for purchase on iTunes and other online vendors in November, along with a version of "Please, Baby, Please" recorded for the DVD.

Beginning in March 2009, Bazan played a series of small, acoustic house shows. The smaller shows allowed him to debut new material and generate income, while still maintaining a low profile per the request of his record label.

Bazan's full-length debut album, Curse Your Branches, (Note: Bazan's album was tentatively titled David Bazan's Black Cloud) was released on September 1, 2009, on Barsuk Records. His second full-length solo album, Strange Negotiations, was released May 24, 2011.

In 2012, he toured with Dallas Green on his Little Hell USA Tour in the Southern United States. The same year, The David Bazan Band did a tour dedicated specifically to playing the album "Control" that Bazan had recorded with Pedro the Lion in 2002.

In July 2014 Bazan announced that he would be releasing new material. This project would be called "Bazan Monthly". He would be releasing 2 new songs on the first of each month for five months. So over the five-month span he will have released ten songs. Those ten songs will be called "Volume 1". This music will be released in the form of digital downloads as well as 7" vinyl.

In September 2014 David announced that he would be touring with the Passenger String Quartet in support of his album "David Bazan and the Passenger String Quartet". This album was a collaboration piece featuring songs off of some of the Pedro the Lion albums as well as some of Bazan's solo albums. He also said he would be playing music off of his "Bazan Monthly: Volume 1" album.

In January 2015, Bazan began releasing singles for his Bazan Monthly Volume 2, which was released in the same format as Volume 1. This project comprised 10 songs, released from January–May 2015. During this time he embarked on another Living Room Tour playing songs from both Bazan Monthly volumes, with Yuuki Matthews, who also performs in The Shins and Crystal Skulls, supporting on keyboard and synthesizer.

== Discography ==
=== Albums ===
Title	Album details
Curse Your Branches	Released: September 1, 2009; Label: Barsuk; Formats: CD, LP
Strange Negotiations	Released: May 24, 2011; Label: Barsuk; Formats: CD, LP
Blanco	Released: May 13, 2016; Label: Barsuk; Formats: CD, LP, Cassette
Dark Sacred Night	Released: November 11, 2016; Label: Suicide Squeeze; Formats: CD, LP, Digital
Care	Released: March 7, 2017; Label: Undertow (Self-released); Formats: CD, LP, Digital

=== DVDs ===
Title	Details
Bazan: Alone at the Microphone	Released: October 21, 2008; Format: DVD

=== EPs ===
Title	EP details
7 Song Demo	Released: 1994; Label: Self-released; Formats: Cassette (Demo)
Fewer Moving Parts	Released: June 13, 2006; Label: Barsuk; Formats: CD, LP
Live at Electrical Audio	Released: March 15, 2010; Label: Self-released; Formats: CD, LP
Spring 2013 Tour	Released: 2013; Label: Self-released; Formats: Digital
Rare Coins: David Bazan & Sean Lane	Released: April 6, 2018; Label: 15 Passenger; Formats: LP

=== Singles ===
Title	Single details
"The Poison Makes" / "Walk Slow" (split single)	Released: 2003; Label: Bedside Recordings; Formats: 7-inch
"Away in a Manger"	Released: October 25, 2006; Label: Suicide Squeeze; Formats: 7-inch
"Jingle Bells"	Released: November 4, 2008; Label: Suicide Squeeze; Formats: 7-inch
"American Flags"	Released: January 2009; Label: Barsuk; Formats: 7-inch
"The Man in Me"	Released: September 1, 2009; Label: Barsuk; Formats: 7-inch, Digital
"Happy Xmas (War Is Over)"	Released: October 6, 2009; Label: Suicide Squeeze; Formats: 7-inch
"Wish My Kids Were Here"	Released: November 9, 2010; Label: Suicide Squeeze; Formats: 7-inch
Bazan Monthly Volume 1 (7-inch issued each month, July to Nov 2014)	Released: 2014; Label: Undertow Music; Formats: Digital, 7-inch vinyl
Bazan Monthly Volume 2 (7-inch issued each month, Jan to May 2015)	Released: 2015; Label: Undertow Music; Formats: Digital, 7-inch vinyl
"Thread" (split single with Kevin Devine)	Released: 2018; Label: Devinyl Splits / Bad Timing Records; Formats: 7-inch

=== Compilation appearances ===
Appearance	Details
"Hard Times"	Appears on Come O Spirit – Sounds Familyre – 2009
