= Look Out Mama =

Studio album by Hooray for the Riff Raff
- Released: May 1, 2012
- Genre: Americana
- Length: 38:42
- Label: Born to Win Records

Hooray for the Riff Raff chronology
Young Blood Blues (2010)	Look Out Mama (2012)	My Dearest Darkest Neighbor (2013)

Look Out Mama is the fifth studio album by Hurray for the Riff Raff. It was released on January 6, 2013, through Born to Win Records and Loose Music in Europe on August 20, 2012. The album was recorded in Nashville, Tennessee at The Bomb Shelter Studios and produced by Andrija Tokic who has worked with Alabama Shakes. Rolling Stone reported with this record as well as 2014's Small Town Heroes, Hurray for the Riff Raff "has emerged as one of NOLA’s foremost singer-songwriters."

== Background ==
The Kennedy Center said "In the tradition of Bob Dylan with Band and Neil Young with Crazy Horse, Alynda and Yosi recruited the Tumbleweeds to be their touring band, drastically altering the sound of Hurray for the Riff Raff. Look Out Mama is the result of almost two years of Alynda and the Tumbleweeds criss-crossing the U.S., playing over 100 shows in small bars and clubs."

In a track-by-track commentary about the making of Look Out Mama, Segarra said that the title track, "Look Out Mama," was recorded in "probably two takes at most." They said that their track "Ramblin' Gal" was a response to Hank Williams' song, "Rambling Man." And on "Ode to John and Yoko," they said that they were "obviously a huge John Lennon fan." And that the final track, "Something's Wrong," was recorded on Tokic's "front porch during a thunderstorm and tornado warning." Segarra also said this song was written for "New Orleans, kind of a lullaby that was written after a very dark and traumatic period where there was a lot of violence in my community. I felt very weak and helpless, like there was nothing i could do to help anyone who was feeling so much grief. So i wrote this one, we recorded it on our first day in the studio and right when we finished a tornado siren blew (in key with the song!) and the power went out. We took it as a good sign."

They performed at SXSW, opening the set with "Look Out Mama."

== Critical reception ==
NPR's Ann Powers wrote that Segarra's "voice was the one I wanted to hear at least once a day in 2012," ranking Lout Out Mama in her top ten of 2012. NPR's Stephen Thompson said "The New Orleans band Hurray for the Riff Raff exists as a vehicle for the powerhouse songs of singer-songwriter Alynda Lee Segarra, whose gigantic voice conveys the grit of bluesy soul while still fitting within the realms of rootsy folk and country." And American Roots declared that "This album is perfect."

The New York Times noted that "Hurray for the Riff Raff is part of the loosely cohered movement of younger musicians embracing and reframing—but only slightly—American roots music, giving it a polish of currency but otherwise leaving its bones intact."

== Track listing ==
All tracks are written by Alynda Mariposa Segarra.

Look Out Mama
No.	Title	Length
1.	"Little Black Star"	3:08
2.	"Look Out Mama"	3:25
3.	"Ramblin' Gal"	3:18
4.	"What's Wrong with Me"	3:51
5.	"Ode to John and Yoko"	5:52
6.	"Lake of Fire"	3:42
7.	"Riley"	4:51
8.	"Go Out on the Road"	4:18
9.	"Born to Win, Pt. 1"	2:51
10.	"Something's Wrong"	3:20
Total length:		38:42

== Personnel ==
Musicians

- Alynda Segarra – vocals (all tracks); acoustic guitar
- Sam Doores – drums (tracks 1,2), gitar (track 7)
- Warren David Grant — drums (tracks 2)

Technical

- Sam Doores – production, engineering
- Alynda Segarra – production, engineering
- Producer – Alynda Lee Segarra, Andrija Tokic, Sam Doores

=== Cover ===
- Design – Gregory Good
- Layout – Gregory Good
- Photography by Paul Lingerfelt
