= Young Blood Blues =

Studio album by Hooray for the Riff Raff
- Released: January 1 2010
- Genre: Americana
- Length: 43 minutes
- Label: self-released

Hooray for the Riff Raff chronology
It Don't Mean I Don't Love You (2008)	Young Blood Blues (2010)	Look Out Mama (2012)

Young Blood Blues was self-produced and self-released in New Orleans in 2010. It was dedicated to the memory of Sali Ratty Grace also known as Marcella Grace Eiler.

== Background ==
In 2011, the UK record label released Hurray for the Riff Raff, a compilation of Young Blood Blues and 2008's I Don't Mean I Don't Love You.

Segarra had worked with Walt McClements on this and the previous records but this would be their last record together. Segarra told UNCUT Magazine in 2014 that one could hear that they were at a "crossroads" in songs like "Take Me" and "Young Blood Blues".

== Critical reception ==
Ann Powers of NPR Music said Segarra is "one of the most adventurous spirits to ever come out of the Americana music scene".

OffBeat Magazine's review of Young Blood Blues noted that "While not a traditional blues record, the energized and foreboding Depression-era folk juxtaposed against tales of love lost, drug addiction, and grisly murder ensure that the album’s title is a fitting one, and that the band has made the most of its second chance".

Reviler gave a mixed review, and ended it with "Hurray For The Riff Raff are a very talented, criminally under-known band who have the chops to be playing much larger stages".

== Track listing ==
All tracks are written by Alynda Mariposa Segarra.

No.	Title	Length
1.	"Is That You?"	3:46
2.	"Slow Walk"	3:17
3.	"Lately in dm"	4:52
4.	"I Know You"	2:54
5.	"Young Blood Blues"	6:23
6.	"Too Much Of A Good Thing"	5:29
7.	"Take Me"	3:46
8.	"Calmly"	4:41
9.	"Little Things"	3:40
10.	"Sali's Song"	4:21
Total length:		43 minutes

== Musicians ==
- Alynda Mariposa Segarra – guitar, lead vocals, banjo, piano
- Yosi Perlstein – shaker, fiddle, drums
- Misha – drums
- Aubrey B. Freeman – background vocals, bass guitar
- Walt McClements – fiddle, accordion, organ, trumpet
- Shae Freeman – background vocals
- Composition and lyrics: Alynda Mariposa Segarra
- Production and engineering: Alynda Mariposa Segarra
