= Fools for Light =

Studio album by El Cantador
- Released: 3 May 2011
- Recorded: December 2010–March 2011
- Genres: Indie rock, indie pop, dance-rock, experimental rock
- Labels: Mod Mobilian Records, This Is American Music
- Producer: El Cantador

Fools for Light is the first full-length album by El Cantador, released on May 3, 2011. Recording the album took place over eleven days in a beachside home in December 2010, with additional recording sessions until March 2011 in Mobile, Alabama. Fools for Light was self-produced and mixed by El Cantador's Alex Scharr and Sean Murphy at Glenwood Studios in Mobile. Fools for Light was mastered by Roger Seibel, known for his work with Broken Social Scene and Death Cab for Cutie, at SAE Mastering in Phoenix, Arizona. The album was re-released in 2013 by Mod Mobilian Records and This Is American Music.

Album artwork and layout was designed by Richard Humphreys and Brent Roche at Dog on Fire Design, friends of the band.

== Track listing ==
1. "There's a Hole" – 6:51
2. "The Brakes" – 4:09
3. "If Heaven/Sweet Crimes" – 4:15
4. "Empty Carz" – 3:01
5. "Allie Mae" – 4:28
6. "Mammoth" – 3:22
7. "PRP" – 2:46
8. "Dull Age" – 3:44
9. "Fools for Light" – 5:13
10. "Weak Ends" – 4:54

== Personnel ==
Those involved in the making of Fools for Light are:

El Cantador

- Heath Underwood – vocals, guitars
- Sean Murphy – drums, percussion, vocals
- Alex Scharr – bass, synthesizers, vocals

Production

- El Cantador – producer, engineer
- Alex Scharr – mixing
- Sean Murphy – mixing
- Roger Seibel – mastering

Design

- Richard Humphreys – artwork, layout
- Brent Roche – artwork, layout
