= Translation Wave =

Studio album by El Cantador
- Released: 26 February 2013
- Recorded: May–August 2012
- Genre: Indie rock, indie pop, dance-rock, experimental rock
- Label: Mod Mobilian Records, This Is American Music
- Producer: El Cantador

Translation Wave is the fifth extended play (EP) by El Cantador, released on February 26, 2013.

== Track listing ==
All songs written and performed by El Cantador. All lyrics by Heath Underwood (except "Ennui," written by Underwood and Lesley Smith Jones)

1. "Black Sound" – 2:25
2. "My Way" – 3:56
3. "Ennui" – 3:04
4. "Particle and Wave" – 5:53
5. "Reynosa" – 3:20
6. "Pilgrims" – 5:03

== Recording ==
El Cantador took residence at the Mary C. O'Keefe Cultural Center of Arts and Education in Ocean Springs, MS for a total of six days in May and September 2012 to work on Translation Wave. With access to the building's Scharr-Ello studio, performance arts room, and main theater the trio was once again free to explore their sound within high ceilings and stairwells in one of the coast's most richly and artistically diversified areas. Chris Staples (TwoThirtyEight, Discover America, Telekinesis) was invited in to engineer three of the EP's more percussion oriented tracks (BlackSound, Particle and Wave, Reynosa).

== Style ==
In this new collection of music we find a more intimate, cinematic, and sporadic group of songs. Translation Wave is an expression of how a band can morph and evolve from time on the road and turn to reflect on those experiences through instrumentation. Having already freed themselves of popular expectations on the previous album, El Cantador appears willing and able to take us anywhere at any time without notice.

In the EP's first track, "BlackSound", the listener is greeted by a sparse and intricately picked out acoustic guitar riff alongside Underwood's immediate foretelling to "Don't buy into most of my dreams/I'll make your head spin with my own disconnectivity" - lyrics which imply Underwood's satisfaction in playing with language and could serve to intimate the EP's darker hues and cathartic uplifts. Translation Wave proudly hums with a warmth and rawness akin to older classic albums you might find in your local record bin.

== Personnel ==
Those involved in the making of Translation Wave are:

El Cantador

- Sean Murphy – drums, percussion
- Alex Scharr – bass, piano, synths, vocals
- Heath Underwood – guitar/vocals/electric piano on "Ennui"

Production

- El Cantador – producer, engineer
- Chris Staples - engineer
- Alex Scharr – mixing
- Sean Murphy – mixing
- Bill Roberts – mastering

Design

- Richard Humphreys – artwork, layout
