= Any Old Iron =

Any Old Iron may refer to:

- Rag and bone man
- Any Old Iron (novel), a 1989 historical novel by Anthony Burgess
- "Any Old Iron" (song), a British music hall song

== See also ==
- Se compran colchones
