= Eilers =

Eilers is a surname. Notable people with the surname include:

- Anton Eilers (1839–1917), German-born American entrepreneur
- Arthur E. Eilers (1888–1958), former commissioner of the Missouri Valley Conference and coach at Washington University in St. Louis
- Dave Eilers (born 1936), American former Major League Baseball pitcher
- Elfriede Eilers (1921–2016), German politician (SPD)
- Emma Eilers (1870–1951), American painter
- Henry A. Eilers (1870–1901), United States Navy sailor and Medal of Honor recipient
- Justin Eilers (1978–2008), American mixed martial arts fighter
- Justin Eilers (footballer) (born 1988), German footballer
- Leonard Eilers (1898–1996), American storyteller, actor
- Pat Eilers (born 1966), American former National Football League player
- Sally Eilers (1908–1978), American actress
- Wilhelm Eilers (1906–1989), German Iranist

== See also ==
- Eiler, a list of people with the surname or given name
