= Eilersen =

Eilersen is a Nordic surname. It is related to Scandinavian family name etymology.

== List of people with the surname ==
- Eiler Eilersen Hagerup (1718–1789), Norwegian theologian
- Eiler Rasmussen Eilersen (1827–1912), Danish landscape painter
- Susanne Eilersen (born 1964), Danish politician

== See also ==
- Iversen (surname)
- Eilers
