= Two Cow Garage =

- Origin: Columbus, Ohio U.S.
- Genres: Alternative country Alternative rock
- Years active: 2001–present
- Labels: Shelterhouse Records; Suburban Home Records; Last Chance Records
- Website: TwoCowGarage.com

Two Cow Garage is an American band from Columbus, Ohio.

== History ==
The group was formed in September 2001 by the singer/guitarist Micah Schnabel (born in Bucyrus, Ohio), who began playing with the drummer Dustin Harigle in and around Columbus. Guitarist Chris Flint joined the group after seeing one of their early shows, and bass guitarist Shane Sweeney joined soon after. The group released its first album in 2002 and embarked on a near-constant nationwide U.S. tour, travelling over 300,000 miles.

Micah Schnabel (left) and Shane Sweeney of Two Cow Garage perform in Pittsburgh, Pa. in June 2012. (Photo by Greg Brown)

Their second album, The Wall Against Our Back, came out in 2004 to considerable critical acclaim, and the group's tour was recorded by John Boston and released as a documentary, The Long Way Around: One Badass Year With Two Cow Garage.

A third album, III, was released in 2007 and followed by Speaking In Cursive in September 2008. Harigle left the band on tour in 2007; drummer Cody Smith and keyboard player Andy Schell joined for Speaking In Cursive, which was released on the Colorado-based Suburban Home Records label.

The band's fifth album, Sweet Saint Me, was released via Suburban Home Records on October 24, 2010. The Death Of The Self Preservation Society was released September 10, 2013. Production of the album was funded by fans via a campaign on Indiegogo that raised $16,840.

A subsequent Indiegogo campaign raised $9,196 after the band's van broke down.

In 2015, the band recruited Nashville, Tennessee-based guitarist/singer/songwriter Todd Farrell Jr. (of Benchmarks, Todd Farrell Jr. & the Dirty Birds) as a permanent lead guitarist for the band.

In 2015, the band found its own stolen touring equipment for sale on eBay.

In June 2016, it was announced that the band would release their seventh album, titled Brand New Flag, via Last Chance Records in August 2016. The record was recorded and produced in Spring of 2016 in Kingston Springs, TN by guitarist Todd Farrell Jr., and mixed by Joey Kneiser (of rock band Glossary). On July 22, the band announced via their Facebook page that the original August 19 release date was pushed back to October 14.

In June 2017, guitarist Todd Farrell Jr. stepped away from the band in order to focus on his band, Benchmarks. Jay Gasper (Lydia Loveless) joined as a temporary fill-in guitarist for the remainder of their 2017 touring. Later that year, drummer David Murphy also left the band.

The band has built its following via energetic live shows and relentless touring, playing as many as 200 shows in a year.

== Members ==
- Micah Schnabel - lead vocals, guitar
- Shane Sweeney - lead vocals, bass guitar
- Dustin Harigle - drums (left in 2007)
- Chris Flint - guitar (left in 2007)
- Andy Schell - keyboards (left in 2011)
- Cody Smith - drums (left in 2011)
- David Murphy - backing vocals, drums (left in 2017)
- Todd Farrell Jr. - backing vocals, guitar (left in 2017)

== Discography ==
- Please Turn the Gas Back On (Shelterhouse Records, 2002)
- The Wall Against Our Back (Shelterhouse, 2004)
- III (Shelterhouse, 2007)
- Speaking In Cursive (Shelterhouse/Suburban Home, 2008)
- Sweet Saint Me (Suburban Home, 2010)
- The Death Of The Self Preservation Society (Last Chance Records, 2013)
- Brand New Flag (Last Chance Records, 2016)
