= Live Forever (Hurray for the Riff Raff album) =

Live album by Hurray for the Riff Raff
- Released: March 20, 2026
- Recorded: July 17–18, 2025
- Genre: Alternative
- Length: 68:26
- Label: Nonesuch
- Producer: Johnny Wilson

Hurray for the Riff Raff chronology
The Past Is Still Alive (2024)	Live Forever (2026)

Live Forever is the first live album by American band Hurray for the Riff Raff. Recorded during performances at Old Town School of Folk Music in Chicago on July 17–18, 2025, the album was produced by Chicago-based musician Johnny Wilson.

== Background ==
Hurray for the Riff Raff leader Alynda Segarra moved to Chicago in 2024 after spending nearly twenty years living in New Orleans. After touring with Chicago based musicians Nnamdi Ogbonnaya and Sen Morimoto, Segarra concluded it was "the best band I’ve ever had" and started living in Chicago to work together with the members and perform. They call the album a "love letter to working-class musicians".

Live Forever includes live versions of all of the songs on Hurray for the Riff Raff's 2024 studio release, The Past Is Still Alive.

== Track listing ==
All songs by Hurray for the Riff Raff.

1. "Alibi" – 3:18
2. "Hawkmoon" – 3:33
3. "Rhododendron" – 4:10
4. "Dynamo" – 3:56
5. "Buffalo" – 5:11
6. "Colossus of Roads" – 3:07
7. "Snake Plant (The Past Is Still Alive)" – 5:15
8. "Precious Cargo" – 5:54
9. "Pyramid Scheme" – 3:15
10. "Vetiver" – 4:58
11. "The World Is Dangerous" – 6:26
12. "Hourglass" – 4:32
13. "Ogallala" – 6:36
14. "Pa'lante" – 8:15

== Personnel ==
Credits adapted from the album's download page and label journal.

=== Musicians ===
- Alynda Segarra – lead vocals
- Parker Grogan – electric guitar, vocals
- Nnamdi Ogbonnaya – bass, backing vocals
- Marcus Drake – drums
- Sen Morimoto – saxophone, keyboards

=== Production ===
- Johnny Wilson – producer, editor, mixing
- Steve Marek – recording, editor, mixing
- Heba Kadry – mastering
- Jacob Clements – assistant mastering engineer

== Charts ==
Chart performance for Live Forever
Chart (2026)	Peak position
UK Americana Albums (OCC)	18
UK Album Downloads (OCC)	62
