= Eiler =

Eiler is a masculine given name and a surname. Notable people with the name include:

== Given name ==
- Eiler Rasmussen Eilersen (1827–1912), Danish painter
- Eiler Grubbe (1532–1585), Danish Master of Finances, Chancellor of Denmark and member of the Council of the Realm
- Eiler Eilersen Hagerup (1718–1789), Bishop of Bjørgvin and Christianssand in Norway
- Eiler Hansen Hagerup (1685–1743), Bishop of Nidaros in Norway
- Eiler Hagerup (politician) (1736–1795), Norwegian politician and county governor of Finnmark, son of the above
- Eiler Holck (1627–1696), Danish baron and major general
- Eiler Holm (1904–1987), Danish amateur footballer
- Eiler Andreas Jorgensen (1838–1876), Danish-American painter
- Eiler Larsen (1890–1975), Danish vagabond who earned fame as "The Greeter" of Laguna Beach, California
- Eiler Hagerup Krog Prytz Sr. (1812–1900), Norwegian bailiff and politician
- Eiler Hagerup Krog Prytz Jr. (1883–1963), Norwegian goldsmith, nephew of the above

== Surname ==
- Elis Eiler (born 1990), Liechtensteiner footballer
- Elsie Eiler (born 1933), only resident of Monowi, Nebraska
- Lorraine Eiler (1934–2021), Australian basketball player
- Marcella Grace Eiler (1987–2008), American social activist who was murdered in Mexico

== See also ==
- Eilers, a list of people with the surname
