= The Navigator (Hurray for the Riff Raff album) =

Studio album by Hurray for the Riff Raff
- Released: March 10, 2017
- Recorded: 2016
- Studios: Electric Lady Studios (Greenwich Village, New York); Panoramic House (West Marin, California)
- Genres: Americana; folk
- Length: 40:34
- Label: ATO
- Producer: Paul Butler

Hurray for the Riff Raff chronology
Small Town Heroes (2014)	The Navigator (2017)	Life on Earth (2022)

Singles from The Navigator
- 1. "Rican Beach" Released: 18 December 18, 2016; 2. "Hungry Ghost" Released: January 16, 2017; 3. "Living in the City" Released: August 27, 2017

The Navigator is the sixth studio album by American indie rock band Hurray for the Riff Raff. It was released by ATO Records on March 10, 2017. The album was recorded in 2016 at Electric Lady Studios in New York City and Panoramic House in West Marin with producer Paul Butler, a member of the band The Bees. The band's frontperson Alynda Mariposa Segarra used The Navigator to explore themes of excessive gentrification, with the record featuring a storyline. On release, the album received positive reviews from music critics.

== Background ==
By the end of 2014, Hurray for the Riff Raff had managed to gain a wider audience following the successes of Small Town Heroes. Rather than immediately follow it up quickly by recording another album, frontperson Alynda Mariposa Segarra used the opportunity to travel back to their ancestral homelands in Puerto Rico and reconnect with their roots. Much of the album was inspired by their travels. They witnessed the effects that both the debt crisis and continual environmental damage had done to the communities, as well as the way Puerto Rican culture had continued to flourish despite the hardships that had been endured.

Segarra also returned to their childhood hometown in The Bronx to see how gentrification had affected the area since they had left to start their music career. These changes would also become central to the themes covered within the album. After returning from their travels, Segarra and the rest of the band decided to relocate from New Orleans to Nashville in order to start writing the new album.

== Writing and recording ==
Segarra conceived The Navigator with a storyline following the protagonist Navita in an overgentrified city in the future. They based the character on themself as a 16-year old street kid. As They later told Drowned in Sound:

She's this very independent spirit, a tough girl. She feels very suffocated by the city, the poverty and how everyone is cramped together. She has this overwhelming feeling that something is wrong. And she's also very ashamed of where she comes from. So that's where The Navigator begins. She wants to escape. It's like this Wizard of Oz story: Navi asks this wise woman to wake up the next day without remembering or recognizing anyone or anything. So this woman puts her to sleep for forty years; she then wakes up in the same city. In this future, gentrification has gone rapid. And basically in my mind, Trump is mayor in this place. I thought about this very extreme dictator-like figure who wants to separate everyone. Someone who wants to get all people of color and the poor out of certain neighborhoods to somewhere remote.

Once writing the album had been completed, the band then spent most of 2016 recording the album at Electric Lady Studios in New York and Panoramic House in West Marin. The band asked Paul Butler to produce the album, based on his work with British soul singer Michael Kiwanuka. Butler was hired with the aim to recapture the same sound he had brought to Kirwanuka's albums and combine it with the various musical influences of the places Segarra had visited. To accomplish the task an ensemble of musicians were brought in, including percussionist Juan-Carlos Chaurand and Devendra Banhart's drummer Gregory Rogove.

Segarra said, "I was listening to Kendrick Lamar a lot during the making of The Navigator. I started writing the lyrics for [the title] track on my phone, with no music. That's the part of the album where Navita starts to transform. I wanted it to sound very cinematic. I listened to a lot of Jorge Ben Jor too, especially his album Força Bruta. The strings on that album are gorgeous."

== Release and promotion ==
The album was announced on December 5, 2016 alongside the release of the video for lead single 'Rican Beach'. Details on the tour to support the album were also listed, as well as a statement from Segarra regarding the album. In the statement Segarra wrote, "This is dedicated to the water protectors of Standing Rock—thank you for your bravery and giving us hope. Also, to the people of Peñuelas, Puerto Rico, who are demanding an end to the AES dumping of coal ash which leads to water contamination—we are with you."

Two additional songs were taken from the album in order to promote it. The first of these two songs, 'Hungry Ghost' was released on January 6, 2017. Following the album's release in March, the final single - 'Living in the City' was unveiled on August 29, 2017.

For the Billboard charting week of April 1, 2017, The Navigator was the No. 2 album sold in the breaking-and-entry category by the Heatseekers Albums. In addition, the album was the No. 9 most sold Independent Albums, and it was the No. 7 most sold Top Tastemaker Albums. It also sold enough copies to attain No. 43 on the Top Rock Albums chart.

== Critical reception ==
Professional ratings
Aggregate scores
Source	Rating
AnyDecentMusic?	8.3/10
Metacritic	83/100
Review scores
Source	Rating
AllMusic	4/5 stars
The Guardian	4/5 stars
The Independent	4/5 stars
Mojo	4/5 stars
NME	4/5 stars
The Observer	5/5 stars
Pitchfork	8.1/10
Q	4/5 stars
Rolling Stone	4/5 stars
Uncut	9/10

The Navigator received positive appraisal from music critics upon release. At Metacritic, the album holds a score of an 83 out of 100 based upon 18 selected independent ratings and reviews, which indicates "universal acclaim".

At AllMusic, Stephen Thomas Erlewine wrote, "The Navigator is nothing if it isn't a bold risk, a record that attempts to carve out a new kind of Americana, one where the past informs the present instead of the present preserving the past -- and one where the political is personal, too." Caroline Sullivan was similarly positive in her review for The Guardian stating; "Segarra personalises the political by foregrounding her Hispanic roots. If that sounds as if it’s a recipe for unmitigated worthiness, be assured that folk melodies and wild-hearted Latin beats play as big a role as Segarra's flamethrower polemics" Writing for The Independent, Andy Gill claimed, "[Segarra] effectively expands the notion of Americana to accommodate another cultural strain alongside the usual blues and country influences."

Writing for NME, Leonie Cooper said that, despite its serious subject matter, the album "doesn't deliver its message with a po-face. 'Living in the City' is a fun doo-wop number while the title track is a sultry slice of mid-1980s Tom Waits-ian southern gothic. Hurray for the Riff Raff indeed." Kitty Empire also praised the album in a five-star review for The Observer: "The Navigator might be full of site-specific anger and yearning, but like its predecessors, it is incredibly easy on the ear. The songs just flow--slinky, sad or elegant in their own ways." In a review for Pitchfork, contributor Matthew Ismael Ruiz commended the album too, commenting that "The Navigator is ostensibly a rock'n'roll record, but it expands Segarra's palette beyond the folk/country/blues lane she's thus far occupied."

In his review for Q, Andrew Perry felt that "The Navigator feels like a mighty, empowering antidote to 2017's many spiritual agonies." Laura Snapes' article for Uncut also related the album to the contemporary political climate: "Segarra is skilled at identifying the shifting goalposts that immigrants have to live by, and staring past them." Writing for Rolling Stone, editor Will Hermes simply stated, "This is proudly intersectional folk music". For Vice, Robert Christgau named "Living in the City", "Pa'lante", and "Rican Beach" as highlights while writing of Segarra, "Bronx Puerto Rican emigrates to New Orleans, where she crystallizes a rock group fit to declaim her story".

== Track listing ==
All music is composed by Alynda Mariposa Segarra, except where noted

The Navigator track listing
No.	Title	Music	Length
1.	"Entrance"		1:43
2.	"Living in the City"		3:16
3.	"Hungry Ghost"		3:25
4.	"Life to Save"		2:56
5.	"Nothing's Gonna Change That Girl"		4:00
6.	"The Navigator"		3:07
7.	"Halfway There"		2:11
8.	"Rican Beach"		3:32
9.	"Fourteen Floors"		4:13
10.	"Settle"		2:57
11.	"Pa'lante"	Alynda Mariposa Segarra, Pedro Pietri	5:53
12.	"Finale"	Alynda Mariposa Segarra, Yvarume Tapia	3:21
Total length:			40:34

- The audio at the beginning of "The Navigator" (Se compran colchones) is a clip commonly heard in Latin America (especially Mexico City)
- "Pa'lante" includes lines and audio of Pedro Pietri's poem, "Puerto Rican Obituary"

== Personnel ==
=== Hurray for the Riff Raff ===
- Alynda Mariposa Segarra – vocals, guitar, percussion, piano
- Caitlin Gray – bass, upright piano, vocals
- Jordan Hyde – guitar
- Greg Rogove – drums
- Paul Butler – keys, guitar
- Juan Carlos Chaurand – congas and bongos

=== Additional musicians ===
- Juan-Carlos Chaurand – bongos, congas
- Claudia Chopek – viola, violin
- Mthakathi Ema – vocals
- Phil Granito – vocals
- Norka Hernandez – drums
- Joel Katz – vocals
- Gregory Rogove – drums, percussion, vocals
- Jose Santiago – drums
- Patricia Santos – cello
- Jonathan Troncoso – drums
- Yva Las Vegass – guitar, vocals

=== Production ===
- Beatriz Artola – engineer
- Michael H. Brauer – mixing
- Paul Butler – drums, guitar, percussion, producer, synthesizer, vocals
- Phil Joly – engineer
- Jon Kaplan – mixing
- Barry McCready – assistant engineer
- Jon McMullen – engineer
- Seth Paris – assistant engineer
- Doug Van Sloun – mastering
- Steve Vealey – mixing

=== Artwork ===
- Ricardo Alessio – art direction
- Sarrah Danziger – photography
- Maria Silver – artwork, design

== Charts ==
Chart performance for The Navigator
Chart (2017)	Peak position
Belgian Albums (Ultratop Flanders)	133
New Zealand Heatseekers Albums (RMNZ)	10
Scottish Albums (Official Charts)	58
UK Albums (Official Charts)	76
US Independent Albums (Billboard)	9
US Top Rock Albums (Billboard)	43
