= Slobberbone =

American alt-country band

Slobberbone The Drams
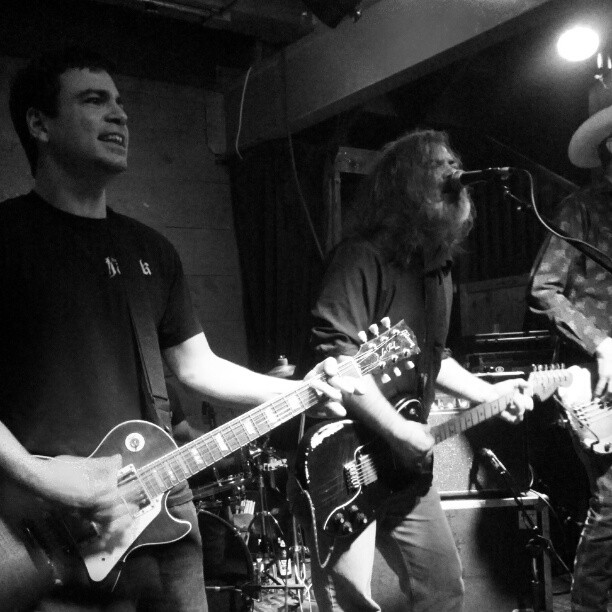
- Slobberbone at White Water Tavern in Little Rock, AR in 2012

Background information
- Origin: Denton, Texas, United States
- Genres: Alt-country; Rock
- Years active: Slobberbone; 1992–2005; 2006–2014; The Drams; 2005–2006; Brent Best; 2015–present
- Labels: Doolittle Records; New West Records; Last Chance Records; Transient Camp Recordings
- Members: Slobberbone; Brent Best; Cody Garcia; Tony Harper; Brian Lane; The Drams; Brent Best; Tony Harper; Keith Killoren; Chad Stockslager
- Past members: Jess Barr (Slobberbone guitarist); Mike Hill (Slobberbone guitarist); Lee Parsons (Slobberbone bass player); Scott Danbom (Slobberbone keys/violin)
- Website: slobberbone.com

Slobberbone is an American alt-country band from Denton, Texas, led by singer-songwriter Brent Best, Cody Garcia, Tony Harper, and Brian Lane. Best continues to tour as a solo act, performing both songs by Slobberbone and The Drams, and songs from his solo record, but also reunites with both bands for shows with full band line-ups.

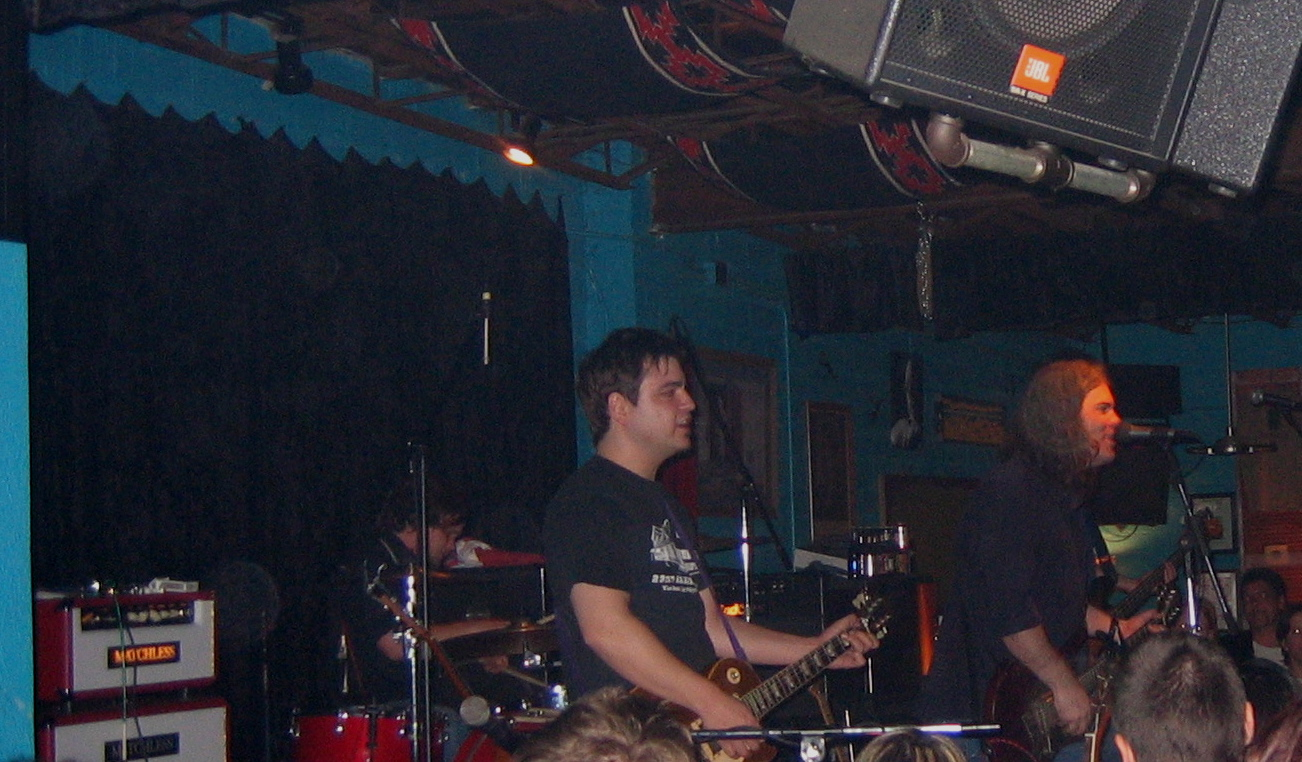
Jess Barr and Brent Best at Dan's Silverleaf in 2005

== History ==
Slobberbone formed in early 1992 in Denton, Texas, where the band played for beer and had their first gig at the Park 'n' Go, a beer store in Denton. The best-known line-up consisted of singer-songwriter Brent Best on guitar and lead vocals, Jess Barr on lead guitar, Brian Lane on bass guitar, and drummer Tony Harper. The band members met after attending University of North Texas, where they lived in a house together and played local shows in Denton. Bassist Brian Lane joined the band in 1996 and guitarist Jess Barr in 1997. They eventually signed with the Austin-based record label Doolittle Records (which eventually merged with New West Records). Their name is a reference to a dog's chew bone.

From 1995 onwards, Slobberbone as a band solidified its lineup and began playing shows outside of Texas, becoming known for its extensive touring schedule across the United States.

Jeff Cole from Doolittle Records produced the first two Slobberbone records. Jim Dickinson, who among other work is known for The Replacements, produced Everything You Thought Was Right Was Wrong Today, working with the band to record at Ardent Studios in Memphis, Tennessee.

Don Smith, of Tommy Stinson's Bash & Pop and Cracker, produced Slippage in Los Angeles, California.

In early 2005, the band announced that it was calling it quits because Lane was moving to Florida. Slobberbone played a series of shows for their farewell tour.

In 2009, the band (with the 2005 lineup) reunited for a series of shows. At the end of 2009, the re-formed band, with Lane returned to Texas from Florida, announced that they planned on recording a new album in 2010 before going on another tour. In May 2011, the band's drummer posted a blog entry stating that the planned mini-tour and merchandise sales would help fund the band's long-anticipated album.

Outside of the United States, the band is popular in the Netherlands, where Slobberbone has toured intensively in the main clubs and on festivals since 1998.

== The Drams ==
In 2005, most of the band's members re-formed as The Drams when Best was scheduled to play a full band show as a solo act. Two members from Denton, Texas' Budapest One, Keith Killoren and Chad Schlockslager, are members of The Drams. The Drams play rock with background vocals and keyboards. Their record, Jubilee Dive, was produced by Centro-Matic's Matt Pence and came out on mini-major New West Records.

== Brent Best ==
Best was born on September 1, 1970, in Austin, Texas, although his family moved to a nearby small town in Texas shortly after. When he was young he played in a band with his friend, singer-songwriter Kevin Kerby, from his teenage years onwards. They had a two-man band which they described as "Black Grass" that was called Sad Monkey Railroad. Best was able to co-write with Kerby, and produced the first self-released Slobberbone record with him.

In 2015, Best released a solo record called Your Dog, Champ on Last Chance Records. The record, which began in April 2010, took five years to make and was crowdfunded. The record was well received. Grady Don Sandlin played drums and Ralph White (Bad Livers), Petra Kelly, Scott Danbom (Centro-Matic, Sarah Jaffe) and Claude Bernard (The Gourds) also contributed to the record.

Best contributed the song "Robert Cole" to the Bloodshot Records compilation Just One More, A Musical Tribute to Larry Brown.

== Recognition ==
Stephen King mentioned the band's song "Gimme Back My Dog" in his novel Black House. He also listed the song as one of the top three greatest rock and roll songs ever in his column in Entertainment Weekly. Although never publicly confirmed, the album Slippage could very well be Slobberbone's nod to King. The word "slippage" is important in Black House. King also mentions Slobberbone as a favorite of protagonist Richard Sifkitz in the novella Stationary Bike.

Drive-By Truckers frontman Patterson Hood sang on the Slobberbone song "Lazy Guy" on Everything You Thought Was Right Was Wrong Today. Slobberbone often toured with the Drive-By Truckers early in both bands' careers.

== Discography ==
=== Slobberbone ===
- 1994: Crow Pot Pie (self-released)
- 1996: Crow Pot Pie (Doolittle); contains different songs than original
- 1997: Limited Edition EP (Doolittle)
- 1997: Barrel Chested (Doolittle / New West Records)
- 1998: Your Excuse Live EP (Doolittle / New West Records)
- 2000: Everything You Thought Was Right Was Wrong Today (New West Records)
- 2002: Slippage (New West Records)
- 2016: Bees and Seas: The Best of Slobberbone (New West Records)

==== Compilations ====
- 1997: "Dark as a Dungeon" by Merle Travis on Straight Outta Boone County Cowboy Songs, Home Songs, Western Songs, Mountain Songs (Bloodshot Records)
- 1999: "Scuffed" on Band-Kits: A Compilation of Denton, Texas Music (Quality Park)
- 1999: "Piece of Crap" by Neil Young on This Note's for You Too! A Tribute to Neil Young (Interstate Records)
- 2005: "Some New Town" by Bruce Springsteen on Thunder Road Tracks Inspired by the Boss (Uncut)
- 2010: "Placemat Blues" on Suburban Home Records Mixtape 5: Someone's Gonna Die (Suburban Home)

=== The Drams ===
- 2006: Jubilee Dive (New West Records)

=== Brent Best ===
- 2015: Your Dog, Champ (Transient Camp Recordings for Last Chance Records)
