= Life on Earth (Hurray for the Riff Raff album) =

2022 studio album by Hurray for the Riff Raff

Studio album by Hurray for the Riff Raff
- Released: February 18, 2022
- Length: 40:10
- Label: Nonesuch
- Producer: Brad Cook

Hurray for the Riff Raff chronology
The Navigator (2017)	Life on Earth (2022)	The Past Is Still Alive (2024)

Life on Earth is the seventh studio album by Hurray for the Riff Raff, released on February 18, 2022, through Nonesuch Records, their first release through the label. It received acclaim from critics.

== Critical reception ==
Professional ratings
Aggregate scores
Source	Rating
AnyDecentMusic?	8.1/10
Metacritic	87/100
Review scores
Source	Rating
AllMusic	4.5/5 stars
The A.V. Club	8.3/10
Beats Per Minute	8.4/10
God Is in the TV	9/10
The Line of Best Fit	9/10
Paste	8.3/10
Pitchfork	8.3/10

Life on Earth received a score of 87 out of 100 on review aggregator Metacritic based on 13 critics' reviews, indicating "universal acclaim". Editors at aggregator AnyDecentMusic? summarized the reviews as an 8.1 out of 10.

Pitchfork's review of the album mentioned that Alynda Segarra's work has never sounded more honest and self-possessed. Paste magazine's review of Life On Earth declared "What matters are the travails we endure to appreciate goodness. Life on Earth is a journey through the former toward the latter, and a dazzling shift from Hurray for the Riff Raff’s roots to their present."

== Track listing ==
All tracks are written by Alynda Segarra.

Life on Earth track listing
No.	Title	Length
1.	"Wolves"	3:36
2.	"Pierced Arrows"	4:02
3.	"Pointed at the Sun"	3:32
4.	"Rhododendron"	3:34
5.	"Jupiter's Dance"	2:35
6.	"Life on Earth"	5:46
7.	"Nightqueen" (featuring Ocean Vuong)	3:38
8.	"Precious Cargo"	4:42
9.	"Rosemary Tears"	3:16
10.	"Saga"	4:35
11.	"Kin"	0:50
Total length:		40:10

== Charts ==
Chart performance for Life on Earth
Chart (2022)	Peak position
Scottish Albums (OCC)	19
UK Album Downloads (OCC)	28
