= Roger Hoover =

American singer-songwriter

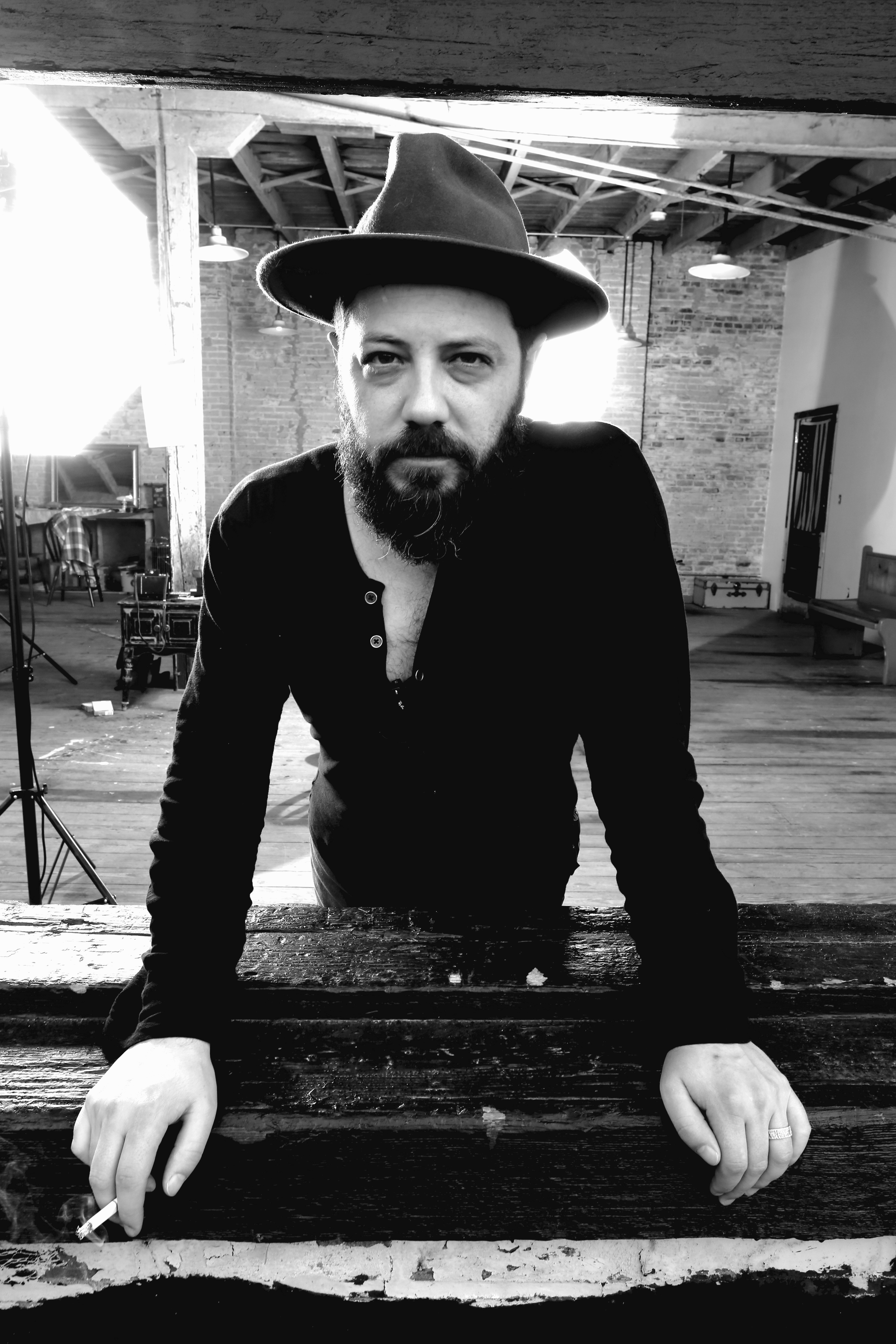
- Songwriter Roger Hoover photographed by Nate Burrell

Background information
- Born: December 7, 1978 (age 47); St. Petersburg, Florida, United States
- Origin: Akron, Ohio
- Genres: Americana, blues, folk
- Occupations: Songwriter, guitarist, singer, photographer, graphic designer
- Years active: 2001–present
- Labels: Hayfever Records; Bandaloop Records; Last Chance Records
- Website: www.rogerhoover.com www.rogerhoover.org www.lastchancerecords.com

Roger Hoover (born December 7, 1978) is a singer-songwriter and guitarist based in Kent, Ohio who blends American folk music, blues, and literate lyrics. He has been backed in various forms by the Whiskeyhounds, the Magpies, the Hurt, and the Western Reserve.

== Early life ==
Hoover was born in St. Petersburg, Florida, the son of Roger Lee Hoover and Kimberly Ann Hoover (née Vaughn). Hoover's father was an amateur boxer and printmaker, his mother was a secretary. When he was a baby they moved back to their home state of Ohio and settled in Barberton, Ohio.

When Hoover was 12 years old he started playing the guitar. He learned to play by listening to his father's record collection. At 15, Hoover would travel to Kent, OH to perform at Brady's Coffee alongside seasoned musicians Patrick Sweany, Eric Noden, and Andy Cohen. Hoover didn't begin writing songs until 2003, shortly after his father died. His first collections of songs, Golden Gloves, was dedicated to and inspired by his father.

== Career ==
Roger Hoover first gained prominence in the early 2000s as the songwriter, lead singer, and guitarist of 'The Whiskeyhounds'. His first collection of songs, Golden Gloves was released in 2002 on Hayfever Records. In 2004, Hoover and the Whiskeyhounds' follow-up release Panic Blues was picked up by Columbus-based Bandaloop Records. Upon release from Bandaloop Records in 2005 drummer Dave McKean (GC5) and bassist Doug McKean (GC5) were added and began recording a follow-up to Panic Blues.

Hoover's third and final album with the Whiskeyhounds, Jukebox Manifesto, was self-released in 2006. Engineered and produced by Ryan Foltz (Dropkick Murphys), Jukebox Manifesto captured Hoover and the Whiskeyhounds, in usual raucous form. Featuring lap steel (Freddy Hill), accordion/keyboards (Justin Gorski), and violin (Chris Yohn), Jukebox Manifesto received critical acclaim. According to Arkansas Times, Jukebox Manifesto was "one of the finest roots records since Ryan Adams' “Heartbreaker" or Gillian Welch's "Time: The Revelator.”

Roger Hoover then formed 'The Magpies', which released Eastern Standard Time in 2009, and Strangers, a collection of earlier recorded material, both produced and engineered again by Ryan Foltz. Last Chance Records released Live at the White Water Tavern (2011) featuring Hoover backed by the Magpies.

Following a brief break from music, Hoover assembled a backing band known as 'The Hurt' (Kevin Walters- Bass, BJ Barbieri – Drums, Daniel Holmes – Guitar) and released Lay My Rituals Down, the much anticipated follow-up to Eastern Standard Time, in 2012. In October 2012, The Rock and Roll Hall of Fame in Cleveland, Ohio invited Hoover to perform songs from the archives and donate his manuscripts to their collection.

Hoover continued to perform both solo and with the Hurt until early 2016. Following a successful Kickstarter campaign, Hoover recorded a new album entitled Pastures in January 2016, which will be released by Last Chance Records on October 7. Paste Magazine premiered the first single, "Something in My Heart" from Pastures on Friday, July 29. Hoover also established a new live touring band, which he refers to as the Western Reserve. In February 2016, Hoover signed a new recording contract with Little Rock, Arkansas-based Last Chance Records.

Pastures, Roger Hoover's sixth full-length album, was released by Last Chance Records on October 7, 2016. Paste Magazine debuted the first single, "Something in My Heart," saying that Hoover's "thoughtful meanderings take listeners through a map of contemplative, everyman’s observations in the vein of music history’s best storytellers, set in the fertile backdrop of the U.S. Midwest." No Depression praised the album as well, saying that Hoover is "a songwriter with Raymond Carver's observation and Kris Kristofferson's ear for poetry." Pastures is, according to a Pollstar interview on songwriting, "filled with tracks that are as poignant as they are easily accessible, the album echoes many of the songwriters that have influenced Hoover, such as Kris Kristofferson and John Prine. But more importantly, Pastures displays the talent of a rising artist whose music promises that the best is yet to come."

Roger Hoover formed creative design and marketing agency, Rust Creative, with his wife, Ysabel Hoover, in 2011.

=== Performance style ===
He is often described as writing "gritty Americana", "folk ballads", or "alt-country", and compared to artists like Tom Waits, Bruce Springsteen and Gillian Welch.

== Discography ==
=== Studio albums ===
- Golden Gloves (2002) as Roger Hoover & The Whiskeyhounds
- Panic Blues (2005) as Roger Hoover & The Whiskeyhounds
- Jukebox Manifesto (2006) as Roger Hoover & The Whiskeyhounds
- Eastern Standard Time (2008) as The Magpies
- Strangers (2010) as The Magpies
- Lay My Rituals Down (2012) as Roger Hoover & The Hurt
- Pastures (2016) as Roger Hoover

=== Live albums ===
- Live at White Water Tavern (2011) as Roger Hoover & the Magpies

=== EPs ===
- Jukebox Manifesto Demos (2004)
