= My Dearest Darkest Neighbor =

Studio album by Hurray for the Riff Raff
- Released: July 1, 2013
- Genre: Folk; indie rock
- Length: 55:37
- Label: Mod Mobilian Records/This Is American Music

Hurray for the Riff Raff chronology
Look Out Mama (2012)	My Dearest Darkest Neighbor (2013)	Small Town Heroes (2014)

My Dearest Darkest Neighbor is the fourth full-length album by New Orleans musical group Hurray for the Riff Raff. It was originally available only as a reward in a Kickstarter campaign to fund their previous album Look Out Mama, and in local record stores. A version of George Harrison's "My Sweet Lord" was included in the new release. The album was released July 1, 2013 by Mod Mobilian Records and This Is American Music.

== Track listing ==
1. "Delta Momma Blues" (Townes Van Zandt) – 3:48
2. "Fine and Mellow" (Billie Holiday) – 3:37
3. "My Morphine" (Gillian Welch) – 4:05
4. "Black Jack Davey" (Traditional) – 3:11
5. "Western Cowboy" (Lead Belly) – 4:42
6. "Jealous Guy" (John Lennon) – 3:27
7. "Just a Heart" (James Hand) – 3:34
8. "Angel Ballad" (Alynda Lee Segarra, based on the Gillian Welch composition "Ruination Day") – 6:06
9. "Cuckoo" (Segarra) – 3:34
10. "People Talkin'" (Lucinda Williams) – 3:52
11. "River" (Joni Mitchell) – 4:48
12. "I'm Goin' Away" (Elizabeth Cotten) – 2:19
13. "I'm So Lonesome I Could Cry" (Hank Williams) – 4:34
14. "My Sweet Lord" (George Harrison) – 4:00

== Personnel ==
- Alynda Lee Segarra – vocals, guitar
- Yosi Perlstein – fiddle, drums, percussion
- Sam Doores – drums (track 5), piano (track 6), guitar (#14)
- Dan Cutler – bass (tracks 5 and 14)
- Zach Setchfield – slide guitar (track 14)
- Andy Wilhite – organ (track 14)
