= El Cantador =

American rock band

- Origin: Mobile, Alabama
- Genres: Rock, pop, experimental rock, folk rock
- Years active: 2007–2015
- Labels: This is American Music
- Members: Heath Underwood; Sean Murphy; Alex Scharr
- Website: www.elcantador.com

El Cantador was an American rock band formed in 2007 in Mobile, Alabama, whose music spans numerous diverse genres, from dance-rock and folk to experimental rock. The band consisted of Heath Underwood (vocals, guitars), Sean Murphy (drums, percussion, vocals), and Alex Scharr (bass, synthesizers, vocals). They self-released several EPs including their debut Orange EP (2007) and a studio album Fools for Light, released on May 3, 2011.

In conjunction with Mod Mobilian Records, Fools for Light was re-released in 2013 on This is American Music, a Southern record label with whom El Cantador recently signed. On February 26, 2013 El Cantador released a new EP: Translation Wave.

== History ==
Mobile, Alabama's El Cantador hit the ground running in 2007 and has not paused to look back. What began as introspective folk influenced ballads (Orange EP 2007) and Americana tinged rock (The Ground EP 2008) has developed into more progressive and expressive compositions with moments of quiet clarity and upbeat reckless abandonment. Continuing in their search and exploration of new instruments and ideas, the band recorded their first full-length album Fools For Light (2011) across the street from the Gulf of Mexico and originally self-released under Friends Fight Records.

Recently, the band has joined with Atlanta's This Is American Music Label and Mobile’s Mod Mobilian Records for the re-release of Fools For Light and the release of their latest effort: Translation Wave. El Cantador consists of multi-instrumentalist Alex Scharr on electric bass, synthesizers, keys, and backing vocals; founding member Sean Murphy continues his role in as the lone drummer and percussionist; and the group's overall aesthetic is rounded out with founding member and guitarist Heath Underwood's songwriting and vocal performances.

With a focused strength in the craft of songwriting, El Cantador’s songs reflect often on a passionate inner-life that is at times intensely overwhelming and at war with itself; especially amongst universal themes of identity and acceptance into social and personal circles. This is not a band that will follow a crowd or shirk a bet for fear of risk. This is the band that will stay true to making their music their way, and they cordially, sincerely, invite you to join them.

El Cantador has shared the stage with the likes of Unknown Mortal Orchestra, Alabama Shakes, Cage The Elephant, Colour Revolt, Shovels & Rope, and many talented more. Past and recent music festivals include: SouthSounds Music Festival (2011 & 2012), the Hangout Beach and Music Festival (2010), 92 Zew’s Second Tuesday Series, Bayfest (2009), and Next Big Nashville (2009).

The band announced their separation with two farewell shows in 2015.

== Members ==
- Heath Underwood – vocals, guitars
- Sean Murphy – drums, percussion, vocals
- Alex Scharr – bass, synthesizers, vocals

== Discography ==
=== Albums ===
- Fools for Light (May 3, 2011)

=== EPs ===
- Orange EP (2007)
- The Ground EP (2008)
- Split EP w/ Johnny Apple-Eyes (2010)
- Live at the Blind Mule (2012)
- Translation Wave (February 26, 2013)

=== Singles ===
- "Glean" (2009)
