= American Aquarium =

American alternative country band

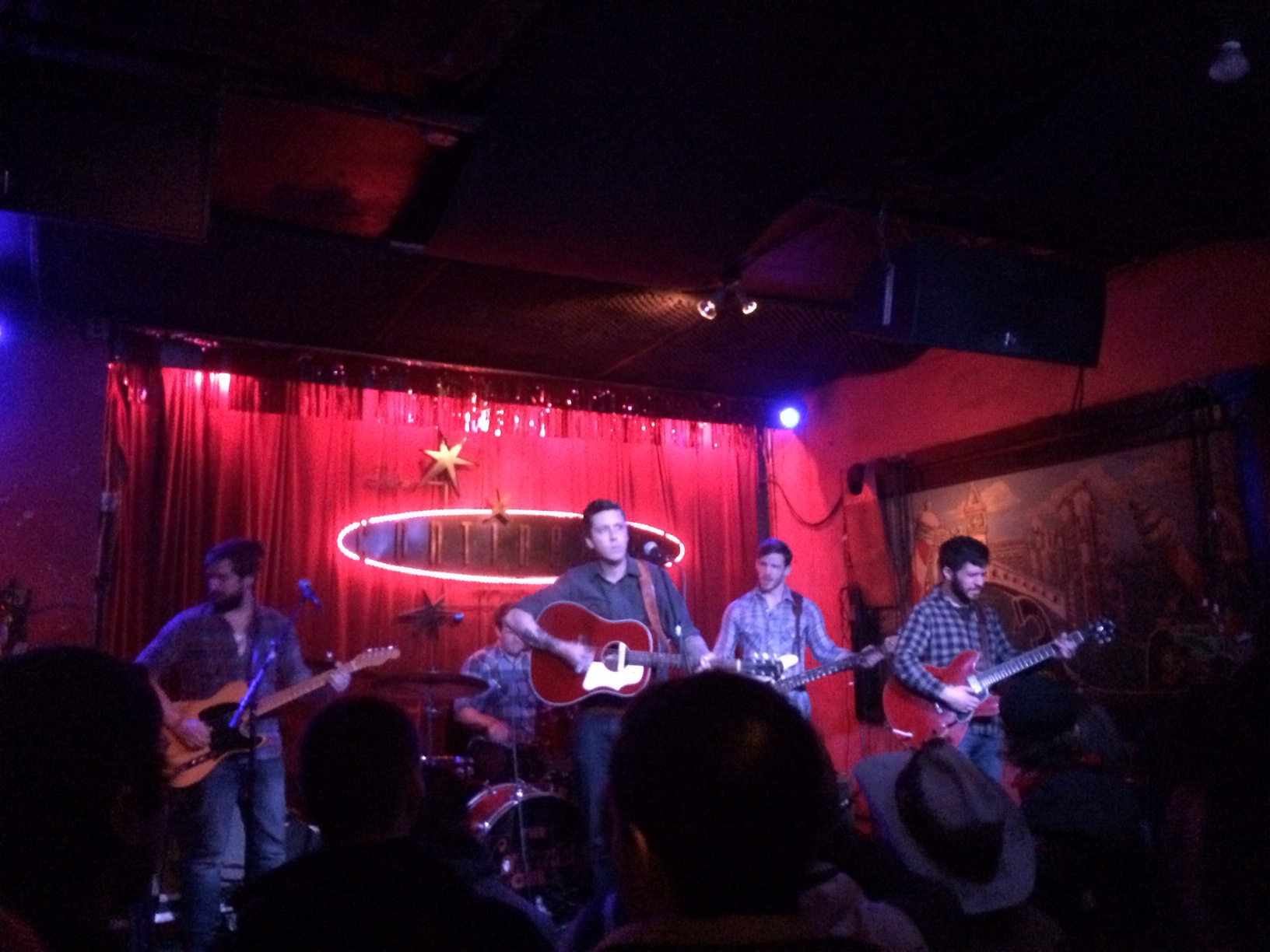
- American Aquarium at Continental Club in Austin, Texas of January 2015

Background information
- Origin: Raleigh, North Carolina, United States
- Genres: Rock, alternative country, Americana
- Years active: 2005–present
- Labels: Last Chance Records, Red 11 Music, New West Records
- Members: BJ Barham; Shane Boeker; Alden Hedges; Neil Jones; Hank Long; Ryan Van Fleet
- Past members: Colin DiMeo; Bill Corbin; Ryan Johnson; Kevin McClain; Whit Wright; Reid Shalvoy; Jay Shirley; Chris Hibbard; Zack Brown; Sarah Mann; Jeremy Aycock; Nevin Dawson; Joey Bybee; Adam Kurtz; Ben Hussey; Amos Baynes; Rhett Huffman
- Website: www.americanaquarium.com

American Aquarium is an American alternative country band from Raleigh, North Carolina, United States.

== Background ==
Formed in 2006, the band derived its name from the Wilco song, “I Am Trying to Break Your Heart,” and is led by band founder and lead vocalist/ guitarist BJ Barham. A new lineup was announced in April 2017 with new faces joining the ranks: Crooks drummer Joey Bybee, Damn Quails bass player Ben Hussey and guitarist Shane Boeker – all from Texas – along with Nashville pedal-steel player Adam Kurtz, who also fronts Music City's experimental Buck Owens tribute Buck N' Stuff. Bybee left in August 2018 and was replaced by Nashville-based drummer Matty Alger, who in turn left in February 2019. Kurtz left the band after the Mile Zero fest in January 2019, and Hussey left in July 2019.

American Aquarium has released seven albums, including their most critically acclaimed album to date, 2012’s Burn. Flicker. Die.. According to American Songwriter, 'It’s a record for anyone who creates art, even if recognition and a stable living may never come of it".

Their first album, Antique Hearts, was released in 2006, followed by The Bible and the Bottle in 2008. The band continued to tour extensively, playing around 250 shows a year. They began building a wider and more varied fan base beyond their native state.

That same year the band released the minimalist live EP Bones, recorded in a friend’s living room. Barham wrote the songs in the wake of a break-up, helping to cement a familiar theme of women who either got away or did the protagonist wrong. Their next album was Dances for the Lonely. Released by Last Chance Records in 2009, it featured one of their fan favorites, “I Hope He Breaks Your Heart.” Small Town Hymns, released in 2010, brought more favorable reviews and continued comparisons to Bruce Springsteen, Whiskeytown, and Lucero.

In 2012, American Aquarium released two albums: Live in Raleigh and Burn. Flicker. Die., which garnered considerable praise from music critics and fans. Produced by Jason Isbell, formerly of Drive By Truckers, the album was originally intended to be the band’s last, but they now have no plans for retirement. Barham says,"It's kind of ironic that the record about not making it is the record that helped us make it." "Throughout, the music crackles and snarls with a raw viscerality that carries distinct echoes of the Drive-By Truckers and early-seventies Rolling Stones—boozy, swaggering closing track “Saturday Nights” even sports a signature crunch-riff that’d put a big smile on Keith Richards’ face." Burn. Flicker. Die. was nominated for "Best Americana/Roots Album” and “Best Album Artwork” in the 2013 Lone Star Music Awards.

The band released their sixth original album, Wolves, in February 2015. The band's fans helped raise $24,000 through a Kickstarter project to help fund the album's production, and the album was recorded in Asheville, North Carolina at Echo Mountain.

On November 25, 2016, Live at Terminal West was released by the band from a live show recording in November 2015 at Terminal West in Atlanta, Georgia.

On June 1, 2018, American Aquarium released Things Change with producer John Fullbright.

On May 1, 2020, American Aquarium released Lamentations with producer Shooter Jennings. Barham wrote the lyrics by comparing Jeremiah's book of Lamentations to modern day America.

Chicamacomico was released on June 10, 2022, through Thirty Tigers. The band's ninth studio album was produced by Brad Cook and recorded at Sonic Ranch, featuring ten songs addressing themes of grief and loss, drawing in part from frontman BJ Barham's personal experiences including the deaths of his mother and grandmother. The album was crowdfunded by fans in under 48 hours and included co-writes with Grammy-winner Lori McKenna and Hayes Carll.

On June 17, 2022, American Aquarium made their debut at the Ryman Auditorium.

The Fear of Standing Still was released on July 26, 2024, through Losing Side Records and Thirty Tigers. The band's tenth studio album was recorded live at Sunset Sound in Los Angeles and produced by Shooter Jennings, marking the pair's second collaboration following 2020's Lamentations. In contrast to the more subdued Chicamacomico, the album delivered a harder-edged rock sound, with Barham's songwriting addressing themes of Southern identity, generational trauma, and reproductive rights.

== Band members ==
=== Line up change ===
On April 2, 2017, Barham announced a lineup change via Facebook, saying "I started American Aquarium in my college dorm room back in 2005 with the hopes of building a band to bring my songs to life,” Barham says. “Over the last 12 years I’ve played 3000+ shows with 26 different members of American Aquarium. We’ve been to 13 countries, 46 states and have recorded 9 albums under the American Aquarium name. It is with a heavy heart that I’m here to say the current lineup of American Aquarium is no more."

=== Current line up ===
BJ Barham in Jacksonville, FL 2021

As of April 2020

- BJ Barham – lead vocals, acoustic guitar (2005–present)
- Shane Boeker – electric guitar, backing vocals (2017–present)
- Neil Jones – pedal steel guitar (2019–present)
- Hank Long – keyboard (2025–present)
- Ryan Van Fleet – drums, percussion (2019–present)
- Alden Hedges – bass guitar, backing vocals (2019–present)

== Discography ==
- Antique Hearts (2006)
- The Bible and the Bottle (2008)
- Bones (2008)
- Dances for the Lonely (Last Chance Records, 2009)
- Small Town Hymns (Last Chance Records, 2010)
- Live in Raleigh (Last Chance Records, 2012)
- Burn. Flicker. Die. (Last Chance Records, 2012)
- Wolves (Independent, 2015)
- Live at Terminal West (Independent, 2016)
- Things Change (New West Records, 2018)
- Lamentations (New West Records, 2020) (No. 16 - US Top Country Albums; No. 133 - US Billboard 200)
- Slappers, Bangers & Certified Twangers, Vol. 1 (2021)
- “The Daytrotter Sessions” (2021)
- Slappers, Bangers & Certified Twangers, Vol. 2 (2021)
- Chicamacomico (2022)
- The Fear of Standing Still (2024)
- Live at Red Rocks (2025)
- New Ways to Lose (2026)
