= The Past Is Still Alive =

Studio album by Hurray for the Riff Raff
- Released: February 23, 2024
- Recorded: 2023
- Length: 36:39
- Label: Nonesuch
- Producer: Brad Cook

Hurray for the Riff Raff chronology
| Life on Earth (2022) | The Past Is Still Alive (2024) |

Singles from The Past Is Still Alive
- 1. "Alibi" Released: November 9, 2023

The Past Is Still Alive is the eighth studio album by Hurray for the Riff Raff. It was released on February 23, 2024, through Nonesuch Records. Produced by Brad Cook, the album features contributions from Conor Oberst, Meg Duffy, Anjimile and S.G. Goodman.

== Background ==
Front member Alynda Segarra started recording The Past Is Still Alive the month after the death of their father, in March 2023. The album emerged from a period of "personal grief" and pulled inspiration from "radical poetry, railroad culture, outsider art", as well as works from Eileen Myles and activist groups like ACT UP and Gran Fury. It sees Segarra dealing with the passing of time and the "ones left behind". Tracks are viewed from the perspective of Segarra as "first-person lyrics" and reflects on key moments of their childhood, struggles in early adulthood and lessons learnt in the present time. Upon announcing The Past Is Still Alive on November 9, 2023, Segarra also shared the lead single "Alibi". They described the song as "a reckoning with time and memory" in an attempt to reach someone that is "destined to be lost".

Hurray for the Riff Raff promoted the album through a 39-date North America and Europe tour in early 2024.

== Critical reception ==
=== Year-end lists ===
Select year-end rankings for The Past Is Still Alive
| Publication/critic | Accolade | Rank | Ref. |
|---|---|---|---|
| Uncut | 80 Best Albums of 2024 | 20 | |

== Track listing ==
All tracks are written by Alynda Segarra.

The Past Is Still Alive track listing
| No. | Title | Length |
|---|---|---|
| 1. | "Alibi" | 2:48 |
| 2. | "Buffalo" | 3:42 |
| 3. | "Hawkmoon" | 3:42 |
| 4. | "Colossus of Roads" | 2:45 |
| 5. | "Snake Plant (The Past Is Still Alive)" | 4:07 |
| 6. | "Vetiver" | 3:52 |
| 7. | "Hourglass" | 2:50 |
| 8. | "Dynamo" | 3:07 |
| 9. | "The World Is Dangerous" | 3:45 |
| 10. | "Ogallala" | 4:59 |
| 11. | "Kiko Forever" | 1:02 |
| Total length: | | 36:39 |

== Personnel ==
Musicians

- Alynda Segarra – vocals (all tracks); acoustic guitar, shaker (tracks 1–10); programming (11)
- Brad Cook – bass guitar (tracks 1–9), acoustic guitar (2), Wurlitzer (3), synthesizer (4), vibraphone (8)
- Phil Cook – organ (tracks 1–10), piano (1, 2, 4, 7–10), electric guitar (1, 8, 9), Dobro (2, 4), Wurlitzer (5, 6), marimba (5)
- Matt Douglas – baritone saxophone, tenor saxophone (tracks 5, 9)
- Meg Duffy – electric guitar (tracks 3, 5, 6, 8); background vocals, synthesizer (5); slide guitar (6)
- S.G. Goodman – background vocals (track 8)
- Mike Mogis – pedal steel guitar (tracks 2, 10); synth bass, synthesizer (10)
- Conor Oberst – background vocals (track 9)
- Libby Rodenbough – fiddle (track 7)
- Anjimile Segarra – background vocals (track 10)
- Jose Segarra – keyboards, vocals (track 11)
- Yan Westerlund – drums (tracks 1–10), tambourine (1, 4–10)

Technical

- Brad Cook – production, engineering
- Heba Kadry – mastering
- Mike Mogis – mixing
- Paul Voran – engineering

== Charts ==
Chart performance for The Past Is Still Alive
| Chart (2024) | Peak position |
|---|---|
| Australian Digital Albums (ARIA) | 23 |
| Croatian International Albums (HDU) | 29 |
| Scottish Albums (OCC) | 25 |
| UK Album Downloads (OCC) | 21 |
