= Small Town Heroes =

Studio album by Hurray for the Riff Raff
- Released: February 11, 2014
- Genres: Americana; folk; roots rock
- Length: 44:03
- Label: ATO
- Producer: Alynda Lee Segarra

Hurray for the Riff Raff chronology
My Dearest Darkest Neighbor (2013)	Small Town Heroes (2014)	The Navigator (2017)

Small Town Heroes is the fifth full length studio album by Hurray for the Riff Raff, and their first to be released by ATO Records. The album was released on February 11, 2014, and produced by the band's frontperson Alynda Lee Segarra. This album is considered the band's breakthrough after receiving a warm critical reception and strong commercial sales.

== Reception ==
=== Commercial performance ===
For the Billboard charting week of March 1, 2014, Small Town Heroes was the No. 158 most sold album in the entirety of the United States via The Billboard 200 and it was the No. 3 album sold in the breaking-and-entry category by the Heatseekers Albums. In addition, the album was the No. 29 most sold Independent Albums, and it was the No. 24 most sold Top Tastemaker Albums. It also sold enough copies to attain No. 41 on the Top Rock Albums chart.

=== Critical reception ===
Professional ratings
Aggregate scores
Source	Rating
AnyDecentMusic?	7.9/10
Metacritic	80/100
Review scores
Source	Rating
AllMusic	3.5/5 stars
The Guardian	3/5 stars
The Irish Times	5/5 stars
Mojo	3/5 stars
The Observer	5/5 stars
Paste	8.0/10
Pitchfork	7.8/10
Q	4/5 stars
Rolling Stone	3.5/5 stars
Uncut	9/10

Small Town Heroes mostly received a positive reception from music critics upon release. At Metacritic, the album holds a score of an 80 out of 100 based upon 15 selected independent ratings and reviews, indicating 'generally favorable reviews'.

At AllMusic, James Christopher Monger rated the album three-and-a-half stars out of five, writing that "Throughout it all Segarra struts her stuff without the slightest bit of arrogance (most of the arrangements are spare, but never willfully so), offering up a confident, yet ultimately amiable set of millennial-informed, urban crafted, Woody Guthrie-inspired, contemporary hobo-folk anthems that play fast and loose with genre tropes without losing the essence that makes them universal." Will Hermes of Rolling Stone rated the album three-and-a-half stars out of five, stating that "Segarra's supple, intimate vocals are about more than conjuring a musical past [...] she clearly wants to shape the future, too."

At Paste, Eric R. Danton rated the album an eight out of ten, saying that the songs "encompass a broad swath of a timeless America, like old Carter Family tunes existing in the peaks and troughs of AM radio waves rolling endlessly over the miles." PopMatters' Eric Risch rated the album an eight out of ten, affirming that the album "is a collection of songs that speak from and for the heart of America’s fringe, calling them both to task and arms" on which Segarra "has found a home and sense of being for her voice – a voice capable and deserving of a population larger than the album’s title."

In his review for Pitchfork, Stephen M. Deusner rated the album a seven-point-eight out of ten, asserting that "With Small Town Heroes, Segarra proves herself one of the most compelling stylists in a folk revival full of suspicious acts either too beholden to tradition or too uncritical to make much of it."

== Track listing ==
All tracks are written by Alynda Lee Segarra, unless otherwise noted.

Small Town Heroes track listing
No.	Title	Writer(s)	Length
1.	"Blue Ridge Mountain"		2:33
2.	"Crash on the Highway"		2:45
3.	"Good Time Blues (An Outlaw's Lament)"		5:17
4.	"End of the Line"		3:38
5.	"The New SF Bay Blues"	Alynda Lee Segarra; Jesse Fuller	4:01
6.	"The Body Electric"		2:49
7.	"No One Else"		3:17
8.	"St. Roch Blues"	Alynda Lee Segarra; Sam Doores	5:09
9.	"Levon's Dream"		3:50
10.	"I Know It's Wrong (But That's Alright)"		2:58
11.	"Small Town Heroes"		4:28
12.	"Forever Is Just a Day"		3:18
Total length:			44:03

== Charts ==
Chart performance for Small Town Heroes
Chart (2014)	Peak position
US Billboard 200	158
US Heatseekers Albums (Billboard)	3
US Independent Albums (Billboard)	29
US Top Rock Albums (Billboard)	41
US Indie Store Album Sales (Billboard)	24
