= Glossary (band) =

- Origin: United States
- Genres: Rock
- Years active: 1997-Present

Glossary is an American rock band from Murfreesboro, Tennessee that formed in 1997.

== History ==
Glossary released their debut LP Southern by the Grace of Location on Champ Records in 1998, followed by All We've Learned About Living in 2000. They released a pair of albums on Undertow Music, How We Handle Our Midnights (2003) and For What I Don't Become (2006), followed by Feral Fire in 2010 on Liberty & Lament records, and finally Long Live All of Us in 2011 via Last Chance Records and Xtra Mile Recordings. The band appeared on an episode of Last Call With Carson Daly in 2013, performing Lonely is a Town.

In 2013 the band was forced to cancel tour dates and go on hiatus after drummer Eric Giles injured his shoulder. The band reunited for a series of 20th anniversary shows in late 2017.

In addition to Glossary, vocalist Joey Kneiser has released two solo albums, each with backing vocals from Glossary bandmate Kelly Smith.

== Discography ==
=== Glossary ===
- 2020 A Very Glossary Christmas EP (Young Buffalo)
- 2011 Long Live All of Us (Xtra Mile Recordings/Last Chance Records)
- 2010 Feral Fire (Liberty & Lament/Undertow)
- 2007 The Better Angels of Our Nature (Last Chance Records/Undertow)
- 2006 For What I Don't Become (Undertow)
- 2003 How We Handle Our Midnights (Undertow)
- 2000 This Is All We've Learned About Living (Champ Records)
- 1998 Southern by the Grace of Location (Champ Records)

=== Joey Kneiser solo ===
- 2015 The Wildness (This Is American Music)
- 2012 Moonlight for the Graveyard Heart EP (self-released)
- 2010 The All Night Bedroom Revival (Undertow)
