= Arthur E. Eilers =

- Born: July 18, 1888; Missouri, U.S.
- Died: March 1, 1958 (aged 69); St. Louis, Missouri, U.S.
- Occupation: Missouri Valley Conference commissioner

Arthur Edwin Eilers (July 18, 1888 – March 1, 1958) was the commissioner (1946–1957) and executive secretary (1919–1946) of the Missouri Valley Conference and coach at Washington University in St. Louis. At Washington University he served as the tennis and swimming coach. He served for 10 years on the NCAA swimming rules committee. He coached Washington University to five consecutive MVIAA swimming titles. Eilers retired as commissioner of the Missouri Valley Conference on July 1, 1957. He died while officiating a swimming meet being held at Washington University's Wilson Pool.
