= Missouri Valley Conference =

US college athletic conference

- Association: NCAA
- Founded: 1907; 119 years ago
- Commissioner: Jeff Jackson (since 2021)
- Sports fielded: 18; men's: 8; women's: 10
- Division: Division I
- Subdivision: non-football
- No. of teams: 11
- Headquarters: St. Louis, Missouri
- Region: Midwestern & Southern United States
- Broadcasters: ESPN CBS/CBSSN Gray Media
- Website: mvc-sports.com

Locations

The Missouri Valley Conference (also called MVC or simply "The Valley") is the fourth-oldest collegiate athletic conference in the United States. The conference's members are primarily located in the Midwest though with substantial extension into the South in states like Kentucky, Tennessee, and Arkansas, along with one affiliate university in Massachusetts.

== History ==
The MVC was established in 1907 (its charter member schools: the University of Kansas, University of Missouri, University of Nebraska, and Washington University in St. Louis) as the Missouri Valley Intercollegiate Athletic Association (MVIAA), 12 years after the Big Ten Conference, the only Division I conference that is older. It is the fourth-oldest college athletic conference in the United States, after the Big Ten Conference and the NCAA Division III's Michigan Intercollegiate Athletic Association (MIAA) and Ohio Athletic Conference (OAC).

The MVIAA split in 1928, with most of the larger schools (the University of Kansas, University of Missouri, University of Nebraska, Iowa Agricultural College (now Iowa State University), Kansas State University, and University of Oklahoma) forming a conference that retained the MVIAA name; this conference evolved into the Big Eight Conference. The Big Eight merged with four Texas schools of the Southwest Conference to form the Big 12 Conference in 1996.

The smaller MVIAA schools (Drake, Grinnell and Washington University in St. Louis), plus Oklahoma A&M (now Oklahoma State University, which joined the Big Eight in 1957), were joined by Creighton to form the MVC, which retained the old MVIAA's administrative staff.

To this day, it has never been definitively established which conference was the original and which was the spinoff, though the Big Eight would go on to become the more prestigious of the two. During the Big Eight's run, both conferences claimed 1907 as their founding date, and the same history through 1927.

MVC teams held a 74–27 non-conference record during the 2006–07 college basketball season, including a record of 44–1 at home. The Valley finished in the top six of the RPI and ahead of a BCS conference for the second consecutive year, while also garnering multiple NCAA bids for the ninth straight year and 12th of 14.

The MVC has not sponsored football since 1985, when it was a hybrid I-A/I-AA (now FBS and FCS, respectively) conference. However, five members have football programs in the Missouri Valley Football Conference (MVFC) (known as the Gateway from 1985 to 2008) of Division I FCS, and two others compete in another FCS conference, the Pioneer Football League. The Missouri Valley Conference shares its name with the MVFC, and all three conferences operate from the same headquarters complex in St. Louis; however, the three are separate administratively.

After weeks of speculation, Wichita State announced on April 7, 2017, that it would leave the conference to join the American Athletic Conference starting with the 2017–18 season. The conference announced it extended an invitation to Valparaiso University on May 9, 2017; and on May 25, the MVC announced that Valparaiso would officially join the following July 1.

The most recent changes to the core MVC membership were announced during the 2021–22 school year. On September 28, 2021, the MVC and Belmont University jointly announced that the school would leave the Ohio Valley Conference for the MVC effective July 1, 2022. Then, on November 16, Loyola University Chicago announced it would leave the MVC at the same time, joining the Atlantic 10 Conference. On the same day Loyola announced its departure, CBS Sports reported that the MVC was actively pursuing further expansion, having entered into talks with the University of Missouri–Kansas City (known athletically as Kansas City), Murray State University, and the University of Texas at Arlington (UT Arlington). The report indicated that the latter two were considered the strongest candidates, but that all three were likely to receive invitations in the coming months. On January 7, 2022, the MVC announced that Murray State would officially join the conference on July 1 of that year. UT Arlington would soon remove itself from the list of candidates by announcing a 2022 move to the Western Athletic Conference.

Shortly before Murray State was officially announced as an incoming MVC member, Matt Brown of the Extra Points college sports blog reported that the MVC was also in membership discussions with the University of Illinois Chicago (UIC), then a member of the Horizon League. On the same weekend that Murray State's arrival was officially announced, MVC officials made a site visit to UIC. Brown's sources indicated that an invitation to UIC was likely. Brown noted that with the MVC losing Loyola, league officials believed that maintaining a presence in the city was a top priority, stating (emphasis in original):

Throughout this process, multiple administrators at MVC institutions stressed the importance of getting access to new urban areas to recruit more students, not just athletes. With so many schools depending heavily on Chicago, and especially Chicago's suburbs, for enrollment, continuing to have a presence in the city was seen as a major priority.

On January 22, 2022, Matt Norlander of CBSSports.com reported that UIC's July entry to the MVC was "a done deal", with his sources indicating that the MVC wanted to announce the move before the Conference Commissioners Association held its annual meeting in Naples, Florida in early February. UIC's entry was officially announced on January 26.

On May 10, 2024, Missouri State announced it would leave the MVC to transition to the Football Bowl Subdivision (FBS) and join Conference USA, effective for the 2025–26 season.

The MVC's decades-long ties with the MVFC were formalized when the latter announced a new conference structure on May 5, 2025, taking effect that July. Under the new structure, the MVFC's top two administrative positions will be filled by the commissioners of the MVC and the also non-football Summit League, and both multisport conferences will share administrative operations. The MVC and Summit are the full-time conference homes of all but one of the MVFC's 10 members in the 2025 season.

== Member schools ==
Missouri Valley Conference
Location of MVC members:
full member affiliate member
Not shown: current affiliate UMass

=== Current full members ===
Institution	Location	Founded	Type	Enrollment	Endowment (millions)	Nickname	Joined (Note: Represents the calendar year when fall sports competition begins.)	Colors
Belmont University	Nashville, Tennessee	1890	Nondenominational	8,700	$356.8	Bruins	2022 (Note: Belmont previously competed in the MVC as an affiliate member for men's and women's soccer only during the 2000 fall season (2000–01 school year).)	
Bradley University	Peoria, Illinois	1897	Nonsectarian	5,451	$350.0	Braves	1948	
Bradley University	Peoria, Illinois	1897	Nonsectarian	5,451	$350.0	Braves	1955 (Note: Bradley and Drake both withdrew from the MVC during the 1951–52 school year in protest over the Johnny Bright incident, a racially motivated on-field attack by an Oklahoma A&M football player against Drake player Johnny Bright in a 1951 game. Bradley returned to the MVC for non-football sports in the 1955–56 school year, with Drake doing the same a year later (1956–57 school year). However, Bradley never returned to MVC football, dropping the sport after the 1970 fall season (1970–71 school year), and Drake did not return for football until the 1971 fall season (1971–72 school year).)	
Drake University	Des Moines, Iowa	1881	Nonsectarian	5,270	$219.8	Bulldogs	1907	
Drake University	Des Moines, Iowa	1881	Nonsectarian	5,270	$219.8	Bulldogs	1956	
University of Evansville	Evansville, Indiana	1854	United Methodist	2,526	$157.0	Purple Aces	1994	
University of Illinois Chicago	Chicago, Illinois	1946	Public	30,539	$527.9	Flames	2022	
Illinois State University	Normal, Illinois	1857	Public	20,683	$270	Redbirds	1980 (Note: The Illinois State men's basketball team joined the MVC a year after becoming a full member for other sports (1981–82).)	
Indiana State University	Terre Haute, Indiana	1865	Public	13,584	$102.9	Sycamores	1976 (Note: The Indiana State men's basketball team joined the MVC a year after becoming a full member for other sports (1977–78).)	
Murray State University	Murray, Kentucky	1922	Public	10,495	$100.2	Racers	2022	
University of Northern Iowa	Cedar Falls, Iowa	1876	Public	12,273	$163.0	Panthers	1991	
Southern Illinois University	Carbondale, Illinois	1869	Public	11,695	$171.8	Salukis	1974 (Note: The Southern Illinois men's basketball team joined the MVC a year after becoming a full member for other sports (1975–76).)	
Valparaiso University	Valparaiso, Indiana	1859	Lutheran	2,900	$254.2	Beacons (Note: Valparaiso officially adopted the "Beacons" nickname shortly before the start of classes in the 2021–22 school year after abandoning its previous nickname of Crusaders due to unfavorable connotations.)	2017 (Note: Valparaiso previously competed in the MVC as an affiliate member for women's soccer from the 1996 to the 1998 fall seasons (1996–97 to 1998–99 school years).)	

=== Affiliate members ===
Note: In the case of spring sports, the year of joining is the calendar year before the start of competition.

Institution	Location	Founded	Type	Enrollment	Nickname	Joined (Note: Represents the calendar year when fall sports competition begins.)	MVC sport(s)	Primary conference
Ball State University	Muncie, Indiana	1918	Public	21,597	Cardinals	2024	Men's swimming & diving	Mid-American (MAC)
Bowling Green State University (Bowling Green)	Bowling Green, Ohio	1910	Public	18,142	Falcons	2023 (Note: Bowling Green, Northern Illinois, and Western Michigan's full-time home of the Mid-American Conference suspended men's soccer as a conference sport after the conclusion of the 2022 season.)	Men's soccer	Mid-American (MAC)
University of Massachusetts Amherst (UMass)	Amherst, Massachusetts	1863	Public	27,420	Minutemen	2025	Men's swimming & diving	Mid-American (MAC)
Miami University	Oxford, Ohio	1809	Public	18,880	RedHawks	2024	Men's swimming & diving	Mid-American (MAC)
Missouri State University (Note: Missouri State was a full member of the MVC from 1990–91 to 2024–25.)	Springfield, Missouri	1905	Public	26,000	Bears & Lady Bears	2025 (Note: Measured from Missouri State's departure from full MVC membership.)	Men's swimming & diving	Conf. USA (CUSA)
Missouri State University	Springfield, Missouri	1905	Public	26,000	Bears & Lady Bears	2025	Women's swimming & diving	Conf. USA (CUSA)
Western Michigan University	Kalamazoo, Michigan	1903	Public	19,887	Broncos	2023	Men's soccer	Mid-American (MAC)

=== Former members ===
==== Former full members ====
Institution	Location	Founded	Type	Nickname	Joined (Note: Represents the calendar year when fall sports competition begins.)	Left (Note: Represents the calendar year when spring sports competition ends.)	Current conference
Butler University	Indianapolis, Indiana	1855	Nonsectarian	Bulldogs	1932	1934	Big East
University of Cincinnati	Cincinnati, Ohio	1819	Public	Bearcats	1957	1970	Big 12
Creighton University	Omaha, Nebraska	1878	Catholic (Jesuit)	Bluejays	1928	1948	Big East
Creighton University	Omaha, Nebraska	1878	Catholic (Jesuit)	Bluejays	1976 (Note: Creighton previously withdrew from the MVC from 1948–49 to 1975–76.) (Note: The Creighton men's basketball team joined the MVC a year after becoming a full member for other sports (1977–78).)	2013	Big East
University of Detroit (Note: Currently known as the University of Detroit Mercy.)	Detroit, Michigan	1877	Catholic (Jesuit)	Titans	1949	1956	Horizon
Grinnell College	Grinnell, Iowa	1846	Nonsectarian (Note: Historically related to the United Church of Christ.)	Pioneers	1918	1939	Midwest (MWC) (Note: Currently an NCAA Division III athletic conference.)
University of Houston	Houston, Texas	1927	Public	Cougars	1950 (Note: The Houston football team joined the MVC a year after becoming a full member for other sports (1951–52).)	1960	Big 12
University of Iowa	Iowa City, Iowa	1847	Public	Hawkeyes	1907	1908	Big Ten (B1G)
Iowa State College (Note: Currently known as Iowa State University.)	Ames, Iowa	1858	Public	Cyclones	1907	1928	Big 12
University of Kansas	Lawrence, Kansas	1865	Public	Jayhawks	1907	1928	Big 12
Kansas State College (Note: Currently known as Kansas State University.)	Manhattan, Kansas	1863	Public	Wildcats	1913	1928	Big 12
University of Louisville	Louisville, Kentucky	1798	Public	Cardinals	1963 (Note: The Louisville men's basketball team joined the MVC a year after becoming a full member for other sports (1964–65).)	1975	Atlantic Coast (ACC)
Loyola University Chicago	Chicago, Illinois	1870	Catholic (Jesuit)	Ramblers	2013	2022	Atlantic 10 (A10)
Memphis State University (Note: Currently known as the University of Memphis.)	Memphis, Tennessee	1912	Public	Tigers	1968	1973	The American
University of Missouri	Columbia, Missouri	1839	Public	Tigers	1907	1928	Southeastern (SEC)
Missouri State University (Note: Formerly known as Southwest Missouri State University until 2005.) (Note: Missouri State remains in the MVC as an affiliate member for men's and women's swimming & diving.)	Springfield, Missouri	1905	Public	Bears & Lady Bears (Note: In beach volleyball, a sport not sponsored by the MVC, Missouri State uses Beach Bears instead of Lady Bears.)	1990	2025	Conf. USA (CUSA)
University of Nebraska	Lincoln, Nebraska	1869	Public	Cornhuskers	1907	1919	Big Ten (B1G)
University of Nebraska	Lincoln, Nebraska	1869	Public	Cornhuskers	1921	1928	Big Ten (B1G)
New Mexico State University	Las Cruces, New Mexico	1888	Public	Aggies	1970 (Note: The New Mexico State football team joined the MVC a year after becoming a full member for other sports (1971–72); while its men's basketball team joined the MVC two years after (1972–73).)	1983	Conf. USA (CUSA)
North Texas State University (Note: Currently known as the University of North Texas.)	Denton, Texas	1890	Public	Mean Green	1957	1975	The American
University of Oklahoma	Norman, Oklahoma	1890	Public	Sooners	1919	1928	Southeastern (SEC)
Oklahoma A&M College (Note: Currently known as Oklahoma State University.)	Stillwater, Oklahoma	1890	Public	Aggies & Cowboys (Note: During Oklahoma A&M's tenure in the MVC, the nicknames "Aggies" and "Cowboys" were used interchangeably. When the school adopted its current name in 1957, the "Cowboys" nickname was exclusively adopted.)	1925	1956	Big 12
Saint Louis University	St. Louis, Missouri	1818	Catholic (Jesuit)	Billikens	1937	1974	Atlantic 10 (A10)
University of Tulsa (Note: Tulsa would later rejoin the MVC as a men's soccer associate from the 2000 to 2004 fall seasons (2000–01 to 2004–05 school years).)	Tulsa, Oklahoma	1894	Nonsectarian (Note: Historically affiliated with the Presbyterian Church (PCUSA).)	Golden Hurricane	1935	1996	The American
Washburn University	Topeka, Kansas	1865	Public	Ichabods	1935	1942	Mid-America (MIAA) (Note: Currently an NCAA Division II athletic conference.)
Washington University in St. Louis	St. Louis, Missouri	1853	Nonsectarian	Bears	1907	1942	University (UAA)
West Texas State University (Note: Currently known as West Texas A&M University.)	Canyon, Texas	1910	Public	Buffaloes	1970 (Note: The West Texas A&M men's basketball team joined the MVC two years after becoming a full member for other sports (1972–73).)	1986	Lone Star (LSC)
Wichita State University	Wichita, Kansas	1895	Public	Shockers	1949	2017	The American

==== Former affiliate members ====
This list does not include current full members Belmont and Valparaiso. As noted above, the Bruins played men's and women's soccer in the MVC for the 2000 fall season (2000–01 school year); and the Beacons, then known as the Crusaders, played women's soccer in the MVC from the 1996 to 1998 fall seasons (1996–97 to 1998–99 school years).

Institution	Location	Founded	Type	Nickname	Joined (Note: Represents the calendar year when fall sports competition begins.)	Left (Note: Represents the calendar year when spring sports competition ends.)	MVC sport(s)	Primary conference
University of Arkansas at Little Rock (Little Rock (Note: Formerly branded athletically as Arkansas–Little Rock (or UALR).))	Little Rock, Arkansas	1927	Public	Trojans	1998	2000	Women's soccer	United (UAC)
University of Arkansas at Little Rock (Little Rock)	Little Rock, Arkansas	1927	Public	Trojans	2013	2026	Women's swimming & diving	United (UAC)
University of Central Arkansas	Conway, Arkansas	1907	Public	Bears	2010	2019	Men's soccer (Note: Central Arkansas is currently an Atlantic Sun Conference men's soccer affiliate.)	United (UAC)
Dallas Baptist University (DBU)	Dallas, Texas	1898	Baptist	Patriots	2013	2022	Baseball (Note: Dallas Baptist currently competes in the Pac-12 Conference as an affiliate member for baseball.)	Lone Star (LSC) (Note: Currently an NCAA Division II athletic conference.)
Drury University	Springfield, Missouri	1873	UCC & DOC	Panthers	1999	2005	Women's soccer	Great Lakes Valley (GLVC)
Eastern Illinois University (EIU)	Charleston, Illinois	1895	Public	Panthers	1996	2011	Men's soccer	Ohio Valley (OVC)
Eastern Illinois University (EIU)	Charleston, Illinois	1895	Public	Panthers	1996	1999	Women's soccer	Ohio Valley (OVC)
University of Hartford	Hartford, Connecticut	1877	Nonsectarian	Hawks	2014	2016	Men's tennis (Note: Hartford dropped men's tennis after the 2015–16 school year.)	C. New England (CNE) (Note: Currently an NCAA Division III athletic conference.)
Marshall University	Huntington, West Virginia	1837	Public	Thundering; Herd	2022 (Note: Marshall joined the MVC as an affiliate member for women's swimming & diving, but only during the 2022–23 school year. Marshall's primary conference home (the Sun Belt Conference) has added women's swimming & diving since 2023–24.)	2023	Women's swimming	Sun Belt (SBC)
University of Maryland, Baltimore County (UMBC)	Catonsville, Maryland (Note: The campus has a Baltimore mailing address.)	1966	Public	Retrievers	2014	2016	Men's tennis (Note: UMBC dropped men's tennis after the 2015–16 school year.)	America East (AmEast)
Northern Illinois University	DeKalb, Illinois	1895	Public	Huskies	2023	2026	Men's soccer	Horizon
Southern Illinois University Edwardsville (SIUE)	Edwardsville, Illinois	1957	Public	Cougars	2010	2017	Men's soccer	Ohio Valley (OVC)
Southern Illinois University Edwardsville (SIUE)	Edwardsville, Illinois	1957	Public	Cougars	2021	2023	Men's soccer	Ohio Valley (OVC)
Southern Methodist University (SMU)	University Park, Texas (Note: The campus has a Dallas mailing address.)	1911	Nonsectartian (Note: Historically affiliated with the United Methodist Church.)	Mustangs	2000	2005	Men's soccer	Atlantic Coast (ACC)
Stony Brook University (Note: Also known as the State University of New York at Stony Brook.)	Stony Brook, New York	1957	Public	Seawolves	2014	2017	Men's tennis (Note: Stony Brook dropped men's tennis after the 2016–17 school year. The school's women's tennis team remained an MVC affiliate, but left when it joined the CAA in July 2022.)	Coastal (CAA)
Stony Brook University	Stony Brook, New York	1957	Public	Seawolves	2014	2022	Women's tennis	Coastal (CAA)
Texas Christian University (TCU)	Fort Worth, Texas	1873	Disciples of Christ	Horned Frogs	2000	2001	Men's soccer (Note: TCU dropped men's soccer after the 2002 fall season (2002–03 school year).)	Big 12
University of Tulsa (Note: Tulsa was a full member from 1935–36 to 1995–96, but rejoined the MVC as a men's soccer associate from the 2000 to 2004 fall seasons (2000–01 to 2004–05 school years).)	Tulsa, Oklahoma	1894	Nondenominational (Note: Historically affiliated with the Presbyterian Church (PCUSA).)	Golden; Hurricane	2000	2005	Men's soccer	American
Vanderbilt University	Nashville, Tennessee	1873	Nonsectarian	Commodores	1997	2006	Men's soccer (Note: Vanderbilt dropped men's soccer after the 2005 fall season (2005–06 school year).)	Southeastern (SEC)
Western Kentucky University (WKU)	Bowling Green, Kentucky	1906	Public	Hilltoppers	1997	2008	Men's soccer (Note: Western Kentucky dropped men's soccer after the 2007 fall season (2007–08 school year).)	Conf. USA (CUSA)

=== Membership timeline ===
Full member (all sports) Full member (non-football) Associate member (football) Associate member (sport) Other Conference Other Conference

== Commissioners ==
1. C. E. McClung (1907–19??)
2. Arthur (Artie) E. Eilers (1925–1957)
3. Norvall Neve (1957–1969)
4. DeWitt Weaver (1969–1972)
5. Mickey Holmes (1972–1979)
6. David Price (1979–1981)
7. Richard D. Martin (1981–1985)
8. James A. Haney (1985–1988)
9. Doug Elgin (1988–2021)
10. Jeff Jackson (2021–present)

== Sports ==
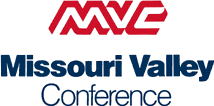
Former Missouri Valley Conference logo

The Missouri Valley Conference sponsors championship competition in eight men's and ten women's NCAA sanctioned sports. Ball State (men) and Miami (OH) (men) are affiliates in swimming and diving, and Bowling Green and Western Michigan are affiliates in men's soccer.

The most recent change to the roster of sports came in the 2024–25 school year, when the MVC reinstated men's swimming & diving after a 22-year absence. The inaugural season of the relaunched league features 7 sponsoring members, with full members Evansville, UIC, Missouri State, Southern Illinois, and Valparaiso joined by new affiliates Ball State and Miami (OH)— previously, all these programs were housed in the Mid-American Conference.

Teams in Missouri Valley Conference competition
Sport	Men's	Women's
Baseball	9	–
Basketball	11	11
Cross country	11	11
Golf	9	11
Soccer	8	10
Softball	–	11
Swimming & diving	8	9
Tennis	–	8
Track and field (indoor)	10	11
Track and field (outdoor)	10	11
Volleyball	–	11

=== Men's sponsored sports by school ===
School	Baseball	Basketball	Cross country	Golf	Soccer	Swimming & diving	Track & field (indoor)	Track & field (outdoor)	Total MVC sports
Belmont	Yes	Yes	Yes	Yes	Yes	No	Yes	Yes	7
Bradley	Yes	Yes	Yes	Yes	Yes	No	Yes	Yes	7
Drake	No	Yes	Yes	Yes	Yes	No	Yes	Yes	6
Evansville	Yes	Yes	Yes	Yes	Yes	Yes	Yes	Yes	8
UIC	Yes	Yes	Yes	No	Yes	Yes	Yes	Yes	7
Illinois State	Yes	Yes	Yes	Yes	No	No	Yes	Yes	6
Indiana State	Yes	Yes	Yes	No	No	No	Yes	Yes	5
Murray State	Yes	Yes	Yes	Yes	No	No	No	No	4
Northern Iowa	No	Yes	Yes	Yes	No	No	Yes	Yes	5
Southern Illinois	Yes	Yes	Yes	Yes	No	Yes	Yes	Yes	7
Valparaiso	Yes	Yes	Yes	Yes	No	Yes (Note: Valparaiso does not include diving in its intercollegiate aquatics program.)	Yes	Yes	7
Totals	9	11	11	9	5+2 (Note: Men's soccer associate members Bowling Green and Western Michigan.)	4+4 (Note: Men's swimming & diving associate members Ball State, UMass, Miami (Ohio), and Missouri State.)	10	10	69+6

Men's varsity sports not sponsored by the Missouri Valley Conference which are played by Valley schools:

School	Football	Rifle (Note: Rifle is a fully coeducational sport, though the NCAA treats it as a men's sport for purposes of its sports sponsorship regulations.)	Tennis	Wrestling
Belmont	No	No	Horizon	No
Drake	Pioneer League	No	MAC	No
UIC	No	No	MAC	No
Illinois State	MVFC	No	No	No
Indiana State	MVFC	No	No	No
Murray State	MVFC	OVC (Note: Murray State fields a single coeducational rifle team.)	No (Note: Murray State will reinstate men's tennis, possibly as early as 2027–28. It has yet to announce a conference affiliation.)	No
Northern Iowa	MVFC	No	No	Big 12
Southern Illinois	MVFC	No	No	No
Valparaiso	Pioneer League	No	No	No

=== Women's sponsored sports by school ===
School	Basketball	Cross country	Golf	Soccer	Softball	Swimming	Tennis	Track & field (indoor)	Track & field (outdoor)	Volleyball	Total MVC sports
Belmont	Yes	Yes	Yes	Yes	Yes	No	Yes	Yes	Yes	Yes	9
Bradley	Yes	Yes	Yes	No	Yes	No	Yes	Yes	Yes	Yes	8
Drake	Yes	Yes	Yes	Yes	Yes	No	Yes	Yes	Yes	Yes	9
Evansville	Yes	Yes	Yes	Yes	Yes	Yes	No	Yes	Yes	Yes	9
UIC	Yes	Yes	Yes	Yes	Yes	Yes	Yes	Yes	Yes	Yes	10
Illinois State	Yes	Yes	Yes	Yes	Yes	Yes	Yes	Yes	Yes	Yes	10
Indiana State	Yes	Yes	Yes	Yes	Yes	Yes	No	Yes	Yes	Yes	9
Murray State	Yes	Yes	Yes	Yes	Yes	No	Yes	Yes	Yes	Yes	9
Northern Iowa	Yes	Yes	Yes	Yes	Yes	Yes	Yes	Yes	Yes	Yes	10
Southern Illinois	Yes	Yes	Yes	Yes	Yes	Yes	No	Yes	Yes	Yes	9
Valparaiso	Yes	Yes	Yes	Yes	Yes	Yes (Note: Valparaiso does not include diving in its intercollegiate aquatics program for either men or women.)	Yes	Yes	Yes	Yes	10
Totals	11	11	11	10	11	7+1 (Note: Swimming & diving associate Missouri State)	8	11	11	11	102+1

Women's varsity sports not sponsored by the Missouri Valley Conference which are played by Valley schools:

School	Beach volleyball	Bowling	Gymnastics	Rifle (Note: Rifle is a fully coeducational sport, though the NCAA treats it as a men's sport for purposes of its sports sponsorship regulations.)	Rowing	Stunt
Drake	No	No	No	No	Metro	No
Illinois State	No	No	MIC	No	No	No
Murray State	No (Note: Murray State will add beach volleyball, bowling, and stunt, and also reinstate rowing, as early as 2027–28.)	No	No	OVC (Note: Murray State fields a single coeducational rifle team.)	No	No
Valparaiso	No	CUSA	No	No	No	No

== Facilities ==
School	Soccer Field	Capacity	Basketball Center	Capacity	Softball Complex	Capacity	Baseball Stadium	Capacity
Belmont	E. S. Rose Park	300	Curb Event Center	5,085	E. S. Rose Park	250	E. S. Rose Park	750
Bradley	Shea Stadium	3,800	Men: Carver Arena; Women: Renaissance Coliseum	11,060; 4,200	Louisville Slugger Sports Complex	1,000	Dozer Park	8,500
Drake	Mediacom Stadium	4,000	The Knapp Center	6,424	Ron Buel Field	500	Non-baseball school	
Evansville	Arad McCutchan Stadium	2,500	Men: Ford Center; Women: Meeks Family Fieldhouse	10,000; 1,087	James & Dorothy; Cooper Stadium	650	Charles H. Braun Stadium	1,200
UIC	Flames Field	1,200	Credit Union 1 Arena	8,000	Flames Field	500	Curtis Granderson Stadium	2,000
Illinois State	Adelaide Street Field	1,000	CEFCU Arena	10,200	Marian Kneer Softball Stadium	1,050	Duffy Bass Field	1,000
Indiana State	Memorial Stadium	12,764	Hulman Center	9,000	Eleanor Forsythe St. John Softball Complex	700	Sycamore Stadium	2,000
Murray State	Cutchin Field	250	CFSB Center	8,600	Racer Field	500	Johnny Reagan Field	800
Northern Iowa	UNI Soccer Field	—N/a	McLeod Center	6,500	Robinson-Dresser Sports Complex	—N/a	Non-baseball school	
Southern Illinois	Saluki Stadium	15,000	Banterra Center	8,339	Charlotte West Stadium	502	Itchy Jones Stadium	2,000
Valparaiso	Brown Field	5,000	Athletics–Recreation Center	5,000	Valpo Softball Complex	—N/a	Emory G. Bauer Field	500
Affiliate members
Bowling Green	Mickey Cochrane Stadium	1,500	Men's soccer-only member					
Western Michigan	WMU Soccer Complex	1,000	Men's soccer-only member					

Note

1. For football venues of the member schools who participate in the sport, see Missouri Valley Football Conference | Facilities and Pioneer Football League | Conference facilities.

== Basketball tournament champions by year ==
The Missouri Valley Conference men's basketball tournament is often referred to as Arch Madness, in reference to the Gateway Arch at the tournament's present location of St. Louis, Missouri, and a play on "March Madness". The women's tournament is currently promoted as Hoops in the Heartland.

Season	Men's Champion	Women's Champion
1977	Southern Illinois	No Tournament
1978	Creighton	No Tournament
1979	Indiana State	No Tournament
1980	Bradley	No Tournament
1981	Creighton	No Tournament
1982	Tulsa	No Tournament
1983	Illinois State	Illinois State
1984	Tulsa	No Tournament
1985	Wichita State	No Tournament
1986	Tulsa	No Tournament
1987	Wichita State	Southern Illinois
1988	Bradley	Eastern Illinois
1989	Creighton	Illinois State
1990	Illinois State	Southern Illinois
1991	Creighton	Southwest Missouri State
1992	Southwest Missouri State	Southwest Missouri State
1993	Southern Illinois	Southwest Missouri State
1994	Southern Illinois	Southwest Missouri State
1995	Southern Illinois	Drake
1996	Tulsa	Southwest Missouri State
1997	Illinois State	Illinois State
1998	Illinois State	Illinois State
1999	Creighton	Evansville
2000	Creighton	Drake
2001	Indiana State	Southwest Missouri State
2002	Creighton	Creighton
2003	Creighton	Southwest Missouri State
2004	Northern Iowa	Southwest Missouri State
2005	Creighton	Illinois State
2006	Southern Illinois	Missouri State
2007	Creighton	Drake
2008	Drake	Illinois State
2009	Northern Iowa	Evansville
2010	Northern Iowa	Northern Iowa
2011	Indiana State	Northern Iowa
2012	Creighton	Creighton
2013	Creighton	Wichita State
2014	Wichita State	Wichita State
2015	Northern Iowa	Wichita State
2016	Northern Iowa	Missouri State
2017	Wichita State	Drake
2018	Loyola Chicago	Drake
2019	Bradley	Missouri State
2020	Bradley	Canceled (COVID-19 pandemic)
2021	Loyola Chicago	Bradley
2022	Loyola Chicago	Illinois State
2023	Drake	Drake
2024	Drake	Drake
2025	Drake	Murray State

NB: Missouri State was known as Southwest Missouri State until August 2005.

=== Postseason history multiple bids ===
NCAA tournament
Year	MVC Rep.			
1979	(1) Indiana State	(10) New Mexico State		
1981	(6) Wichita State	(8) Creighton		
1984	(4) Tulsa	(8) Illinois State		
1985	(6) Tulsa	(9) Illinois State	(11) Wichita State	
1986	(7) Bradley	(10) Tulsa		
1987	(11) Tulsa	(11) Wichita State		
1988	(9) Bradley	(12) Wichita State		
1994	(11) Southern Illinois	(12) Tulsa		
1995	(6) Tulsa	(10) Southern Illinois		
1996	(8) Bradley	(11) Tulsa		
1999	(10) Creighton	(11) Evansville	(12) Southwest Missouri State	
2000	(10) Creighton	(12) Indiana State		
2001	(10) Creighton	(13) Indiana State		
2002	(11) Southern Illinois	(12) Creighton		
2003	(6) Creighton	(11) Southern Illinois		
2004	(9) Southern Illinois	(14) Northern Iowa		
2005	(7) Southern Illinois	(10) Creighton	(11) Northern Iowa	
2006	(7) Wichita State	(10) Northern Iowa	(11) Southern Illinois	(13) Bradley
2007	(4) Southern Illinois	(10) Creighton		
2012	(5) Wichita State	(8) Creighton		
2013	(7) Creighton	(9) Wichita State		
2015	(5) Northern Iowa	(7) Wichita State		
2016	(11) Northern Iowa	(11) Wichita State		
2021	(8) Loyola Chicago	(11) Drake		

== National team titles by institution ==
School – Number – NCAA championships

- Belmont
- Bradley – 2
- Drake – 3
- Evansville – 0+5*
- UIC - 0+2*
- Illinois State – 0+1*
- Indiana State – 1
- Missouri State – 0 +2*
- Murray State
- UNI – 1+2*
- Southern Illinois – 5+3*
- Valparaiso – 0

NCAA Championships as of March 2013

(*-Titles won by schools in Division II/College Division prior to their moving to Division I in the late 1960s or early 1970s)

Football poll, Helms and AIAW titles are not included in the NCAA Championship count.

== Men's basketball attendance ==
The Valley is well known for having some of the most dedicated fanbases in all of college basketball, with several members regularly selling out their large arenas on a nightly basis throughout the year. Former member Creighton had the sixth highest attendance for Division I in 2012–13, while Bradley, Illinois State, Missouri State, and Indiana State were all among the NCAA's top 100 teams in home attendance.

In 2010–11, 2011–12, and 2012–13, the Valley maintained its position as the eighth ranked conference in average attendance.

The Valley made history in March 2007, with record attendance for four days at St. Louis' Scottrade Center as 85,074 fans turned out to watch the five sessions of the conference tournament. The two sellout crowds of 22,612 for the semifinals and final of the 2007 tournament set an all-time attendance record for basketball at the arena and also gave the Valley the distinction of having the largest championship crowd for any of the 30 NCAA conference tournaments in 2007.

== Football champions by year ==
- All MVC schools that currently play football are part of the Missouri Valley Football Conference except for Drake and Valparaiso, which play in the Pioneer Football League.

== MVC TV Network ==
Since at least 1993, the MVC has produced an in-house package of sports as part of the MVC TV Network.Starting in 1996, those telecasts were produced, in part, by Bally Sports Midwest (formerly Fox Sports Midwest). These games were distributed to regional sports networks including Bally Sports Indiana, Bally Sports Kansas City, Bally Sports South, Bally Sports Southeast, and NBC Sports Chicago (now Chicago Sports Network), as well as shown on Bally Sports Midwest. Until the 2020–21 season, some of these telecasts also aired on Fox College Sports. Outside of regional networks these telecasts were also available on ESPN3 until the 2018–19 season; those telecasts were then migrated over to ESPN+.

Starting with the 2024–25 academic year, production and distribution rights were acquired by Gray Media, with Gray Media-owned Indianapolis-based Tupelo Honey handling the actual production and distribution. It is a linear over-the-air station package distributed in Gray Media markets within the MVC member states of Illinois, Indiana, Iowa, Kentucky, Missouri, and Tennessee as well as third-party broadcast partners in markets within those same states where Gray Media has no presence; in addition, simulcasts will be available live nationally (via ESPN+ and through the ESPN app) without any digital blackouts (prior contracts prohibited simulcast availability within the MVC footprint).

The MVC TV Network serves as the home for the opening and quarterfinal rounds of Arch Madness (the nickname for the MVC men's basketball tournament).

== See also ==
- Missouri Valley Conference Hall of Fame
