= Mod Mobilian =

- Website type: Music webzine
- Owners: Trey Lane, Doc Valso, Kris Skoda, Emily Hayes
- Website: modmobilian.com
- Registration: No
- Launched: 2009
- Current status: Defunct

Mod Mobilian was a regional website focused on the music, art and culture of metro Mobile, the Eastern Shore, and the surrounding areas of the Southeastern United States. It was started in 2009 by co-editors Trey Lane and Doc Valso. It had over 20 contributing writers including videographer Kris Skoda, disc jockey Emily Hayes, columnist Kevin Lee, playwright Danielle Juzan, and political columnist Jessica James. It was the largest independent arts and culture website on the Central Gulf Coast in terms of social network followers and monthly views. In 2012, it was the official interview crew for Deluna Fest in Pensacola, Florida. In 2012, it was selected as "Best Local Website" by the newspaper Lagniappe. It is a contributing site to the multi-state Southern music aggregator website, SouthSounds Review.

== Mod Mobilian Press ==
The Mod Mobilian Press started in 2011 and has released four books by local authors.

- Kevin B. Lee - Colonnades
- Janet Nodar - Trumpet Field and Other Stories
- Tributaries 2012 Mobile Bay literary anthology
- Kenneth A. Robinson - Port City Crusader: John LeFlore and the Non-Partisan Voters’ League in Mobile, Alabama.

== Mod Mobilian Records ==
In 2013, Mod Mobilian Records co-released El Cantador's EP Translation Wave with This Is American Music.
Mod Mobilian Records and This Is American Music co-released New Orleans group Hurray for the Riff Raff's album My Dearest Darkest Neighbor on July 1, 2013.
