= Hurray for the Riff Raff =

American band

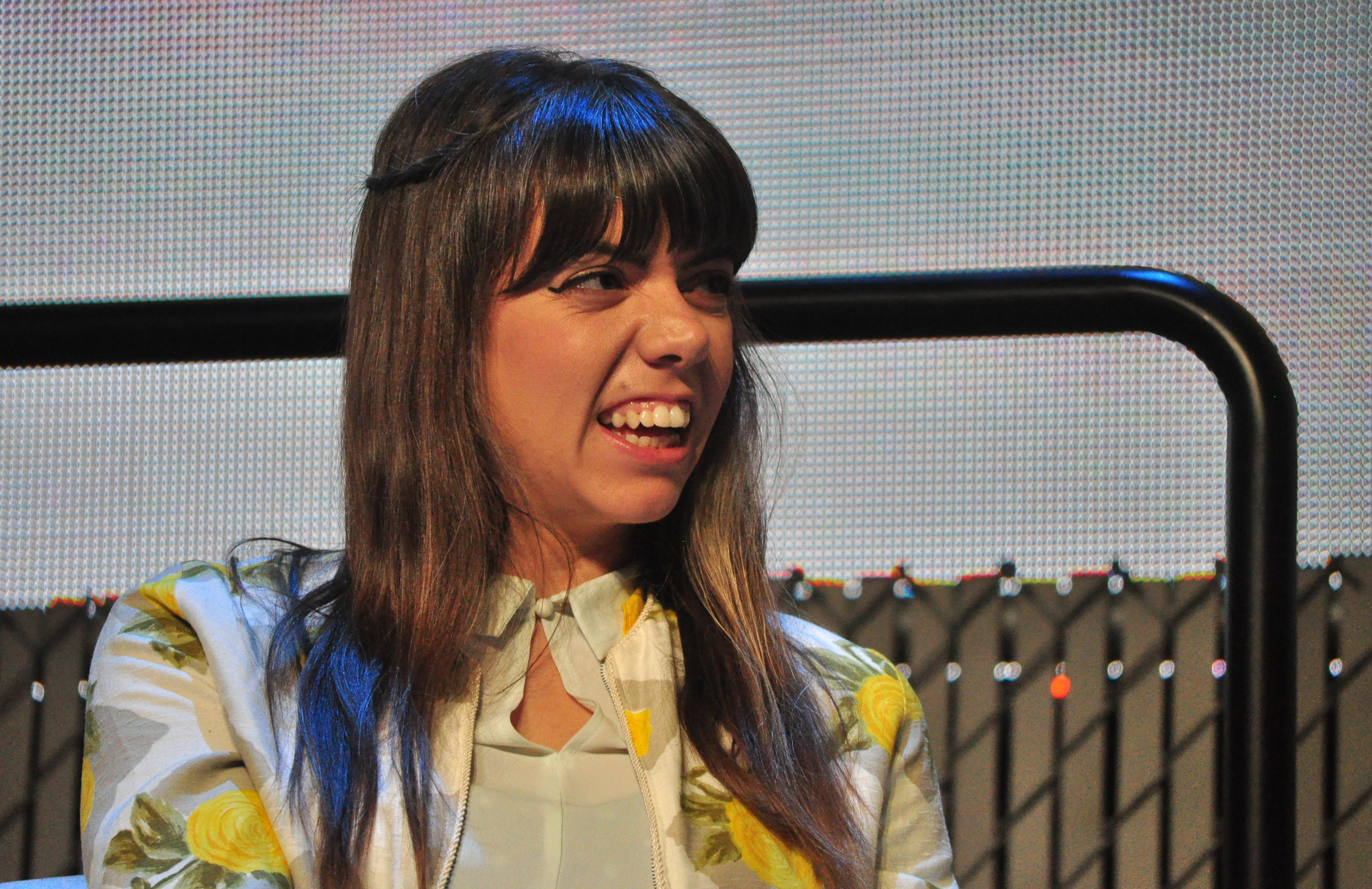
- Alynda Segarra, the band's frontperson, in 2016

Background information
- Origin: New Orleans, Louisiana, U.S.
- Genres: Americana
- Years active: 2007–present
- Labels: Born to Win; Nonesuch; ATO; Loose Music
- Members: Alynda Segarra
- Website: hurrayfortheriffraff.com

Hurray for the Riff Raff is an American band formed in New Orleans in 2007 by Alynda Mariposa Segarra, a singer-songwriter from the Bronx, New York.

As Segarra's project, the group originally performed different styles of folk music while releasing several albums independently.

== Background ==
Alynda Mariposa Segarra (formerly known as Alynda Lee) was raised by their aunt and uncle in the Bronx where they developed an early appreciation for doo-wop and Motown. They are of Puerto Rican heritage.

Segarra became a regular attendee of hardcore punk shows at ABC No Rio when they were young. They left their home in the Bronx at age 17, spending time crossing North America, hopping freight trains.

Around 2007, Segarra became a part of the Dead Man Street Orchestra, a hobo band Time magazine documented in a 2007 photo essay. Segarra traveled with the group for two years, releasing two independent albums and embarking on freight train tours across the country.

== Musical career ==
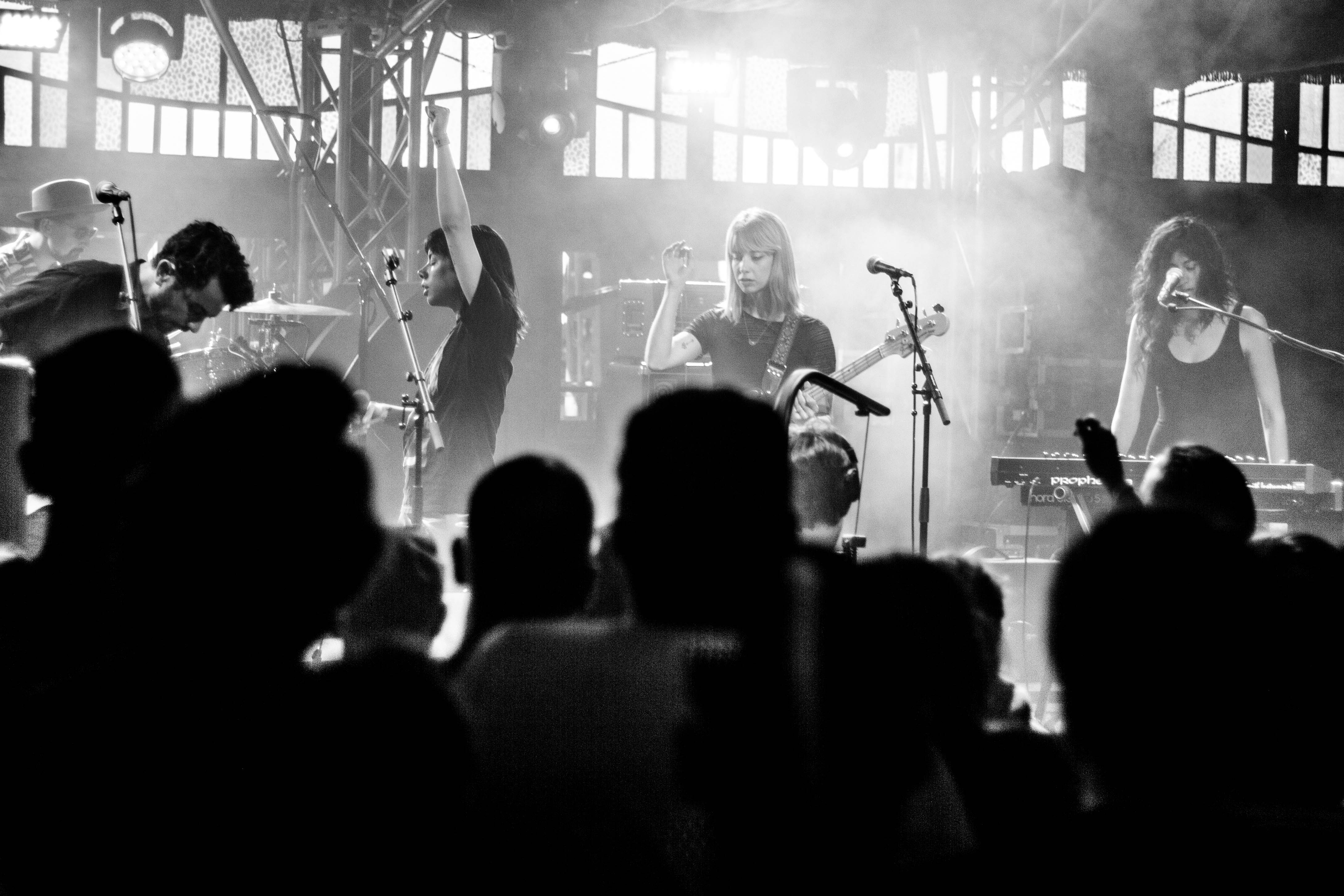
Hurray for the Riff Raff at Haldern Pop Festival 2017.

In 2008, Segarra self-released Hurray for the Riff Raff's first studio album, It Don't Mean I Don't Love You, followed by another self-released album, Young Blood Blues, in 2010, which was dedicated to the memory of Marcella Grace Eiler. In February 2011, Hurray for the Riff Raff were featured in an article in UK newspaper The Times based around the HBO TV series Treme, with their track "Daniella" having been included in the show's selection of New Orleans' essential songs.

On March 21, 2011, Hurray for the Riff Raff released their self-titled CD on Loose Music in Europe, composed of Segarra's favorite songs from the band's two previous records. Tracks from this indie-label debut release by the band received airplay on BBC Radio 2 and BBC Radio 6 Music.

In May 2012, Hurray for the Riff Raff released Look Out Mama on their own label, Born to Win Records, as well as on Loose Music in Europe. No Depression said it "sounds like something The Band would’ve had playing on a Victorola while making Music From Big Pink in Woodstock." The album was recorded in Nashville, Tennessee at The Bomb Shelter Studios and produced by Andrija Tokic (Alabama Shakes). The record features the single "End of the Line".

My Dearest Darkest Neighbor was then released on July 1, 2013, through Mod Mobilian Records and This Is American Music. The album was previously available only as a Kickstarter reward and in limited local release and featured handmade covers. Tracks on the record include songs by Townes Van Zandt, Billie Holiday, Leadbelly, John Lennon, Lucinda Williams, Joni Mitchell, Hank Williams, and George Harrison, and features Segarra's interpretation of Gillian Welch's "Ruination Day".

The Wall Street Journal describes Segarra's singing thus: "She has a subtle, expressive voice that she wraps around songs that draw on the sounds and styles of the American South, and her lyrics often take unconventional tack on traditional subjects".

Spin previewed a video of the band's song "St. Roch Blues".

In February 2014, Hurray for the Riff Raff had their ATO Records debut with Small Town Heroes. The record featured “The Body Electric,” a song that NPR's Ann Powers called “The Political Song of the Year” in 2014 and says the album "sweeps across eras and genres with grace and grit."

Describing Segarra's music, NPR says "Segarra's morning-after alto might be the least showy great voice to hit the national scene this year."

In early July 2016, the band played the Danish festival of Roskilde to an enthusiastic audience. In December 2016, they announced a new record, The Navigator, on Pitchfork with the first single from the album, "Rican Beach." The album was released on March 10, 2017, on ATO Records.

In late 2018, Segarra joined organizers of the Newport Folk Festival to travel to Puerto Rico and deliver instruments to various public schools. During that visit, Segarra played their first concert at La Respuesta in Santurce.

In 2019, Hurray for the Riff Raff's "Pa'lante" won Best Music Video at the SXSW Film Festival Jury and Specials Awards.

In 2021, Nonesuch Records announced Hurray for the Riff Raff's debut album on the label. Life on Earth was released on February 18, 2022. Its eleven new “nature punk” tracks on the theme of survival are "music for a world in flux—songs about thriving, not just surviving, while disaster is happening." Leading up to its release, Stereogum made it their album of the week, noting that the album's "sonic backdrop is fluid yet unmistakable no matter what form it takes. Even at their most synthetic, these tracks come across as earthy and alive—an extension of their environment. Even at their smallest and quietest, they feel huge." The album was met with critical acclaim upon its release.

Hurray for the Riff Raff released their eighth studio album The Past Is Still Alive on February 23, 2024. The Associated Press named the album to its list of the best work from 2024, calling it a "beautiful portrayal of the U.S." and noting that Segarra pulled from their background as a hitchhiker, train hopper and outsider artist to document adventures "that can only happen far from home".

== Personal life ==
Segarra lives in Chicago, is non-binary, and uses they/them pronouns.

== Discography ==
=== Studio albums ===
Year	Title	Label
2008	It Don't Mean I Don't Love You	self-released
2010	Young Blood Blues	self-released
2012	Look Out Mama	Born to Win Records / Loose Music
2013	My Dearest Darkest Neighbor	Mod Mobilian Records/This Is American Music
2014	Small Town Heroes	ATO Records
2017	The Navigator	ATO Records
2022	Life on Earth	Nonesuch Records
2024	The Past Is Still Alive	Nonesuch Records

=== Live albums ===
Year	Title	Label
2012	Live at 2012 New Orleans Jazz & Heritage Festival	Loose Music
2026	Live Forever	Nonesuch Records

=== Others ===
Year	Title	Label
2007	Crossing the Rubicon (EP)	out of print
2011	Hurray for the Riff Raff (Compilation)	Loose Music
