= Last Chance Records =

American independent record label

- Founded: 2007
- Founder: Travis Hill
- Genre: Rock, Americana, indie rock, alternative rock
- Country of origin: United States
- Location: Little Rock, Arkansas
- Official website: www.lastchancerecords.com

Last Chance Records is a Little Rock, Arkansas-based independent record label specializing in Americana, and indie rock. The label was founded by and is owned by Travis Hill.

== Roster ==
- Adam Faucett
- Andrew Bryant
- Austin Lucas
- Bap Kennedy
- Brent Best
- Drag the River
- JKutchma
- John Paul Keith
- Kevin Kerby
- Micah Schnabel
- Motel Mirrors
- Roger Hoover
- The Small Ponds
- Two Cow Garage
- American Aquarium
- Glossary
- John Moreland
