= This Is American Music =

American independent record label

- Founded: 2009
- Founder: Corey Flegel, Jay Cooper, Nick Nichols, Sean Courtney, Daniel Tribble (2009-2012)
- Genre: Americana, rock, alternative country
- Country of origin: U.S.
- Location: Atlanta, Georgia
- Official website: thisisamericanmusic.com

This is American Music (also known as TIAM) is an American independent record label that specializes in rock and Americana music, particularly by artists from the Southeastern United States. It was formed in 2011.

== History ==
The idea for the label came from co-founder Corey Flegel's experience of going out on tour with Murfreesboro, Tennessee's Glossary for years, where he became fast friends with them and other bands in their circle (The Dexateens, Vulture Whale, The Only Sons, Duquette Johnston (Verbena) The Bohannons, etc.). Flegel came up with the idea in 2010 of creating a blog to post concert dates and other material about the group of bands. The website was called "This Is American Music", named after a tour some of the bands had undertaken a few years previously. The label was an offshoot of the blog, and began releasing records in 2011.

Characterized by No Depression magazine as "a record label that is more of a family than a business," the management team is spread out across the Southeast, with the team based in Atlanta, Georgia, Auburn, Alabama, Chattanooga, Tennessee, Little Rock, Arkansas, and Mississippi. TIAM provides bands with marketing, touring, legal, song licensing and placement guidance. TIAM releases music in digital and physical formats.

== Roster ==
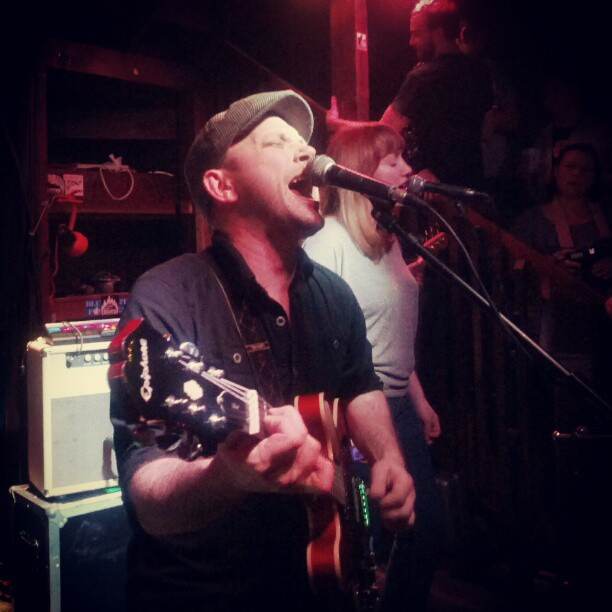
Joey and Kelly Kneiser of Glossary at the Holiday Hangout in Little Rock, Arkansas

- 13ghosts (Birmingham, AL)
- Bohannons (Chattanooga, TN)
- Bonnie Whitmore (Austin, TX)
- Browan Lollar (Muscle Shoals, AL)
- Cosmonaut On Vacation (Birmingham, AL)
- Dana Swimmer (Athens, GA)
- The District Attorneys (Athens/Atlanta, GA)
- Doc Feldman & the LD50 (Lexington, KY)
- Dorado (Birmingham, AL)
- El Cantador (Mobile, AL)
- Ghost Shirt (Columbus, OH)
- Glossary (Murfreesboro, TN)
- Great Peacock (Nashville, TN)
- The Holy Ghost Electric Show (Oxford, MS)
- Hurray For The Riff Raff (New Orleans, LA)
- Joey Kneiser (Murfreesboro, TN)
- Kelly Kneiser (Murfreesboro, TN)
- Kent Goolsby & the Gold Standard (Nashville, TN)
- The Kernal (Jackson, TN)
- Lauderdale (Muscle Shoals, AL)
- Magnolia Mountain (Cincinnati, OH)
- National Grain (Atlanta, GA)
- The Only Sons (Murfreesboro, TN)
- Party Dolls (Atlanta, GA)
- The Pollies (Muscle Shoals, AL)
- Porter and the Pollies (Muscle Shoals, AL)
- Roger Bryan & The Orphans (Buffalo, NY)
- Some Dark Holler (Birmingham, AL)
- Surf Bored (San Francisco, CA)
- Tedo Stone (Atlanta, GA)
- Teen Getaway (Birmingham, AL)
- Vulture Whale (Birmingham, AL)

== Discography ==
- 13ghosts, Liar's Melody (2010)
- Bohannons, Days of Echo EP (2010)
- Bohannons, Xmas in Vietnam (2011)
- Bohannons, Buzz Me In B-sides (2012)
- Bohannons, Unaka Rising (2012)
- Bonnie Whitmore, There I Go Again (2013)
- Browan Lollar, For the Givers and the Takers EP (2012)
- Cosmonaut On Vacation, Let the Moment Land (2013)
- Dana Swimmer, Veloce (2013)
- The District Attorneys, Slowburner (2012)
- The District Attorneys, Jr. EP (2012)
- The District Attorneys, Light Years/In Your Dreams (2012)
- Doc Feldman & the LD50, Sundowning at the Station (2013)
- Dorado, Anger, Hunger, Love and the Fear of Death (2013)
- El Cantador, Fools for Light∞ (2011)
- El Cantador, Translation Wave∞ (2013)
- Ghost Shirt, Daniel (2010)
- Glossary, Long Live All of Us‡ (2011)
- Glossary, Xmas EP (2013)
- Great Peacock, S/T EP (2013)
- Great Peacock, "Tennessee" single (2013)
- Have Gun Will, Travel, Fiction, Fact, or Folktale? (2013)
- Hurray For The Riff Raff, My Dearest Darkest Neighbor∞ (2013)
- Joey Kneiser, All-night Bedroom Revival (2010)
- Joey Kneiser, Moonlight for the Graveyard Heart (2012)
- Kelly Kneiser, S/T EP (2010)
- Kent Goolsby, Trophies of Youth (2013)
- The Kernal, Farewellhello (2013)
- The Kernal, Green, Green Sky/Tennessee Sun 7" (2013)
- Lauderdale, Moving On (2011)
- Magnolia Mountain, Nothing As It Was (2009)
- Magnolia Mountain, Redbird Green double album (2010)
- Magnolia Mountain, Town & Country double album (2012)
- Magnolia Mountain, Beloved (2013)
- Mark Utley, Four Chords and a Lie 12" (2013)
- National Grain, S/T (2006)
- The Only Sons, American Stranger (2011)
- The Only Sons, When The New Wears Off (2012)
- Party Dolls, Love Wars Baby (2014)
- The Pollies, Where the Lies Begin (2012)
- Porter and the Pollies, S/T (2013)
- Roger Bryan & The Orphans, 37 (2011)
- Some Dark Holler, S/T EP (2011)
- Some Dark Holler, Hollow Chest (2012)
- Surf Bored, The Urge single (2013)
- Surf Bored, Sing / Hum single (2013)
- Tedo Stone, Happy EP (2012)
- Tedo Stone, Good Go Bad (2013)
- Teen Getaway, Hits and Missives (2013)
- Vulture Whale, Long Time Listener First Time Caller (2011)

‡ Double dagger symbol denotes co-release with Last Chance Records
∞ Infinity symbol denotes co-release Mod Mobilian Records

Compilations

- Music for the Mountains (2011)
- A Frankenstrangler Christmas (2012)
- This Is American Music (A Sampler) (2013)

== Video ==
- A Very Glossary Christmas (2013)‡ - Glossary, with cameos by Cory Branan, Birdcloud, Austin Lucas, and the "fabled" Courtney Koozie

‡ Double dagger symbol denotes co-release with Last Chance Records

== Partnerships ==
- Last Chance Records
- Mod Mobilian Records

== See also ==
- List of record labels
