= Se compran colchones =

Mexican audio recording

"Se compran colchones" (transl. "Mattresses are bought" or "We are buying mattresses"), also known as "Fierro Viejo" (transl. "Scrap Metal"), is an audio recording frequently played by itinerant vendors in Mexico City, as well as elsewhere in Mexico, to solicit the purchase of used household metal items, including mattresses, refrigerators, stoves, washing machines, and microwaves. The pickup trucks playing the recording are so numerous and ubiquitous that the recording has entered the popular culture of Mexico City.

== Lyrics ==
Spanish original

Se compran
colchones,
tambores,
refrigeradores,
estufas,
lavadoras,
microondas,
¿o algo de fierro viejo que vendan?

English translation

We are buying
mattresses,
bed frames,
refrigerators,
stoves,
washing machines,
microwaves,
or any old iron you're selling?

== History ==
It was initially recorded on a cassette in 2005 by a nine year-old girl named María del Mar Terrón at the request of her father, Marco Antonio, a fierroviejero (an itinerant purchaser of used metal items). The recording is used by almost all the fierroviejeros in Mexico City and other Mexican states.

María is popularly nicknamed niña de fierro ("iron girl") or niña del fierro viejo ("girl of the metalwork peddler").

The recording was registered, but its authors do not collect music royalties from fierroviejeros. Mr. Terrón declared: "Using that recording feels good because, in some way, you are doing your part to keep those people working."

== In popular culture ==
The recording has been remixed to create songs and telephone ringtones. It has been used in series and films set in Mexico City, such as Cindy la Regia, Chingolandia, and Emilia Pérez. On March 8, 2021, the feminist collective Fieras Fierras published a remix in which they rewrote the lyrics of "Se compran colchones" to Se buscan personas, aliadas, guerreras, (...) en contra del fierro viejo que abunda ("People, allies, warriors, (...) are wanted against the old iron that abounds" or "We are looking for people, allies, warriors, (...) against the old iron that abounds").

== See also ==
- Junk man
- Karung guni
- Rag-and-bone man
- Waste collector
- Zabbaleen
