= Marcella Grace Eiler =

American social activist

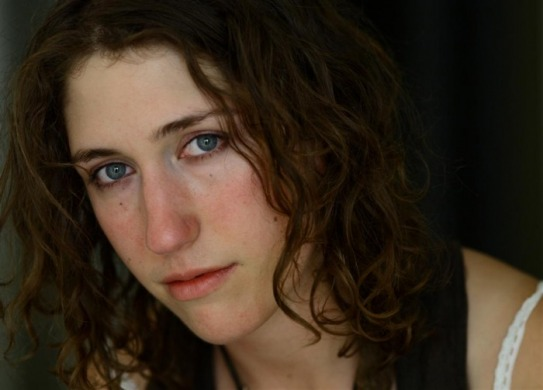
Marcella "Sali" Grace Eiler was an American activist and dancer who was murdered in 2008 while travelling in Mexico.

Marcella "Sali" Grace Eiler (September 30, 1987 – September 15, 2008) was an American social activist from Eugene, Oregon, who was raped and murdered in Mexico two weeks before her 21st birthday. For the last three years of her life, she had been living and working intermittently in Oaxaca's provincial capital, Oaxaca de Juárez, as a dance teacher and social activist, and acted as an observer for an indigenous rights organization.

Eiler's body was found on September 24, 2008, near the Oaxaca town of San José del Pacifico, where she had arrived to dance at a fundraiser. Newspapers reported that after Mexico City resident Omar Yoguez Singu admitted that he had killed Eiler with a machete, citizens oversaw his delivery into police custody. He was found guilty of murder and is serving his sentence in a Oaxacan prison.

In 2024, two influencers posted videos helping a homeless man which generated criticism. Social media users identified the homeless man, who called himself "trapito" and identified himself only as "Omar," as Omar Singu who apparently was released an undetermined year, after that they decided to cut contact with him.

== See also ==
- Brad Will
