= On My Way to Absence =

Studio album by Damien Jurado
- Released: 5 May 2005
- Length: 41:33
- Label: Secretly Canadian
- Producer: Eric Fisher

Damien Jurado chronology
Where Shall You Take Me? (2003)	On My Way to Absence (2005)	And Now That I'm in Your Shadow (2006)

On My Way to Absence is Damien Jurado's sixth full-length album. It was released in 2005 and was Jurado's second release on Secretly Canadian records. The album was produced by his frequent collaborator Eric Fisher. Jurado has referred to the album as "a tribute to jealousy".

== Songs ==
=== "White Center" ===
In the album's opening track, "White Center", Jurado's barely comprehensible vocal slur tells a tale of small town murder. The instrumentation combines "lush strings", a "quiet acoustic guitar strum and gentle piano".

=== "Lottery" ===
"Lottery" features backing vocals by Rosie Thomas. The track is "gentle, almost like a lullaby" and is comparable to "Matinee" from Jurado's preceding LP, Where Shall You Take Me?.

=== "Big Decision" ===
"Big Decision" combines "minimal electronics, keyboards, and samples" with "quivering strings" and "melancholic understate[d]" vocals to create one of the most optimistic tracks on the album.

=== "Lion Tamer" ===
"Lion Tamer" is reminiscent of his 1999 LP Rehearsals for Departure, particularly the tracks "The Tragedy" and "Honey Baby". He sings the "apathetic" vocals with "coarser" and "more forceful" vocals to a "dreamy haze of piano [and] guitar".

=== "Fuel" ===
The "stripped-down and melancholy" rock tune "Fuel" is the dark confessional of a "merciless small-town killer".

=== "Simple Hello" ===
Crooked Fingers lead singer Eric Bachmann provides backing vocals on this "smoldering rock" track that sounds like it belongs on Jason Molina's Songs: Ohia.

=== "Sucker" ===
Like "Lion Tamer", "Sucker" sounds like the material from Rehearsals for Departure. The folk-rock track is "upbeat" and "poppy".

=== "I Am the Mountain" ===
"I Am the Mountain" is a reworking of the track from his 2004 EP, Just in Time for Something. It is reminiscent of Neil Young and Crazy Horse, a "raw", "stripped-down and melancholy rock" tune with an alt-country feel. The "bombastic" track would fit in on Trials & Errors from Secretly Canadian labelmate Magnolia Electric Co. and breaks up the album's "folkier elements" "with bells and strings, minimal piano and brushed drums".

=== "Night Out for the Downer" ===
"Night Out for the Downer" is another reworking of a Just in Time for Something track.

=== "A Jealous Heart Is a Heavy Heart" ===
The album concludes with a tale of "sunken relationships and thwarted dreams", "A Jealous Heart Is a Heavy Heart". The tune features "violin, electric guitar, and the echo of distantly otherworld keyboard noise" then it, and the album, "fade into oblivion" with "a lonely piano coda and a desperate plea" to 'Grow old with me'.

== Reception ==
Professional ratings
Aggregate scores
Source	Rating
Metacritic	74/100
Review scores
Source	Rating
Allmusic	4/5 stars
Pitchfork	(7.3/10)
Stylus	(A−)
Uncut	4/10 stars

In his review of On My Way to Absence Todd Martens of Billboard favorably compares Jurado to Nick Drake, Iron & Wine, Cat Power and Elliott Smith. Brian Howe of Pitchfork writes that "while it isn't Jurado's most daring work, it is among his most immediately engaging" and refers to the album's melody as "rich, fragrant and utterly human". The songs "resonate with the verbal economy and hallucinatory clarity", Howe compares them to the short stories of Raymond Carver. Greg Elias of The Good 5 Cent Cigar calls the album "more of a pop album than anything he has done" and "a testament to his ability to maintain artistic integrity in constantly shifting atmospheres" proclaiming that Jurado is "among the best songwriters of his time and ilk". Peter Funk of Stylus calls the album Jurado's "saddest though finest efforts to date". Uncut calls On My Way to Absence a "self-styled tribute to jealousy" and his "most diverse record yet". However, Reed Fischer from CMJ New Music Monthly writes that Jurado's "detachment is effective about half the time, [but] it breeds indifference" and that the "superb" guest vocals from Rosie Thomas and Eric Bachmann "aren't enough to cobble together the king of compelling, sympathetic portrait he's more than capable of painting".

== Track listing ==
1. "White Center" – 3:04
2. "Lottery" – 4:00
3. "Big Decision" – 4:32
4. "Lion Tamer" – 3:49
5. "Fuel" – 2:16
6. "Simple Hello" – 3:17
7. "Sucker" – 3:40
8. "I Am the Mountain" – 3:26
9. "Night Out for the Downer" – 4:09
10. "Northbound" – 1:38
11. "Icicle" – 3:13
12. "A Jealous Heart Is a Heavy Heart" – 4:28

== Personnel ==
- Damien Jurado – composer, guitar, vocals
- Eric Bachmann – vocals
- David Broecker – bass, guitar, radio
- Joel Cuplin – saxophone
- Martin Feveyear – mixing
- Eric Fisher – audio engineer, audio production, Design, E-Bow, engineer, glockenspiel, guitar, keyboards, layout design, mixing, organ, percussion, piano, producer, sampling
- Casey Foubert – percussion, piano
- Troy Glessner – mastering
- John Golden – bass, piano, vocals
- Josh Golden – piano, vocals
- Rose Johnson – vocals
- Andy Myers – drums, trumpet, vocals
- Rosie Thomas – vocals
- Seth Warren – glockenspiel, strings
- Justin Wilmore – double bass
