= Richard Swift (musician) =

American singer-songwriter (1977-2018)

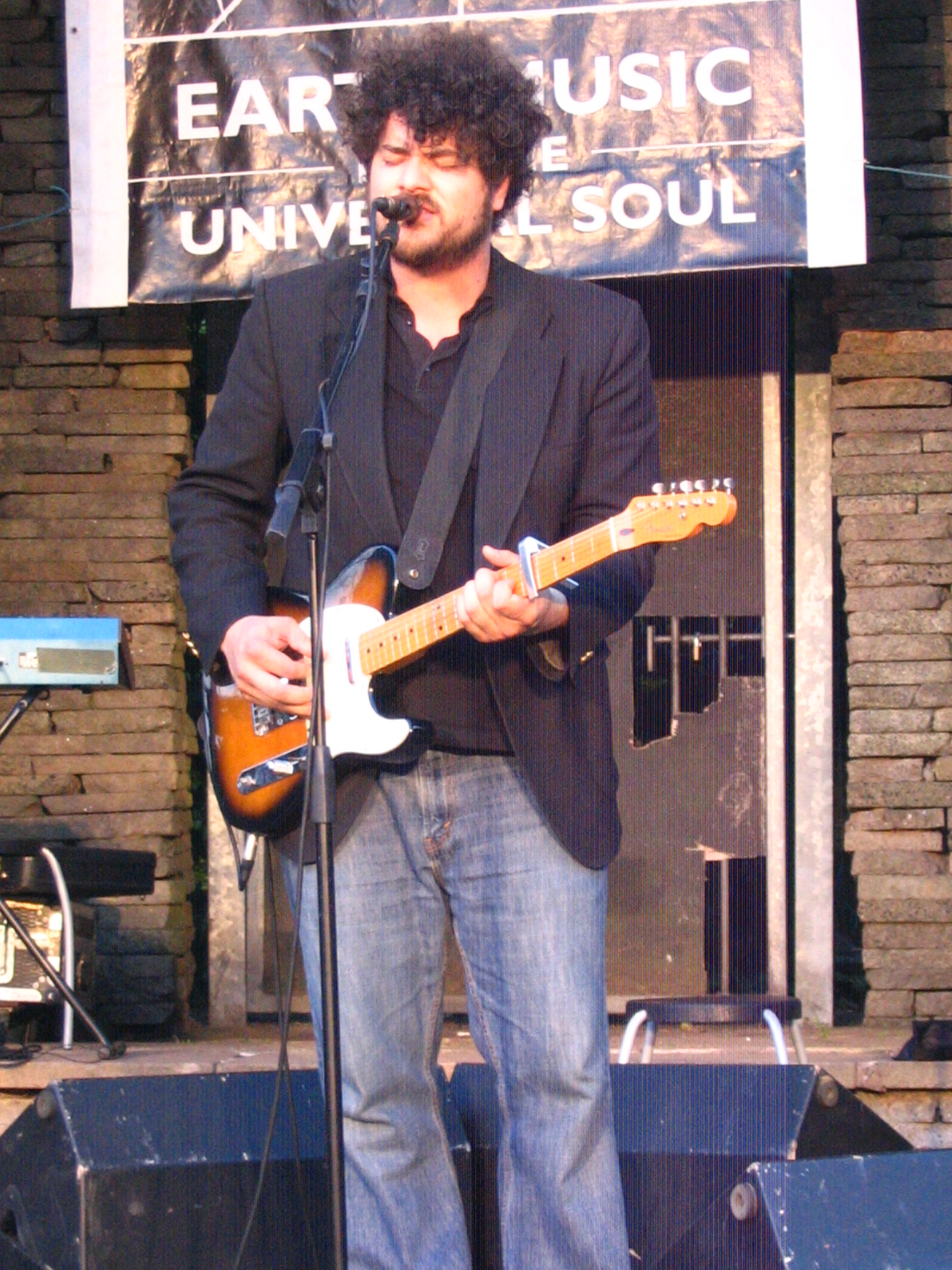
- Swift at the mac, Birmingham, England, in 2007

Background information
- Born: March 16, 1977; California, U.S.
- Died: July 3, 2018 (aged 41) Tacoma, Washington, U.S.
- Genres: Indie rock; indie pop; lo-fi
- Instruments: Guitar; bass guitar; vocals; keyboards; drums
- Years active: 2000–2018
- Labels: Polydor; Secretly Canadian; Velvet Blue Music
- Website: richardswift.us

Richard Swift (born Ricardo Ochoa; March 16, 1977 – July 3, 2018) was an American singer, songwriter, multi-instrumentalist, producer and short-film maker. He was the founder, owner, and recording engineer of National Freedom, a recording studio located in Oregon, and worked as producer, collaborator, muse and influencer for acts including the Shins, Damien Jurado, David Bazan (of Pedro the Lion), Foxygen, Jessie Baylin, Nathaniel Rateliff, Lucius, Lonnie Holley, the Mynabirds, Wake Owl, Laetitia Sadier of Stereolab, Gardens & Villa, Cayucas, Fleet Foxes, Mango Safari and Guster. Swift was a former member of Starflyer 59, the Shins, and the Arcs. He was also a part of the Black Keys' live band during their 2014–2015 tour, performing as their touring bassist and backing singer.

== Early life ==
Born in California on March 16, 1977, with the name Ricardo Ochoa, into a musical Quaker family, Swift started performing and singing in churches at an early age. In his youth, his family moved frequently, spending time in rural locations in Minnesota, Utah, and Oregon. As a teenager, he worked at a farm near International Falls, Minnesota.

== Career ==
=== Solo ===
Ricardo "Dicky" Ochoa released his first solo album under the name Dicky Ochoa on Metro One Recordings in 2000. While in 2002 released an album called Company with Frank Lenz and Elijah Thomson. Also in 2002 he was a musician on the Promise Keepers Live Worship album. In 2001, Swift moved to Southern California to pursue his solo recording career. That same year, he recorded Walking Without Effort, an initially unreleased album with drummer and producer Frank Lenz. He recorded much of his early music on a four-track cassette recorder. From 2002 to 2005, he released four small pressings of "properly manufactured" 7" vinyl singles via Velvet Blue Music. Swift also released The Novelist in 2003 and Walking Without Effort (recorded in 2001) in 2005 and combined the two albums to create the double-disc The Richard Swift Collection Vol. 1 released by Leftwing Recordings in August 2004. In December 2003, American webzine Somewhere Cold voted The Novelist EP of the Year on their 2003 Somewhere Cold Awards Hall of Fame list, while a year later, in December 2004, they ranked The Richard Swift Collection Vol. 1 No. 5 on their 2004 Somewhere Cold Awards Hall of Fame list.

He signed to indie label Secretly Canadian, who then re-released the Collection in 2005. In 2007, Secretly Canadian and Polydor issued Swift's proper follow-up album, Dressed Up For the Letdown. Later in the year Swift met Wilco frontman Jeff Tweedy during a taping of the BBC program Later...with Jools Holland. Tweedy asked Swift to support Wilco on their Sky Blue Sky US tour. During the tour Tweedy invited Swift to record at their Loft studios in Chicago.

In October 2007, Swift started his fourth album at the Wilco Loft studios. In April 2008, Secretly Canadian released a double EP named Richard Swift As Onasis. In August 2008, Swift released an EP entitled Ground Trouble Jaw as a free digital download. In April 2009, Secretly Canadian released The Atlantic Ocean. Co-produced by Mark Ronson, the album featured special guests such as Pat Sansone, Casey Foubert (Sufjan Stevens), Sean Lennon, and Ryan Adams. In 2011, he released another solo EP entitled Walt Wolfman.

His final solo album, The Hex, was released in September 2018, two months after his death. On November 1, 2024, Secretly Canadian released the career-spanning posthumous compilation 4 Hits & a Miss - The Essential Richard Swift.

=== Producer and back-up artist ===
In addition to the music recorded under his own name and producing work, he was also briefly a keyboardist in the band Starflyer 59 in 2002 and 2003, playing live shows and contributing to their 2003 album Old. He also fronted his own electronic music side-project, Instruments of Science and Technology. In December 2005, Somewhere Cold again listed Swift in their year-end list, ranking Instruments of Science and Technology No. 9 on their 2005 Somewhere Cold Awards Hall of Fame list.

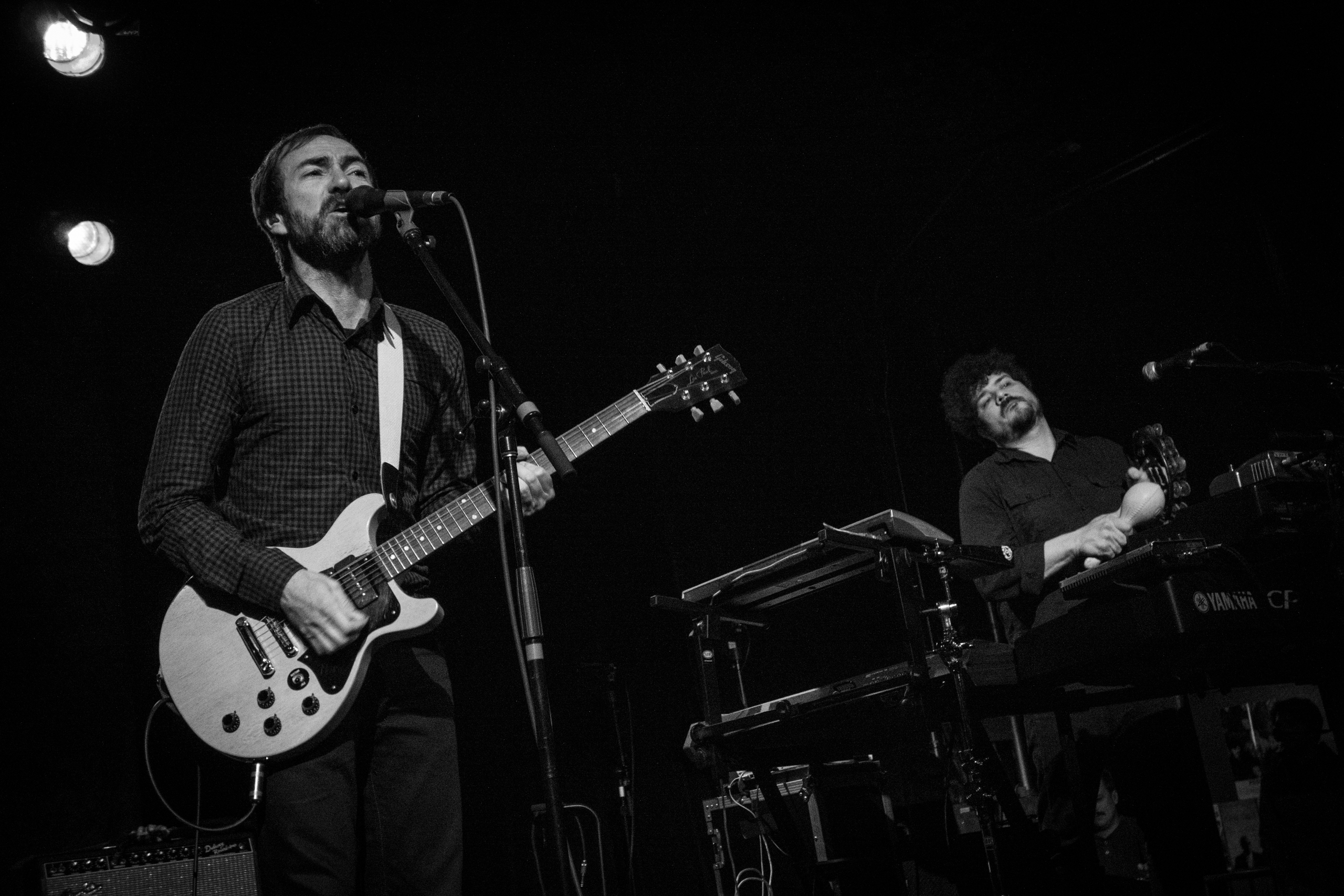
Swift performing with the Shins in December 2012

Swift also played on multiple Michael Knott albums, CUSH, Kat Jones, Pony Express, Damien Jurado, and worked with Frank Lenz on Frank's solo material. In a 2007 interview, Swift commented on his techniques as a producer and engineer, stating "Most of my recording techniques come from looking at photos on the inside of Sly and the Family Stone or Beatles LPs, or from watching Sympathy for the Devil and thinking, 'Oh! That's where they put the mic!'" Swift is known to often provide hefty contributions as a multi-instrumentalist to the albums he produces. In 2009, he began spending more time working with other artists as producer and band member. May 2010 saw the release of fellow Secretly Canadian recording artist Damien Jurado's record Saint Bartlett. In 2010, Swift also produced The Mynabirds' What We Lose in the Fire We Gain in the Flood and co-produced Laetitia Sadier's album The Trip. He joined the Shins in 2011 and began touring with the Black Keys as their bassist in 2014. In 2015, he produced the self-titled album for Nathaniel Rateliff & the Night Sweats.

== Personal life and death ==
Swift lived in Cottage Grove, Oregon, where he met his wife, Shealynn. They had three children.

On June 19, 2018, Pitchfork reported that Swift had been hospitalized in Tacoma, Washington, recovering from an undisclosed "life-threatening condition" and that a GoFundMe had been set up to help cover his medical expenses. He died on July 3, 2018, in Tacoma. Six days later, Swift's family released a statement confirming that he had suffered from alcohol addiction throughout his life, and that his death was ultimately caused by related "complications from hepatitis, as well as liver and kidney distress."

== Discography ==
=== As a solo artist ===
==== Albums ====
- The Novelist – US (2003)
- Walking Without Effort – US (recorded in 2001, released 2005)
- Dressed Up for the Letdown – US & UK (Secretly Canadian and Polydor, 2007)
- Music From the Films of R/Swift – Released under the name Instruments of Science & Technology – US (Secretly Canadian, 2008)
- Richard Swift As Onasis – US (Secretly Canadian, 2008)
- The Atlantic Ocean (Secretly Canadian, 2009)
- Library Catalog Music Series, Vol. 7: Music for Paradise Armor – Released under the name Instruments of Science & Technology (Asthmatic Kitty, 2010)
- The Hex (Secretly Canadian, 2018)

=== EPs and singles ===
- Buildings in America (2004)
- You're Lying (2004)
- P.S. It All Falls Down (2005)
- Nothing to Do with Foxy Boxing (2005)
- Beautifulheart (2006)
- Kisses for the Misses (single, 2007)
- The Songs of National Freedom (single, 2007)
- Ground Trouble Jaw (2008)
- Lady Luck (single, 2009)
- The Atlantic Ocean (2009)
- Walt Wolfman (2011)
- Kensington (2014)

=== Box-sets ===
- The Richard Swift Collection, Volume 1: The Novelist / Walking Without Effort – US (2005)

=== Compilations ===
- 4 Hits & a Miss - The Essential Richard Swift (Secretly Canadian, 2024)

=== As producer ===
- The Mynabirds – What We Lose in the Fire We Gain in the Flood (2010), Generals (album) (2012)
- Joshua James – From The Top of Willamette Mountain (2012)
- Foxygen – We Are the 21st Century Ambassadors of Peace & Magic (2013)
- Pure Bathing Culture – Moon Tides (2013)
- Nathaniel Rateliff & The Night Sweats – Nathaniel Rateliff & the Night Sweats (2015), Tearing at the Seams (2018)
- Damien Jurado – Saint Bartlett (2010), Maraqopa (2012), Brothers and Sisters of the Eternal Son (2014), Visions of Us on the Land (2016)
- Guster – Evermotion (2015)
- David Bazan – Care (2017)
- Born Ruffians – Uncle, Duke & The Chief (2018)
- Matt Hopper – Jersey Finger (2010)
- Kevin Morby – City Music (2017)
- Lonnie Holley - National Freedom (2020)
