= Caught in the Trees =

Studio album by Damien Jurado
- Released: 9 September 2008
- Recorded: 2007–2008
- Genre: Indie rock
- Label: Secretly Canadian
- Producers: Kory Kruckenberg and Casey Foubert

Damien Jurado chronology
And Now That I'm in Your Shadow (2006)	Caught in the Trees (2008)	Saint Bartlett (2010)

Professional ratings
Aggregate scores
Source	Rating
Metacritic	75/100
Review scores
Source	Rating
AllMusic	4/5 stars
Paste Magazine	(78/100)
Pitchfork Media	(7.3/10)
PopMatters	(8/10)
Slant Magazine	4.5/5 stars

Caught in the Trees is a 2008 album released by Indie rock musician Damien Jurado. It is his eighth full-length album release.

Pitchfork Media gave the album a favorable review, calling it "a rock solid outing from backing bandmates Jenna Conrad and Eric Fisher supporting some of Jurado's best songwriting to date". Paste Magazine also praised the album, writing that it "alternates between lean, biting folk-rock and haunting ballads that seem to float up from deep, dark wells. With his pair of bandmate friends by his side, he sounds less alone than ever before, and Conrad's pliant harmonies are a great boon."

== Track listing ==
Song	Writers	Length
"Gillian Was a Horse"	Damien Jurado, Jenna Conrad	3:20
"Trials"	Damien Jurado	3:22
"Caskets"	Damien Jurado	2:58
"Coats Of Ice"	Damien Jurado	3:02
"Go First"	Damien Jurado	4:27
"Sorry is For You"	Damien Jurado	1:07
"Last Rights"	Damien Jurado	4:11
"Dimes"	Damien Jurado	3:43
"Everything Trying"	Damien Jurado	3:25
"Sheets"	Damien Jurado	4:16
"Paper Kite"	Damien Jurado	3:38
"Best Dress"	Jenna Conrad	4:12
"Predictive Living"	Damien Jurado	2:50
