= A Very Rosie Christmas =

Studio album by Rosie Thomas
- Released: November 24, 2008
- Recorded: 2008
- Genre: Christmas
- Length: 49:17
- Label: Sing-A-Long
- Producers: Rosie Thomas, Josh Myers

Rosie Thomas chronology
These Friends of Mine (2006)	A Very Rosie Christmas (2008)	With Love (2012)

A Very Rosie Christmas is the fifth album by American singer-songwriter Rosie Thomas, released in 2008. It is her first holiday album and features vocals from her friends and family members. The album mixes original songs with cover versions.

Thomas said of the album: "I've always loved to work on Christmas songs; Growing up, every Christmas Eve we entertained the family that came over 'cause my parents were musicians. I've had a blast doing this."

The album includes a comedy skit featuring Thomas's Sheila Saputo character. Damien Jurado guests on "Sheila's Christmas Miracle".

== Reception ==
PopMatters gave the album a 6/10 rating, with Ben Child calling it "a pleasant batch of jazz-pop Christmas songs". The Capital Times described the album as "cute", with Rob Thomas stating "She has a quirky but affecting voice, a wry sense of humor and a deep, questioning Christian faith, and brings them all to bear on this winsome collection." The Tucson Weekly gave it a positive review, with Stephen Seigel viewing Thomas's original songs as the highlights.

The album was included at number 35 in Rolling Stone's "40 Essential Christmas Albums", describing it as "charming and heartfelt". The Miami New Times included it in their "The Best Christmas Albums of 2008".

== Track listing ==
All songs written by Rosie Thomas unless otherwise stated.

1. "Christmastime Is Here" – 3:08 (Originally by Vince Guaraldi Trio)
2. "Why Can't It Be Christmastime All Year" – 4:25
3. "River" – 3:05 (Originally by Joni Mitchell)
4. "Winter Wonderland" – 3:23 (Music and lyrics by Felix Bernard & Richard B. Smith)
5. "Silent Night" – 4:14 (Music and lyrics by Joseph Mohr & Franz Gruber) (Arrangement by Josh Myers)
6. "O Come O Come Emmanuel" – 3:35 (Lyrics from Latin text by John Mason Neale) (Arrangement by Josh Myers)
7. "Snow Day" – 3:54
8. "Alone At Christmastime" – 2:59
9. "Christmas Don't Be Late" – 6:40 (Originally by The Chipmunks)
10. "Let It Snow" – 2:39 (Music and lyrics by Sammy Cahn & Jule Styne)
11. "Sheila's Christmas Miracle" – 8:54
12. "Rosie's Christmas Wish" – 2:21
