= Wedding Day =

Wedding Day may refer to:

- Wedding

== Other arts and media ==
- Rebecca's Wedding Day, a 1914 American short comedy film starring Fatty Arbuckle
- Dr. Kildare's Wedding Day, a 1941 drama film directed by Harold S. Bucquet
- Wedding Day (film), a 1942 Italian comedy film
- Wedding Day (game show), an Australian television series 1956-1957
- The Wedding Day (film), a 1960 Swedish comedy film
- The Wedding Day (play), a 1794 comedy play by the English writer Elizabeth Inchbald

== Music ==
- "Wedding Day at Troldhaugen" (Norwegian: Bryllupsdag på Troldhaugen), a piano piece composed by Edvard Grieg
- The Wedding Day (opera), a comic opera with music by Julian Edwards and a libretto by Stanislaus Stange
- Wedding Day, an album by Area

=== Songs ===
- "Wedding Day" (song), a 2014 song by Courtney Love
- "Wedding Day", a song by Ersel Hickey
- "Wedding Day", a song by Roy Orbison from Crying (1962)
- "Wedding Day", a song by Paul Young from Between Two Fires (1986)
- "Wedding Day", a song by UB40 from Labour of Love II (1989)
- "Wedding Day", a song by Rosie Thomas from When We Were Small (2001)
- "Wedding Day", a song by Alpha Rev from The Greatest Thing I've Ever Learned (2007)
- "Wedding Day", a duet by Heidi Klum and Seal from Seal's album System (2007)
- "Wedding Day", a song by Casting Crowns from Come to the Well (2011)
- "Wedding Day", a song by Tori Amos from Unrepentant Geraldines (2014)
- "Wedding Day", a song by the Bee Gees from This Is Where I Came In
- "Wedding Day", a song by Shturcite
- "Wedding Day", a song by Bon Jovi
- "She Moved Through the Fair", also called "Our Wedding Day", a folk song
