= These Friends of Mine =

These Friends of Mine may refer to:

- These Friends of Mine (album), an album by Rosie Thomas
- These Friends of Mine, the original name of the TV series Ellen, starring Ellen DeGeneres
