= The Horizon Just Laughed =

Studio album by Damien Jurado
- Released: May 4, 2018
- Genre: Indie folk
- Length: 37:19
- Label: Secretly Canadian
- Producer: Damien Jurado

Damien Jurado chronology
Visions of Us on the Land (2016)	The Horizon Just Laughed (2018)	In the Shape of a Storm (2019)

The Horizon Just Laughed is the thirteenth studio album by American rock musician Damien Jurado. It was released on May 4, 2018, by Secretly Canadian.

== Release ==
On March 9, 2018, Jurado announced the release of his new album, along with the single "Over Rainbows And Ranier".

== Critical reception ==
Professional ratings
Aggregate scores
Source	Rating
Metacritic	81/100
Review scores
Source	Rating
AllMusic	4.5/5 stars
Exclaim!	(8/10)
The Line of Best Fit	(8/10)
Pitchfork	(8/10)

The Horizon Just Laughed was met with "universal acclaim" reviews from critics. At Metacritic, which assigns a weighted average rating out of 100 to reviews from mainstream publications, this release received an average score of 81 based on 11 reviews. Aggregator Album of the Year gave the release an 80 out of 100 based on a critical consensus of 9 reviews.

== Track listing ==
All tracks are written by Damien Jurado.

No.	Title	Length
1.	"Allocate"	4:43
2.	"Dear Thomas Wolfe"	3:18
3.	"Percy Faith"	2:57
4.	"Over Rainbows and Rainier"	4:10
5.	"The Last Great Washington State"	6:20
6.	"Cindy Lee"	0:54
7.	"1973"	2:53
8.	"Marvin Kaplan"	3:04
9.	"Lou-Jean"	3:49
10.	"Florence-Jean"	2:26
11.	"Random Fearless"	2:45

== Charts ==
Chart (2018)	Peak position
US Independent Albums (Billboard)	35
US Heatseekers Albums (Billboard)	8
