= Jodymoon =

Dutch singer-songwriter duo

- Origin: Maastricht, Netherlands
- Genres: Indie, pop, folk, indie folk
- Years active: 2006–present
- Label: RLR
- Members: Digna Janssen; Johan Smeets
- Website: jodymoon.com

Jodymoon is a singer-songwriter duo from Maastricht, the Netherlands. Singer-pianist Digna Janssen and multi-instrumentalist Johan Smeets, who are a couple, formed the band in 2006. They describe their music as ‘a blend between singer-songwriter, folk, pop, roots and something else’. Jodymoon have released seven studio albums and a live double album, all of which have received critical acclaim.

Jodymoon have won the public's choice award of ‘The Grand Prize of the Netherlands’ (2008), over the last years they performed in Canada, UK, Spain, Italy, Belgium, Germany and the Netherlands. They also played as supporting act for Joan Armatrading, Damien Jurado, Tom McRae and others.

== Discography ==
- Look at Me Look at Me Don't Look at Me (2006)
- Never Gonna Find It in Another Story (2008)
- Who Are You Now (2010)
- The Life You Never Planned On (2012)
- All Is Waiting (2015)
- A Love Brand New (2019)
- Firestone (2021)
- The Best of Live 2013-2023 (2023)
- The machine (2025)
