= Tim Easton =

American musician

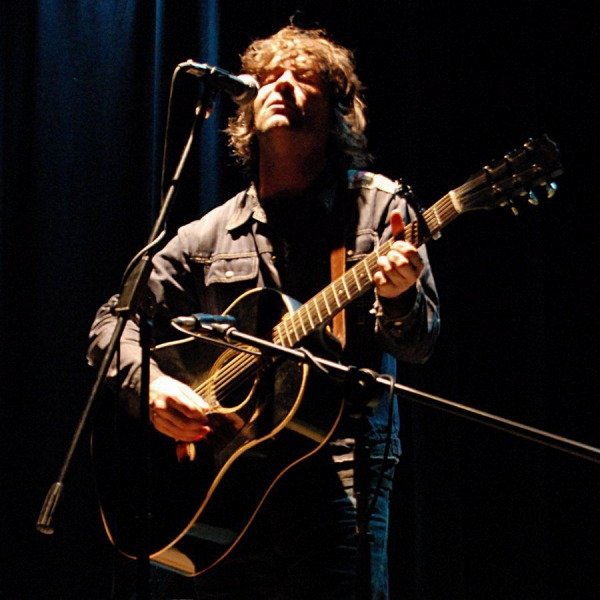
- Tim Easton at Sa Congregació, sa Pobla, Spain.

Background information
- Born: Timothy E. Easton; April 25, 1966 (age 60); Lewiston, New York, U.S.
- Genres: Rock, alternative, folk, blues
- Occupations: Musician, singer-songwriter
- Instruments: Vocals, guitar, keyboards, piano, bass, mandolin, harmonica
- Years active: 1997–present
- Labels: Campfire Propaganda (Independent), New West
- Formerly of: Kosher Spears, The Haynes Boys, Easton Stagger Phillips
- Website: www.timeaston.com

Timothy E. Easton (born April 25, 1966) is an American guitarist and singer-songwriter playing rock and roll, folk, and Americana music. His latest release, fIREHORSE was released on February 20, 2026.

== Biography ==
Timothy Easton was raised in Akron, Ohio, forming the band Kosher Spears while he was attending college. He traveled abroad for a time, busking in London, Paris, Spain, Italy, Yugoslavia, Czechoslovakia, and Ireland.

=== The Haynes Boys ===
On his return to the US in the mid-1990s, Easton joined the Haynes Boys with Freddie Free (guitar), Jovan Karcic (drums), and Aaron Rice (bass).

In 1996, they released their only album Haynes Boys (often referred to as Guardian Angel because of the cover illustration).

On June 23, 2015, Re-Vinyl Records reissued the album on vinyl with the originally intended cover art and updated liner notes.

The band kicked off a series of shows on June 25, 2015, in Columbus, Ohio, culminating with a June 28 show at the ComFest community festival in Columbus.

=== Solo career ===
When the members of the Haynes Boys split to pursue individual projects, Easton recorded his 1998 debut album Special 20 on Heathen Records, a label launched by Easton and his manager Blake Squires.

He subsequently relocated to California, and signed a deal with EMI Publishing and a record deal with New West Records. In 2001, he released The Truth About Us on which he was supported by Ken Coomer, John Sirratt, and Jay Bennett, all of Wilco.

Released in 2003, Break Your Mother's Heart featured Mike Campbell (guitar), Jim Keltner (drums), Jai Winding (piano), Greg Leisz (dobro), and Jilann O’Neill (backing vocals).

Ammunition was released in 2006. Lucinda Williams and Tift Merritt contributed harmony vocals, and Gary Louris (the Jayhawks) produced three tracks.

2009 saw the release of Porcupine which featured Sam Brown (drums), Matt Surgeson (bass), and Kenny Vaughan (guitar).

Since 1966 was a primarily solo acoustic album released in 2011 and featuring 11 previously unreleased songs.

Also released in 2011, Beat the Band included Aaron Lee Tasjan (guitar and piano), Mark Stepro (drums), and Alex Livingstone (bass).

In 2013, Easton released Not Cool which he began recording after he moved back to Nashville and was inspired by a show at Robert's Western World. He described the album as "kind of a 50s, Sun Studio thing, kind of a rock and roll thing." Not Cool was featured as album of the week on the January 3rd 2022 edition of Belgium's Dr Boogie radio show.

For American Fork, released in 2016, Easton went into the studio with multi-instrumentalist and producer Patrick Damphier, who has worked with Jessica Lea Mayfield and The Mynabirds. The record was almost entirely recorded live with Jon Radford (drums), Michael Rinne (bass), Robbie Crowell (keyboards and horns), Russ Pahl (pedal steel), and Larissa Maestro (cello). Maestro, Megan Palmer, Ariel Bui, and Emma Berkey provided vocal harmonies.

In 2021, Easton released his 10th LP You Don't Really Know Me via new label home Black Mesa Records. The album was produced by Brad Jones and Robin Eaton, who had previously worked with Easton early in his career.

=== Easton Stagger Phillips ===
In 2007, Easton joined Leeroy Stagger and Evan Phillips, performing as Easton, Stagger, Phillips. Easton and Stagger initially performed in 2008 as support acts for Phillips' band The Whipsaws.

The group released One for the Ditch, on Rebeltone Records, in 2008. Their second album Resolution Road was released in 2014.

=== Awards ===
Easton was nominated for the 9th Annual Independent Music Awards Vox Pop award for 'Best Americana Song' with "Burgundy Red".

His album Porcupine won the 9th Annual Independent Music Awards Vox Pop vote for best Album Packaging.

=== Other projects ===
Cold and Bitter Tears: The Songs of Ted Hawkins, released in late 2015 on Austin-based Eight 30 Records, features Easton's recording of Hawkins' song "One Hundred Miles."

== Personal life ==
Easton has one daughter, and lives in Nashville, Tennessee.

== Discography ==
=== Solo studio ===
- 1998: Special 20 (Heathen Records)
- 2001: The Truth About Us (New West)
- 2003: Break Your Mother's Heart (New West)
- 2006: Ammunition (New West)
- 2009: Porcupine (New West)
- 2011: Since 1966, Volume 1 (Campfire Propaganda)
- 2013: Not Cool (Campfire Propaganda)
- 2016: American Fork (Last Chance)
- 2018: Paco & the Melodic Polaroids (Campfire Propaganda)
- 2019: Exposition (Campfire Propaganda)
- 2021: You Don't Really Know Me (Black Mesa Records)
- 2024: Find Your Way (Black Mesa Records)
- 2026: fIREHORSE (Campfire Propaganda)

=== Solo live ===
- 2008: Live at Water Canyon (Sonic Rendezvous)

=== Compilations ===
- 2013: Before the Revolution: The Best of Tim Easton 1998–2011 (New West)

=== With the Freelan Barons ===
- 2011: Beat the Band (Campfire Propaganda)

=== With the Haynes Boys ===
- 1996: Guardian Angel (Slab Recordings)

=== With Easton Stagger Phillips ===
- 2008: One for the Ditch (Blue Rose)
- 2014: Resolution Road (Blue Rose)

=== As guest musician ===
- 2008: Lucinda Williams – Little Honey (Lost Highway)
- 2008: Otis Gibbs – Grandpa Walked a Picketline (Wanamaker / Thirty Tigers)
- 2008: The Whipsaws – 60 Watt Avenue (Blue Rose / Shut Eye)
- 2009: Leeroy Stagger – Everything is Real (Blue Rose / Rebel Tone)
- 2014: Cory Branan – The No-Hit Wonder (Bloodshot)
- 2015: Amy Speace – That Kind Of Girl (Continental Song City)
- 2015: Salto – Salto (self-released)
- 2016: Levi Parham – These American Blues (Music Road)

=== As music contributor ===
- 2009: Various Artists – A Bob Dylan Tribute: So Happy Just To See You Smile (Hanky Panky) – track 9, "Spanish Harlem Incident"
- 2015: Various Artists: Cold And Bitter Tears: The Songs Of Ted Hawkins (Eight 30) – track 3, "One Hundred Miles"
