= Rosie Thomas (singer-songwriter) =

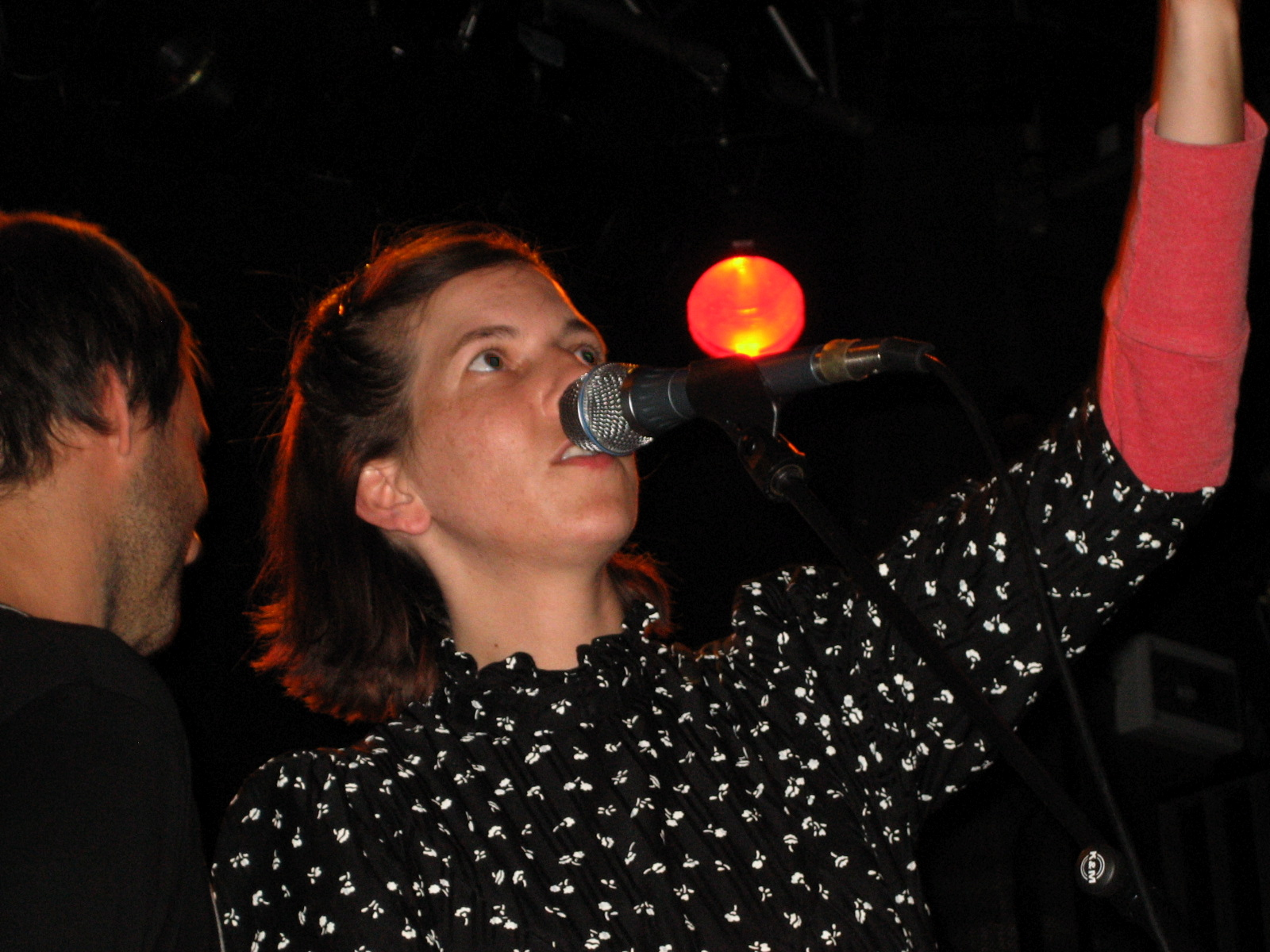
- Rosie Thomas at Roots of Heaven VIII, Patronaat, Haarlem, Netherlands on May 13, 2007

Background information
- Also known as: Sheila Saputo
- Born: c. 1978 (age 47); Livonia, Michigan, U.S.
- Genres: Alternative, indie folk
- Occupation: Musician
- Labels: Sub Pop, Sing-A-Long
- Website: www.rosiethomas.com

Rosie Thomas is an American singer-songwriter and comedian, originally from Michigan.

== Career ==
Raised in Detroit, Michigan, Thomas learned piano and guitar as a child. She attended Calvary Chapel Bible College in Murrieta, California, for a year before studying Theatre at Cornish College of the Arts in Seattle.

Through mutual friends she met Trey Many and began playing shows with Velour 100. They recorded one EP together and played a few short tours, where she met Damien Jurado and David Bazan.

Thomas' appearance on the song "Parking Lot", from Damien Jurado's album Ghost of David, brought her to the attention of Sub Pop Records, who signed her in 2000. Her first recording for the label was a duet with Jurado on "Wages of Sin" on Badlands: A Tribute To Bruce Springsteen's Nebraska. Her debut album When We Were Small was released on January 22, 2002. The album featured Eric Fisher (who Thomas met at Cornish College) on guitar and keyboards and Andy Myers on drums. Fisher and Myers returned for 2003's follow-up, Only with Laughter Can You Win.

Thomas released her third album, If Songs Could Be Held, in 2005. In March 2006, her song "Faith's Silver Elephant" appeared on the Paper Bag Records compilation See You on the Moon! .

In April 2006, Pitchfork erroneously reported that Thomas and American musician Sufjan Stevens were having a baby together, but later published a retraction. Denison Witmer and Thomas later admitted it was an April Fools' prank.

Thomas' album These Friends of Mine was released on December 12, 2006, through her record label Sing-A-Long Records, which also released a holiday album called A Very Rosie Christmas in November 2008. Thomas acted in the 2009 film Calvin Marshall and was the subject of the 2009 documentary All the Way from Michigan Not Mars. She suffered from a thyroid condition that affected her for two years, leading to a gap of four years until her next album With Love (2012). She married folk singer Jeff Shoop in August 2008.

Thomas toured with Sufjan Stevens in his 2012 Surfjohn Stephanopolous Seasonal Affective Disorder Disaster on Ice tour, opening the show as her Sheila Saputo character as well as performing as a member of his band.

=== Comedy ===
Thomas performs as a comedian as the character Sheila Saputo, an accident-prone pizza delivery person. She has performed stand-up as this character as part of her music shows.

== Discography ==
=== Albums ===
- When We Were Small (2001), Sub Pop
- Only with Laughter Can You Win (2003), Sub Pop
- If Songs Could Be Held (2005), Sub Pop
- These Friends of Mine (2006), Sing-A-Long/Nettwerk
- A Very Rosie Christmas (2008)
- All the Way from Michigan Not Mars (2010)
- With Love (2012)

=== EPs ===
- In Between (2001)
- Paper Airplane (2002)
- Lullabies for Parents, Vol. 1 (2022)

=== Singles ===
- "Pretty Dress" (2005)

=== Compilation appearances ===
- "Just a Closer Walk With Thee" – Bifrost Arts' Come O Spirit (Sounds Familyre 2009)
