= Where Was I =

"Where Was I?" may refer to:

== Books ==
- "Where Was I?", essay by David Hawley Sanford from The Mind's I
- Where Was I?, book by John Haycraft 2006
- Where was I?!, book by Terry Wogan 2009

== Film and TV ==
- Where Was I? (film), 1925 film directed by William A. Seiter. With Reginald Denny, Marian Nixon, Pauline Garon, Lee Moran.
- Where Was I? (2001 film), biography about songwriter Tim Rose
- Where Was I? (TV series) 1952–1953 Quiz show with the panelists attempting to guess a location by looking at photos
- "Where Was I?" episode of Shoestring (TV series) 1980

== Music ==
- "Where was I", song by W. Franke Harling and Al Dubin performed by Ruby Newman and His Orchestra with vocal chorus by Larry Taylor and Peggy McCall 1939
- "Where Was I", single from Charley Pride discography 1988
- "Where Was I" (song), a 1994 song by Ricky Van Shelton
- "Where Was I (Donde Estuve Yo)", song by Joe Pass from Simplicity (Joe Pass album)
- "Where Was I?", song by Guttermouth from The Album Formerly Known as a Full Length LP (Guttermouth album)
- "Where Was I", song by Sawyer Brown (Billy Maddox, Paul Thorn, Anne Graham) from Can You Hear Me Now 2002
- "Where Was I?", song by Kenny Wayne Shepherd from Live On 1999
- "Where Was I", song by Melanie Laine (Victoria Banks, Steve Fox) from Time Flies (Melanie Laine album)
- "Where Was I", song by Rosie Thomas from With Love (Rosie Thomas album)
