= Waters Ave S. =

Studio album by Damien Jurado
- Released: January 21, 1997
- Genre: Pop rock
- Label: Sub Pop
- Producer: Damien Jurado; Steve Fisk

Damien Jurado chronology
Waters Ave S. (1997)	Rehearsals for Departure (1999)

Professional ratings
Review scores
Source	Rating
Allmusic	3/5 stars

Waters Ave S. is Damien Jurado's first full-length album, released on Sub Pop Records on January 21, 1997.

The Boston Herald described the songs as "wispy but not wimpy ballads" and compared his work to Neil Young. City Pages argued that "The few strong characters here aren't easy to identify with (one is a purple anteater), but the theremin-addled pop paean "Space Age Mom" suggests Jurado's lyrical strength." AllMusic regarded the album as "an impressive debut that was sadly overlooked by many people".

== Track listing ==
1. "Wedding Cake"
2. "Angel of May"
3. "Treasures of Gold"
4. "Yuma, AZ"
5. "The Joke is Over"
6. "Space Age Mom"
7. "Circus, Circus, Circus"
8. "Hell or Highwater"
9. "Independent"
10. "Purple Anteater"
11. "Sarah"
12. "Halo Friendly"
13. "Waters Ave. S."
