= Robyn O'Neil =

American artist (born 1977)

- Born: 1977 (age 48–49); Omaha, Nebraska, United States
- Education: Werner Herzog's Rogue Film School, Texas A&M University-Commerce, University of Illinois at Chicago, King's College London
- Known for: Drawings
- Spouse: Damien Jurado

Robyn O'Neil (born 1977) is an American artist known for her large-scale graphite on paper drawings. She was also the host of the podcast "ME READING STUFF". In 2023, she temporarily retired from the art world by posting a Kristy McNichol quote on her Instagram account. She launched a new podcast, called ROBYN'S GATE, in early 2024.

== Early life and education ==
Robyn O'Neil was born in Omaha, Nebraska in 1977. She lives and works in Los Angeles, California. She received a Bachelor of Fine Arts from Texas A&M University-Commerce, continuing with studies at the University of Illinois at Chicago, King's College London, and Werner Herzog's Rogue Film School, Los Angeles.

== Professional career and work ==
O’Neil is known for her detailed narrative drawings that often contain art historical references and center on a theme of existential bleakness and absurdity. Traditionally, her monochromatic drawings have depicted "apocalyptic" scenes in which small human figures engage in acts of violence and trauma. Art critic Christopher French has noted of the artist's practice, "Inventing realities rather than describing aspects of nature, O'Neil's dreamlike vistas offer a potent combination of incorporated graphite collage elements so as to inject foreground detail into ambiguous and otherwise largely unmarked middle distances."

Despite the dark nature of her work, positive signs for the future of life and humanity abound. Susan Harris wrote for Art in America that the "[s]oft, velvety passages of shading; painstaking and lovingly articulated rhythms of line; and the implication of the artist's own hand and arm in gestures both small and grand are palpable evocations of the will to make something out of nothing..."

O'Neil has held solo museum exhibitions at the Southeastern Center for Contemporary Art, Winston-Salem; the Des Moines Art Center; the Modern Art Museum of Fort Worth; and the Contemporary Arts Museum, Houston, which traveled to the Herbert F. Johnson Museum of Art at Cornell University, the Frye Art Museum, Seattle. She has participated in group exhibitions at institutions such as the Toledo Museum of Art; the Museum of Fine Arts, Houston; the John Michael Kohler Arts Center, Sheboygan; the Museum of Contemporary Art, Chicago; The Aldrich Contemporary Art Museum; The Kemper Museum, Kansas City; and, the Dallas Museum of Art. Drawings by O'Neil were included in the Whitney Museum of American Art’s 2004 Whitney Biennial. Her work is included in the public collections of the Menil Collection, Houston; Whitney Museum of American Art; Blanton Museum of Art; Dallas Museum of Art; John Michael Kohler Arts Center; The Kemper Museum; Modern Art Museum of Fort Worth; Museum of Fine Arts, Houston; Pennsylvania Academy of Fine Arts; Sheldon Museum of Art, Omaha; Des Moines Art Center; Ulrich Museum of Art, Wichita; and, the Art Gallery of Western Australia, Perth.

In 2010, O'Neil received a FRAMEWORKS Grant from the Irish Film Board for a film written and directed by her titled “WE, THE MASSES,” which was conceived at Werner Herzog’s Rogue Film School. O'Neil is the recipient of numerous grants and awards, including the Joan Mitchell Foundation Grant, an Artadia grant, and the Huntington Prize. She was featured alongside author John Green on PBS Digital Studios' The Art Assignment in 2014. A recent monograph of her work, Robyn O’Neil: 20 Years of Drawings, was published by Archon Projects in 2017.

In 2016, O'Neil directed a community collaborative drawing project with Harvester Arts in Wichita, KS. The project, The Great Kansas Sea, was inspired by the Permian Sea that covered Kansas 250 million years ago. The massive seascape was created by 700 drawings submitted by 500 participants.
