= If Songs Could Be Held =

Studio album by Rosie Thomas
- Released: September 13, 2005
- Genres: Alternative, indie folk
- Length: 39:35
- Label: Sub Pop
- Producer: Busbee

Rosie Thomas chronology
Only with Laughter Can You Win (2003)	If Songs Could Be Held (2005)	These Friends of Mine (2006)

If Songs Could Be Held is the third album by American singer/songwriter Rosie Thomas, released in 2005.

Produced by Busbee, the album features a duet with Ed Harcourt on "Let It Be Me". The album also features Liz Phair, Dino Meneghin, and Josh Myers.

== Reception ==
Professional ratings
Aggregate scores
Source	Rating
Metacritic	62/100
Review scores
Source	Rating
AllMusic	3.5/5 stars
Glide	favorable
Paste	favorable
Pitchfork Media	5.9/10
Punknews.org	3/5 stars
PopMatters	6/10 stars
Prefix	3/10 stars
The Stranger	favorable
Tiny Mix Tapes	3/5 marks

AllMusic gave the album three and a half stars out of five, with James Christopher Monger calling it "a lovely collection of Sunday morning melancholy that's as gentle as it is weary" and "the most accessible record ever to bear the SubPop insignia". Paste, tinymixtapes, and Punknews.org gave it similar ratings. Pitchfork Media gave it a 5.9 out of 10 rating. PopMatters gave it 6/10, with David Bernard saying it "sounds amazing".

Prefix writer John Zeiss was less complementary, giving the album 3/10 and calling "a letdown".

== Track listing ==
All songs written by Rosie Thomas unless otherwise stated. All songs arranged by Rosie Thomas and busbee.

1. "Since You've Been Around" – 3:18
2. "Pretty Dress" (Thomas/busbee) – 3:56
3. "Loose Ends" – 3:41
4. "It Don't Matter to the Sun" (Gordon Kennedy, Wayne Kirkpatrick, Tommy Sims) – 3:40
5. "Guess It May" (Thomas/busbee) – 4:11
6. "Let It Be Me" (Gilbert Bécaud, Pierre Leroyer) – 3:40
7. "Clear as a Bell" – 3:27
8. "Say What You Want" (Thomas/busbee) – 3:44
9. "Time Goes Away" (Thomas/busbee) – 3:44
10. "Death Came and Got Me" – 2:50
11. "Tomorrow" (Thomas/busbee) – 3:19
