= Maraqopa =

Studio album by Damien Jurado
- Released: February 21, 2012
- Genres: Folk rock, indie folk
- Length: 36:12
- Label: Secretly Canadian
- Producer: Richard Swift

Damien Jurado chronology
Saint Bartlett (2010)	Maraqopa (2012)	Brothers and Sisters of the Eternal Son (2014)

Maraqopa is the tenth studio album by American rock musician Damien Jurado, produced by Richard Swift. It was released on February 21, 2012, on Secretly Canadian.

The story follows a man who disappears from society. He takes nothing with him except a couple hundred dollars and stumbles upon a mysterious place called Maraqopa. "He's discovering a lot of interesting things about who he is," Jurado explains. "He ends up leaving Maraqopa after a while, and then he gets into a car accident."

== Track listing ==
No.	Title	Length
1.	"Nothing Is the News"	5:34
2.	"Life Away from the Garden"	2:51
3.	"Maraqopa"	3:41
4.	"This Time Next Year"	3:59
5.	"Reel to Reel"	4:31
6.	"Working Titles"	3:44
7.	"Everyone a Star"	4:21
8.	"So On, Nevada"	2:31
9.	"Museum of Flight"	2:49
10.	"Mountains Still Asleep"	2:18

Professional ratings
Aggregate scores
Source	Rating
Metacritic	81/100
Review scores
Source	Rating
AllMusic	4/5 stars
Alternative Press	4/5 stars
The A.V. Club	A−
Consequence of Sound	3.5/5 stars
Mojo	4/5 stars
musicOMH	4/5 stars
Paste	8.0/10
Pitchfork	7.6/10
Tiny Mix Tapes	4/5 stars
Uncut	8/10
