= The Generals of the Daughters of the American Revolution =

1963 photograph by Richard Avedon

- Artist: Richard Avedon
- Year: 1963 (63 years ago)
- Medium: Gelatin silver print
- Subject: Daughters of the American Revolution
- Dimensions: 121 cm × 150 cm (47.5 in × 59 in)

The Generals of the Daughters of the American Revolution, DAR Convention, Mayflower Hotel, Washington, DC, October 15, 1963 is a photograph on gelatin silver print by American photographer Richard Avedon. It is on display at the Smithsonian Institution's National Museum of American History.

== Photograph ==
On October 15, 1963, Richard Avedon photographed a group of executive officers of the Daughters of the American Revolution during their convention at the Mayflower Hotel in Washington, D.C. His picture shows the women preparing to sit for an official portrait. The art curator and writer Hilton Als described the portrayal of the women as "self-important" with "a smug self-regard", while pointing out that one of the most prominent focal points in the photograph is the "wide backside" of a woman, President General Marion Moncure Duncan, who stands facing her colleagues with her back turned to the viewer. The work was printed on gelatin silver.

The portrait is a part of the Smithsonian Institution's collection on display at the National Museum of American History in Washington, D.C. It was given as a gift to the museum by Michael Abrams and Sandra Stewart.

In 1964, the portrait was included in Nothing Personal, a collection of Avendon's photographs published with an essay by James Baldwin. It was reissued in 2017 with a second volume of photographs, including an outtake from his photoshoot with the Daughters of the American Revolution that showed the women smiling.

A print of the photograph hangs at the Black Forest Inn in Minneapolis. On November 11, 1986, an unemployed security guard and Vietnam War veteran named Ellis Nelson walked into the inn and shot the picture with a revolver that he had stashed in his coat pocket. Two figures in the photograph were pierced by bullets. After shooting the photograph, Nelson surrendered to police and was arrested. He was reported to have said, "That photo always bugged the hell out of me" when questioned about his motive. Erich Christ, the owner of the Black Forest Inn, decided not to repair the work, claiming that it had become a popular tourist attraction. Visitors to the inn reportedly stick their fingers into the bullet holes and take pictures.

== Cultural influence ==
In 2012, the American indie pop band The Mynabirds released their second album Generals, inspired by Avedon's portrait. The album cover, shot by DP Muller, was also inspired by the photograph. The band's singer-songwriter, Laura Burhenn, said that Avedon's original photograph was a representation of "the spirit of righteous battle transformed over the centuries into a mirror of the lineage-based aristocracy the founding American patriots were escaping."

== See also ==
- Daughters of Revolution
