= What's New, Tomboy? =

What's New, Tomboy

Studio album by Damien Jurado
- Released: May 1, 2020
- Length: 29:30
- Label: Mama Bird

Damien Jurado chronology
In the Shape of a Storm (2019)	What's New, Tomboy (2020)

Professional ratings
Aggregate scores
Source	Rating
AnyDecentMusic?	7.2/10
Metacritic	78/100
Review scores
Source	Rating
AllMusic	3.5/5 stars
American Songwriter	4/5 stars
Beats Per Minute	66%
Exclaim!	8/10
MusicOMH	4.5/5 stars
Pitchfork	7.3/10

What's New, Tomboy is a studio album by American singer-songwriter Damien Jurado. It was released on May 1, 2020, under Mama Bird Recording Co.

== Critical reception ==
What's New, Tomboy was met with generally favorable reviews from critics. At Metacritic, which assigns a weighted average rating out of 100 to reviews from mainstream publications, this release received an average score of 78, based on 13 reviews.

== Track listing ==
All tracks are written by Damien Jurado.

What's New, Tomboy track listing
No.	Title	Length
1.	"Birds Tricked into the Trees"	2:14
2.	"Ochoa"	3:10
3.	"Alice Hyatt"	2:42
4.	"Arthur Aware"	3:23
5.	"Francine"	2:30
6.	"Fool Maria"	4:14
7.	"When You Were Few"	2:42
8.	"Sandra"	2:42
9.	"The End of the Road"	3:07
10.	"Frankie"	2:46
