= I Break Chairs =

Studio album by Damien Jurado
- Released: February 19, 2002
- Label: Sub Pop
- Producer: David Bazan

Damien Jurado chronology
Ghost of David (2000)	I Break Chairs (2002)	Where Shall You Take Me? (2003)

I Break Chairs is Damien Jurado's fourth album, and first with his backing band, Gathered in Song. The album was produced by the lead singer of Pedro the Lion and Headphones, David Bazan.

== Track listing ==
All songs written by Damien Jurado, except Air Show Disaster written by Josh Golden.

1. "Paperwings" – 2:55
2. "Dancing" – 4:02
3. "Birdcage" – 2:13
4. "Inevitable" – 2:11
5. "Air Show Disaster" – 2:24
6. "Never Ending Tide" – 4:44
7. "Big Deal" – 2:23
8. "The Way You Look" – 3:12
9. "Castles" – 2:25
10. "Like Titanic" – 3:26
11. "Parade" – 2:34
12. "Lose My Head" – 5:21

== Personnel ==
- Damien Jurado – guitar, vocals
- Eric Fisher – guitar, glockenspiel, keyboards
- Andrew Myers – drums, glockenspiel
- Josh Golden - Bass, Guitar, Vocals
- David Bazan – producer, engineer, mixing
- Jesse LeDoux – design
- Aaron Sprinkle – mixing
- Rick Fisher – mastering

== Reception ==
Professional ratings
Review scores
Source	Rating
Allmusic	4.5/5 stars
Pitchfork	(7.1/10)
Stylus	(B+)
The Great Indie Discography	6/10 stars

Heather Phares of Allmusic writes that I Break Chairs "proves that [Damien Jurado] can rock with the best" and the music is "emotionally deep as it is musically diverse". Andy Cockle of Dusted writes that Jurado "displays his golden throat, though the setting seems a bit different" and that the addition of his backing band, Gathered in Song, "allows Jurado to create hopeful pop after providing us with several albums of harrowing solitude". Brad Haywood of Pitchfork Media laments "Jurado's prior three releases was honest, introspective, moody, sometimes peppy and sometimes heartbreaking. The new Jurado is none of those things" and "a return to normalcy would be welcome". Colleen Delaney of Stylus writes "it's too hard to compare I Break Chairs to anything because it's got that sort of timeless quality to it" and "it's bringing me back to the salad days [of indie pop] of 1992, 1993".
