= When We Were Small =

Studio album by Rosie Thomas
- Released: January 22, 2002
- Recorded: Jupiter Studios, Seattle, May 2001
- Genre: Indie folk
- Length: 36:46
- Label: Sub Pop
- Producer: Martin Feveyear

Rosie Thomas chronology
In Between EP (2001)	When We Were Small (2002)	Only with Laughter Can You Win (2003)

When We Were Small is the debut album by American singer-songwriter Rosie Thomas, released in 2002.

== Reception ==
Professional ratings
Review scores
Source	Rating
Allmusic	4/5 stars
Metro Times	4/5 stars
Pitchfork Media	7.3/10

Pitchfork Media rated the album 7.3 out of 10, with reviewer Brad Haywood calling it "a solid debut, long on talent but maybe a bit short on melody or lacking in appropriate production". Allmusic awarded it four stars, with Tom Semioli calling it a "mesmerizing debut outing". Indy Week described it as "a quiet collection of songs that tend to spotlight the lyrics, and in Thomas' case, that's definitely a plus". Geoffrey Himes, writing for the Washington Post, commented on Thomas's "frail, breathy soprano that offers reluctant confessions over minimalist keyboard settings".

== Track listing ==
All songs written by Rosie Thomas.

1. "2 Dollar Shoes" – 3:10
2. "Farewell" – 3:12
3. "Wedding Day" – 5:26
4. "Lorraine" – 3:24
5. "Finish Line" – 2:40
6. "October" – 2:21
7. "I Run" – 4:07
8. "Charlotte" – 3:19
9. "Have You Seen My Love?" – 2:56
10. "Bicycle Tricycle" – 6:04
