= Leeroy Stagger =

Canadian musician

- Born: Lee John Thomas Starck
- Origin: Victoria, British Columbia, Canada
- Genres: Alternative country Rock
- Occupation: singer/songwriter
- Years active: 1998–present
- Label: True North
- Website: leeroystagger.com

Lee John Thomas Starck, better known by his stage name Leeroy Stagger, is a Canadian alternative country singer-songwriter based in Victoria, British Columbia. He has released a number of albums of his own music, produced albums for several other musicians including Mariel Buckley, Tim Easton, Dennis Ellsworth and has toured around North America and Europe with Artists such as Steve Earle, Josh Ritter, Buffy Sainte Marie and Frazey Ford, The Pixies, Modest Mouse and Evan Dando, and has collaborated with Danny Michel.

He was signed with industry mogul Danny Goldberg's label Gold Lake for two albums before signing with Canadian label True North Records joining a celebrated roster with the likes of Bruce Cockburn and more.

== Early life ==
Stagger was born in Victoria, British Columbia and grew up in rural British Columbia.

== Career ==
Stagger performed in several local Punk Bands. In 2002 he accompanied Hot Hot Heat on a Canadian tour. Reinventing himself as a singer-songwriter, he released his debut independent EP, Six Tales of Danger, in 2002.

He spent 15 years in Lethbridge, Alberta but moved back with his family to his hometown of Victoria in 2020.

In 2015 Stagger won the top prize at the Alberta Peak Performance Project competition, and used the money to develop a home studio in Lethbridge. He produced a 2017 album, Sleeping Buffalo, for The Wardens.

Leeroy Stagger's 11th studio recording, Love Versus, was released 7 April 2017, through True North. The album was produced by Colin Stewart (Dan Mangan, Black Mountain, Yukon Blonde), and includes performances from drummer Pete Thomas (Elvis Costello), guitarist Paul Rigby (Neko Case), keyboardist Geoff Hilhorst (the Deep Dark Woods), and Stagger's longtime bassist Tyson Maiko.

The first single from Love Versus, was "I Want It All", a meditation on being grateful for what one has. Stagger continued touring and performing songs from this album in 2018.

In 2019 Stagger released the album Strange Path, which included a song acknowledging the influence of Gord Downie. He headed out on a North American tour in support of the album.

== Personal life ==
Leeroy is married to longtime Partner, designer Coby Starck, They have two children together.

== Discography ==
=== Albums ===
- Dear Love (2004)
- Beautiful House (2005)
- Depression River (2006)
- Everything Is Real (2009)
- Little Victories (2010)
- Radiant Land (2012)
- Truth be Sold (2013)
- Dream It All Away (2015)
- Love Versus (2017)
- Me and the Mountain (2019)
- Strange Path (2019)
- Dystopian Weekends (2021)

=== EPs ===
- Six Tales of Danger (2002)
- Tales from the Back Porch (2006)

=== Live ===
- Live at the Red River Saloon (2010)

== See also ==
- Canadian rock
- List of Canadian musicians
- Music of Canada
