= Where Shall You Take Me? =

Studio album by Damien Jurado
- Released: March 4, 2003
- Genre: Indie rock
- Label: Secretly Canadian
- Producer: Eric Fisher

Damien Jurado chronology
I Break Chairs (2002)	Where Shall You Take Me? (2003)	On My Way to Absence (2005)

Professional ratings
Aggregate scores
Source	Rating
Metacritic	88/100
Review scores
Source	Rating
AllMusic	3.5/5 stars
Alternative Press	5/5
The Boston Phoenix	3/4 stars
Mojo	5/5 stars
Now	4/5
Pitchfork	7.2/10
Uncut	4/5 stars

Where Shall You Take Me? is the fifth studio album by American indie rock musician Damien Jurado. It was released on March 18, 2003, and was produced by Eric Fisher. Damien Jurado provided the vocals and guitar, Eric Fisher provided the guitar and keyboard and Andy Myers provided the percussion and background vocals.

The songs "Abilene" and "Sucker" were used in television series One Tree Hill.

== Track listing ==
All songs written by Damien Jurado.

1. "Amateur Night" – 3:12
2. "Omaha" – 3:18
3. "Abilene" – 2:26
4. "Texas To Ohio" – 2:56
5. "Window" – 2:21
6. "I Can't Get Over You" – 3:11
7. "Intoxicated Hands" – 4:35
8. "Tether" – 2:34
9. "Matinee" – 2:58
10. "Bad Dreams" – 4:06
