= What We Lose in the Fire We Gain in the Flood =

Studio album by The Mynabirds
- Released: April 27, 2010
- Recorded: Mid-2009
- Genre: Alternative country, blue-eyed soul
- Length: 31:17
- Label: Saddle Creek Records
- Producer: Richard Swift

The Mynabirds chronology
What We Lose in the Fire We Gain in the Flood (2010)	Generals (2012)

What We Lose in the Fire We Gain in the Flood is the first studio album by the indie pop band The Mynabirds. It was released by Saddle Creek Records on April 27, 2010 and produced by Richard Swift.

== Track listing ==
All songs written by Laura Burhenn.

No.	Title	Length
1.	"What We Gained in the Fire"	4:48
2.	"Let the Record Go"	2:22
3.	"Numbers Don't Lie"	3:31
4.	"Give It Time"	3:54
5.	"Ways of Looking"	3:23
6.	"LA Rain"	2:47
7.	"Wash It Out"	2:05
8.	"We Made a Mountain"	3:09
9.	"Right Place"	3:36
10.	"Good Heart"	3:02

== Reception ==
Professional ratings
Aggregate scores
Source	Rating
Metacritic	77/100
Review scores
Source	Rating
AllMusic	4/5 stars
Drowned in Sound	(8/10)
NME	4/5 stars
Pitchfork Media	(8/10)
PopMatters	(9/10)
Under the Radar	6/10 stars

On Metacritic, What We Lose in the Fire We Gain in the Flood has an average score of 77 out of 100, indicating "generally favorable reviews".

James Skinner, writing for Drowned in Sound, praised both Burhenn's vocals and Swift's production, stating that the album "revels in a soulful, brassy buzz that sounds great from the offset and even better on further listening". In a positive review for Pitchfork, Matthew Perpetua favourably compares the album to Burhenn's earlier work with Georgie James, saying "Here, she emerges fully formed with a set of bold, assured songs so elegantly composed that many could pass for old standards". According to Anthony Lombardi of PopMatters, "With such a crowded, convoluted number of artists arriving on the indie scene [...] it's both exciting and comforting to find a talent as raw and solitary as Laura Burhenn's", with this album being "a pure, big-hearted document of strength and spirit that's as affecting and enlivening as anything pop music's past has given us".
