= Generals (album) =

Studio album by The Mynabirds
- Released: June 5, 2012
- Recorded: Winter 2011–2012
- Genres: Indie pop, indie rock
- Length: 36:07
- Label: Saddle Creek Records
- Producer: Richard Swift

The Mynabirds chronology
What We Lose in the Fire We Gain in the Flood (2010)	Generals (2012)

Generals is the second studio album by the indie pop band The Mynabirds. It was released by Saddle Creek Records on June 5, 2012, and produced by Richard Swift. The album's title was inspired by Richard Avedon's photograph The Generals of the Daughters of the American Revolution.

== Track listing ==
All songs written by Laura Burhenn, except where noted.

No.	Title	Writer(s)	Length
1.	"Karma Debt"		3:11
2.	"Wolf Mother"		3:14
3.	"Generals"		3:43
4.	"Radiator Sister"		3:13
5.	"Disaster"	Burhenn, Richard Swift	3:16
6.	"Mightier Than The Sword"		5:08
7.	"Body Of Work"		3:00
8.	"Disarm"		4:05
9.	"Buffalo Flower"		3:37
10.	"Greatest Revenge"		4:20

== Reception ==
Professional ratings
Aggregate scores
Source	Rating
Metacritic	79/100
Review scores
Source	Rating
AllMusic	(8/10)
CMJ	(8/10)
Paste	(8.5/10)
Pitchfork	(7.5/10)
Consequence of Sound	(7.0/10)

On Metacritic, Generals has an average score of 79 out of 100, indicating "generally favorable reviews".

Eric Harvey, writing for Pitchfork, praised the album as "a stylistically diverse collection of openhearted, politically engaged pop", adding that Burhenn succeeds in "translating [her] deeply held political conventions into good tunes". In a similarly positive review for Consequence of Sound, Tony Hardy also comments on the political nature of the lyrics, stating that Burhenn "juxtaposes the privileged, regal ladies of Avedon’s portrait with those she considers to be true daughters of the revolution, the likes, say, of Rosa Parks or Naomi Wolf." Drake Baer of Paste described Generals as "[Burhenn's] militant, heartfelt, frustrated pacifism [...] set into pop convention".
