= These Friends of Mine (album) =

Studio album by Rosie Thomas
- Released: December 12, 2006
- Recorded: 2006
- Genre: Indie folk
- Length: 39:35
- Labels: Sing-A-Long, Nettwerk
- Producer: Josh Myers

Rosie Thomas chronology
If Songs Could Be Held (2005)	These Friends of Mine (2006)	A Very Rosie Christmas (2008)

These Friends of Mine is the fourth album by American singer-songwriter Rosie Thomas, released in 2006. Jeremy Enigk, Sufjan Stevens (who also co-produced), David Bazan, Damien Jurado, and Denison Witmer also appear on this album. The album was initially only available for purchase at online music stores. On March 13, 2007 it was released on compact disc.

The album was recorded over a two-year period in a Brooklyn apartment that Thomas shared with Stevens and Witmer, and includes cover versions of R.E.M.'s "The One I Love" and Fleetwood Mac's "Songbird".

== Reception ==
The BBC called it a "whimsical, stripped down album", "an album that brims with introspective beauty and exposes Thomas’ song writing ability". Allmusic gave the album a three and a half out of five rating, calling it "a mixed bag, a long EP that works great when the song choice and left-of-center recording techniques meld into one, and lackluster when they do not". PopMatters gave the album 7 out of 10, with reviewer Andrew Vietze describing the songs as "heartbreakingly beautiful and they seem painfully authentic", and calling it "arguably the best Rosie Thomas record so far". The Boston Globe gave it a favorable review, stating "If folky girls hit your heartstrings, Thomas's work is a perfect soundtrack to coffee-shop dreaming and scribbling." The Washington Post called it "an album of quiet, folksy ballads". The Sunday Mercury described it as "a delightfully home-spun affair", calling it "an album not just to love but to treasure". Liz Colville, reviewing the album for Pitchfork Media gave it 3.8 out of 10, calling it "a sleepy, easy folk album". The Manchester Evening News called it "an album full of serenity and dreaminess".

== Track listing ==
1. "If This City Never Sleeps" – 1:57
2. "Why Waste More Time?" – 3:46
3. "The One I Love" (Bill Berry, Peter Buck, Mike Mills, Michael Stipe) – 2:54 (originally by R.E.M.)
4. "Much Farther to Go" – 4:18
5. "Paper Doll" – 3:50 (originally by Denison Witmer)
6. "Kite Song" – 2:52
7. "Songbird" (Christine McVie) – 3:10 (originally by Fleetwood Mac)
8. "All the Way to New York City" – 2:40
9. "Say Hello" – 2:19 (featuring Sufjan Stevens)
10. "These Friends of Mine" – 5:02
