= Patrick Damphier =

American musician

- At Zanzabar in Louisville, November 2017

Background information
- Born: Patrick Kane Damphier; Amsterdam, New York
- Genres: Indie rock; Indie pop; Indie folk
- Instruments: Vocals; drums; keyboards; bass guitar; guitar
- Years active: 2007–present
- Label: YK Records
- Website: www.patrickdamphier.com

Patrick Damphier is an American singer-songwriter, multi-instrumentalist and record producer. Damphier has also toured as a member of The Mynabirds, Lionlimb, Paper Rival, Stone Jack Jones and Jessica Lea Mayfield. He has worked as a record producer for such acts as The Mynabirds, Aaron Lee Tasjan, Thayer Sarrano, Tim Easton, The Arcs, Paper Rival, Photo Ops, Houndmouth, Fences, Jessica Lea Mayfield, Mikaela Davis and Night Beds. Damphier is known to often provide substantial contributions as a multi-instrumentalist to the albums he produces. He has co-written with and/or had songs recorded by The Mynabirds, Paper Rival, Photo Ops, Jillette Johnson, Jessica Lea Mayfield, Aaron Lee Tasjan, Seratones, Johanna Samuels, Lola Kirke, Andrew Combs, Greta Morgan, Oh Mercy, Aaron Espe, Dylan LeBlanc, Lydia Luce, Fences, Judy Blank, Mikaela Davis, Laura Burhenn, and Sun Seeker.

Damphier was a member of The Mynabirds with Laura Burhenn touring with the band until 2017. Damphier produced their 2017 release Be Here Now and co-wrote many of the songs.

== Discography ==
=== Solo ===
- Projector (as Field Days) (2011)
- Say I'm Pretty (2018)

=== The Mynabirds ===
- Be Here Now (2017)
