= Paper Rival =

Indie rock band from Tennessee

- Origin: Nashville, Tennessee
- Genres: indie rock
- Years active: 2005–2008
- Members: Jake Rolleston - vocalist Patrick Damphier - guitarist, drums Brent Coleman - guitarist Cody McCall - bass guitarist
- Website: Paper Rival's MySpace page

Paper Rival was an indie rock band formed in late 2005 from Nashville, Tennessee. Originally known as Keating, the band changed its name to Paper Rival in 2007 after a tour of Canada where the band was mistaken for a Canadian band who already possessed the name. In December 2007, Paper Rival was named Spin.com's "Artist of the Day". The band released its debut full-length album produced by Patrick Damphier, Dialog on May 20, 2008. The group cited artists Blind Lemon Jefferson, Merle Haggard and Bruce Cockburn (whose song "Pacing the Cage" was covered on their 2007 self-titled EP) as musical inspirations.

== Music ==
The band's songs are originally written acoustically with overdubs and extras added in afterwards.

As the band developed and evolved, the music took on an alternative, indie rock sound with hints of old country and blues intertwined.

Paper Rival appeared on Q101, Chicago's alternative rock radio station, in December 2007 to promote Dialog. The band performed acoustic versions of songs from the album.

The band also took part in South By Southwest (SXSW) 2006, 2007, and 2008 in Austin, Texas.

In a November 20, 2008 blog post on the band's MySpace page, the band announced that singer Jake Rolleston be returning to school to pursue further studies, thus signaling the band's breakup.

== Lineup ==
- Jake Rolleston: vocals, guitar
- Patrick Damphier: guitar, drums
- Brent Coleman: guitar
- Cody McCall: bass guitar

== Discography ==
=== Singles ===
- "Cassandra"

=== EPs ===
- Thieves (2007)
- Paper Rival (2007)

=== Albums ===
- Dialog (2008)
