= Ghost of David =

Studio album by Damien Jurado
- Released: September 19, 2000
- Genre: Indie rock
- Length: 43:55
- Label: Sub Pop

Damien Jurado chronology
Rehearsals for Departure (1999)	Ghost of David (2000)	I Break Chairs (2002)

Professional ratings
Review scores
Source	Rating
AllMusic	4/5 stars
Pitchfork	8.2/10

Ghost of David is an album by the singer-songwriter Damien Jurado, released in 2000 on Sub Pop.

The title comes from a dream Jurado had in which his friend and former bandmate David Bazan had died.

== Critical reception ==
AllMusic wrote: "Another strong collection of urban folk songs from Damien Jurado, Ghost of David builds on the gentle, friendly loneliness of Rehearsals for Departure and deepens it with a spiritual, often otherworldly feel." No Depression wrote that "'Ghost In The Snow' and 'Paxil' see Jurado at his best, music and meaning waltzing with each other in a death march that is fascinating to behold." Trouser Press called Ghost of David "a powerful, haunting album that should be kept far, far away from depressives." SF Weekly called it "a gracefully stripped-down mix of personality and invention, a record in the powerful, simple vein of Bruce Springsteen's Nebraska."

== Track listing ==
1. "Medication" – 4:34
2. "Desert" – 2:57
3. "Johnny Go Riding" – 3:42
4. "Great Today" – 2:58
5. "Tonight I Will Retire" – 5:09
6. "Ghost of David" – 2:34
7. "Parking Lot" – 4:00
8. "Rearview" – 2:05
9. "Paxil" – 2:16
10. "Walk with Me" – 3:16
11. "December" – 4:19
12. "Rosewood Casket" – 2:58
13. "Ghost in the Snow" – 3:07
