= Brothers and Sisters of the Eternal Son =

Studio album by Damien Jurado
- Released: January 21, 2014
- Studio: National Freedom Studios, Cottage Grove, Oregon, US.
- Genre: Folk rock, indie folk
- Length: 34:46
- Label: Secretly Canadian
- Producer: Richard Swift

Damien Jurado chronology
Maraqopa (2012)	Brothers and Sisters of the Eternal Son (2014)	Visions of Us on the Land (2016)

Professional ratings
Aggregate scores
Source	Rating
Metacritic	79/100
Review scores
Source	Rating
AllMusic	4/5 stars

Brothers and Sisters of the Eternal Son is the eleventh studio album by American rock musician Damien Jurado. It was released January 21, 2014, by Secretly Canadian. The album was announced in the middle of October with a short trailer and an essay by Father John Misty. Jurado described the album as "sort of a sequel to Maraqopa... it is about a guy who disappears on a search, if you will, for himself and never goes home".

The album cover art features a manipulated photo of one of the three glass domes at the Mitchell Park Horticultural Conservatory in Milwaukee, WI.

== Track listing ==
All tracks are written by Damien Jurado.

No.	Title	Length
1.	"Magic Number"	3:10
2.	"Silver Timothy"	3:18
3.	"Return to Maraqopa"	2:50
4.	"Metallic Cloud"	3:27
5.	"Jericho Road"	3:42
6.	"Silver Donna"	6:08
7.	"Silver Malcolm"	3:23
8.	"Silver Katherine"	3:27
9.	"Silver Joy"	3:09
10.	"Suns in Our Mind"	2:12
