= Saint Bartlett =

Studio album by Damien Jurado
- Released: 25 May 2010
- Genre: Indie rock
- Label: Secretly Canadian
- Producer: Richard Swift

Damien Jurado chronology
Caught in the Trees (2008)	Saint Bartlett (2010)	Maraqopa (2012)

Professional ratings
Aggregate scores
Source	Rating
Metacritic	77/100
Review scores
Source	Rating
AllMusic	4/5 stars
BBC	Favorable
Drowned in Sound	6/10
musicOMH	4/5 stars
Pitchfork Media	7.9/10
PopMatters	7.0/10

Saint Bartlett is Damien Jurado's ninth studio album. It was released in May 2010 by Secretly Canadian.

== Track listing ==
1. "Cloudy Shoes"
2. "Arkansas"
3. "Rachel & Cali"
4. "Throwing Your Voice"
5. "Wallingford"
6. "Pear"
7. "Kansas City"
8. "Harborview"
9. "Kalama"
10. "The Falling Snow"
11. "Beacon Hill"
12. "With Lightning In Your Hands"

== Our Turn to Shine ==
Some Independent Music stores in the USA and UK and Amazon UK sold the album with a 5-track bonus EP called Our Turn to Shine.

1. "Josephine"
2. "Everyone a Star"
3. "Three to Be Seen"
4. "Wyoming Birds"
5. "You for a While"
