= Visions of Us on the Land =

Studio album by Damien Jurado
- Released: March 18, 2016
- Studio: National Freedom Studios, Cottage Grove, Oregon, US
- Genre: Psychedelic folk, folk rock, indie folk
- Length: 52:02
- Label: Secretly Canadian
- Producer: Richard Swift

Damien Jurado chronology
Brothers and Sisters of the Eternal Son (2014)	Visions of Us on the Land (2016)

Visions of Us on the Land is the twelfth studio album by American rock musician Damien Jurado. It was released on March 18, 2016, by Secretly Canadian. The album was announced on December 15, 2015 with the release of its first single, "Exit 353". The album marks the end of a trilogy of albums produced by Richard Swift.

== Accolades ==
Publication	Accolade	Year	Rank
Rough Trade	Albums of the Year	2016	69

== Track listing ==
All tracks are written by Damien Jurado

No.	Title	Length
1.	"November 20"	2:01
2.	"Mellow Blue Polka Dot"	3:28
3.	"QACHINA"	3:48
4.	"Lon Bella"	3:12
5.	"Sam and Davy"	3:32
6.	"Prisms"	2:19
7.	"ONALASKA"	3:35
8.	"TAQOMA"	3:41
9.	"On the Land Blues"	2:47
10.	"Walrus"	3:13
11.	"Exit 353"	3:14
12.	"Cinco de Tomorrow"	3:27
13.	"And Loraine"	2:35
14.	"A.M. AM"	3:17
15.	"Queen Anne"	2:21
16.	"Orphans in the Key of E"	3:04
17.	"Kola"	2:35
