= With Love (Rosie Thomas album) =

Studio album by Rosie Thomas
- Released: February 14, 2012
- Recorded: 2011
- Genre: Indie folk
- Length: 34:33
- Label: Sing-A-Long
- Producers: Black Wescott, David Bazan

Rosie Thomas chronology
A Very Rosie Christmas (2008)	With Love (2012)

With Love is the sixth studio album by American singer-songwriter Rosie Thomas, released on February 14, 2012. It was Thomas's first album in four years, having taken time out due to a thyroid disorder and anxiety, getting married, and touring with Iron & Wine.

Thomas worked on the album with Sufjan Stevens' band, Sam Beam (Iron & Wine), and David Bazan (Pedro the Lion).

In commemoration of its tenth anniversary, the album was re-released digitally on July 29, 2022 with two bonus tracks, a full band recording of "Sometimes Love" and "Sweet as an Apple Tree".

== Reception ==
Professional ratings
Aggregate scores
Source	Rating
Metacritic	67/100
Review scores
Source	Rating
AllMusic	3.5/5 stars
The New York Times	mixed
Paste	5.5
PopMatters	Positive

Allmusic gave the album three stars, with John O'Brien saying that is "plenty to enjoy here". PopMatters gave it 7/10, with Philip Majorins calling it "a charming and unexpected salute to the female pop vocalists of Rosie's youth" and "a risky, yet utterly sincere, retro-pop gem". Nate Chinen, reviewing the album for The New York Times noted that Thomas's "singing is bolder and more outgoing than on her previous albums". The Washington Post's Mike Joyce commented favorably on Thomas's voice but was less impressed with some of the lyrics, stating "You can't knock Thomas's attitude and sincerity any more than you can fault her vocal charms and the album's smart production." Ryan Reed, reviewing the album for Paste, gave the album 5.5 out of 10, finding fault in both the lyrics and the music.

== Track listing ==
1. "Where Was I" – 3:43
2. "Over the Moon" – 3:18
3. "In Time" – 3:57
4. "Like Wildflowers" – 2:47
5. "Two Worlds Collide" – 3:43
6. "2 Birds" – 3:11
7. "Is This Love" – 2:41
8. "Back to Being Friends" – 3:56
9. "Really Long Year" – 3:01
10. "Sometimes Love" – 4:03

10th anniversary edition bonus tracks

1. "Sometimes Love (The Band version)" – 3:58
2. "Sweet as an Apple Tree" – 2:20
