= Rehearsals for Departure =

Studio album by Damien Jurado
- Released: March 1999
- Studio: Robert Lang (Shoreline, Washington)
- Genre: Indie folk
- Label: Sub Pop
- Producers: Ken Stringfellow, Blake Wescott

Damien Jurado chronology
Waters Ave S (1997)	Rehearsals for Departure (1999)	Ghost of David (2000)

Professional ratings
Review scores
Source	Rating
AllMusic	4.5/5 stars
Pitchfork Media	8.2/10
The Times	7/10

Rehearsals for Departure is the second album by Damien Jurado, released in 1999 on Sub Pop.

== Production ==
The album was produced by Ken Stringfellow and Blake Wescott.

== Critical reception ==
Joe Heim of Salon gave the album a very favorable review, praising its melancholy themes. The Times Colonist called the album "utterly sublime," writing that Jurado "doesn't sing as much as he emotes, but when this young talent spins his altruistic tales of unrequited love lost and found, depression doesn't sound any sweeter than this." The Guardian thought that "there are uncanny reminders of the late Nick Drake in some of his songs."

== Track listing ==
1. "Ohio"
2. "Tragedy"
3. "Curbside"
4. "Honey Baby"
5. "Eyes for Windows"
6. "Letters & Drawings"
7. "Love the Same"
8. "Saturday"
9. "Tornado"
10. "Rehearsals for Departure"
