= The Mynabirds =

American indie pop band

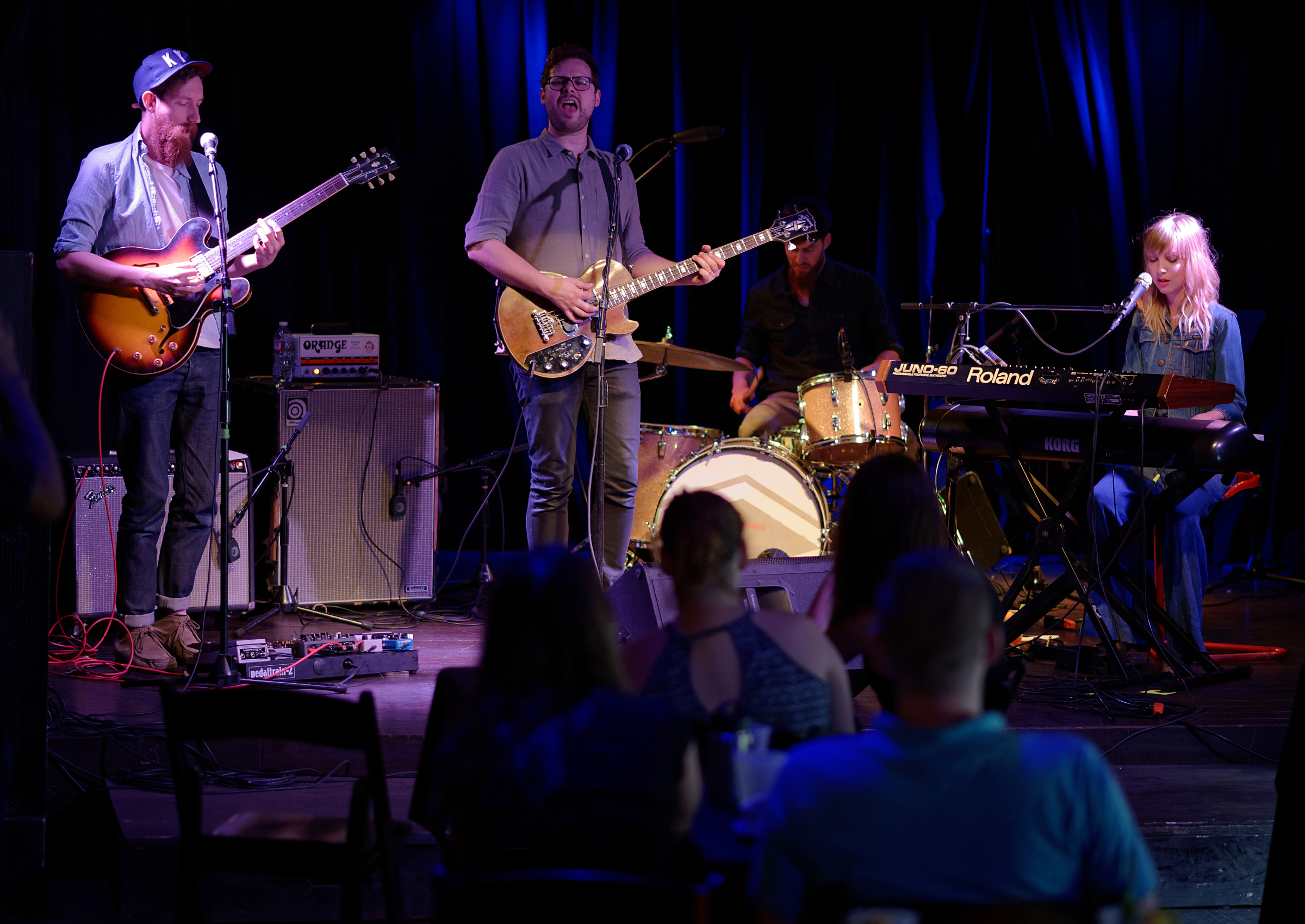

Background information
- Origin: Omaha, Nebraska, United States
- Genres: Indie pop, indie rock, garage rock, blue-eyed soul, shoegaze, new wave
- Years active: 2009–present
- Labels: Saddle Creek
- Members: Laura Burhenn
- Past members: Tom Hnatow; Tyler Odom; Patrick Damphier; Nicole Childrey; Rebecca Marie Miller

The Mynabirds are an American indie pop band founded by singer-songwriter and pianist Laura Burhenn, who was previously one half of the Washington, D.C., indie duo Georgie James. Burhenn formed the Mynabirds in 2009, and shortly after signed to Saddle Creek Records and relocated to Omaha, Nebraska. The sound has been described by Pitchfork as "...openhearted, politically engaged, feminist pop that, miraculously, never veers into schmaltz."

== History ==
=== Laura Burhenn early years (1994–2008) ===
After years of classical piano and stints singing and playing keyboards in rock bands and electronica projects in Washington, D.C., Burhenn founded her own record label, Laboratory Records, and began releasing solo work. Burhenn's first solo record, Not Ashamed to Say, was released in 1999 and is a collection of thirteen songs written from 1994 to 1998. After releasing a split 7" in 2003, Burhenn released the full-length Wanderlust in 2004. In 2005, Burhenn teamed up with John Davis, drummer of defunct DC trio Q and Not U, to form Georgie James. Laura first worked with Saddle Creek in 2007 on Georgie James' debut LP, Places. The duo parted ways in late 2008.

=== What We Lose in the Fire We Gain in the Flood (2010) ===
Burhenn went into the studio with Richard Swift in the summer of 2009 and recorded what would become the debut album from the Mynabirds. The band signed with Saddle Creek in January 2010 and released What We Lose in the Fire We Gain in the Flood to critical acclaim in April 2010. Anthony Lombardi described the record in PopMatters as "...a soul-purging, powerful statement of survival and self-assertion that stands head and shoulders above the current crop of navel-gazers populating today’s underground music scene." The Mynabirds supported their debut LP with more than a year of touring with Bright Eyes, David Bazan and Crooked Fingers. Burhenn also toured at this time as a member of Bright Eyes.

=== Generals (2012) ===
At the end of 2011, Burhenn headed back into the studio with Swift to begin work on the Mynabirds' second album, Generals. Saddle Creek released the title-track single in February 2012 as a free download. The album was released on June 5, and was met with near universal critical acclaim, with Gianna Stefanelli of CMJ describing the work as "...a serious and intellectual pop album." The album's name, and cover art, were inspired by Richard Avedon's photograph The Generals of the Daughters of the American Revolution.

=== Laura Burhenn tour with The Postal Service (2013) ===
In 2013, Burhenn was a touring member of the Postal Service's reunion tour. She provided back-up vocals along with Jenny Lewis.

=== Lovers Know (2015) ===
In May 2015, The Mynabirds' official website announced that Lovers Know would be released on August 7, 2015, via Saddle Creek. Lovers Know took a year to make, as Burhenn drove across the US twice and toured South Africa solo while writing. Burhenn then spent eight months in studios in Los Angeles, Nashville, Joshua Tree and Auckland, New Zealand with producer Bradley Hanan Carter (of Black English).

The first single, "Semantics", debuted on NPR's All Songs Considered on May 12, 2015.

=== Be Here Now (2017) ===
In the summer of 2017, Burhenn released a series of EPs that culminated in the release of the album Be Here Now. This album was the product of two weeks of writing and recording with singer-songwriter, multi-instrumentalist, and record producer Patrick Damphier in Nashville, Tennessee after the inauguration of Donald Trump and the 2017 Women's March.

== Members ==
- Laura Burhenn – vocals, keyboards, piano

=== Past members ===
- Tom Hnatow – guitar
- Tyler Odom – guitar
- Patrick Damphier – bass, percussion, vocals
- Nicole Childrey – drums, vocals
- Rebecca Marie Miller – vocals, percussion, trumpet

== Discography ==
Year	Details	Peak chart positions	
Year	Details	US	US Heat
2010	What We Lose in the Fire We Gain in the Flood: Released: April 27, 2010; Label: Saddle Creek	—	36
2012	Generals: Released: June 5, 2012; Label: Saddle Creek	—	18
2015	Lovers Know: Released: August 7, 2015; Label: Saddle Creek	—	—
2017	Be Here Now: Released: August 25, 2017; Label: Saddle Creek	—	—
2025	It's Okay to Go Back If You Keep Moving Forward: Released: November 7, 2025; Label: Our Secret Handshake	—	—
"—" denotes album that did not chart or was not released
