= Only with Laughter Can You Win =

Studio album by Rosie Thomas
- Released: September 23, 2003
- Genre: Alternative
- Length: 39:03
- Label: Sub Pop
- Producers: Rosie Thomas, Eric Fisher, Martin Feveyear

Rosie Thomas chronology
Paper Aeroplane (2002)	Only with Laughter Can You Win (2003)	If Songs Could Be Held (2005)

Only with Laughter Can You Win is the second album by American singer-songwriter Rosie Thomas, released on September 23, 2003 by Sub Pop.

The album's title is taken from the lyric of Joni Mitchell's "Roses Blue". "All My Life" was used in the television series Alias. "Let Myself Fall", recorded in St. John's Church, Detroit, features a duet with Thomas's mother and her father, brothers and sister also feature on "I Play Music". The album also features Sam Beam (Iron & Wine) on "Red Rover".

"I Play Music", "Red Rover", and "Sell all my Things" were included as sample music on Windows XP Media Center Edition in 2005.

== Reception ==
Professional ratings
Review scores
Source	Rating
AllMusic	3/5 stars
The Boston Herald	favorable
Christianity Today	Positive
Pitchfork Media	5.4/10
Pittsburgh City Paper	favorable
PopMatters	favorable
Punknews.org	2/5 stars

The album received favorable reviews from PopMatters, the Pittsburgh City Paper, The Boston Herald, and Christianity Today. AllMusic gave the album a three star rating. Pitchfork Media gave it 5.4 out of 10, with Amanda Petrusich describing it as "a solidly crafted, fully realized work" but "a heartbreakingly predictable singer/songwriter collection". The Stranger called it "a gorgeously understated indie-folk album that demonstrates how entwined Thomas' life and music are".

== Track listing ==
All songs written by Rosie Thomas.

1. "Let Myself Fall" – 1:52
2. "I Play Music" – 3:38
3. "Red Rover" – 3:20
4. "Sell All My Things" – 3:54
5. "Crazy" – 2:35
6. "One More Day" – 4:15
7. "All My Life" – 3:19
8. "You and Me" – 2:04
9. "Tell Me How" – 3:52
10. "Gradually" – 5:05
11. "Dialogue" – 5:02
