= And Now That I'm in Your Shadow =

And Now That I'm In Your Shadow

Studio album by Damien Jurado
- Released: October 10, 2006
- Genre: Folk rock, indie folk
- Length: 48:12
- Label: Secretly Canadian
- Producer: Eric Fisher

And Now That I'm in Your Shadow is the sixth studio album by American rock musician Damien Jurado. It was released on 10 October 2006 by Secretly Canadian.

== Track listing ==
| No. | Title | Length |
|---|---|---|
| 1. | "Hoquiam" | 3:31 |
| 2. | "Denton, TX" | 3:03 |
| 3. | "I Had No Intentions" | 4:17 |
| 4. | "Hotel Hospital" | 1:09 |
| 5. | "And Now That I'm In Your Shadow" | 5:03 |
| 6. | "What Were The Chances" | 4:27 |
| 7. | "Shannon Rhodes" | 5:10 |
| 8. | "There Goes Your Man" | 2:14 |
| 9. | "I Am Still Here" | 4:38 |
| 10. | "Gasoline Drinks" | 4:36 |
| 11. | "Survived By Her Husband" | 2:47 |
| 12. | "Gas Station" | 3:26 |
| 13. | "Montesano" | 3:58 |

Professional ratings
Aggregate scores
| Source | Rating |
|---|---|
| Metacritic | (76/100) |
Review scores
| Source | Rating |
| Allmusic | 3.5/5 stars |
| The A.V. Club | (B) |
| Pitchfork Media | (7.4/10) |
