= Damien Jurado =

American singer-songwriter (born 1972)

- Jurado in 2010

Background information
- Born: November 12, 1972 (age 54)
- Origin: Seattle, Washington, United States
- Genre: Indie rock
- Occupation: Musician
- Instruments: Acoustic guitar; electric guitar
- Years active: 1995–present
- Labels: Maraqopa; Loose; Secretly Canadian; Sub Pop
- Formerly of: Hoquiam
- Spouse: Robyn O'Neil
- Website: damienjurado.com

Damien Troy Jurado (/hərˈɑːdoʊ/; born November 12, 1972) is an American singer-songwriter from Seattle, Washington, United States. Over the years, he has released albums on Sub Pop, Secretly Canadian, Loose, and is currently on his own label, Maraqopa Records.

== Music career ==
Jurado's solo career began during the mid-1990s, releasing lo-fi folk based recordings on his own cassette-only label, Casa Recordings. Gaining a local cult following in Seattle, he was brought to the attention of Sub Pop Records by Sunny Day Real Estate singer Jeremy Enigk. After two 7-inch releases (Motorbike and Trampoline) Sub Pop issued his first full album, Waters Ave S. in 1997. His second album, Rehearsals for Departure, was released in 1999, produced by Ken Stringfellow (The Posies, Big Star, R.E.M.).

He often makes use of found sound and field recording techniques, and has experimented with different forms of tape recordings. In 2000 he released Postcards and Audio Letters, a collection of found audio letters and fragments that he had found from sources such as thrift store tape players and answering machines. Also released in 2000 was Ghost of David, Jurado's bleakest and most personal sounding record to date. I Break Chairs (2002) was produced by long-time friend, Pedro the Lion's David Bazan. It was his last album for Sub Pop, and was a much rockier, electric affair.

After signing for the Indiana-based label Secretly Canadian, Jurado reverted to his trademark folk ballad-based style, releasing four more albums: Where Shall You Take Me? (2003), On My Way to Absence, (2005) And Now That I'm in Your Shadow (2006) and the rockier Caught in the Trees (2008).

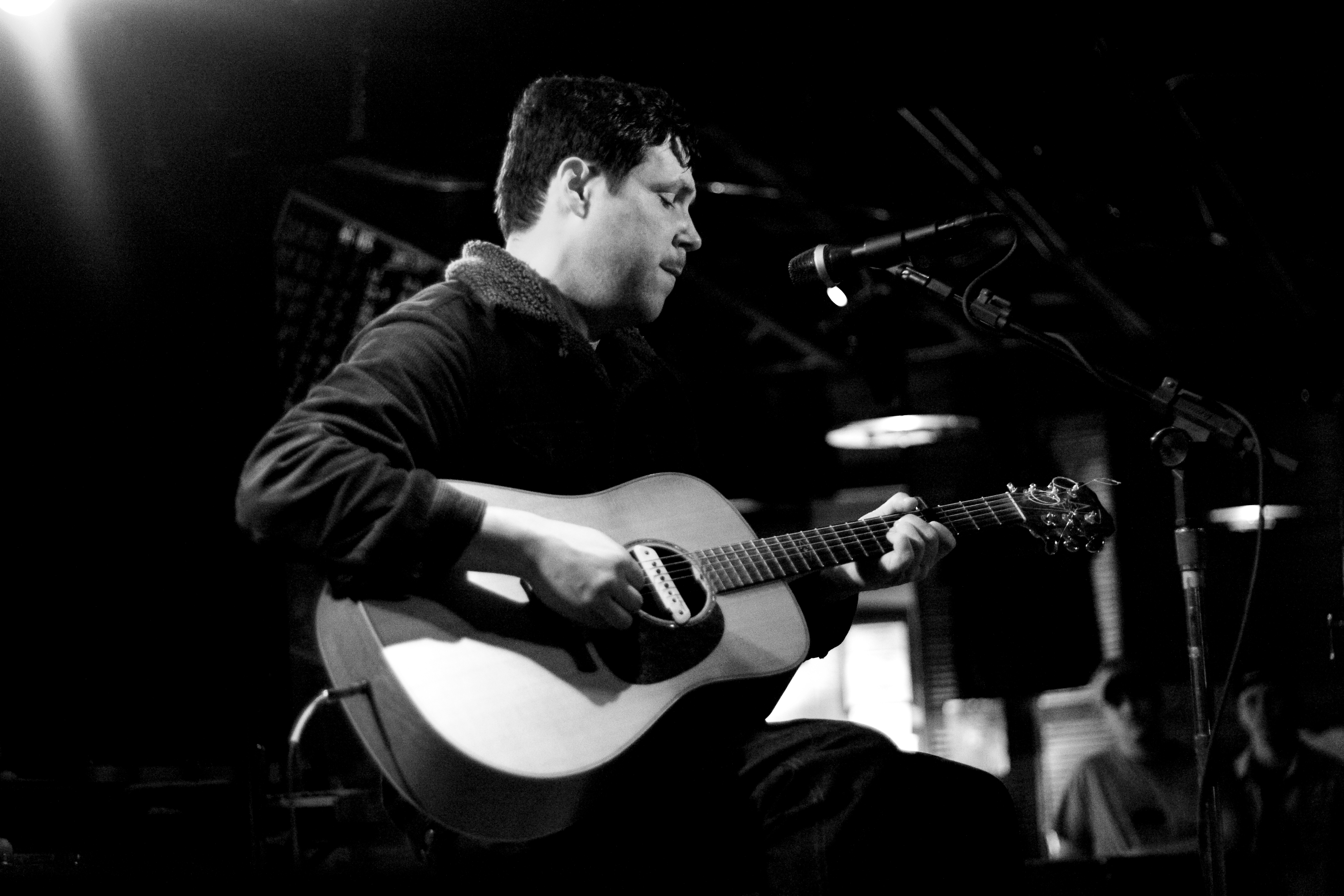
Damien Jurado performing in Denton, Texas, in 2009

In 2009, Jurado teamed with his brother Drake to issue an LP under the moniker Hoquiam, released on February 23, 2010. The album preceded Damien's next solo release, Saint Bartlett, which was released May 25, 2010, and was produced by label mate Richard Swift. After touring the album with Kay Kay and His Weathered Underground, Jurado began work on his next album. On February 21, 2012, he released his 10th studio album, Maraqopa, his sixth for Secretly Canadian. In January 2014, Jurado released Brothers and Sisters of the Eternal Son, an album which marked the third straight collaboration with producer Richard Swift. In March 2016, Jurado released Visions of Us on the Land, and in December of the same year he and Swift released a collection of covers from 2010, Other People's Songs, Volume 1. In 2016, Damien Jurado released The Horizon Just Laughed, his first self produced album, recorded at L.A. studio Sonikwire. In 2018, Jurado left Secretly Canadian to join Mama Bird Recording Co. and Loose Music, and subsequently released the albums In The Shape Of A Storm (2019), and What's New, Tomboy? (2020)

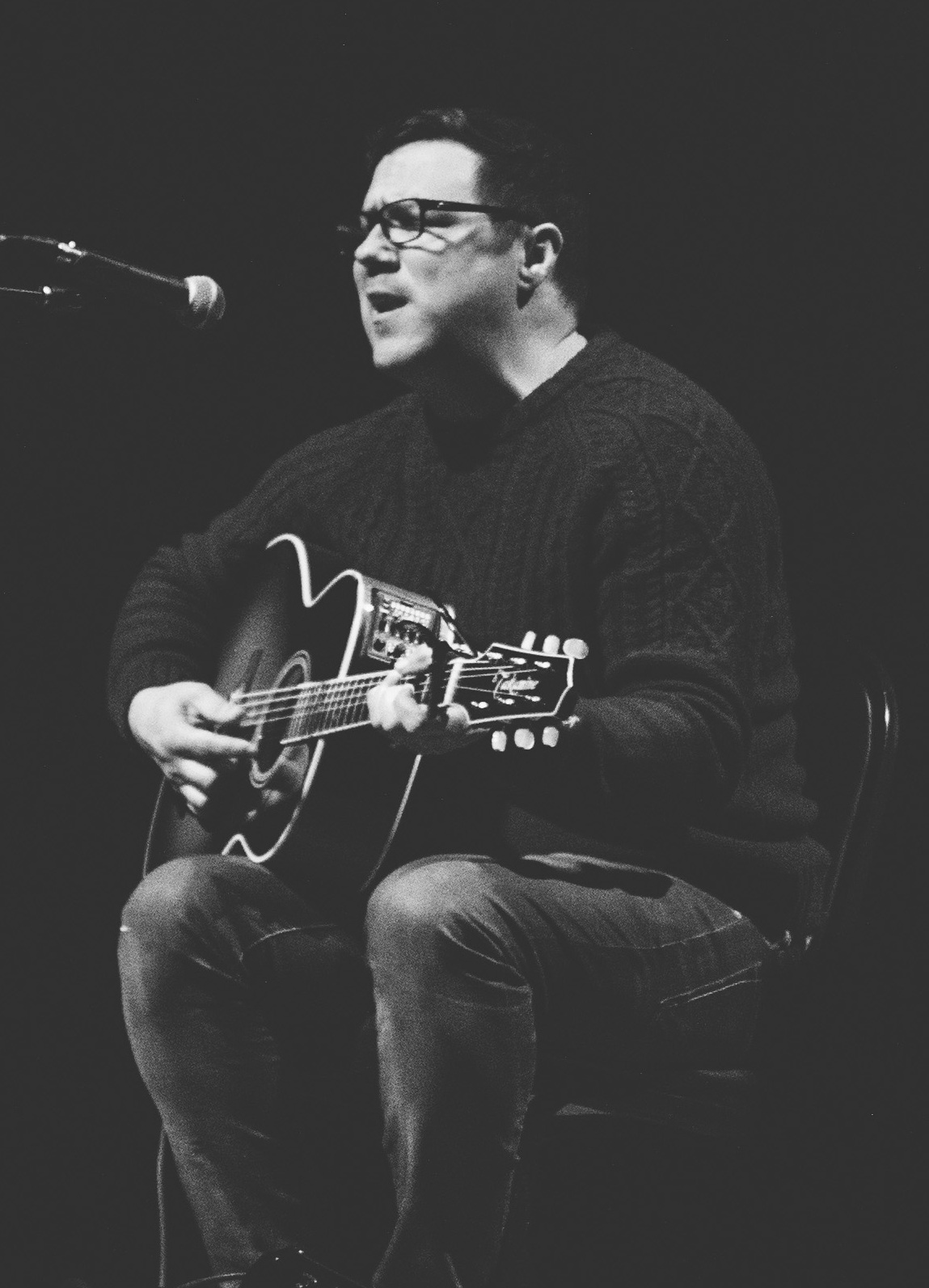
Jurado performing at the Peabody Opera House in St. Louis, Missouri, in February 2015.

In 2021, Jurado established Maraqopa Records for all of his future releases.

On the 14th of May 2021, Jurado released his 17th full length studio album, The Monster Who Hated Pennsylvania.

On the 24th of June 2022, Jurado released his 18th full length studio album, Reggae Film Star.

On March 31, 2023, Jurado released his 19th studio album, Sometimes You Hurt the Ones You Hate. Prior to the release, Jurado announced that he would no longer be releasing music on Spotify, citing the company's low royalty rates for artists. Jurado eventually decided to release this album, and all future releases, on Spotify.

On October 12, 2023, Jurado released his 20th studio album, Motorcycle Madness. Physical copies of the album were limited to 200 vinyl records, and 100 compact discs.

On November 1, 2023, Jurado released his 21st studio album, Passing the Giraffes. The release marked Jurado's third studio album of 2023.

On January 8, 2024, Jurado released, Roger's Audition: The "Reggae Film Star" Demos. Physical copies of the album were limited to 100 compact discs.

Jurado released two non-album singles, "I've Never Known Alice" and "Call Me, Madame", on August 5, 2024.

Jurado released Motorcycle Madness ('25) on February 14, 2025. In an online post, Jurado described the album as the "completed" version of the previous 2023 release. He elaborated, saying the 2023 release of Motorcycle Madness was essentially a "rehearsal" for the upcoming release. Unlike the 2023 version, Motorcycle Madness ('25) has a stereo mix.

On October 30, 2025, Jurado released his 22nd studio album, Private Hospital. Jurado made the decision to forego traditional formats, and released it as a book.

On May 1, 2026, Jurado released, Did Something In Me Break?, a collaborative full-length LP with folk musician, Lilly Miller.

=== Collaborations and contributions ===
Jurado features on the song, "Almost Home," from Moby's album, Innocents.

He is also featured in an episode of the BYUtv music documentary series Audio-Files.

Jurado's song, "Everything Trying," appeared in the NBC series, The Blacklist (Season 1, episode 12), in the 2013 Best Foreign Film Oscar film The Great Beauty, in the Fox series House M.D. (Season 7, Episode 14), and in the 2011 film The Dilemma.

The 2014 Joe Carnahan directed crime thriller, Stretch, features Jurado's song, "Let Us All In," during the end of the film.

He duets with Lotte Kestner on her song, "Turn the Wolves," on the 2013 album, The Bluebird of Happiness.

The soundtrack for the 2015 romantic comedy, Tumbledown, includes several songs by Jurado.

Richard Swift produced four of his albums.

Jurado's track "A.M. AM" from Visions of Us on the Land is prominently featured in Episode 3 as well as "Cloudy Shoes" from Saint Bartlett in Episode 6 of the 2018 Netflix documentary series Wild Wild Country.

Jurado's song, "Silver Joy," is featured on the soundtrack to the 2023 Christmas comedy-drama, The Holdovers.

In February 2026, Phoebe Bridgers contacted Jurado to ask his permission to interpolate the melodies of "The Last Great Washington State", from his 2018 album The Horizon Just Laughed. She credited Jurado's song with helping her overcome a period of writer's block while processing the death of her father. She listened to the song on repeat and began inserting her own lyrics. The resulting song became the title track of her record Lost Weekend, released later that same year. Jurado received a co-writing credit on the track.

== Albums ==
| Title | Album details |
|---|---|
| Waters Ave S. | Released: January 1997; Label: Sub Pop; Formats: CD, LP, Digital |
| Rehearsals for Departure | Released: March 1999; Label: Sub Pop; Formats: CD, LP, Digital |
| Postcards and Audio Letters | Released: 2000; Label: Made in Mexico; Formats: CD |
| Ghost of David | Released: September 2000; Label: Sub Pop; Formats: CD, LP, Digital |
| I Break Chairs | Released: February 2002; Label: Sub Pop; Formats: CD, LP, Digital |
| Where Shall You Take Me? | Released: March 2003; Label: Secretly Canadian; Formats: CD, LP, Digital |
| This Fabulous Century | Released: October 2004; Label: Burnt Toast; Formats: LP, Digital |
| On My Way to Absence | Released: April 2005; Label: Secretly Canadian; Formats: CD, LP, Digital |
| And Now That I'm in Your Shadow | Released: October 2006; Label: Secretly Canadian; Formats: CD, LP, Digital |
| Caught in the Trees | Released: September 2008; Label: Secretly Canadian; Formats: CD, LP |
| Saint Bartlett | Released: May 2010; Label: Secretly Canadian; Formats: CD, LP, Digital |
| Live at Landlocked | Released: April 16, 2011; Label: Secretly Canadian; Formats: LP (Record Store Day exclusive), Digital |
| Maraqopa | Released: February 21, 2012; Label: Secretly Canadian; Formats: CD, LP, Digital |
| Brothers and Sisters of the Eternal Son | Released: January 21, 2014; Label: Secretly Canadian; Formats: CD, LP, Digital |
| Visions of Us on the Land | Released: March 18, 2016; Label: Secretly Canadian; Formats: CD, LP, Digital |
| Other People’s Songs, Vol. 1 (with Richard Swift) | Released: December 2, 2016; Label: Secretly Canadian; Formats: CD, LP |
| The Horizon Just Laughed | Released: May 4, 2018; Label: Secretly Canadian; Formats: CD, LP, Digital |
| In the Shape of a Storm | Released: April 12, 2019; Label: Mama Bird Recording Co. / Loose; Formats: CD, LP, Digital |
| What's New, Tomboy? | Released: May 1, 2020; Label: Mama Bird Recording Co. Formats: CD, LP, Digital |
| The Monster Who Hated Pennsylvania | Released: May 14, 2021; Label: Maraqopa Records; Formats: CD, LP, Digital |
| Reggae Film Star | Released: June 24, 2022; Label: Maraqopa Records; Formats: CD, LP, Digital |
| Sometimes You Hurt the Ones You Hate | Released: March 31, 2023; Label: Maraqopa Records; Formats: CD, LP, Digital |
| Motorcycle Madness | Released: October 13, 2023; Label: Maraqopa Records; Formats: CD, LP, Digital |
| Passing the Giraffes | Released: November 1, 2023; Label: Maraqopa Records; Formats: CD, Digital |
| Roger’s Audition: The "Reggae Film Star" Demos | Released: January 8, 2024; Label: Maraqopa Records; Formats: CD, Digital |
| Motorcycle Madness ('25) | Released: February 14, 2025; Label: Maraqopa Records; Formats: LP, Digital |
| I Lost My Wig: The "Motorcycle Madness" Home Demos | Released: April 15, 2025; Label: Maraqopa Records; Formats: Digital |
| Cutting: "Caught in the Trees" Studio Outtakes & Home Demos | Released: September 20, 2025; Label: Maraqopa Records; Formats: Digital |
| Taller Than Trees and Brighter Than Starlight: "Saint Bartlett" Home Demos | Released: September 21, 2025; Label: Maraqopa Records; Formats: Digital |
| "Sometimes You Hurt the Ones You Hate" Home Demos | Released: September 26, 2025; Label: Maraqopa Records; Formats: Digital |
| Private Hospital | Released: October 30, 2025; Label: Maraqopa Records; Formats: Digital |
| "Hoquiam": Bon Fire Demos | Released: November 10. 2025; Label: Maraqopa Records; Formats: Digital |
| Horses On The Runway: "Passing The Giraffes" Demos & Studio Outtakes | Released: November 21, 2025; Label: Maraqopa Records; Formats: Digital |
| Everyone A Star: "Maraqopa" Live (2012) | Released: December 05, 2025; Label: Maraqopa Records; Formats: Digital |
| Motorcycle Madness: Rehearsal Demos - November 4th 2022 | Released: February 6, 2026; Label: Maraqopa Records; Formats: CD, Digital |
| Motorcycle Madness: Studio Day 1 - November 28th, 2022 | Released: February 6, 2026; Label: Maraqopa Records; Formats: CD, Digital |
| All Are Welcome In: A Return To "Maraqopa" | Released: March 16, 2026; Label: Maraqopa Records; Formats: Digital |
| Live At Mohawk Place: Buffalo, NY - October 22nd, 2002 | Released: April 25, 2026; Label: Maraqopa Records; Formats: Digital |
| Did Something In Me Break? (with Lilly Miller) | Released: May 1, 2026; Label: Maraqopa Records; Formats: Digital |
| Soft Violence: Demos | Released: June 5, 2026; Label: Maraqopa Records; Formats: Digital |

== EPs ==
| Title | EP details |
|---|---|
| Motorbike | Released: 1995; Label: Sub Pop; Formats: 7" |
| Trampoline | Released: 1996; Label: Sub Pop; Formats: 7" |
| Vary | Released: 1997; Label: Tooth & Nail; Formats: 7" |
| Gathered In Song | Released: 1998; Label: Made in Mexico; Formats: CD |
| Four Songs | Released: 2002; Label: Burnt Toast Vinyl; Formats: 12", Digital |
| Holding His Breath | Released: 2003; Label: Acuarela; Formats: CD |
| Just In Time For Something | Released: 2004; Label: Secretly Canadian; Formats: CD, Digital |
| Gathered In Song (Re-release with bonus tracks) | Released: 2007; Label: Made in Mexico; Formats: CD, Digital |
| LEM: Volume 1, January 2010 | Released: 2010; Label: Flannelgraph Records / Crossroads of America; Formats: CD, Cassette, Digital |
| Our Turn To Shine (Bonus EP to Saint Bartlett, Amazon UK exclusive) | Released: 2010; Label: Secretly Canadian; Formats: Digital |
| The Maraqopa Sessions (Bonus EP celebrating Maraqopa inclusion on Rough Trade’s Best Albums of 2012) | Released: 2012; Label: Secretly Canadian; Formats: Digital |
| Recorded Live At Little Elephant | Released: 2017; Label: Little Elephant; Formats: 12", Digital |
| Unissued EP | Released: 2020; Label: Self-released; Formats: CD |
| Left Open EP | Released: 2026; Label: Maraqopa Records; Formats: Digital |
| Keith Is Plane Crazy | Released: 2026; Label: Maraqopa Records; Formats: Digital |
| Suddenly Your're Leaving Town | Released: 2026; Label: Maraqopa Records; Formats: Digital |
| Bird Traps | Released: 2026; Label: Maraqopa Records; Formats: Digital |

== Singles ==
| Title | Single details |
|---|---|
| "Halo Friendly" | Released: 1997; Label: Summershine; Formats: 7" |
| "Chevrolet" | Released: 1998 (UK only); Label: Snowstorm; Formats: 7" |
| "Letters & Drawings" | Released: 1998 (UK only); Label: Ryko; Formats: CD |
| "Big Let Down / Make Up Your Mind" | Released: 2002; Label: Secretly Canadian; Formats: 7", Digital |
| "Traded for Fire / Ghost of David" (Split with Dolorean) | Released: 2006; Label: Secretly Canadian; Formats: 7" |
| "Diamond Sea / Pentagrams" (Part of The Maraqopa Sessions) | Released: 2012; Label: Secretly Canadian; Formats: 7", Digital |
| "Clouds Beyond / Let Us All In" (Part of The Maraqopa Sessions) | Released: 2012; Label: Secretly Canadian; Formats: 7", Digital |
| "Wyoming Songbirds / Ghost of David (The Return)" (Part of The Maraqopa Sessions) | Released: 2012; Label: Secretly Canadian; Formats: 7", Digital |
| "Birds Tricked Into The Trees" (Limited Record Store Day Release) | Released: 2020; Label: Mama Bird Recording Co. Formats: 7" |

== Digital singles ==
| Year | Label | Songs |
|---|---|---|
| 2014 | Secretly Canadian | "Ohio" (Filous Remix) |
| 2015 | Secretly Canadian | "Exit 353" |
| 2020 | Mama Bird Recording Co. | "Birds Tricked Into The Trees" "Alice Hyatt" |
| 2021 | Maraqopa Records | "Helena" "Take Your Time" |
| 2022 | Maraqopa Records | "Roger" |
| 2024 | Maraqopa Records | "I've Never Known Alice / I've Never Known Alice (B-Side)" "Call Me, Madame (Smoking Version) / Call Me, Madame (Non-Smoking Version)" "Sheets ('24) / Des Moines" "Ohio ('24) / Little America / Always Memphis" |
| 2025 | Maraqopa Records | "The Last Great Washington State ('25)" "For Each Familiar Scene / Robin Oswald As She Appears In 1978" "Wearing Your Violence" "We Will Provide The Lightning: The Notes Of Seasons / We Are What We Dream" "Second Story Story: Montreal / Maine" "Gathered And Stolen By Storm: On The Land Blues (Acoustic 12-String Version) / The Moon/The Sun" "Kola (Technicolor Version)" "Tundra" "Paper Canoe" "Easy Now: Orphans In The Key Of E / Anchors" |
| 2026 | Maraqopa Records | "The New Kind" "A Place Reserved For Reverse" "Nature With All Her Force Will Have The Final Word" "I Was Always Leaving: Leaving My Keys In Kennewick / It Will Come Back" (Damien Jurado/Lilly Miller split single) "Now And Then: Cheryl Retreats / Cheryl's Cake" |
