= Music of Washington (state) =

Washington in the United States

The U.S. state of Washington has been home to many popular musicians and several major hotbeds of musical innovation throughout its history. The largest city in the state, Seattle, is known for being the birthplace of grunge as well as a major contributor to the evolution of punk rock, indie music, folk, and hip hop. Nearby Tacoma and Olympia have also been centers of influence on popular music.

Several world-famous musicians have come from Washington. Bing Crosby, the crooner born in Tacoma in 1903 and raised in Spokane, had a number-one hit in the U.S. in 1942 with "White Christmas." Jimi Hendrix, one of classic rock's most enduring guitar legends, was born and raised in Seattle and is buried in Renton, and folk rock singer-songwriter Kenny Loggins, who had a No. 1 Hot 100 hit in 1984 with "Footloose," was born in Everett. Saxophonist Kenny G is from Seattle and attended the University of Washington.

== Classical ==
The Seattle Symphony was founded in 1903. Milton Katims (1954–1976) and Gerard Schwarz (1985–2011) have been the longest-tenured conductors. The Spokane Symphony was founded in 1945. The Seattle Chamber Players was founded in 1989. They are known for their interpretations of modern compositions. Seattle Pro Musica (founded 1972), Seattle Girls Choir (founded 1982), and Choral Arts (founded 1993) are all award-winning choral music groups. Notable individuals from Washington state include pianist Kenneth Boulton, composer/pianist William Bolcom, composer Peter Scott Lewis, composer Mateo Messina, composer/clarinetist Sean Osborn, composer/pianist/violinist Jennifer Thomas, all from Seattle, and composer/pianist Charlie Albright from Centralia.

The Seattle Opera company was founded in 1963 by impresario Glynn Ross, who served as musical director until 1983. Notable vocalists from Washington state include the sopranos Patrice Munsel from Spokane, Angela Meade from Centralia, and the baritones Roald Reitan from Tacoma and Thomas Hampson, also from Spokane. All have performed at the Metropolitan Opera at one time or another.

== Jazz ==
Washington State has had a jazz scene since the early 20th century, primarily centered in Seattle. In the early years, there was an African-American jazz scene on Seattle's Jackson Street, led by the Whangdoodle Entertainers, featuring, amongst others, Frank D. Waldron (trumpet/alto saxophone). Waldron later joined the Odean Jazz Orchestra, one of the rare African-American bands in that era to play in downtown Seattle. He remained active in Seattle jazz as a musician and teacher until his death in 1955. On the other side of the tracks, Vic Meyers (saxophone) led jazz bands playing in Seattle's Pioneer Square and Belltown districts. Meyers left music for politics in the early 1930s and served as Lieutenant Governor of Washington from 1933 to 1953 and then Secretary of State of Washington from 1957 to 1965. Another notable jazz figure in the early days was Harold Weeks, a ragtime composer/lyricist known as the co-writer (with Oliver Wallace) of the 1918 song "Hindustan," considered a jazz standard. Joe Darensbourg (clarinet/saxophone) was active in Seattle from 1929 until 1944, and Dick Wilson (tenor saxophone) played in his band from 1930 until 1936.

The early 1940s saw Jimmy Rowles (piano) come out of Spokane and Corky Corcoran (tenor saxophone) from Tacoma. In the late 1940s, Bumps Blackwell led a Seattle band that featured teenaged future icons Ray Charles (piano), Quincy Jones (trumpet), Ernestine Anderson (vocals), and Buddy Catlett (double bass). Also emerging out of Seattle during this time were Patti Bown (piano/vocals), Gerald Brashear (congas/scat singer), Elmer Gill (piano/vibraphone/vocals), and Floyd Standifer (tenor saxophone/trumpet), while Don Lanphere (tenor & soprano saxophone) came out of Wenatchee. Catlett, Brashear, Standifer, and Lanphere spent their latter years playing jazz in the Seattle scene.

The 1950s–1960s saw Tom Collier (percussion/vibraphone), David Friesen (double bass/electric upright bass) and Tim Gemmill (tenor & soprano saxophone/flute/keyboards) come out of Seattle, Ralph Towner (12-string & classical guitar/piano/synthesizer) from Chehalis, Gary Peacock (double bass) from Yakima and Larry Coryell (guitar from Richland. Only Collier returned to the Seattle scene.

The 1970s saw the emergence of Kenny G (soprano, alto, and tenor saxophone/flute) from Seattle, a smooth jazz artist with 16 Grammy nominations. Jeff Lorber (keyboards) came out of Vancouver, Washington, and also forged a career in smooth jazz, as well as jazz fusion, with 7 Grammy nominations of his own. In 1971, Clarence Acox Jr. (drums) arrived in Seattle from his native New Orleans to revive the marching band at Garfield High School. In 1979 he started the Garfield Jazz Ensemble, which he led until his retirement in 2019. The Ensemble has earned many awards and honors. Acox has also been active as a musician in the Seattle scene. Hadley Caliman (saxophone/flute) moved to tiny Cathlamet in the 1970s and later led combos in Seattle during the 1990s and 2000s. John Holte (reeds) was a leader of the West Coast Swing Band revival of the 1970s and continued to lead various swing bands in Seattle until his death in 2003. Cheryl Bentyne (vocals), who grew up in Mount Vernon, sang in Holte's New Deal Rhythm Band before joining the renowned vocal group The Manhattan Transfer in 1979, with whom she has won 10 Grammy Awards.

The 1980s were the career beginnings of native Washingtonians Diane "Deedles" Schuur (vocals/piano) from Auburn, who has won two Grammy Awards, Bill Anschell (piano), Jeff Kashiwa (saxophone) and Skerik (tenor & baritone saxophone/electronics), a pioneer of saxophonics. Anschell, Kashiwa and Skerik remain active in the Seattle scene, with Skerik playing in a number of diverse local bands. The 80s also saw Julian Priester (trombone/euphonium), Amy Denio (saxophone/accordion/vocals) and Bill Frisell (guitar) relocate to Seattle. Frisell had previously been active in New York City's Downtown Scene.

The 1990s saw the emergence from Seattle of Cuong Vu (trumpet), Marc Seales (piano), Jim Black (drums), Joe Doria (Hammond organ) and Jessica Lurie (woodwinds). Lurie is active in the Seattle bands Living Daylights and The Tiptons Sax Quartet. The aforementioned Amy Denio is also a member of The Tiptons Sax Quartet. Seales and Doria are also active in Seattle. Lounge band Nightcaps was formed in 1995 and continues to occasionally play in the Pacific Northwest.

The new millennium has produced Roxy Coss (saxophone), Aaron Parks (piano), Emi Meyer (piano/vocals) and The Bergevin Brothers band, all from Seattle. Meyer and the Bergevins remain active in the Seattle scene. In the early 2000s husband and wife Wayne Horvitz (keyboards) and Robin Holcomb (piano/vocals) relocated to Seattle. Both had previously been involved in New York City's Downtown Scene. In 2015, Dmitri Matheny (flugelhorn) relocated from his long-time base in San Francisco to Centralia. In 2022, he released the album CASCADIA, celebrating the Pacific Northwest. The album also features the aforementioned Bill Anschell.

== Country/Alt-country ==
Washington state has a limited tradition in country music, but has produced some notable artists. In the 1920s, Paul Tutmarc established himself as a fine tenor and lap steel guitarist in Seattle. He was also known for inventing the first electric bass guitar in 1936. Tutmarc continued to perform and teach guitar in Seattle into the 1960s. Fiddler Bus Boyk came out of Everett in the 1930s and had a long career, eventually being inducted into the Western Swing Society's Pioneers of Western Swing Hall of Fame.

The late 1950s saw three Country Music Hall of Famers active in Washington state. Loretta Lynn began her performing and songwriting career while living in the tiny logging community of Custer. She also played in nearby Blaine. Loretta wrote and recorded her first single "I'm a Honky Tonk Girl" while living in Washington (although the song was recorded in Los Angeles). The song was a hit and it was off to Nashville and superstardom. Willie Nelson took a job as a DJ at KVAN in Vancouver, Washington, in 1956, where he also played local clubs. While there he cut his first record "No Place for Me". Nelson left Vancouver in 1958. In 1958, Buck Owens was working in Tacoma at radio station KAYE, when he saw Don Rich, a young fiddler from Olympia, play. Owens immediately asked Rich to join his band and soon they were being featured on the weekly BAR-K Jamboree on KTNT-TV. Loretta Lynn made her television debut on the same program. Owens left Tacoma around 1960 to return to Bakersfield, California, and in a few months, Rich followed and became a member of Buck's backup band The Buckaroos, eventually becoming the lead guitarist. Rich's Fender Telecaster was an instrumental part of the Bakersfield sound of the 1960s.

The late 1950s also saw the emergence of native Washingtonian Bonnie Guitar, who grew up in Redondo and Auburn. Bonnie had her first hit, "Dark Moon", in 1957, which charted on the country and pop charts. Guitar was also a co-founder of Dolton Records and later co-owner of Jerden Records in an era when this was rare for a woman. Before this, she was a student and wife of the aforementioned Paul Tutmarc. After their divorce in 1955, she did session guitar work for several labels in Los Angeles. Later in life, she bred cattle and quarter-horses near Orting, before finally settling in Soap Lake, where she continued to perform on weekends until the age of 92. Guitar died in 2019, at the age of 95.

Seattle-based Lavender Country released their self-titled album in 1973. It is the first known gay-themed country and western album. They would not have another release until 2022's Blackberry Rose. Fiddler Mark O'Connor came out of Mountlake Terrace in the 1970s, winning three Grammy Awards. Michael Peterson grew up in Richland and released his first self-titled album of contemporary Christian songs in 1986. A decade later, he released his second eponymous record in 1997, which produced five Top 40 country hits, including the No. 1 "From Here to Eternity". The 1990s saw alt-country enter the scene, led by Neko Case of Tacoma. With her contralto voice, she has released a series of albums and has also been a part of the revival of the tenor guitar. The Supersuckers formed in Tucson, Arizona, in 1988, relocated to Seattle in 1989, and have been playing cowpunk ever since.

The new millennium has seen the emergence of mainstream country artists Brandy Clark from Morton, who has been nominated for eight Grammy Awards as a songwriter and performer, James Otto from Benton City, who had a No. 1 country hit with "Just Got Started Lovin' You" in 2008, Vince Mira from Federal Way, who began his career busking Spanish-language songs in Pike Place Market, Adam Craig from Tenino, who has been most successful as a songwriter and Seattle based Brent Amaker and the Rodeo, whose image is influenced by Johnny Cash, the "Man in Black" and Spaghetti Westerns. Their live shows sometimes include the "Whiskey Baptism" of fans into the "Church of the Rodeo". Jaime Wyatt from Tacoma plays outlaw country and had a song on the 2004 soundtrack of Wicker Park. Megs McLean from Snohomish plays "crunge", a combination of country and grunge, and had a Country Pick of the Week in 2016. Star Anna from Ellensburg performs alt-country and, with her band the Laughing Dogs, appeared with the Seattle Symphony in 2012. Seattle based alt-country band The Maldives live shows have been described as "transcendent" by KEXP-FM.

== Garage rock ==
In the mid-1950s, the Washington rock scene was kick-started by a Seattle group, The Frantics, led by guitarist Ron Peterson. The Frantics were the first rock group from Seattle to have songs in the national Top 40 charts. Later, several garage bands achieved regional and some national fame. Perhaps the most famous of these are The Wailers, whose regional fame was paramount for several years in the early 1960s. Their version of Richard Berry's "Louie, Louie" became the state's unofficial anthem.

An influential garage rock band called The Regents became local icons in the Tacoma area, but the original incarnation never signed to a record label. They are known for pioneering a distinct sound technology when they fed the rhythm guitar through a Leslie organ speaker during a concert at the University of Puget Sound; this gave them their original sound.

Another Tacoma band, The Sonics, also proved to be influential, and are still a cult favorite. Their name was inspired by one of Seattle's most important employers, Boeing, an aircraft manufacturer, and The Sonics' brand of aggressive guitar rock made them icons in the later development of music in and around Seattle.

Record producer Jerry Dennon of Jerden Records was responsible for bringing The Kingsmen (of Portland, Oregon), best known for their national hit "Louie Louie". The Kingsmen found themselves in a rivalry with local favorite Paul Revere & the Raiders (of Boise, Idaho), who also released a version of "Louie, Louie". The Kingsmen's version eventually caught on nationally after a Boston radio station picked up the song and Dennon negotiated distributing rights with Wand Records out of New York City. The song's supposedly suggestive lyrics led to it being banned in some localities, including Indiana.

== Heavy metal ==
Notable heavy metal bands that emerged in the Seattle area in the 1980s include Metal Church, Queensrÿche, Mentors, TKO, Prowler, Q5, Forced Entry, Sanctuary, Culprit, Bloodgood, Heir Apparent, and Fifth Angel. Metal Church was initially formed while Kurdt Vanderhoof was in the San Francisco scene, but moved back home to Aberdeen and reformed the band with new members from the Grays Harbor area. They became one of the most well-known metal bands from the 1980s thanks to albums like Metal Church (1984), The Dark (1986), Blessing in Disguise (1989) and The Human Factor (1991); they resurfaced in 2004 with The Weight of the World. Queensrÿche is better known for falling somewhere between the heavy metal and glam metal scene, with strong influence from progressive rock, which can be seen in their albums Operation: Mindcrime (1987) and Empire (1991). Going to the mid-end of the '80s, Seattle featured successful thrash metal bands, such as The Accüsed (a crossover thrash band), Assault & Battery, Bitter End, Coven, and Forced Entry.

Also of particular note are Seattle's Slaughter Haus 5, Tacoma bands Sword of Judgement, Hammer Head, Diamond Lie (featuring Jerry Cantrell of Alice in Chains), as well as Olympia bands Cyperus and Death Squad. Two West Seattle metal bands from the 1980s were Sanctuary and Rottweiller. Sanctuary, after two albums and some years revamping, reformed with two original members (bass and vocals) and a former short-term replacement guitarist (along with some new members) and became known as Nevermore. Heir Apparent came out of North Seattle in the mid-1980's, signed to the independent label Black Dragon Records of Paris, France in 1985, and released what remains the highest-rated album in the 40-year history of Germany's ROCK HARD magazine in January 1986. Heir Apparent performed with Sanctuary in 2012 at the Metal Assault Festival in Wurzburg, Germany. In 2019 at the Headbangers Open Air Festival in Germany, Queensrÿche, Sanctuary, and Heir Apparent each headlined an evening of the 3-day event.

More recent underground metal bands include Himsa, Aemaeth, Blood & Thunder, Midnight Idols, Fallen Angels, DEATHBEAT, Big Business, Drown Mary, Evilsmith, Vigilance, Skelator, Ceremonial Castings, Inquisition, Hoth, Inquinok, Pure Hatred, Riot in Rhythm, Deathmocracy, Blood of Kings, Wolves in the Throne Room, Twisted Heroes, Ashes Of Existence, Bleed The Stone, Casualty Of God, Mechanism, I Am Infamy, Devilation, Beyond Theory, Future Disorder, Midnight Drive, Edge of Oblivion, Last Bastion, Phalgeron, and Bell Witch.

== Punk rock ==
In the 1970s, Ze Whiz Kidz helped launch a hardcore punk scene that included ZEKE, Mentors, RPA, The Rejectors, The Lewd, Violent World The Refuzors, Crunchbird, Pod Six, The Enemy, and, most influentially, Solger and The Fartz, as well as new wave bands like The Heats, The Cowboys, The Meyce, The Telepaths, Visible Targets, Chinas Comidas, X-15 and UC5. Hardcore skinhead bands like Extreme Hate, The Boot Boys and Firing Squad also gained a following. Green River, a punk rock band that splintered into Mudhoney and Mother Love Bone, was one of the first grunge bands. Also drawing on the punk rock scene were Melvins, Soundgarden, Nirvana, Fitz of Depression of Olympia and Vitimin C of Centralia. Musician Duff McKagan made his entry into the global rock scene in the punk rock scene of his hometown of Seattle. On the other side of the state, Spokane also contained a punk and new wave scene in the 1980s, as chronicled in the documentary film SpokAnarchy!

In the early 2000s, the experimental punk rock scene had bands such as Botch, Pretty Girls Make Graves, These Arms Are Snakes, The Fall of Troy, Jaguar Love, Unwound and The Blood Brothers.

== Grunge ==
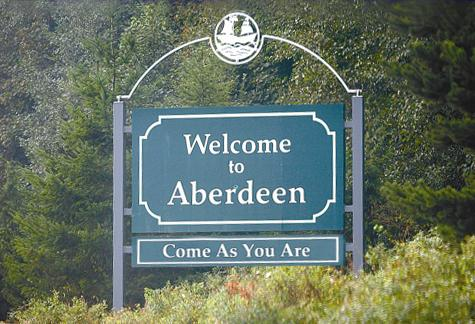
Tribute to Kurt Cobain in Cobain's hometown of Aberdeen, Washington. "Come as You Are" is a song by Nirvana.

Grunge began as a mixture of heavy metal, punk rock and indie rock in the 1980s and gained mainstream prominence in the early 1990s. The earliest bands included Green River, Skin Yard, Screaming Trees ("Nearly Lost You"), and Soundgarden, among others, with most signed to indie rock label Sub Pop. This new style was featured on the 1986 compilation album Deep Six (CZ001) released by C/Z Records, with tracks by Soundgarden, Melvins, Green River, Skin Yard, Malfunkshun and The U-Men. By the late 1980s, several future stars had begun performing, including Nirvana, Alice in Chains, and Mudhoney, while the death of Andrew Wood (d. 1990, buried in Bremerton, Washington) of Mother Love Bone led to that band's disintegration and subsequent reformation as Pearl Jam. In 1991 (see 1991 in music), Nirvana's Nevermind, along with Soundgarden's Badmotorfinger, Pearl Jam's Ten and Alice in Chains' Dirt, quickly brought the grunge scene to the forefront.

Pearl Jam has recorded five No. 1 albums featured on the Billboard Top 200 between 1993 and 2013, including Vs. (1993), and also had a No. 2 Hot 100 hit with their cover of "Last Kiss" in 1999. Nirvana had four No. 1 albums, Alice in Chains had two, Jar of Flies (1994) and their self-titled album (1995), and Soundgarden had one, Superunknown (1994). Later successful grunge acts include Foo Fighters, which had a No. 1 album with Wasting Light (2011).

== Riot grrrl ==
Riot grrrl is a form of punk rock that arose in Olympia in the 1990s with all-female and woman-led acts like Bikini Kill, known for their militant feminism and raw sound. The genre never achieved mainstream success due to an on-going media blackout, along with their harsh criticism of society and often grating musical style, and eventually faded. However, stalwarts Sleater-Kinney stayed together and found themselves approaching mainstream audiences after the turn of the millennium. The movement generated many notable bands, concentrated in the Olympia area and including Bratmobile, Heavens to Betsy, and Excuse 17.

A new wave of the riot grrrl movement continued in the 21st century with bands like NighTrain, The Gossip, The Black Tones and Thee Emergency, which feature soulful vocals, heavy drums, a driving, intense rhythm and guitar.

== Twee pop ==
In the late 1980s, a form of alternative rock called twee pop was popular in the United Kingdom. A small cult following around bands like The Orchids and Heavenly formed in the U.S., centered on Olympia's K Records and the band Beat Happening.

== Hip-hop ==
Arguably the most famous hip-hop star to come out of the state of Washington has been Sir Mix-a-Lot, best known for his songs "Posse on Broadway" and "Baby Got Back", an early nineties novelty hit. Also prominent in the Seattle rap scene at this time was Kid Sensation (Steve Spence), who got his start on Sir Mix-a-Lot's first album, Swass (1988). Wordsayer (Jonathan Moore) was influential in bringing hip hop into Seattle's mainstream with his group Source of Labor. Oldominion (featuring Mr. Hill, Onry Ozzborn and Xperience amongst others), Blue Scholars, THEESatisfaction, Shabazz Palaces, Grayskul and Common Market (featuring RA Scion and Sabzi) are other notable acts. Art of Movement (featuring Jay Park and Cha Cha Malone amongst others) is a notable b-boy crew from Seattle. The Guinness World Records holder for Fastest Rap MC is the Seattle-based NoClue, breaking the record previously held by Chicago rapper Rebel XD. Brown rapped 723 syllables in 51.27 seconds on his track "No Clue" at B&G Studios, Seattle, on January 15, 2005. More recently, local indie rapper/DJ duo Macklemore and Ryan Lewis have achieved worldwide fame with The Heist (2012), scoring two No. 1 Hot 100 hits with "Thrift Shop" and "Can't Hold Us" in 2013. Also, teenage rapper Lil Mosey has grown in popularity since his song "Pull Up," but most notably "Noticed" in 2018, and "Blueberry Faygo" in 2020.

== Origins of notable artists ==
=== Aberdeen ===
- Chris Freeman, queercore (1980s-present)
- Metal Church, heavy/thrash/speed/power metal (1980–1996, 1998–2009, 2012–present)
- Nirvana, grunge (1987–1994)
- Presto Ballet, prog rock (2005–present)

=== Anacortes ===
- Karl Blau, indie rock/country (1996–present)
- D+, indie rock (1996–present)
- Kathi McDonald, blues/R&B/rock (1963–2012)
- Mount Eerie, experimental lo-fi indie rock/folk (2003–present)
- The Lonely Forest, alternative rock (2005–2014)
- Katherine Paul (AKA Black Belt Eagle Scout), Coast Salish traditional/post-rock/alternative rock (2000s-present)

=== Arlington ===
- Kenneth Boulton, classical (1980s-present)

=== Auburn ===
- Bonnie Guitar, country & western/pop (1956–1996)
- Diane Schuur, vocal jazz (1979–present)

=== Bainbridge Island ===
- Jherek Bischoff, indie rock/experimental/alternative rock/neo-classical/indie pop/synth-pop (2000–present)
- Dove Cameron, pop (2007–present)
- Pete Droge, alternative/folk rock (1994–present)
- Andrew Joslyn, neo-classical/experimental music/orchestral pop/hip hop/folk rock/indie rock (2002–present)
- Malfunkshun, glam metal/grunge (1980–1988, 2006–present)

=== Battle Ground ===
- Ceremonial Castings, symphonic black metal (1996–present)
- Zia McCabe, alternative rock/country (1995–present)
- Ruth, Christian/indie rock (2005–present)

=== Bellevue ===
- The Catheters, hard/garage rock (1995–2004, 2013)
- Fifth Angel, heavy/power metal (1983–1990, 2010, 2017–present)
- Queensrÿche, heavy/progressive metal (1980–present)
- Rail, hard rock (1970–present)
- Satisfact, post-punk/new wave revival (1996–2002)

=== Bellingham ===
- ¡All-Time Quarterback!, alternative rock/lo-fi/indie rock (1997–2002)
- Black Eyes & Neckties, horror/hardcore punk (2002–2009)
- Crayon, indie pop/cuddlecore (1990–1994)
- Death Cab for Cutie, indie rock/folk/emo (1997–present)
- Eureka Farm, alternative rock/post-grunge (1996-2000s)
- Glowbug, electronic/dance (2010–present)
- Federation X, alternative rock/pop (1998–present)
- The Ghost and the Grace, indie folk/rock (2009–2010)
- Idiot Pilot, alternative rock/electronic rock/post-hardcore (2003–2011, 2019–present)
- ODESZA, electropop/chillwave (2012–present)
- Mono Men, garage rock/grunge/surf rock (1987–1998, 2006, 2013)
- The Posies, alternative rock/power pop (1986–2021)
- X-15, rock/punk (1979–1987, 1995)
- Your Heart Breaks, indie rock/folk (1998–present)

=== Bremerton ===
- Kane Hodder, melodic hardcore/post-hardcore (2002–2009, 2015)
- Mike Herrera's Tumbledown, cowpunk/alt-country (2007–2014)
- MxPx, Christian/skate punk (1992–present)
- Sango, electronic/hip hop/R&B (2010–present)
- The Sonics, garage rock/proto-punk (1960–present)

=== Camas ===
- Jimmie Rodgers, traditional pop/folk/rock and roll/country & western/adult contemporary (1957–2021)

=== Carrolls ===
- Brian O'Connor, hard rock/garage rock/blues rock/rockabilly/desert rock/boogie rock/alternative rock (2003–present)

=== Centralia ===
- Charlie Albright, classical (2000–present)
- Ann Boleyn, heavy metal/hard rock (1972–present)
- Noah Gundersen and The Courage, acoustic indie folk (2005–present)
- Angela Meade, operatic soprano (2007–present)

=== Chehalis ===
- Ralph Towner, jazz/classical/world/folk (1960s-present)

=== Chelan ===
- Alice Stuart, blues/folk (1960s-present)

=== Chewelah ===
- Allen Stone, blue-eyed soul (2010–present)

=== Colville Indian Reservation ===
- Jim Boyd, Interior Salish traditional music/folk/country/rock/blues (1968–2016)

=== Covington ===
- Tamara Gee, pop (1984–present)

=== Custer ===
- Loretta Lynn, Country & Western/Honky Tonk/Americana/Gospel (1960–present)

=== Edmonds ===
- Danger Radio, indie/pop rock (2003–2011)
- Magnog, post-rock/space rock (1990s, 2011)
- Jay Park, hip hop/R&B/breakdancing (2003–present)

=== Ellensburg ===
- Screaming Trees, grunge/neo-psychedelia (1984–2000)
- Solomon Grundy, psychedelic rock (1989–1991)
- Star Anna, Americana/alt-country (2000s-present)

=== Everett ===
- Stan Boreson, "Scandahoovian" parody music (1949–2007)
- Bus Boyk, western swing (1930s–1990s)
- Mary Lambert, R&B/folk/pop/spoken word (2011–present)
- Kenny Loggins, folk rock/soft rock/kids' music (1968–present)
- The Moondoggies, alt country-rock (2005–present)
- Parenthetical Girls, experimental/chamber pop (2002–2013)
- Jason Webley, folk/experimental/Gypsy punk/folk punk (1990s-present)

=== Federal Way ===
- Amber Pacific, pop-punk/emo (2002–present)
- Sam Kim, R&B/soul/pop/folk/jazz (2013–present)
- Sanjaya Malakar, pop (2006–present)
- Vince Mira, country/rock and roll (2007–present)
- Spluii Numa, punk rock/grunge (1983–1984)

=== Gig Harbor ===
- SixTwoSeven, alternative rock (2016–present)

=== Issaquah ===
- Modest Mouse, indie rock (1992–present)
- SYML, alternative rock/indie pop (2016–present)
- Ugly Casanova, indie rock (1997–2002, 2010)

=== Kelso ===
- Rock n Roll Worship Circus, contemporary Christian (1999–2004)

=== Kenmore ===
- Blake Lewis, electropop/beatboxing/soul (2007–present)
- Telekinesis, indie rock/shoegaze/power pop (2008–present))

=== Kent ===
- Daphne Loves Derby, indie/alternative rock (2001–2015)

=== Kirkland ===
- Neon Blonde, experimental rock/post-hardcore/alternative hip hop (2004–present)

=== Lacey ===
- DJ Dan, funky/electro/tech house (1991–present)

=== Lakewood ===
- Robert Cray, blues/blues rock/soul blues (1974–present)

=== Longview ===
- The Listening, Christian alternative rock (2004–present)
- The Wilde Knights, garage rock (1965–1967)

=== Mercer Island ===
- Bill Anschell, jazz (1982–present)

=== Monroe ===
- Benson Boone, Pop rock/Pop/Alternative Rock (2021–present)

=== Montesano ===
- Melvins, sludge/doom/alternative metal (1983–present)

=== Morton ===
- Brandy Clark, country (2005–present)

=== Mount Vernon ===
- Cheryl Bentyne, vocal jazz/pop (1975–present)

=== Mountlake Terrace ===
- Lil Mosey, hip hop/trap (2016–present)
- Mark O'Connor, country/bluegrass/jazz/classical (1974–present)

=== Mukilteo ===
- The Fall of Troy, mathcore/post-hardcore/math rock/prog rock/screamo (2002–2010, 2013–present)

=== Naselle ===
- Wilho Saari, Finnish folk kantele

=== Olympia ===
- Anna Oxygen, electropop/psychedelic folk (late 1990s-present)
- Bangs, riot grrrl/punk rock (1997–2004, 2010)
- Beat Happening, indie/twee/noise pop/lo-fi (1982–1992)
- Bikini Kill, riot grrrl (1990–1997, 2017, 2019–present)
- The Blow, indie pop/electro/lo-fi (2001–present)
- Bratmobile, riot grrrl/punk rock (1991–1994, 1998–2003)
- Cool Rays, punk rock (1990–1991)
- Dead Air Fresheners, experimental rock/post-punk (1996–present)
- Dub Narcotic Sound System, indie rock (1995–2003)
- Earth, drone metal/psychedelic rock/post-rock (1989–1997, 2003–present)
- Enemymine, noise rock (1998–2000)
- Excuse 17, punk rock/queercore (1993–1995)
- Fitz of Depression, punk rock (1987–1997, 2000, 2002–2019)
- The Fleetwoods, doo wop (1958–1983)
- The Frumpies, lo-fi punk/garage rock (1992–2000)
- G.L.O.S.S., hardcore punk/queercore/D-beat (2014–2016)
- The Go Team, indie rock (1985–1989)
- godheadSilo, noise rock/stoner rock/sludge metal (1991–1998, 2015–present)
- Gun Outfit, indie rock/post-punk/psychedelia (2007–present)
- Heavens to Betsy, riot grrrl/indie rock/punk rock (1991–1994)
- Irving Klaw Trio, experimental rock (1990s)
- LAKE, indie pop (2005–present)
- Love as Laughter, indie rock (1994–2020)
- Lync, post-hardcore/indie rock/emo/lo-fi (1992–1994)
- The Microphones, neofolk/indie rock (1996–2003, 2007, 2019–present)
- Milk Music, punk/indie/alternative rock (2008–present)
- Mirah indie rock/chamber pop/indie pop/experimental pop(1997–present)
- Mocket, alternative rock/post-punk/indie rock (1995–1999)
- The Need, queercore/post-punk/art rock/garage rock/experimental rock (1996–2001, 2010, 2013)
- The Old Haunts, garage/swamp rock (2001–2009)
- Old Time Relijun, noise rock/no wave/art punk/punk blues (1995–present)
- Don Rich, country & western/Bakersfield sound (1959–1974)
- RVIVR, melodic hardcore/pop punk (2008–present)
- Tracy + the Plastics, electropop (2004–present)
- Travis Shook, hard bop/jazz fusion/modal jazz/mainstream jazz/post-bop (1990s-present)
- Sleater-Kinney, riot grrrl/indie rock (1994–2006, 2014–present)
- Team Dresch, queercore/riot grrrl/punk rock (1993–1998, 2004–present)
- Viva Knievel, punk rock (1989–1990)
- Wolves in the Throne Room, atmospheric black metal (2002–present)

=== Pullman ===
- Tyson Motsenbocker, Christian alternative rock/indie folk/folk rock (2010–present)

=== Ravensdale ===
- Brandi Carlile, Americana/alt-country/folk rock (2004–present)

=== Redmond ===
- The Blood Brothers, post-hardcore/ screamo/art punk (1997–2007, 2014)
- Cody Votolato, folk/alt-country/indie rock (1995–present)

=== Sammamish ===
- Surf Mesa, electronic pop (2019–present)

=== Seattle ===
- 10 Minute Warning, hardcore punk (1982–1984, 1997–1998)
- 3rd Secret, alternative rock/folk rock/grunge (2022–present)
- 7 Horns 7 Eyes, Christian melodic death metal (2006–present)
- 7 Year Bitch, riot grrrl (1990–1997)
- 764-HERO, indie rock/emo (1995–2002, 2012, 2016)
- A Frames, post-punk/noise rock (1999–2010)
- Abney Park, steampunk/world/industrial dance/dark wave (1997–present)
- Abyssinian Creole, Northwest hip hop (2001–present)
- Acceptance, pop-punk (1998–2006, 2015–present)
- The Accüsed, crossover thrash/hardcore punk (1981–1992, 2003–present)
- Clarence Acox Jr., jazz (1971–present)
- Aiden, horror punk/post-hardcore/emo (2003–2012, 2015–2016)
- Akimbo, hardcore punk (1998–2012)
- Alice in Chains, grunge/hard rock (1987–2002, 2005–present)
- Alice N' Chains, glam/heavy/speed metal (1986–1987)
- Brent Amaker and the Rodeo, country & western (2005–present)
- Aqueduct, indie pop (2003–2015)
- Art of Movement, b-boy crew (2002–present)
- Artis the Spoonman, rock/folk busker
- Arthur & Yu, indie folk (2006–present)
- Assemblage 23, futurepop/electro-industrial/synth-pop (1988–present)
- Asva, drone/doom metal (2003–present)
- "Awesome", cabaret (2003–present)
- Baby Gramps, folk/country/Americana/blues (1964–present)
- Caspar Babypants (Chris Ballew), kids' music (2009–present)
- Band of Horses, indie rock/Southern rock/power pop/folk rock (2004–present)
- Barcelona, indie rock (2005–present)
- The Beakers, art punk/post-punk/new wave (1980–1981)
- Tina Bell, grunge/punk rock (1983–1990)
- Bell Witch, funeral doom metal (2010–present)
- Anomie Belle, avant-garde (2008–present)
- The Bergevin Brothers, political jazz (2008–present)
- Big Band Garage Orchestra, punk jazz (2001–2006)
- Big Business, heavy metal/sludge metal/stoner rock (2004–present)
- Alyse Black, rock/pop/jazz/folk pop (2007–present)
- Black Cat Orchestra, classical/world/film score (1991–2004)
- Nissim Black (D.Black), conscious/hardcore/Jewish hip hop (1999–present)
- The Blackouts, punk rock/post-punk/hard rock (1979–1985)
- Robert "Bumps" Blackwell, jazz/rock and roll/pop/R&B/Funk (1947–1981)
- The Blakes, indie rock (2001–present)
- Blenderhead, punk rock (1992–2001, 2016–present)
- Blood Circus, sludge metal/grunge (1988–1989, 2992. 2007)
- Erik Blood, hip hop/rock 2000s-present)
- Bloodgood, Christian/glam metal (1984–1994, 2006–present)
- Blue Scholars, northwest hip hop/alternative hip hop (2002–present)
- BOAT, indie rock (2004–present)
- William Bolcom, contemporary classical/traditional pop/parlour/cabaret/ragtime (1950s-present)
- Patti Bown, jazz (1940s–2000s)
- Brad, alternative rock/grunge/neo-psychedelia (1992–present)
- The Briefs, punk rock (2000–present)
- Brite Futures, indie rock/electronica (2005–2013)
- The Brothers Four, folk pop (1957–present)
- Budo, hip hop (2004–present)
- Burning Witch, doom/sludge/drone metal (1995–1998)
- Calm Down Juanita, alternative/psychedelic rock (1998–2002)
- Candlebox, grunge/post-grunge (1990–2000, 2006–present)
- Cardiknox, indie pop/dance (2013–2018)
- Cat Butt, alternative rock/grunge (1987–1990)
- The Catch, alternative pop (2000s)
- Buddy Catlett, jazz (1940s–2000s)
- The Cave Singers, indie rock/folk (2007–present)
- Champion, straight edge hardcore punk/melodic hardcore (1999–2006)
- Childbirth, garage/alternative/punk rock (2013–present)
- Chinas Comidas, art punk/post-punk/no wave (1977–1980)
- Choral Arts, choral/a cappella/classical/contemporary classical (1993–present)
- Christ Analogue, electronic/industrial rock (1995–1998, 2003–2004)
- Circus Contraption, dark cabaret/vaudeville (1998–2009)
- Class of '99, alternative rock (1998)
- The Classic Crime, alternative rock/post-grunge/post-hardcore/pop punk (2004–present)
- Climax Golden Twins, experimental music (1993–present)
- Coffin Break, hardcore punk/grunge (1987–1994, 2007–present)
- Tom Collier, jazz/classical/pop (1950s-present)
- Common Market, Northwest hip hop (2005–2009, 2019–present)
- Roxy Coss, jazz (2000s-present]
- Critters Buggin, instrumental rock/jazz/funk/punk/ambient/electronic (1993–present)
- Culprit, heavy metal (1982–1985, 2010–present)
- Cuong Vu, jazz (1994–present)
- The Daily Flash, folk/psychedelic rock (1965–1968, 2002–present)
- Ray Dalton, hip hop/gospel/R&B/pop (2011–present)
- The Dark Fantastic, hard/desert/psychedelic/indie rock (1997–2001)
- Dark Time Sunshine, alternative/indie hip hop (2009–present)
- Dead Low Tide, garage rock (2001–2003)
- The Dead Science, experimental pop (1999–present)
- Dear John Letters, alternative rock/indie rock/emo (2000–present)
- Deep Sea Diver, pop rock (2009–present)
- Demon Hunter, Christian/metalcore/nu/alternative/groove metal (2000–present)
- Peter DePoe (aka Last Walking Bear), funk rock/swamp rock/soul/R&B/Native American traditional (1960s-present)
- Devilhead, alternative rock/post-grunge (1993–1998)
- Diagram of Suburban Chaos, electronic music (1997–present)
- Dickless, riot grrrl/grunge/punk rock/funk punk (1989–1998)
- The Divorce, indie rock (2002–2007, 2011)
- Dolour, pop/power/baroque|/chamber pop (1997–2007, 2020–present)
- Doll Squad, alternative rock/power pop (1987–1989, 2008–present)
- Taime Downe, hard rock/glam metal/industrial rock/gothic rock (1985–present)
- Sammy Drain, blues/rock/R&B (1960s–2016)
- Dude York, alternative rock (2012–present)
- Dust Moth, metalgaze (2013–present)
- The Dutchess and the Duke, indie folk (2008–2010, 2014–2015)
- Shelby Earl, indie rock (2005–present)
- Jack Endino, grunge/alternative rock/hardcore punk/heavy metal/doom metal (1985–present)
- Fair, alternative rock/emo pop (2005–2012)
- Faith & Disease, ethereal wave/dark wave/slowcore/shoegaze/dream pop/new-age (1994–2006)
- The Fartz, hardcore punk (1981–1983, 1999–2003)
- Fastbacks, punk rock (1979–2002, 2011, 2018)
- Fences, pop/alternative/indie rock (2010–present)
- The Fire Theft, prog/hard/art rock (2001–2004)
- Fleet Foxes, folk rock/chamber pop (2006–2013, 2016–present)
- Flop, grunge/power pop/punk rock (1990–1995)
- Foo Fighters, post-grunge/hard rock (1994–present)
- Forced Entry, thrash/progressive metal (1983–1995, 2002, 2020–present)
- Forgive Durden indie rock/post-hardcore/emo (2003–2010, 2013)
- The Frantics, rock and roll (1950s–1960s)
- David Friesen, jazz (1960s-present)
- The Gallahads, doo wop (1952–1962)
- Gas Huffer, garage rock/punk blues/garage punk/grunge (1989–2006)
- Gatsbys American Dream, indie rock (2001–2006, 2010–2012, 2020–present)
- Tim Gemmill, jazz/post-bop/avant-garde jazz/jazz fusion/techno (1967–present)
- The Gentlemen, pop rock (1998–1999. 2000–2001)
- Elmer Gill, jazz (1940s–2004)
- Girl On Fire, hard rock (2007–2015)
- The Girls, pop punk/glam punk/new wave (early-2000s-present)
- The Gits, punk rock (1986–1993)
- Goodness, alternative rock (1994–2005)
- Grand Archives, indie rock (2006–2012)
- Grammatrain, alternative rock/post-grunge/grunge/Christian rock (1994–1998, 2009–present)
- Grand Hallway, indie folk/chamber pop/art rock (2007–present)
- Natalie Grant, contemporary Christian (1999–present)
- Grave Babies, Gothic rock/dark wave/noise rock/lo-fi (2000–present)
- Grayskul, alternative/Northwest hip hop (2003–present)
- Green Apple Quick Step, alternative rock/post-grunge/psychedelic rock (1992–1998. 2009–present)
- The Green Pajamas neo-psychedelia/indie rock/Paisley Underground/jangle pop (1984–present)
- Green River, grunge/punk rock/heavy metal/garage rock (1984–1988, 1993, 2008–2009, 2018)
- Grieves, hip hop (2007–present)
- Gruntruck, grunge/heavy metal/alternative metal (1989–1993, 1996–2002, 2017–present)
- Ivar Haglund, folk (1920s–1980s)
- Hammerbox, alternative rock/grunge (1990–1994, 2004)
- Randy Hansen, psychedelic/blues rock/Jimi Hendrix tribute (1972–present)
- Harvey Danger, alternative rock (1992–2001, 2004–2009)
- Hater, alternative metal/grunge/hard rock (1993–1997, 2005, 2008)
- The Head and the Heart, indie folk/folk rock (2009–present)
- Headphones, indietronica/synth-pop (2005–2006)
- Heart, hard rock/pop rock (1967–1998, 2002–2016, 2019–present)
- Heir Apparent, heavy/power/progressive metal (1983–1989, 2000–2019)
- Heiress, sludge metal/post-metal (2006–present)
- Hell's Belles, hard rock (2000–present)
- Helms Alee, sludge metal/noise rock/post-hardcore (2007–present)
- Jimi Hendrix, psychedelic rock/blues rock (1963–1970)
- Hey Marseilles, folk rock/chamber pop (2006–present)
- Hibou, dream pop, (2013–present)
- Himsa, metalcore/melodic death metal (1998–2008, 2017–present)
- Hobosexual, indie/experimental/alternative/garage rock (2009–present)
- Ron Holden, R&B/pop/rock and roll (1958–1997)
- Hovercraft, experimental/noise/space/post-rock (1993–2001)
- I Declare War, deathcore (2005–present)
- The Intelligence post-punk/garage rock/garage punk (1999–present)
- Ivan & Alyosha, indie pop/rock (2007–present)
- Jake One, Northwest hip hop/trap (1992–present)
- Ayron Jones, blues/grunge/rock/soul (2005–present)
- Quincy Jones, jazz/big band swing/R&B/soul/funk/bossa nova/hip hop/pop/disco (1951–present)
- Juned, pop rock (1993–1996)
- Juno, indie rock/post-punk/post-hardcore/shoegaze/electronic (1995–2003, 2006)
- Damien Jurado, indie rock (1995–present)
- Kay Kay and His Weathered Underground, indie rock/psychedelic pop/jazz (2005–2013)
- Kenny G, smooth jazz (1973–present)
- Kid Sensation (now Xola Malik), old skool hip hop/rap (1987–1996, 2009–present)
- Kill Switch...Klick, industrial rock (1991–present)
- Kings Kaleidoscope, contemporary worship/Christian rock/art rock/chamber pop/progressive pop (2011–present)
- Kinski, post-rock/noise rock/instrumental rock (1998–present)
- Kiss It Goodbye, metalcore/hardcore punk (1996–1998, 2012)
- Kultur Shock, Gypsy punk/alternative metal (1996–present)
- La Luz, surf noir/doo wop/neo-psychedelia (2013–present)
- Leah LaBelle, pop/R&B/soul (2004–2018)
- LAND, jazz/world/rock/electronic (1993–2001)
- The Lashes, power pop (2000–2008)
- Lavender Country, country/Americana (1972–1976, 1999–2000, 2014–present)
- Legion Within, dark wave/gothic rock/industrial rock (2000–present)
- The Lemons, post-grunge/pop-punk/thrash metal (1991–1996)
- Dave Lewis, R&B (1957–1969)
- Peter Scott Lewis, contemporary classical (1980s-present)
- Ryan Lewis (born in Spokane, Washington), alternative hip hop/progressive rap/pop rap/hipster hop (2006–present)
- Limp Richerds, hardcore punk/noise rock/grunge (1981–1987)
- Little Champions, indie rock (1996–present)
- Living Daylights, jazz-jamband (1995–present)
- Loaded, hard rock/punk rock (1999–2002, 2006–present)
- The Long Winters, indie rock (2001–present)
- Love Battery, alternative rock/grunge/psychedelic rock (1989–2002, 2006, 2011–2013)
- Macklemore, alternative hip hop/progressive rap/pop rap/hipster hop (2000–present)
- Mad Rad, hipster hop/electronic (2007–2010)
- Mad Season, alternative rock/grunge (1994–1996)
- The Magic Magicians, indie rock (2000–present)
- Maktub, jazz fusion/prog rock (1996–present)
- The Maldives, alt-country/country rock (2002–present)
- Mamiffer, post-rock/ambient/experimental rock/drone ((2007–present)
- Manooghi Hi, prog rock (2007–present)
- Briana Marela, indie rock (2010–present)
- Massive Monkees, b-boy crew
- Math and Physics Club, indie pop/twee pop (2004–present)
- Duff McKagan, hard/punk rock (1979–present)
- The Mentors, shock rock/heavy/thrash metal (1976–1996, 2001–present)
- Mateo Messina, classical/film score (1995–present)
- Emi Meyer, jazz (2007–present)
- Vic Meyers, jazz (1910s–1930s)
- Mico de Noche, sludge metal (2001–present)
- Minus the Bear, math/experimental/prog rock (2001–2018)
- The Missionary Position, hard rock/blues/funk (2009–present)
- Mistrust, heavy metal (1984–1988)
- Jonathan Moore (Wordsayer), Northwest hip hop (1992–2017)
- Pamela Moore, hard rock/heavy metal (1981–present)
- Mother Love Bone, grunge/glam punk (1988–1990)
- Mr. Hill, alternative/Northwest hip hop (1999–present)
- Mt. St. Helens Vietnam Band, indie/alternative rock (2008–present)
- Mudhoney, alternative rock/grunge/garage punk (1988–present)
- The Murder City Devils, horror/garage punk (1996–2001, 2006–present)
- My Sister's Machine, hard rock/grunge/heavy metal/alternative metal (1989–1994, 2010–2011)
- The Myriad, indie/alternative rock (2002–2009)
- Nacho Picasso, hip hop (2010–present)
- Naked Giants, rock and roll/psychedelic rock/grunge/post-punk/lo-fi (2014–present)
- Narrows, mathcore/hardcore punk/post-hardcore/sludge metal (2008–present)
- Nerve Filter, electronic (1995–present)
- Nevada Bachelors, alternative/indie/pop rock (1997–2001)
- Nevermore, heavy/progressive/thrash/power metal (1991–2001)
- New American Shame, hard rock (1998–2001, 2010–present)
- Night Beats, garage rock/psychedelic rock/soul/surf rock (2009–present)
- Nightcaps, lounge/pop/jazz/torch/soul/garage rock (1994–present)
- The No WTO Combo, hardcore punk/spoken word (1999)
- NoClue, West Coast/Northwest hip hop (2004–present)
- Oldominion alternative/Northwest hip hop (1999–present)
- On the Last Day, post-hardcore/alternative rock/emo/screamo (2003–2009)
- Onry Ozzborn, alternative/Northwest hip hop (1997–present)
- Orcas, dream pop/ambient pop/electronic (2012–present)
- Orkestar RTW, Balkan/folk (1987–present)
- Sean Osborn, classical/chamber (1980s-present)
- Pacific Gold, contemporary Christian/folk rock/indie rock (2012–present)
- Jim Page, folk busker
- The Pale Pacific, indie rock/power pop (1994–present)
- Aaron Parks, jazz (1999–present)
- Past Lives, post-punk/experimental rock/post-hardcore (2007–present)
- Pearl Jam, grunge/alternative rock/hard rock (1990–present)
- Pedro the Lion, indie rock/slowcore/emo (1995–2006, 2017–present)
- Perfume Genius, art/baroque/indie/chamber pop (2008–present)
- Perkins Coie Band, rock and roll/garage rock (1999–present)
- Pickwick, indie rock/garage rock/R&B (2008–present)
- Pigeonhed, funk/soul/trip hop/lo-fi (1993–1997, 2010–2019)
- Pleaseeasaur, camp musical comedy (1997–2009)
- Pollens, indie rock (2008–present)
- Ponga, jazz improv (1997–2001)
- Pony Time, garage rock/punk rock (2009–present)
- Poor Moon, indie folk/pop (2012–present)
- The Postal Service, indietronica/indie pop/synth-pop (2001–2005, 2013)
- Posse, indie rock (2010–2017)
- The presidents of the United States of America, alternative rock/pop-punk/post-grunge (1993–1998, 2002–2015)
- Pretty Girls Make Graves, post-punk/indie rock/emo (2001–2007)
- The Prom, indie rock (1999–present)
- Psychic Emperor, indie rock/electronic (2004–present)
- Q5, hard rock/heavy metal (1983–1989,:2014–present)
- RA Scion, alternative/Northwest hip hop (2002–present)
- Raft of Dead Monkeys, Christian punk/hardcore punk/noise rock (1999–2001, 2004)
- Raz Simone (Razpy), hip hop/trap (2014–present)
- Red Stars Theory, indie rock/post-rock/slowcore (1995–2000)
- Melissa Reese, hard rock/heavy metal/glam metal/alternative rock/alternative metal/electronica/experimental rock/punk rock (2006–present)
- Reignwolf, indie rock/blues rock (2011–present)
- Reverend, thrash/speed/power metal (1989–1993, 2000–2010)
- The Revolutionary Hydra, indie rock (1997–2003)
- Roadside Monument, instrumental math rock/emo (1994–1998, 2002–2003)
- The Rockfords, alternative rock (1999–2003)
- Room Nine, alternative/psychedelic rock (1980–1988)
- Rose Blossom Punch, post-grunge/alternative rock (1995–1999)
- Loni Rose, pop (1993–present)
- Rose Windows, psychedelic/experimental rock (2010–2015)
- The Rumba Kings, world/Latin (2015–present)
- Merrilee Rush, pop/rock and roll/R&B (1960–present)
- Sabzi, alternative/indie hip hop (2002–present)
- Sanctuary, thrash/power metal (1985–1992, 2010–present)
- Sandrider, grunge/hard rock/sludge metal (2008–present)
- Satchel, grunge (1991–2019)
- The Saturday Knights, hip hop/indie rock/pop (2007–present)
- The Scene Aesthetic, indie/folk/country pop (2005–2012)
- Schoolyard Heroes, horror punk/alternative rock/gothic rock/shock rock (1999–2009)
- scntfc, EDM/hip hop/rock (2000s-present)
- Marc Seales, jazz/post-bop (1990s-present)
- Seapony, indie pop (2010–2015, 2017)
- Seattle Chamber Players, chamber (1989–present)
- Seattle Girls Choir, choral (1982–present)
- Seattle Opera, opera company (1963–present)
- Seattle Pro Musica, choral/a cappella/classical/contemporary classical (1972–present)
- Seattle Symphony, classical/contemporary classical (1903–present)
- Second Coming, industrial dance/post-grunge/hard rock/alternative rock (1990–2008)
- Shabazz Palaces, experimental/alternative hip hop (2009–present)
- Sharks Keep Moving, math/indie rock (1997–2002)
- Shoplifting, punk rock (2002–2006)
- Sicko, pop-punk (1991–2001, 2018–present)
- The Sight Below, ambient/techno/shoegaze/electronic (2008–present)
- Sir Mix-a-Lot, old skool hip hop/West Coast hip hop/party rap/pop-rap (1981–present)
- Sirens Sister, alternative rock (2006–present)
- Skerik, jazz/saxophonics/punk jazz (1980s-present)
- Skin Yard, grunge/alternative metal (1985–1992)
- Sky Cries Mary, psychedelic rock/trance/industrial/space rock (1988–1999, 2004–2009, 2013–present)
- Sledgeback, punk rock/Oi! (2004–present)
- Slender Means, indie rock (2003–2010)
- Sleze, glam metal (1984–1987)
- Smoosh (now Chaos Chaos), indie/synth/baroque/twee pop (2000–present)
- SMP, industrial rock (1992–present)
- Soiled Doves, post-hardcore/art punk/screamo/experimental rock (2000–2001)
- Sol (Solzilla), Northwest hip hop (2008–present)
- Solger, hardcore punk (1980–1982)
- Soulbender, alternative metal/hard rock (2002–2014)
- Soundgarden grunge/heavy alternative metal/hard rock (1984–1997, 2010–2019)
- Source of Labor, Northwest hip hop (1989–2004)
- Spys4Darwin, alternative metal/hard rock (2001–2002)
- The Squirrels, novelty bubblegum pop-punk (1984–2009, 2017–present)
- Floyd Standifer, jazz (1946-2000s)
- Sunn O))), drone/doom/experimental/black metal (1998–present)
- Sunny Day Real Estate, emo/indie rock/post-grunge/post-hardcore (1992–1995, 1997–2001, 2009–2014, 2022–present)
- Super Deluxe, punk pop (1993–2005)
- Sweet 75, alternative rock (1994–2000)
- Sweet Water alternative rock/punk rock/new wave/grunge/hard rock (1990–1999, 2007–present)
- Tad, grunge/alternative metal/sludge metal/noise rock (1988–1999)
- Tangerine, indie pop/dream pop/indie rock/garage rock revival (2014–present)
- Tattle Tale, folk punk/indie rock (1992–1995)
- Tea Cozies, garage rock (2005–2012)
- Teen Angels, grunge (1990s)
- The Tempers, synth-pop/glam rock/art rock/dark cabaret (2006–present)
- Temple of the Dog, grunge/alternative rock (1990–1992, 2003, 2009, 2011, 2014–2016, 2019)
- Gabriel Teodros, Northwest hip hop (1999–present)
- These Arms Are Snakes, post-hardcore/alternative metal (2002–2009, 2016, 2021)
- This Busy Monster, indie rock (1992–2001)
- This Providence, alternative rock/indie rock/pop-punk/emo (2003–2013)
- Jennifer Thomas, classical/crossover/new-age (1990s-present)
- Thorr's Hammer, death-doom (1994–1995, 2009–2010)
- Thrones, doom metal/avant-garde/noise rock/experimental rock (1994–present)
- Throw Me the Statue, indie pop (2005–2013)
- Thunderpussy, hard/blues rock (2014–present)
- Tiny Vipers, indie rock (2006–present)
- The Tiptons Sax Quartet, jazz (1990s-present)
- TKO, hard rock/heavy metal (1977–1986, 1994, 1997, 2001, 2018)
- Total Experience Gospel Choir, gospel (1973–present)
- Trachtenburg Family Slideshow Players, anti-folk/indie rock/art pop (2000–2011)
- Trial, hardcore punk (1995–2000, 2005, 2009, 2011)
- The Tripwires, power pop/pub rock (2006–present)
- Truly, grunge/psychedelic rock/alternative rock (1990–1998, 2008–present)
- Tuatara, instrumental world/folk (1996–present)
- Tullycraft, indie pop/twee pop/cuddlecore (1995–present)
- The Turn-Ons, alternative rock (1997–2008)
- The U-Men, grunge/punk rock/post-punk/garage rock/noise rock (1980–1989)
- Uncle Bonsai, acoustic contemporary folk (1981–1988, 1999–present)
- Undertow, hardcore punk/metalcore (1991–2004)
- Unified Theory, alternative rock/post-grunge (1998–2001)
- United State of Electronica, electronic rock (2002–present)
- Unwed Sailor, instrumental rock/ambient/post-rock (1998–present)
- Vells, indie rock (2001–present)
- Vendetta Red, alternative rock/screamo/emo/post-grunge/post-hardcore (1998–2006, 2010–present)
- Visqueen, pop-punk/power pop/indie rock (2001–2011)
- Walt Wagner, lounge/pop/classical/rock and roll (1960–2017)
- Frank Waldron, jazz (1910s–1950s)
- The Walkabouts, indie rock/alt-country/folk rock/chamber pop/slowcore (1984–2015)
- Walking Papers, alternative rock (2013–present)
- War Babies, hard rock/glam metal (1998–1993)
- Waxwing, emo/indie rock (1996–2005)
- Harold Weeks, jazz/ragtime (1910s–1967)
- Wellwater Conspiracy, alternative rock/garage rock/neo-psychedelia/space rock (1993–2004)
- Western State Hurricanes, indie rock (1997–1999)
- Whangdoodle Entertainers, jazz/ragtime (1907–1925)
- White, prog rock (2005–2022)
- Willard, grunge/sludge metal/heavy metal/alternative metal (1989–1995, 2018)
- William Control (Wil Francis), dark wave/synth-pop/gothic rock (2008–2017, 2020)
- Dick Wilson, jazz (1930–1941)
- Wimps, punk rock (2012–present)
- Wizdom, Northwest hip hop (2008–present)
- Wonderful, dream pop (1999–present)
- Xperience, alternative hip hop (2004–present)
- The Young Fresh Fellows, alternative rock (1981–present)
- Zeke, hardcore punk/hard rock/heavy metal (1992–present)
- Zipgun, punk rock (1991–1994)

=== Sequim ===
- Bailey Bryan, pop/R&B/country (2016–present)

=== Snohomish ===
- Megs McLean, country rock/grunge/"crunge" (2015–present)

=== Spokane ===
- Cami Bradley, folk/pop (2013–present)
- Michael Clarke, folk/country rock (1964–1993)
- Bing Crosby, traditional pop/vocal jazz (1922–1977)
- Bob Crosby, jazz/big band swing/dixieland (1931–1993)
- Enterprise Earth, deathcore (2014–present)
- Thomas Hampson, opera/romantic/chamber/show tunes (1980–present)
- Myles Kennedy, alternative metal/blues rock/hard rock/jazz (1988–present)
- The Makers, garage rock (1991–present)
- The Chad Mitchell Trio, folk (1958–1967, 1987, 2005–2014)
- Patrice Munsel, opera/show tunes (1943–2008)
- Jimmy Rowles, jazz/swing/cool jazz (1940s–1980s)
- Spokane Symphony, classical (1945–present)
- Telecast, Christian rock (2003–2008)
- Too Slim and the Taildraggers, blues rock (1986–present)
- Tyrone Wells, folk pop (2000–present)
- Merrill Womach, gospel (1960–1985)

=== Stanwood ===
- Bundle of Hiss, hard rock/grunge/heavy metal (1980–1988)

=== Tacoma ===
- Botch, mathcore/metalcore (1993–2002)
- Neko Case, indie rock/alt-country/folk rock/Americana (1994–present)
- Corky Corcoran, jazz (1940–1979)
- Girl Trouble, garage rock (1983–present)
- Donald Glaude, house (1992–present)
- Harkonen, post-hardcore (1997–2005)
- He is We, indie pop (2008–present)
- Junkyard Jane, Americana/"Swampabilly" (1997–present)
- Liar's Club, melodic pop (1989–1995, 2013)
- Vicci Martinez, pop/rock (2000–present)
- Jerry Miller, psychedelic rock/folk rock (1959–present)
- Motopony, indie/alternative rock (2008–present)
- Ronny Munroe, heavy metal/thrash metal/prog metal/hard rock (1986–present)
- Roald Reitan, opera (1957-1970s)
- Roy, folk/indie rock (2002–2006, 2010)
- Seaweed, punk rock/alternative rock/post-hardcore (1989–1999, 2007–2014)
- Some By Sea, baroque pop/symphonic rock (2002–2006)
- The Ventures, instrumental rock/surf rock (1958–present)
- Versing, alternative rock/indie rock/shoegaze (2015–present)
- The [Fabulous] Wailers, garage rock/R&B (1958–1969)
- Jaime Wyatt, outlaw country/Americana (2002–present)
- Yogi Yorgesson, traditional pop parody music (1927–1941)

=== Tenino ===
- Adam Craig, country (2004–present)

=== Tri-Cities ===
- Larry Coryell, jazz fusion/free jazz/pop/rock/classical (1965–2017)
- Gosling (formerly Loudermilk), hard/alternative rock (1995–2006)
- Kristine W, dance/house/electronica/jazz (1985–present)
- James Otto, country (2002–present)
- Michael Peterson, country (1986–present)

=== Tumwater ===
- Karp, post-hardcore (1990–1998)
- Survival Knife, post-hardcore (2011–2015)
- Unwound, post-hardcore/noise rock/experimental rock (1991–2002)

=== Vancouver WA ===
- Jeff Lorber, smooth jazz/jazz fusion (1975–present)

=== Vashon ===
- The Pharmacy, psychedelic/indie rock (2002–present)
- Poor Old Lu, Christian alternative rock/pop punk (1990–2002, 2011, 2013, 2014)
- Sumac, post-metal/sludge metal (2014–present)

=== Wahkiakum County ===
- Giants in the Trees, alternative rock (2017–present)

=== Walla Walla ===
- Chastity Belt, alternative rock/rock and roll/noise pop/pop rock (2010–present)
- Evelyn Evelyn, baroque pop/Americana/dark cabaret (2007–2012)

=== Wenatchee ===
- The Chargers, garage rock (1966–1969)
- Dan Hamilton, surf rock (1963–1994)
- Judd Hamilton, surf rock/country (1961–present)
- Don Lanphere, jazz (1947–2003)

=== Yakima ===
- Oleta Adams, gospel/pop rock/soul/R&B/jazz (1980–present)
- Gary Peacock, jazz/avant-garde jazz/free jazz (1956–2020)
- The Velvet Illusions, garage rock (1965–1967)

(Note: years active are as of July 23, 2022 and are in some cases approximate)

== See also ==
- Hip-hop music in the Pacific Northwest
- Indigenous music of North America#Northwest Coast
- Museum of Pop Culture
- Music of Seattle
- List of songs about Seattle
- List of musicians from Seattle
- Music of Olympia, Washington
- Music of the Pacific Northwest
