= Music of Washington =

Music of Washington may refer to:

- Music of Washington (state)
- Music of Washington, D.C.
