= Clarence Acox Jr. =

American band director and jazz drummer

Clarence Acox
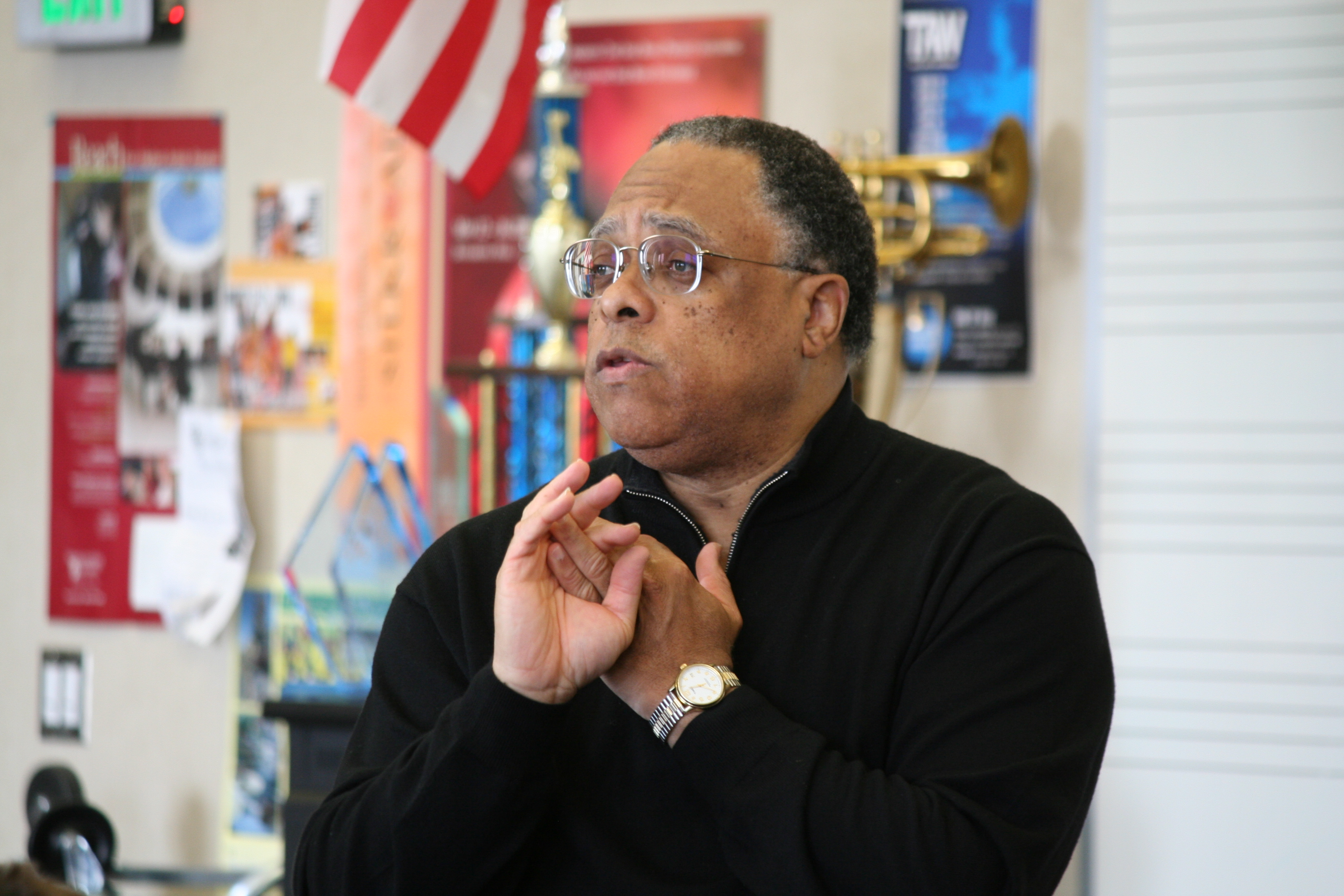
- Acox in 2014

Background information
- Born: October 1947 (age 78–79)
- Origin: New Orleans, Louisiana
- Genre: Jazz
- Occupations: Band director, jazz drummer
- Instruments: Drums, Piano

Clarence Acox is an American band director and jazz drummer. He is a native of New Orleans, and has been heard in a variety of settings in the Pacific Northwest.

He is the former director of jazz bands at Garfield High School, where he has taught since arriving from Southern University in Baton Rouge in 1971, initially hired to rejuvenate the school's marching bands. Under his tutelage since 1979, the Garfield Jazz Ensemble has won every major competition on the West Coast, including competitions in Nevada, California, Oregon, Idaho, and Washington. He retired from Garfield High School in June, 2019.

Acox was named Educator of the Year by Down Beat magazine in 2001. In 2004 the Seattle Music Educators Association recognized him as its Outstanding Music Educator. In 2007 he was presented the Mayor's Arts Award by Seattle mayor Greg Nickels. In 2008 Seattle Metropolitan magazine named him one of the 50 most influential musicians in the history of Seattle music. In 2010, he and Roosevelt High School's Scott Brown shared the Impact Award at Seattle's second annual City of Music Awards. In May 2016 Acox was awarded an Honorary Doctorate in Fine Arts from Cornish College of the Arts.

Acox is a regular on the club scene in the Seattle area. He has performed with the Floyd Standifer Quartet (now Legacy Quartet) at the New Orleans Creole Restaurant since 1986. His drum style also drives the Seattle Repertory Jazz Orchestra, which he co-founded in 1995 with University of Washington saxophone instructor Michael Brockman.
