= Roald Reitan =

American opera singer

Roald Reitan (11 November 1928 – 21 February 2011) was an American operatic baritone who had an active international career from the 1950s through the 1970s.

== Life and career ==
Born in Tacoma, Washington, Reitan graduated from Stadium High School in 1946. He then studied voice at the University of Puget Sound while simultaneously working for an appliance store. He began his career with the San Francisco Opera, making his professional debut as the First Officer in Dialogues of the Carmelites in 1957.

In 1959 Reitan won the Metropolitan Opera National Council Auditions, and was pictured in LIFE magazine's coverage of the event in its 6 April 1959 issue. He was offered a contract at the Met, making his debut with the company in October 1959 as the Gypsy in Il trovatore under conductor Fausto Cleva. He made 250 appearances at the Met between 1959 and 1963, portraying mainly small to mid size roles like Baron Douphol in La traviata, Frank in Die Fledermaus, the Herald in Otello, Jago in Ernani, the Jailer in Tosca, Jim Larkens in La fanciulla del West, Mandarin in Turandot, Masetto in Don Giovanni, Roucher in Andrea Chénier, Schaunard in La bohème, Silvano in Un ballo in maschera, Silvio in Pagliacci, Wagner in Faust, the Wigmaker in Ariadne auf Naxos, and Yamadori in Madama Butterfly. However, he did appear in several performances of one major role at the Met, Figaro in The Barber of Seville opposite Jeanette Scovotti's Rosina. His last appearance with the company was as Ortel in Die Meistersinger von Nürnberg on May 22, 1963. Reitan was singing the role of the Surgeon in La forza del destino on March 4, 1960, and was on stage with Leonard Warren when the latter collapsed and died during the performance.

Reitan created the leading role of the Roman Soldier in the world premiere of George Thaddeus Jones's Easter television opera Break of Day which was broadcast nationally on ABC on April 3, 1961. From 1964 until 1967 he was a resident artist at the Deutsche Oper Berlin. In 1973 he was the soloist in the world premiere of Leroy Ostransky's Songs for Julia with the Seattle Symphony under conductor Milton Katims.

He died of lung cancer in Tacoma at the age of 82.
