= Karen P. Thomas =

American conductor

Karen P. Thomas (born 1957), composer and conductor, is the Artistic Director and Conductor of Seattle Pro Musica and Director of Music at University Unitarian Church. With Seattle Pro Musica she has produced six CD recordings, and has received the Margaret Hillis Award for Choral Excellence and the ASCAP-Chorus America Award for Adventuresome Programming of Contemporary Music. Ms. Thomas has guest conducted at international festivals in Europe and North America, and has served on the boards of the American Choral Director's Association for Washington State, the Conductor's Guild, the League-ISCM and the International Alliance for Women in Music. Ms. Thomas is a recipient of grants and awards from the National Endowment for the Arts, American Academy and Institute of Arts and Letters, and ASCAP, among others. Her compositions have been awarded prizes in various competitions, and her commissions include works for the Grand Jubilee 2000 in Rome, the American Guild of Organists, and the Goodwill Arts Festival. Her compositions are regularly performed internationally, by groups such as The Hilliard Ensemble, and have been praised as "superb work of the utmost sensitivity and beauty." Her conducting has received critical praise for its "integrity and high purpose...delivered with taste and impeccable musicianship."

== Awards and Fellowships ==
- Margaret Hillis Award for Choral Excellence
- Seattle Arts Commission Seattle Artists Award
- Distinguished Alumna Award - Cornish College of the Arts
- His Majestie's Clerkes Choral Composition Competition
- ASCAP-Chorus America Award for Adventurous Programming of Contemporary Music
- Artist Trust GAP Grant
- Oregon Bach Festival Composition Fellow
- Chorus of Westerly Conducting Fellow
- Delius Composition Contest First Place
- National Association of College Wind and Percussion Instructors Composition Contest
- Dorland Mountain Arts Colony Composition Fellow
- Washington State Arts Commission Artist Fellowship Award
- Melodious Accord Composition Contest
- King County Arts Commission Individual Artist Grant
- National Endowment for the Arts Challenge III Grant (Goodwill Arts Festival co-recipient)
- New Langton Arts (co-recipient)
- Artist Trust Fellowship
- Northwest Chamber Orchestra Composers Forum Award
- American Academy and Institute of Arts and Letters Charles E. Ives Scholar
- Brechemin Foundation Scholar
- International League of Women Composers' Third Annual Search for New Music

== Selected Conducting Performances ==
- Bergen International Festival
- Goodwill Arts Festival
- World Festival of Women's Singing
- Festival Vancouver
- International Conference on Women in Music

== Compositions Performed By ==
- Hilliard Ensemble
- International Festival Donne in Musica; Italy
- Bergen International Festival; Norway
- Grand Jubilee for the Year 2000; Rome
- World Festival of Women's Singing
- International Congress on Women in Music; London, England and Bilbao, Spain
- Festival Vancouver; Canada

== Selected Compositions ==
=== Instrumental ===
- When night came... (for the women of Bosnia) clarinet & chamber ensemble or orchestra; or clarinet and piano
- Roundup; saxophone quartet
- Clarion Dances; brass ensemble
- There must be a Lone Ranger! soprano or mezzo, narrator, chamber ensemble
- Rhapsodic Ignition, guitar

=== Choral ===
- Lux Lucis
- Over the City (for Hiroshima)
- Three Medieval Lyrics
- Four Lewis Carroll Songs

=== Vocal ===
- Cowboy Songs

=== Opera ===
- Coyote's Tail; one-act opera for children

=== Dance ===
- Boxiana: The Women's Flyweight Championship of the World
