= SpokAnarchy! =

- "Where Were You In '82?"
- Directed by: David W. Halsell, Erica K. Schisler, Jon Swanstrom, Heather Swanstrom, Theresa Halsell, and Cory Wees
- Produced by: Erica K. Schisler
- Cinematography: Jon Swanstrom
- Edited by: David W. Halsell
- Production companies: Carnage & Rouge
- Distributed by: MVD Entertainment Group
- Release date: August 12, 2011
- Running time: 80 minutes
- Country: United States
- Language: English

SpokAnarchy! is a 2011 documentary film that chronicles the 1980s punk rock scene in Spokane, Washington. Mixing vintage music videos, live clips, and found footage with contemporary interviews, the film portrays what happened when a group of disaffected teenagers from a small, isolated Northwest city embraced the music and fashion of the big-city punk scenes. The interviewees reminisce about their early years as rebels and misfits in a conservative town, and reflect on how their participation in the scene continues to influence their lives as middle-aged adults. Several of the cast have achieved notoriety since the period depicted in the film, including Paul D'Amour, the original bassist for the band Tool, circus sideshow performer Zamora the Torture King, and the creator of Internet meme Keyboard Cat.

The film is not credited to a single director, but to the core production team of David W. Halsell, Erica K. Schisler, Jon Swanstrom, Heather Swanstrom, Theresa Halsell, and Cory Wees. SpokAnarchy! is available on DVD, and a soundtrack was released by Flat Field Records featuring musical performances by Sweet Madness, PP-Ku, The Doubtful Nonagenarians, Terror Couple, Strangulon, The Necromancers, S&M, Vampire Lezbos, M’NA M’NA, Social Bondage, TFL, The Moo Cow Orchestra, and Cattle Prod.

== Production history ==
SpokAnarchy! began as a 20-minute short about a reunion of punk rockers and like-minded bohemians in Spokane, Washington during the summer of 2009. Realizing that no film had yet attempted to tell the story of punk outside such major urban centers as New York, Los Angeles, and London, several of the reunion’s participants decided to expand the project to feature length. They conducted over 60 interviews and assembled 100 hours of both new and old footage, in addition to hundreds of original photographs, flyers, and fanzines from the 1970s and 1980s.

The film premiered at the Garland Theater in Spokane on August 6, 2011. In addition to regular theatrical runs in Spokane and Seattle, SpokAnarchy! has been shown at The Columbia Gorge International Film Festival in Vancouver, Washington; The Landlocked Film Festival in Iowa City, Iowa; The Astoria/LIC International Film Festival in Long Island City, New York; and the Hot Springs Documentary Film Festival in Hot Springs, Arkansas. SpokAnarchy! received a Chris Awards' Honorable Mention at the 59th Columbus International Film & Video Festival.

== Reception ==
Brian Miller of the Seattle Weekly praised the film as "a well-assembled mosaic of voices", and Andrew Matson of The Seattle Times wrote that "[t]he crowning achievement of the documentary SpokAnarchy! is that it's entertaining for the full hour and 20 minutes, despite being about music you've never heard of from a scene you never knew existed." While Ned Lannamann of The Stranger lauds it as "an inviting, generous overview of that era." Jake Austen of Roctober Magazine called SpokAnarchy! "a nice balance between romanticizing... and making it clear that small town punk life could be hellish." Feature stories about the film also appeared in The Spokesman-Review, CityArts, and on NPR station KPLU’s Artscape program. The free weekly newspaper The Pacific Northwest Inlander rated SpokAnarchy! second place behind Vision Quest as the best local film.

== Distribution ==
As of July 24, 2012, SpokAnarchy! On DVD is in distribution by MVD Entertainment Group. The film is also available streaming on Amazon Prime and Filmon.
