= Whangdoodle Entertainers =

American jazz and string band from Seattle, Washington

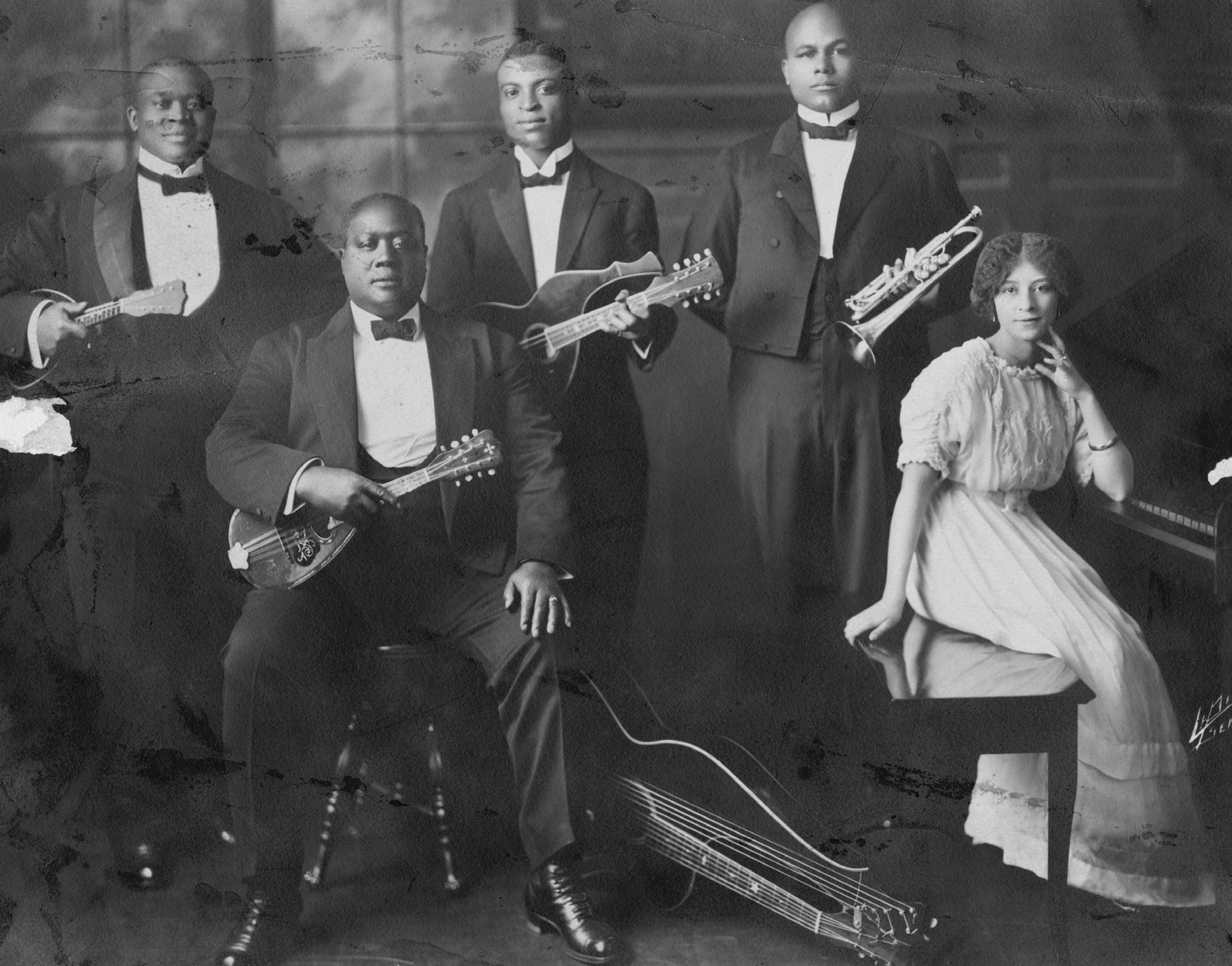
- The Whangdoodle Entertainers in 1914. From left to right, C.A. Hughes, F. R. "Ace" Brooks, H. T. Hollie, Frank D. Waldron, Coty J. Jones.

Background information
- Also known as: Whangdoodle Orchestra; Whangdoodle Trio; Whangdoodle Four; Whangdoodle Quartet; Whangdoodle Quintet; Whangdoodle Ensemble
- Origin: Seattle, Washington, U.S.
- Genres: Jazz; Ragtime; string band
- Years active: 1907–1925

The Whangdoodle Entertainers, sometimes referred to as the Whangdoodle Trio, Whangdoodle Quartet, Whangdoodle Quintet, Whangdoodle Orchestra, and Whangdoodle Ensemble (Note: Variations on Whangdoodle used in the press included Whang Doodle, Wang Doodle, Wangdoodle, and Whangdoodlers. Modern sources sometimes misspell this as Wang Doodle.) was an American jazz and ragtime band formed in Seattle, Washington. They routinely performed throughout the Seattle area from approximately 1907 to 1925.

== The Entertainers (trio, quartet, quintet, orchestra, or ensemble) ==
Although members of the group rotated, along with the name of the group, the manager was "Ace" Brooks of Seattle, Washington.

The first mention of the Whangdoodle Four occurs in a newspaper announcement in The Seattle Republican at the end of 1907. A brief 1909 article in the Freeman: An Illustrated Colored Newspaper lists the members of the Whangdoodle Trio as P. G. Lowery, first mandolin; F.R. Brooks, manager, second mandolin; J.P. Faulkner, tenor, cello; F.E. Lowry, baritone, harp, guitar; and H.E. Mables, bass.

A photo of the Whangdoodle Entertainers, from The Freeman newspaper, 1914, lists the members as C.A. Hughes, H.T. Hollie, F.D. Waldron, F.R. Brooks, and Coddy J. Jones. The Whangdoodle Entertainers performed ragtime, string band music, and jazz.

== Members ==
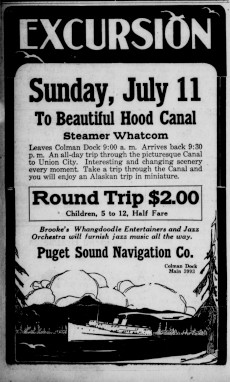
An advertisement from The Seattle Star, July 9, 1920, advertising an excursion featuring music from "Brooke's Whangdoodle Entertainers and Jazz Orchestra".

- F.R., Frank "Ace" Brooks: Popular musician, vocalist, and comedian who toured the country. Manager of the Whangdoodle Entertainers. Before forming the Whangdoodlers, Brooks performed with the Sherrah Quartette which was part of a circus sideshow in 1900 and 1901 under P.G. Lowery's management. A note in the February 16, 1901 edition of The Freeman states, "F.R. Brooks, better known as the "Easy going ace," keeps the house in a continuous uproar all the time he is on the stage. He is naturally one of the funniest comedians in the business."
- Coddy (Coty) J. Jones
- P. G. Lowery: A touring musician, entrepreneur, and band leader, who was referred to as, "The world's greatest colored cornet soloist."
- C.A. Hughes
- H.T. Hollie
- J.P. Faulkner
- F.E. Lowry
- H.E. Mables
- Frank D. Waldron: (1890-1955) A jazz cornetist, alto saxophonist, trumpeter, composer, bandleader, and music teacher who lived in Seattle, Washington.

== External Sources ==
PBS Video Frank Waldron and the Jackson Street Jazz Scene.
