= Kenneth Boulton =

American pianist and music educator

Kenneth Boulton (born 1962 in Seattle, Washington) is an American pianist and music educator. Boulton is currently the dean of the School for Fine Arts at Northern State University in South Dakota.

== Biography ==
Boulton was born in Seattle, Washington, and raised in Arlington, Washington, graduating from Arlington High School in 1980. He received a bachelor's degree in piano performance from Washington State University and a master's degree and doctorate in the same field from the University of Maryland.

In 2008, Boulton was nominated for a Grammy Award in the Grammy Award for Best Instrumental Soloist Performance (without orchestra) category for his piano anthology Louisiana — A Pianist's Journey. It was composed and recorded while he worked as an assistant professor of piano at Southeastern Louisiana University, and incorporated the state's musical heritage.

In 2010, he co-authored with Leonard Lehrman. Elie Siegmeister, American Composer: A Bio-Bibliography, published by Scarecrow Press.

Since 2016, Boulton has served as dean of the School for Fine Arts at Northern State University in South Dakota.

== Personal life ==
Boulton is married to JoAnne Barry, a fellow pianist he met in 1989.

His parents, George and Annalee Boulton, donated a Steinway concert grand piano to the Arlington High School's Lynda M. Byrnes Performing Arts Center. Boulton himself performed at the inauguration of the center in 2007.
