= The Bergevin Brothers =

- Origin: Seattle, Washington, United States
- Genres: Jazz, Political music
- Years active: 2008 - present
- Label: Bergevin Brothers Music
- Members: Jon Bergevin; Joe Bergevin
- Past members: Jake Bergevin; Matt Cameron (Drummer); Patrinell Wright (Vocals/Arranging); Frank Seeberger (Electric guitar); Osama Afifi (Electric Bass); Arturo Rodríguez (Latin Percussion); Jessica Howard (Tambourine); Holly Phillips (Vocals); Jimmy Sisco (Trumpet); Jon Goforth (Saxophone and Woodwinds); Brennan Carter (Trumpet); Greg Schroeder (Trombone); Emmanual Del Casal (Electric Bass); Geoffrey Castle (Fiddle)

The Bergevin Brothers are an American Seattle-based band. Founded by brothers Joe and Jon Bergevin, the band promotes political and other causes through their music. They are most famous for their song "Fired Up, And Ready to Go", that was inspired by United States President Barack Obama's inauguration. The band is currently signed to their own record label Bergevin Brothers Music.

The Bergevin Brothers have also created a musical piece for the film Barack Obama: Who is this Guy? The film was released by Veridicus Films in October 2008. Other projects have included raising money for Hurricane Katrina victims and the Seattle Artists Foundation. Their music will also be featured in the documentary "Barack Obama: The Man and his Journey".

== Influences ==
The Bergevin Brothers list their influences as Elton John, Peter Gabriel, Frank Sinatra, Miles Davis, Pat Metheny, Sting, Billy Joel, Queen, Johnny Cash, Roger Miller, Supertramp, Ray Charles, Frankie Goes To Hollywood, The Eagles, The Doobie Brothers, Madonna and Michael Jackson.

== Discography ==
Year	Album
2008	Seven Songs for America and One for the World (2008)

== Filmography ==
Year	Film	Producer	Role
2008	Barack Obama: Who is this Guy?	Veridicus Films	Cast & Soundtrack
2009	Barack Obama: The Man and his Journey	Veridicus Films	Cast & Soundtrack
2009	By The People	Amy Rice, Alicia Sams	Soundtrack
