= Junkyard Jane =

Blues band

- Origin: Tacoma, Washington
- Genres: Americana, blues
- Years active: 1997 – present
- Members: Leanne Trevalyan; Billy Stoops; Barbra Blue; Pete Marzano; Jim King

Junkyard Jane is an American Northwest "Swampabilly" blues band, performing original music and consisting of: vocalist/percussionist Leanne Trevalyan, vocalist/guitarist Billy Stoops, bassist Barbra Blue, drummer Pete Marzano, and harmonicist/saxophonist Jim King.

The band coined the term "Swampabilly" as their defining genre when asked to describe their sound; a gumbo of Americana, blues, country, folk, funk, rock, and swampy, New Orleans influenced music written by songwriters Trevalyan and Stoops.

Former members include saxophonist Susan Orfield, trombonist Randy Oxford, bassist Alex Featherstone and drummers Chris Leighton, Darin Watkins, and Tom Sunderland.

== History ==
=== Formation ===
Junkyard Jane's beginnings can be traced back to 1997, when the bands Cobalt Hook, The Generators, and a newly formed all-female group merged. When Stoops replaced the guitarist for the girl band, the three ensembles joined forces and became Junkyard Jane, with founding members being Leanne Trevalyan, Billy Stoops, Barbra Blue, Susan Orfield and Chris Leighton.

== Discography ==
Albums

- F-Bombs + Love Letters - 2011
- 10 Year Reunion - 2008
- Rooster Hooch - 2004
- Leftovers - 2002 (limited release)
- Ductape & Sagebrush - 2002
- Swampabilly Snake Oil Freakshow - 2001
- Milkin' the Frog - 1999
- Washboard Highway - 1998

== Awards ==
- BEAM Grant Recipient(Benefiting Emerging Artists in Music)
- "Best Band" - Washington Blues Society BB Award Winner
- "Best NW Recording - Milkin' the Frog" - WBS BB Award Winner
- "Best New Band" - Washington Blues Society BB Award Winner
- "Finalist" - International Blues Challenge, Memphis (The Blues Foundation)
- "Journey to Memphis 2000" Regional 1st Place Winner, Portland, OR
- "Best Regional Act" - 3-Time Cascade Blues Association Muddy Award Nominee
- "Best NW Recording - Milkin' the Frog" - CBA Muddy Award Nominee
- "Best NW Recording - Washboard Highway" - WBS BB Award Nominee

== See also ==
- Swamp pop
- Swamp blues
