= Some By Sea =

American indie rock band

- Genres: Baroque pop, indie pop, symphonic rock
- Years active: 2002 – 2006
- Labels: SideCho Records; Kringle Recordings
- Spinoff of: Ghosts & Liars; Destruction Island; Phantom Fireworks
- Past members: Chris DuBray; Rachel Bowman; Eino Holm; David Bilbrey; Daniel Disparte; Blake Johnston; Tom Pearson; AJ Gard; Lee Haines
- Website: Official site MySpace page Purevolume page

Some By Sea was an orchestral indie rock band from Tacoma, Washington. They have received comparisons to many bands, including Death Cab for Cutie and Arcade Fire.

== History ==
Some By Sea originally formed as the solo project of Chris Du Bray in 2002. His solo act grew with the induction of Eino Holm. In January 2003 Rachel Lee Bowman played her first show with the group, and allowed the band to expand and develop new material. After meeting at a local show, Daniel Disparte (on drums) and David Bilbrey (on bass) joined the outfit in October 2003 and solidified the line-up. Eino Holm left the group in November 2004. David Bilbrey decided to start playing guitar. Blake Johnston joined as the new bass player in January 2005. Some By Sea signed with Sidecho Records in summer 2005. Blake quit in December 2005 and was replaced by Tom Pearson. Following the release of On Fire! (igloo) on March 7, 2006, Tom Pearson & Daniel Disparte chose to leave the group (April 2006) to pursue other interests. From April 2006 and August 2006 Some By Sea played their remaining shows with Lee Haines, AJ Gard and other friends.

The band released their debut album, Get Off the Ground If You're Scared, in January 2004, on their own label, Kringle Recordings. Get Off the Ground If You're Scared was performed by Chris Du Bray, Eino Holm and Rachel Lee Bowman and recorded by an independent producer in June 2003. After touring for their debut album, Some By Sea returned to the studio to record new material. Some of this material was released on their The Saddest Christmas EP, also on Kringle Recordings.

In 2005, Some By Sea signed with SideCho Records. The following spring (March 7, 2006), the band released their second LP, On Fire: Igloo, which received positive reviews. After their tour in support of their latest album, Some By Sea announced they would be disbanding. Their final show was played to a full room at Hell's Kitchen in Tacoma on August 11, 2006 with Cavalier, Tex & Speaker Speaker. Chris DuBray later spoke about the break-up in an interview for his next band, Ghosts & Liars:

"It was more of a series of frustrating circumstances that lead me to decide I couldn't take it much longer. When we returned from our first On Fire! (Igloo) tour in April of 2006, we'd all stopped communicating to each other in any way that wasn't passive aggressive... Nothing that occurred from that point on ever felt 100 percent honest and healthy."

== Band members ==
- Chris Du Bray: vocals, guitar, piano
- Rachel Lee Bowman: cello, keyboards, vocals
- Eino Holm: guitar, bass guitar
- David Bilbrey: guitar, bass guitar, lap steel, keyboards, vocals
- Daniel Disparte: drums
- Blake Johnston: bass guitar
- Tom Pearson: bass guitar
- AJ Gard: drums, bass guitar
- Lee Haines: bass guitar

== Discography ==
=== Albums ===
- Get Off The Ground If You're Scared (January 2004)
- The Saddest Christmas EP (September 2005)
- On Fire! (Igloo) (March 7, 2006)

== Associated acts ==
- Chris Du Bray & Rachel Bowman went on to form Ghosts & Liars together, with a sound similar to that of Some By Sea. Ghosts & Liars also included Lee Haines and AJ Gard. They began recording on SideCho Records until the group disbanded in March 2008. Their last show was with David Bazan (of Pedro the Lion) in Chehalis, Wa. Chris continues to record music as Pomes.
- Rachel Lee Bowman continues to record music as a solo artist.
- David Bilbrey went on to form Canon Canyon & Rural Wolf Records with Michael Cooper. He also continues to write his own music as Xylophones & Phantom Fireworks (the name varies based on who's performing) and has continued playing in Destruction Island (with Daniel Disparte and others).
