= Tom Collier (musician) =

American jazz musician

Tom Collier (born June 30, 1948) is a multi-instrumental percussionist and vibraphonist, with a career in music spanning more than fifty years. He has performed and recorded as a session musician with many important jazz, classical, and popular artists. He has also performed and recorded with his own jazz group and has released solo albums. He joined the faculty at the University of Washington in 1980.

== Childhood ==
Collier was born in Puyallup, Washington on June 30, 1948 and grew up in Seattle, Washington. His parents were professional musicians; Ward Collier, known to his friends as "Whitey", played trumpet in various lounge bands around the Seattle/Tacoma area. His mother, Ethel, often played piano in her husband's quartet. Tom Collier made his first public appearance in Puyallup, Washington on April 2, 1954 at age 5 on the xylophone and in the spring of 1957, he appeared on "Top Tunes and New Talent, a nationally televised television show hosted by bandleader Lawrence Welk. His first professional performances were at age 9 as a marimba player, and then at age 13 he was a guest artist at the 1962 Seattle Worlds Fair with Lawrence Welk in concert at the Seattle Center Coliseum.

With the emergence of rock and roll as the dominant musical force in America, the young Collier was exposed to music that would have a lasting impact on his career. As a teenager growing up in Seattle, he enjoyed the music of The Wailers (rock band), a Tacoma, Washington-based rock band considered by many to be the first garage rock group. Collier was especially fond of their song "Dirty Robber". At the same time, he was exposed to jazz through his father's recordings of Charlie Parker, Lionel Hampton, Duke Ellington and others. At the age of 11, his father took him to see Lionel Hampton in concert. "That was a life-changing experience. I saw him play the vibes with such energy, but I also remember how he jumped on top of a fortified tom tom and danced on it. The crowd went wild."

By the time Collier graduated from West Seattle High School in 1966, he was beginning to compose and record pieces rooted in rock and jazz with his longtime friend, guitarist and electric bassist Dan Dean. The two would continue playing music together well into the 21st century.

== Education ==
Collier attended Olympic Jr. College in Bremerton, WA, 1966-1967, studying arranging and music theory with Dr. Ralph Mutchler and playing drums in the Olympic College Stage Band. In May, 1967, he played under the direction of Quincy Jones who was the featured guest artist at the school's annual jazz festival. The following month, Tom was offered a four-year undergraduate Rockefeller Fellowship to study and perform modern avant-garde music at the University of Washington in Seattle. During his four years at the University (1967-1971), he performed several world premiere contemporary classical works with famed clarinetist/composer William O. Smith as well as playing drums in the school's Studio Jazz Ensemble. In 1971, Collier performed with the U.W. Contemporary Group at Town Hall in New York, one of only three students playing alongside professional faculty musicians. He graduated from the University later that spring with two undergraduate degrees: Bachelor of Arts in Music (B.A.) and Bachelor of Music in Percussion (B.M.).

== Career ==
Collier was director of percussion studies at the University of Washington from 1980 to 2016. Upon his retirement in 2016, he was named Professor Emeritus by the University's School of Music and College of Arts and Sciences. In 1991, Collier released his instrumental album Pacific Aire, in which he collaborated with Bud Shank on alto saxophone and flute and Don Grusin (Dave Grusin's brother) on keyboards. Jazz writer Scott Yanow appreciated the level of musicianship evident in the album, but he criticized the music as "lightweight...as if no one is taking any real chances." He continued that "Collier's eight originals are pleasing if not memorable, and there is no stretching taking place."

The year 2004 saw the release of Collier's album Mallet Jazz on Origin Records, another instrumental showcase in which he was joined by fellow session musicians from throughout his career including percussion hall-of-famer Emil Richards on marimba, Joe Porcaro and John Bishop on drums, and Mike Lang and Don Grusin on piano. Dave Brubeck's longtime clarinetist Bill Smith also appeared on the album along with longtime Collier friend and collaborator Dan Dean who played electric bass on all tracks. Critic Adam Greenberg wrote of the album, "The intricate lines devised by Collier show off the abilities of the lead duo [Collier and Richards], and the solos taken by both Collier and Richards alone make the album worth hearing."

== Discography ==
- 1979 Journey Without Maps (with Northwest Jazz Sextet)
- 1980 Whistling Midgets (with Dan Dean)
- 1991 Pacific Aire
- 2004 Mallet Jazz
- 2005 Duets (with Dan Dean)
- 2015 Across the Bridge (with Larry Coryell, Bill Frisell, Dan Dean, John Bishop, Ted Poor)
