= Hipster hop =

Dated cultural term

- Other names: Hipster rap
- Stylistic origins: Alternative hip hop; EDM; hip hop
- Cultural origins: Early to mid-2000s, United States
- Typical instruments: Vocals; synthesizer; turntables; sampler; keyboard; guitar; strings

Hipster hop (also known as hipster rap) is hip hop music perceived to be influenced by the hipster subculture in the early to mid-2000s. Artists such as The Cool Kids and Kid Cudi were hipster hop, though they did not embrace this label.

== Characteristics ==
Hipster hop is generally characterized as having a lighthearted mood. Miles Raymer of the Chicago Reader stated that "hipster rap embodies the same sort of utopian, big-tent ideal that old-school hip-hop did, treating the music as a force for bringing people together". Hipster hop artists have also been described as having lyrical content ranging from the "emotionally vulnerable" to the "ironic [or] comedic". A Miami New Times article characterized Spank Rock as hipster hop for having lyrical content that focused "almost exclusively on partying".

Musically, the "hipster hop" label has been used to describe a wide variety of styles, ranging from "a sonic explorer like Kanye... [to] retro revivalists like the Cool Kids". However, some authors have identified highly electronic production that verged on dance music as a trademark of the hipster hop scene. Pharrell Williams has also been described as a sonic influence on hipster hop.

In addition to its musical characteristics, hipster hop has been defined by hipster-inspired fashion. Clothing choices such as skinny jeans and brightly-colored apparel have been identified as prominent markers of hipster hop artists. Kanye West has been described as a model for hipster hop fashion, due to his "sleekly fashionable, high concept" image.

The term "hipster hop" is often viewed as pejorative; while it became popular among critics, few artists have used the "hipster hop" label to describe themselves.

== History ==
Artists such as Kanye West, Pharrell Williams, and Lupe Fiasco have been identified as forerunners of hipster hop. Sir Michael Rocks of the Cool Kids has stated that those three artists popularized the idea of being "an eclectic black guy", thus creating a niche for other artists to expand the aesthetic boundaries of hip-hop.

The terms "hipster hop" and "hipster rap" declined sharply in the 2010s, although they have occasionally been used to describe post-2010s artists such as Razzlekhan.

== See also ==
- Alternative R&B
- Neo soul
