= Brent Amaker and the Rodeo =

American Country and Western band

Brent Amaker and the Rodeo is an American Country and Western band from Seattle, Washington consisting of Brent Amaker, Johnny Nails, Jordan Gomes, Ben Strehle, and Bryan Crawford.

== Overview ==
Brent Amaker and the Rodeo formed in Seattle, Washington, in 2005. The band's image recalls influential country musician Johnny Cash, 'The Man in Black', as they dress head-to-toe in black with matching Stetson hats and cowboy boots. They are billed as influenced by art rock performers Devo and glam rock's David Bowie.

Much emphasis is put into the band's image as evidenced by a large collection of photos and music videos done by the band, fans, and photographers and videographers. The Rodeo have a cinematic quality and are often put in context of Spaghetti Western films made by Sergio Leone and Ennio Morricone.

Their concerts often feature a dancing girl from local burlesque troupes and a phenomenon only known as the "Whiskey Baptism" where Amaker welcomes new fans into the "Church of the Rodeo" by pouring shots of liquor into their mouths.

Recently, they have been gaining notoriety from their cover of "Pocket Calculator" by German electro-pioneers Kraftwerk.

They also performed in the indie slasher film "Punch" directed by Jay Cynik. Cynik also wrote a comic book based on the exploits of the band on tour called "Mescal de la Muerte." Illustrated by Portland, Oregon artist, Simon Young, the graphic adult novel was included in their 2010 release "Please Stand By."

== Personnel ==
- Brent Amaker-Vocals/Guitar
- Ryan Leyva (AKA Johnny Nails) - Lead Guitar
- Jordan Gomes - Bass
- Ben Strehle-Rhythm Guitar, back-up vocals
- Bryan Crawford-Drums, back-up vocals

Former Members

- Tiny Dancer
- Lance Mercer
- Cinderella
- Mason Lowe
- Curtis Andreen
- Tim Harmon
- Louis O'Callaghan
- Nicholas Markel
- Graig Markel
- Sugar McGuinn
- Aaron Mlasko

== Discography ==
- Brent Amaker and the Rodeo - 2006
- Howdy Do (Gravewax Records) - 2008
- Please Stand By (Spark & Shine) - 2010
- Year of the Dragon (Fin Records) - 2013
- Android Amaker - 2014
- Philaphobia (Killroom Records) - 2024

== Compilations ==
- Californication 2009 Soundtrack

== Singles ==
- When Love Gets to a Man
- Man In Charge featuring Tilson from The Saturday Knights (Remix) (Spark & Shine)
- Pocket Calculator (Kraftwerk cover) (Spark & Shine)
- Captain of the Ship(Spark & Shine)
- Johnny's Theme PSmoov Remix (Spark & Shine)

== Film/TV/Other Appearances ==
- Brent Amaker and the Rodeo's song "Doomed" was featured on the season 7 finale of the Showtime series Weeds.
- Brent Amaker and the Rodeo's song "You Call Me the Devil" was featured on the Showtime series Californication on Season 2 Episode 6 "Coke Dick & the First Kick"
- Brent Amaker and the Rodeo appeared in Jay Cynik's indie slasher film "Punch" and contributed music to the film's soundtrack
- Brent Amaker and the Rodeo's song "Man In Charge" was featured in Episode 2 of HBO's mini-series Big Little Lies featuring Nicole Kidman and Reese Witherspoon.
- Brent Amaker and the Rodeo's song "Country Sky" was featured in Episode 6 of HBO's mini-series Sharp Objects featuring Amy Adams.
