= Ceremonial Castings =

American black metal band

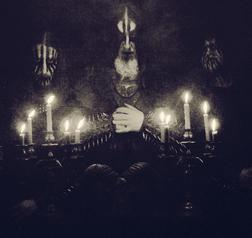
- From left to right: Bloodhammer, Lord Serpent, Old Nick

Background information
- Origin: Battle Ground, Washington, United States
- Genre: Symphonic black metal
- Years active: 1996 - Present
- Label: Dark Forest Productions
- Members: Jake Superchi (Lord Serpent); Nick Superchi (Old Nick); Matthew Mattern (Bloodhammer)
- Website: http://www.ceremonialcastings.net/

Ceremonial Castings are an American black metal band from Washington. Described as "Bewitching Black Metal", their style draws from black magic and witchcraft. They toured Central America with Gorgoroth in September 2012.

== History ==
Ceremonial Castings began in the late fall of 1996. The band was founded by brothers Jake (The Witcher) and Nick Superchi (OldNick). The band's lyrics focus on black magic, witchcraft, and rituals, which inspired their name.

Founded in Battle Ground, Washington, the band describes its music as a mix of black, death, and thrash metal with classical, symphonic, and dark ambient influences.

Lord Serpent and Old Nick are involved in musical projects, ranging from death metal, to black metal, to ambient. Links to these projects can be found on Ceremonial Castings' Myspace page.

The brothers Superchi are related to novelist and short story writer Nathaniel Hawthorne. They are direct descendants of Hawthorne's great-great-grandfather, Judge John Hathorne.

== Discography ==
=== Albums ===
- Into The Black Forest Of Witchery (2002)
- Immortal Black Art (2005)
- Barbaric is the Beast (2006)
- Salem 1692 (2008)
- March Of The Deathcult (2011)
- Cthulu (2014)

=== Demos & EP's ===
- Witchcraft (tape 1996)
- Vampira (1997)
- Demonic (1998)
- Blood Like Wine (2000)
- Vampira - The Second Coming (2000)
- 13 Roses (2000)
- The Garden of Dark Delights (2001)
- The Chaos Chapter (2002)
- Fullmoon Passions (2002)
- Midnight Deathcult Phenomena (2003)
- Universal Funeral March (2003)
- The Extermination Process (2003)
- Into The Black Forest Of Witchery (re-recording) (2004)
- Reign In Hell (A Tribute to Slayer) (2013)

=== Other ===
- Beast In Black (Compilation) (2010)
- Bewitching Black Metal (Live) (2013)

== Other projects ==
=== Thy Emptiness ===
J.S. - All Vocals, Guitars & Drums

O.N. - All keys, synths & piano

- Crowned Under Cascade Rain (2013)

=== The Dead ===
Nick The Gremlin - Vocals, Guitars, Keys, Bass
Jake O' Lantern - Drums

- They Come For Brains (2001)
- Start Killing (2006)
- Cadaver Cuts (Split) (2007)

=== Mysticism Black ===
Old Nick - All Instruments

- War Hymns Of The Dark Communion (Demo) (2002)
- The Rite Of War (Split Album) (2003)
- The Dark Erudition (2006)
- Return Of The Bestial Flame (2019)

=== Serpent Lord ===
Lord Serpent - All Instruments

- Battle Horns (Demo) (2003)
- The Rite Of War (Split Album) (2003)
- The Order Of The Snake (Demo) (2004)

=== Uada ===
Jake Superchi - Vocals, Rhythm Guitar
Nate Verschoor - Bass
Rob Shaffer - Lead Guitar
Pierce Williams - Drums

- Devoid of Light (2016)
- Cult of a Dying Sun (2018)
- Djinn (2020)
- Crepuscule Natura (2023)

== Sources ==
- Official Ceremonial Castings site
