= Seattle Girls Choir =

The Seattle Girls Choir (SGC) was established in 1982 by Dr. Jerome L. Wright as a "junior conservatory" where young women from throughout the Puget Sound region could gather after school to develop their music education.

In 2009, Dr. Wright retired as artistic director of SGC. He was succeeded by Jacob Winkler, who served as artistic director for the next thirteen years. In 2022, Sarra Sharif Doyle was hired as artistic director, the first woman to hold the role in the organization's 40-year history.

The Choir School is divided into six levels, from youngest to oldest: Piccolini, Dolcine, Vivissimi, Allegra, Cantamus and Prime Voci. SGC also offers an entry-level group for older beginning singers, Entrata, as well as a small contemporary ensemble for teens, Sorella. Students range from the Kindergarten through 12th grades.

The curriculum includes vocal technique, music theory, sight singing, solfege, ear training, and general musicianship.

== Achievements ==
=== First-place awards ===
- International Youth & Music Festival – Vienna, Austria
- Llangollen International Musical Eisteddfod, Wales – First Prize, Youth Choir Division
- International Choral Kathaumixw, Canada – First Prizes in Youth Choirs & Chamber Choirs

=== Second-place awards ===
- International Choral Kathaumixw, Canada – Second place in Children's Choir Competition
- Llangollen International Musical Eisteddfod, Wales – Second Place, Children's Folk Song Choir

=== Special performances ===
- Salzburg Festival, performance, July 19, 2009
- World Festival of Women's Singing – Salt Lake City, Feb. 4–7, 2004
- Czech Sacred Music Festival, Prague – Featured Choir, 2003
- Seattle Girls' Choir Twentieth Anniversary Concert – Benaroya Symphony Hall, Seattle – June 2002
- World Festival of Women's Singing (Americafest) – Co-host Choir with Elektra – 2001 Concerts at Town Hall, St. James Cathedral and Benaroya Symphony Hall, Seattle
- ACDA National Convention, San Antonio, Texas – March 2001
- Mass at St. Peter's Basilica & Concert at St. Ignatius, Rome – 2000
  - Part of the Millennium Jubilee Cathedral Tour. Cathedrals concerts in Vienna, Salzburg, Munich, Venice, Ravenna, Siena, Florence and Rome (by invitation of the Pope.)
- Portland International Children's Choir Festival "Featured American Choir" – 1998
- ACDA National Convention, San Diego, California – March 1997
- Harvard University Festival of Women's Choirs – 1996
- AmericaFest 1994: Concerts in Minneapolis, Des Moines, Chicago, Grand Rapids, Toronto, Quebec City, the Maritimes and New England. (One of four Founding Choirs with Tapiola Choir of Finland, Shchedryk Choir of Ukraine and Efroni Choir of Israel.)
- ACDA National Convention, San Antonio, Texas – March 1993
- International Singing Week (Europa Cantat) – Veszprem, Hungary—1992
- International Choral Sympaatti – Helsinki & Tampere Finland – 1990
- ISME International Conference – Finlandia Hall, Helsinki – 1990
- Goodwill Games Arts Festival – Host Choir for the Soviet-American Youth Choir Festival – 1990
- Chorus America National Convention
- MENC National Convention – Anaheim, California – 1986
- East Coast US Tour – 1984 Boston, New York (UN & St. John the Divine), Philadelphia (Mayor's Fourth of July Celebration at Independence Hall), Washington, DC, Baltimore and Orlando
- West Coast US Tour – 1982 Portland, Eugene and San Francisco (Grace Cathedral)

=== European concert tours ===
1985, 1987, 1990, 1992, 1998, 2000, 2003, 2006, 2009, 2012, 2016,2018, 2022, 2024 Countries visited: Norway, Finland, Denmark, Estonia, Russia, Germany, Belgium, Switzerland, Austria, Czech Republic, Hungary, Romania, Croatia, Slovenia, Italy, France, England, Scotland, Wales, Slovakia, Latvia, Lithuania
