= Leroy Ostransky =

American musician and writer on music history

Leroy Ostransky (January 17, 1918 – October 11, 1993) was an American composer, music educator, and writer of books on jazz.

== Early life ==
Ostransky grew up in a Jewish ghetto on the Lower East Side in New York city, the son of Russian Jewish immigrant parents, Max Ostransky and Sophie Ostransky (née Friedman). Ostransky's father, a saloon owner during prohibition known to the neighborhood as "Sharkey", had greater aspirations of success for his son Leroy as a violinist. Ostransky's memoir details his difficult relationship with his father, who could be both physically and emotionally manipulative and even abusive.

== Musical career ==
After leaving home at seventeen, Ostransky worked as a pianist in a jazz club before receiving his doctorate in musical arts at the State University of Iowa in 1959. He went on to found the Workshop Band, one of America's early experimental jazz bands. In addition to his published books, Ostransky composed 75 educational pieces and had five of his compositions performed by the Seattle Symphony. Additionally, he was the professor emeritus of music and composer-in-residence at the University of Puget Sound. In 1975, he was named one of the twelve greatest teachers in America by People magazine.

== Literary work ==
As an author about the history of jazz, Ostransky wrote several books on the subject. Paul Oliver has found that few authors "were as liberal with their catalogue of influences" as Ostransky, as his The Anatomy of Jazz attributed everything from country life to Italian arias as influences of jazz.

== Publications ==
- The Anatomy of Jazz, 1960
- Understanding Jazz, 1977
- Jazz City: The Impact of Our Cities on the Development of Jazz, 1978
- Sharkey's Kid: A Memoir, 1991
