= Frank D. Waldron =

American jazz musician (1890–1955)

- Born: 1890; San Francisco, California, U.S.
- Died: 1955 (aged 64–65) Seattle, Washington, U.S.
- Genre: Jazz
- Occupations: Musician; composer; bandleader; music teacher
- Instruments: Cornet; alto saxophone; trumpet
- Formerly of: Whangdoodle Entertainers; Odean Jazz Orchestra

Frank D. Waldron (1890–1955) was an American jazz cornetist, alto saxophonist, trumpeter, composer, bandleader, and music teacher who lived in Seattle, Washington. He was born in San Francisco, California in 1890 and eventually moved to the Pacific Northwest by the beginning of World War I. When he initially moved to Washington, he began his performance career at Camp Lewis—known as Fort Lewis today—playing dance music at the local pavilion attended by soldiers and company. By 1915, he joined the Whangdoodle Entertainers, playing alongside pianist Coty Jones. Waldron and the Whangdoodle Entertainers became notable playing in underground clubs and speakeasies, typical of Prohibition-era jazz music. Following his time with the Whangdoodle Entertainers, he joined the Odean Jazz Orchestra. Later, the Odean Jazz Orchestra would be one of very few black bands to perform at Nanking Café in downtown Seattle which rarely incorporated the integration of black musicians in the night scene. In 1919 Waldron opened The Waldron School of Trumpet and Saxophone where he taught students such as Buddy Catlett and Quincy Jones. Waldron being an expert in his field, taught his pupils the basics of embouchure and phrasing, sight-reading, tonguing, furthermore even improvisation and ear-training. These specialized techniques were staple artistic skill for musicians to achieve before moving forward in their musical endeavors.

While at this time Seattle operated largely outside of the radar of the large East coast jazz record labels, Waldron self-published his own records. This included Frank D. Waldron Syncopated Classic, The Kaiser's Got the Blues (Since Uncle Sam Stepped In), and Valse Queen Ann. His publication, Frank D. Waldron Syncopated Classic was a music instructional book for piano and alto saxophone that featured techniques to inspire and educate other musicians. He wrote 9 compositions for this publication which serve as a symbol of the musical mastery of jazz musicians such as himself and in the Seattle area brought to the jazz scene. One of his earlier compositions, The Kaiser's Got the Blues (Since Uncle Sam Stepped In) was a patriotic song in response to World War I published in 1918. This composition is an example of Frank D. Waldron's musical intelligence for detail and impeccable technique for song writing during the early 20th century Jazz influence.

By the 1910s, Waldron set up his studio on 1040 Jackson Street in Seattle. At the time only 800 Blacks lived in the area, but a thriving jazz scene was already starting in the area around 12th Avenue South and Jackson Street.

Waldron was married to Phoebe Ellen Waldron and had a child named W. Lee Waldron. Frank D. Waldron died in Seattle, Washington in 1955 at the age of 65.

== Legacy ==
Frank D. Waldron was one of the most influential musicians and educators in Seattle’s early jazz scene. He taught numerous students who would go on to shape the city’s musical legacy, including Buddy Catlett, Ron Pierce, Jabo Ward, and Quincy Jones. Waldron’s teaching emphasized foundational techniques such as embouchure, phrasing, sight reading, tonguing, improvisation, and ear training. These skills were considered essential for jazz musicians.

In 2017, musician Greg Ruby recovered and transcribed Waldron’s lost compositions. He released Seattle’s Syncopated Classic as a tribute to Waldron’s contribution to jazz in the Pacific Northwest.

== External Sources ==
PBS video Frank Waldron & The Jackson Street Jazz Scene

== See also ==
- 1920s in jazz
- Music of Seattle
- Whangdoodle Entertainers
