= Megs McLean =

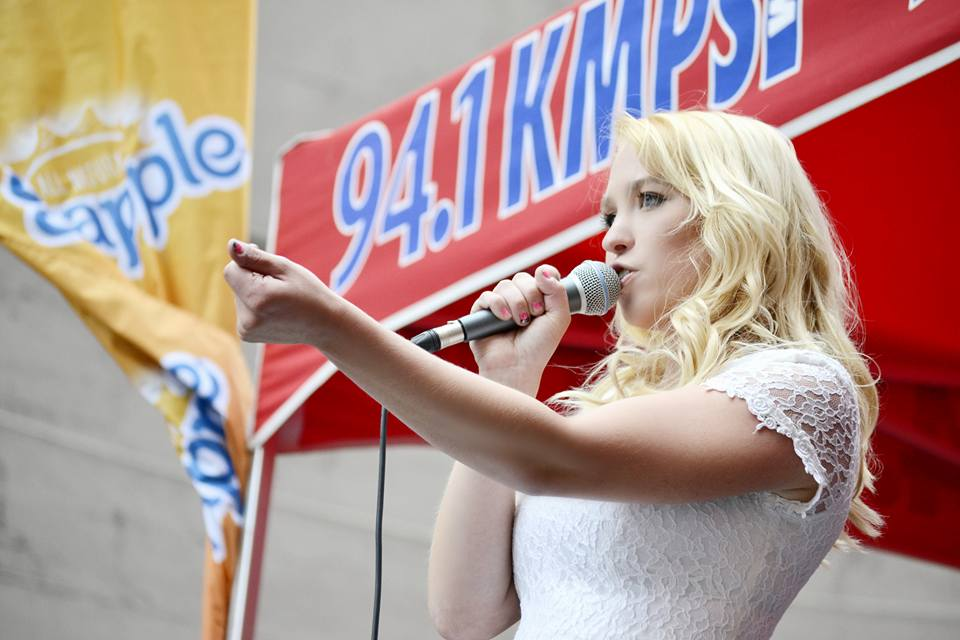
- Megs McLean performing on August 8, 2015

Background information
- Born: February 19, 1997 (age 28)
- Genres: Country, rock, crunge
- Occupation(s): Singer, songwriter
- Years active: 2015–present
- Website: megsmclean.com

Megan McLean (born February 19, 1997) is a singer, songwriter, recording artist, and performer from Snohomish, Washington, McLean and her band perform a mixture of guitar-driven country/grunge originals and covers. McLean is known for her American country-rock-grunge (crunge) sound.

McLean's first single, as well as her new album, was recorded at London Bridge Studio by Geoff Ott in Shoreline, Washington, with Ben Smith of Heart on the drums, Brad Smith from Blind Melon on bass, and featured Shohei Ogami on guitar.

McLean is better known for her breakout single track titled "It's My Truck" which was released in 2015, and was awarded Country Pick of the Week in 2016. She also released her "Virtually Me" virtual reality app at the 94.1 KMPS pop-up show Taylor Swift concert in Seattle.

== Early life and influences ==
McLean was born to John and Leslea McLean and is one of two girls, who with her younger sister was raised in Snohomish, Washington, and attended Glacier Peak High School.

== Career ==
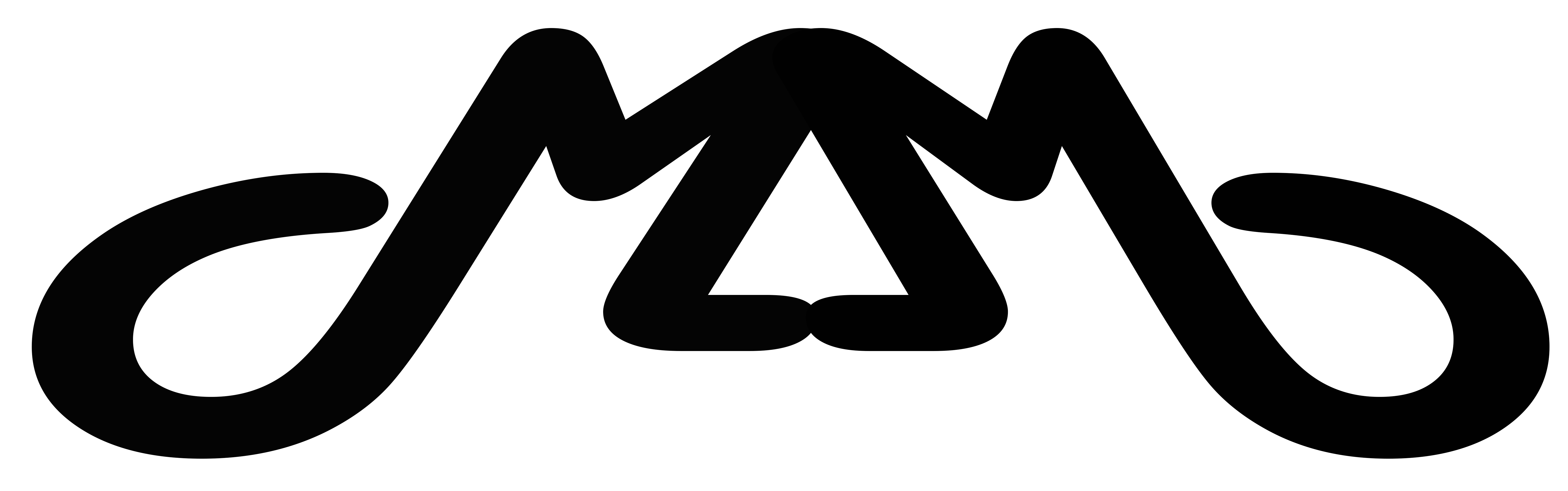
McLean's Logo, two M's in the shape of a cowboy hat

McLean started out as an actress, starring in Canna, a short film, in 2013.

In 2015 McLean released her first single titled "It's My Truck" featuring a production team including Ben Smith (Heart), Brad Smith (Blind Melon), Jeff Balding, and Andrew Mendleson. Her single was recorded at London Bridge Studio in Seattle, Washington. Her songs are produced by Geoff Ott, producer and owner of London Bridge Studio. There was a making-of video produced by Todd and Jackson of Turn Left Productions. McLean was the first artist to have her likeness etched into the vintage Neve 8048 recording console at London Bridge Studio.

In 2016 McLean released Out of School also recorded at London Bridge Studio. In 2017, McLean re-released "Don't Speak" from the EP as a single in 2017 with a music video.

In 2018 she began opening for larger acts such as Lorrie Morgan, Pam Tillis, Clint Black and Sara Evans. Then, in 2019 she released a single, "Frisky", out of London Bridge Studio.

== Personal life ==
McLean attended college at the University of Montana where she was a member of the Griz rodeo team. She dropped out to pursue music when she was offered an exclusive deal with ReelTime. She is involved in barrel racing and gymkhana locally in Snohomish, Washington.
