= Seattle Pro Musica =

American choir

- Origin: Seattle, WA, United States
- Genres: Choral, A cappella, Classical, Contemporary
- Years active: 1972–present
- Members: Artistic Director; Karen P. Thomas
- Past members: Founder; Richard Sparks
- Website: www.seattlepromusica.org

Seattle Pro Musica is an American choir, based in Seattle, Washington, performing under the direction of conductor and artistic director Karen P. Thomas. Seattle Pro Musica is widely considered to be one of the finest ensembles in the Pacific Northwest, and has received international recognition and acclaim for its CD recordings and live performances. Seattle Pro Musica has appeared as a featured ensemble on the NPR radio show Saint Paul Sunday, has performed by invitation for the World Festival of Women's Singing 2004, Festival Vancouver 2003 in Canada, the American Guild of Organists National Convention 2000 and the American Choral Directors Association Northwest Division Conventions 2000 and 2006, as well as numerous Northwest festivals. Seattle Pro Musica produced and hosted the American Masterpieces Choral Festival in 2007, under the auspices of the National Endowment for the Arts' American Masterpieces Choral Initiative.

== Awards ==
- Margaret Hillis Achievement Award for Choral Excellence
- ASCAP/Chorus America Award for Adventurous Programming of Contemporary Music

== Premieres ==
- Four Lewis Carroll Songs, Karen P. Thomas, 1989
- Three Medieval Lyrics, Karen P. Thomas, 1993
- Lux Lucis, Karen P. Thomas, 2003
- Veni, Sancte Spiritus, John Muehleisen, 2005
- Three New Motets, Steven Stucky, 2006
- Da Pacem, John Muehleisen, 2008
- Canticum Canticorum IV, Ivan Moody, 2010
- You Have Ravished My Heart, Karen P. Thomas, 2010
- I Sing of Love, Bernard Hughes, 2012
- Wild Nights, Karen P. Thomas, 2013
- Eternity Passing Over: an Arctic Requiem, John Muehleisen, 2015

== Discography ==
=== CDs ===
- Rachmaninov's All Night Vigil: Vespers (1998)
- Alnight by the Rose (2001)
- Weihnachten! A German Christmas (2002)
- Peace in Our Time (2002)
- Music of the Spirit (2006)
- American Masterpieces (2008)
- Navidad (2009)
- In Dulci Jubilo (2011)
- Horizons - digital release (2012)
- Celtic Christmas (2013)
- Northern Lights (2016)
- Silent Night (2019)
- Panta Rhei (2021)
