= Tim Gemmill =

American jazz musician (born 1949)

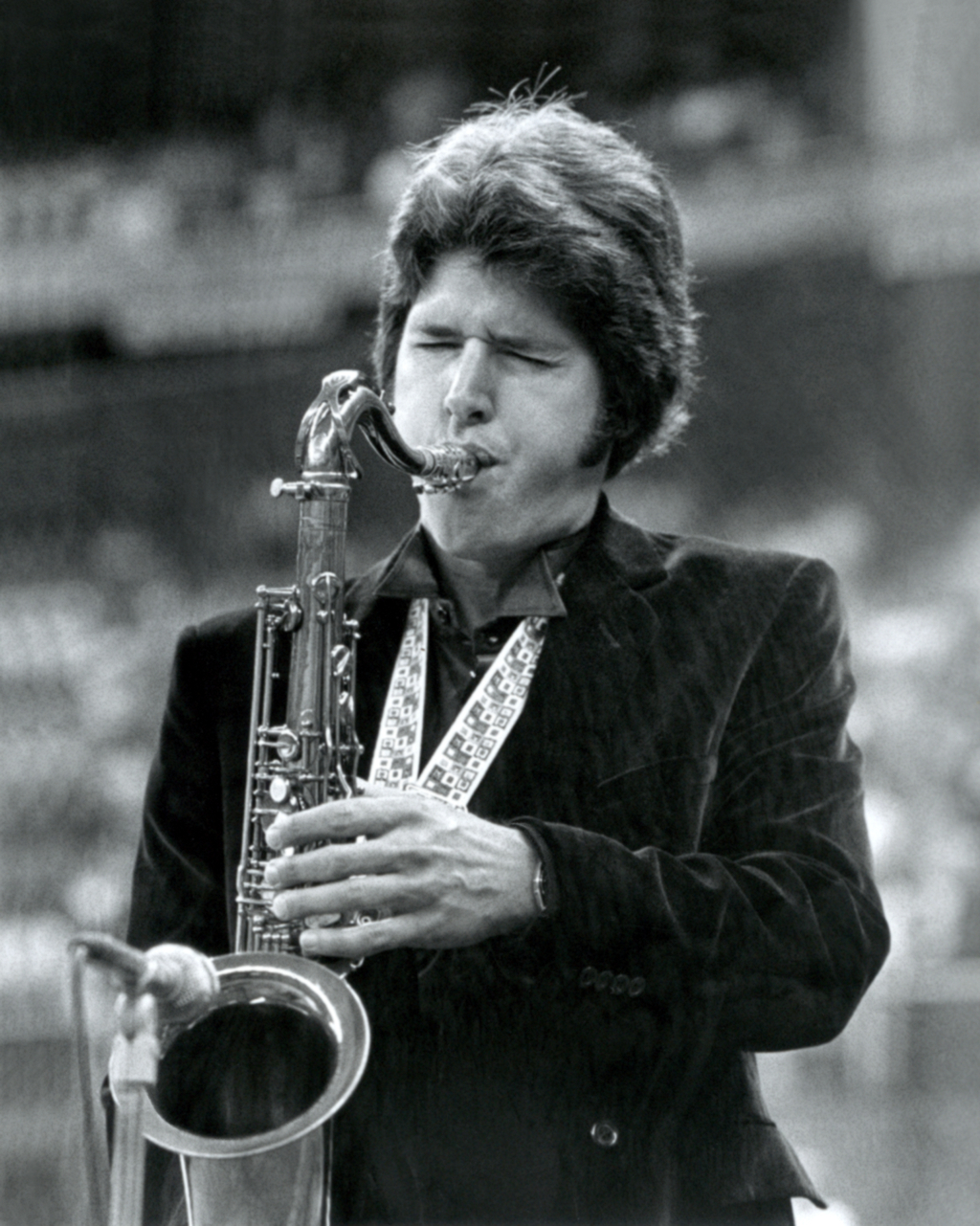
- Tim Gemmill performing the National Anthem, Seattle Mariners, Kingdome, August 1982

Background information
- Born: Timothy Jon Gemmill; May 28, 1949 (age 76); Seattle, Washington, US
- Origin: Seattle, Washington and Hackensack (1972–1977), US
- Genres: jazz, post-bop, avant-garde jazz, jazz fusion, digital jazz, techno
- Occupations: Musician, composer, arranger, record producer, bandleader, graphic designer, entrepreneur
- Instruments: Tenor saxophone, soprano saxophone, flute, piano, electric piano, keyboards, synthesizers, digital audio workstation
- Years active: 1967–present
- Labels: Cozgem Records, ITI Records, Rocka Records
- Website: cozzettiandgemmill.com

Timothy Jon Gemmill (born May 28, 1949) is an American jazz musician, composer, arranger, producer, bandleader, graphic designer and entrepreneur, who has been involved in musical projects since the late 1960s. Most notably; Music Projection Trio (1970–1972), Rorschach (1973–1977), Cozzetti & Gemmill Quartet (1978–1982), Cozzetti & Gemmill (1983–present), Rocka Records (1994–2004), Rocka.com (1999–2004) and Cozgem Records (1981–present).

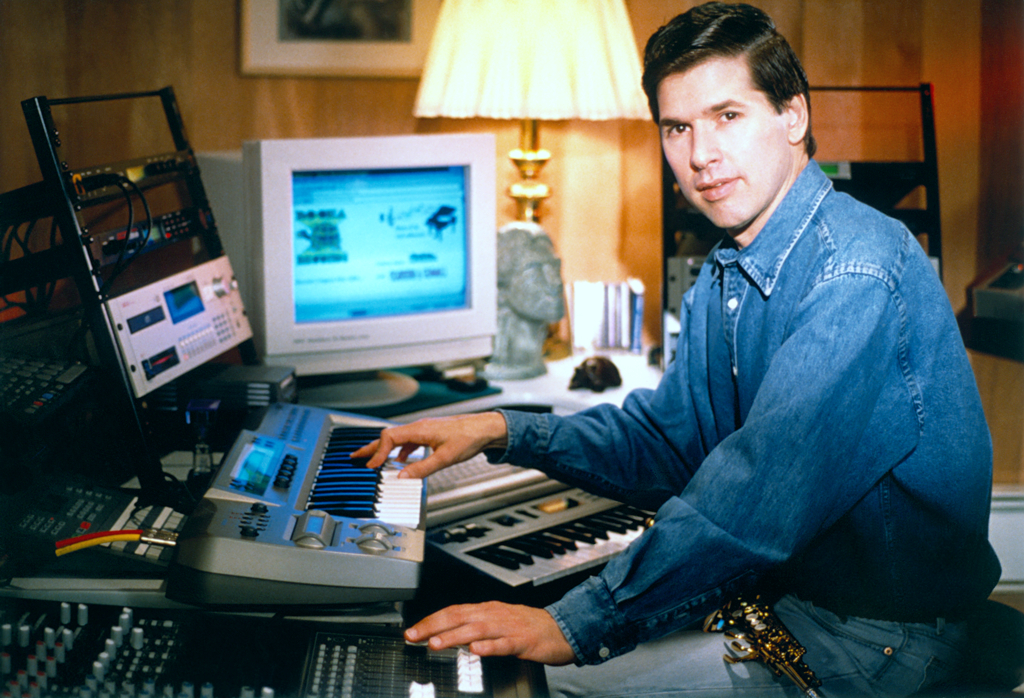
Tim Gemmill, Cozgem Studios, 2005

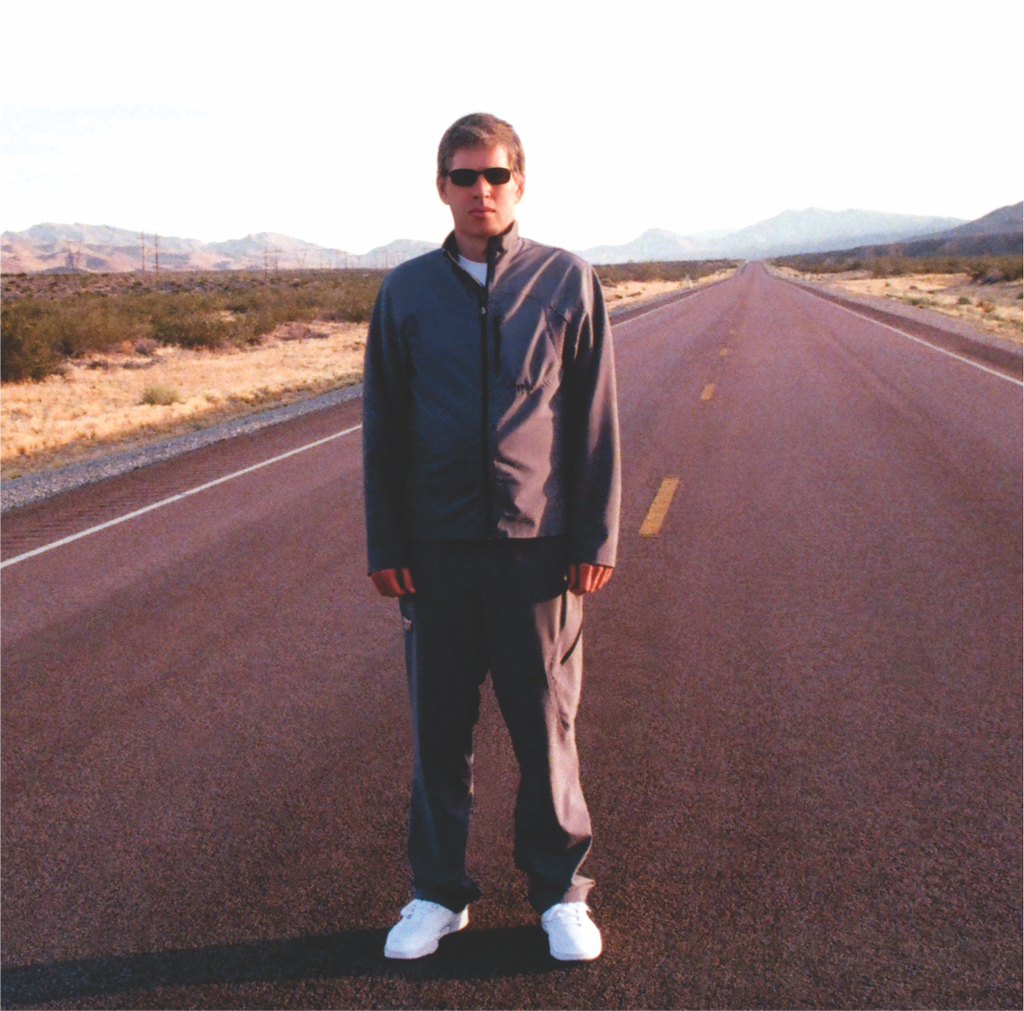
Tim Gemmill, U.S. Route 93, September 2016

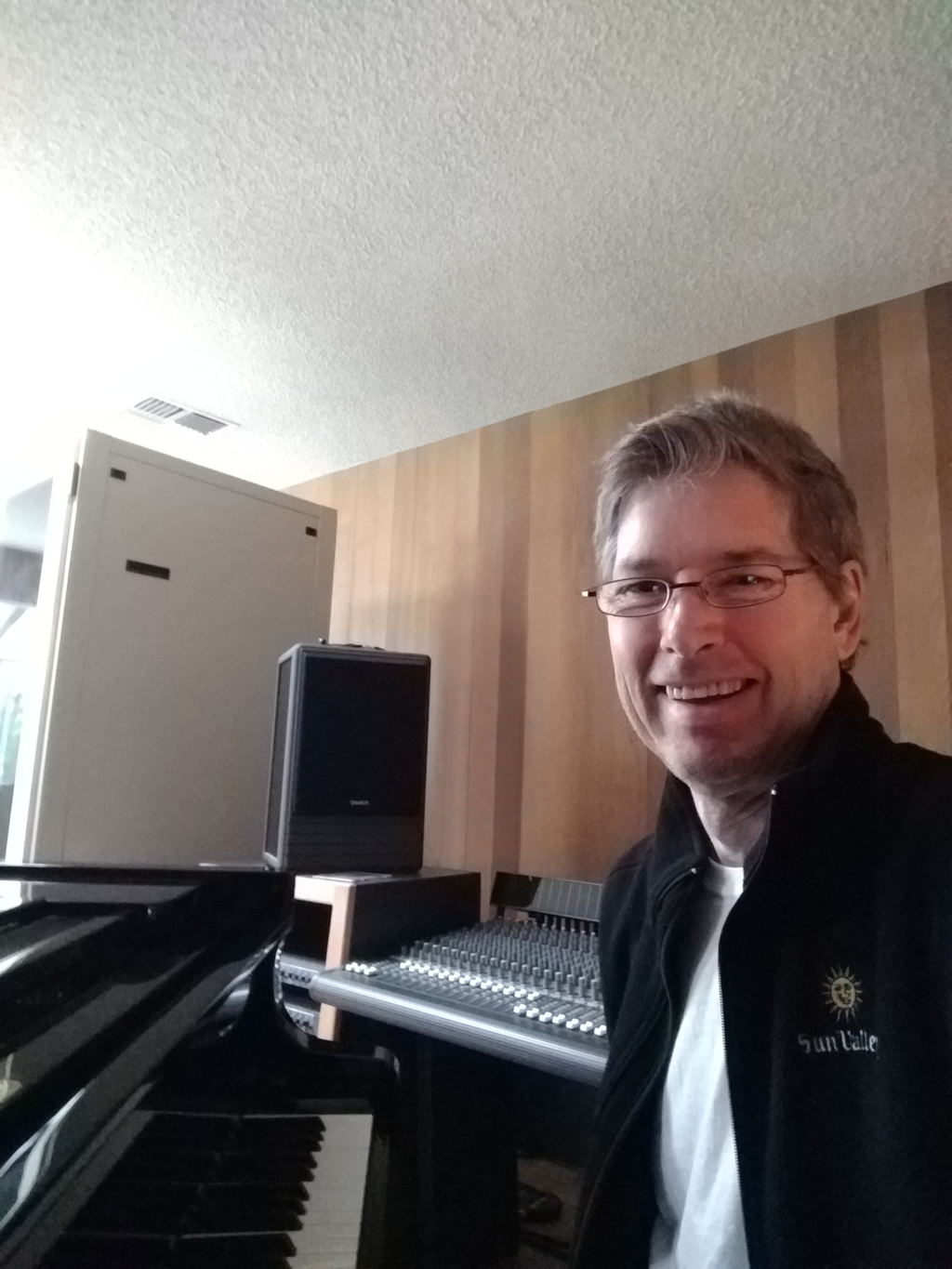
Tim Gemmill, Cozgem Studios, June 2017

== Discography ==
- 1981: Cozzetti & Gemmill, Concerto For Padré (Cozgem Records)
- 1984: Cozzetti & Gemmill, Soft Flower in Spring (ITI Records)
- 1994: Cozzetti & Gemmill,Timeless (Rocka Records)
- 2010: Cozzetti & Gemmill, Timeless (Cozgem Records)
- 2011: Voyage of the Mummy (Cozgem Records)
- 2013: Road Songs (Cozgem Records)
- 2017: Road Songs 2 (Cozgem Records)
