= Elmer Gill =

American jazz musician

Elmer Gill (February 17, 1926, Indianapolis - May 28, 2004, Vancouver, BC) was an American jazz pianist, vibraphonist, and singer.

Gill was stationed in France during World War II and studied there at the Dijon Conservatory. After the war he studied at the University of Washington and led his own group called the Question Marks in Seattle. He toured North America with Lionel Hampton in 1952-1953 and continued playing with his own groups for decades. Among those he worked with were David Friesen, Frank Rosolino, Carl Fontana, and Eddie "Lockjaw" Davis. By the 1980s Gill was based in Vancouver, British Columbia, though he still regularly played in the Pacific Northwest of the United States; he also toured Europe and Japan several times. In the late 1980s his touring trio included his son Donald on drums and Kohji Yohyama on bass.
