= NoClue =

American rapper (born 1985)

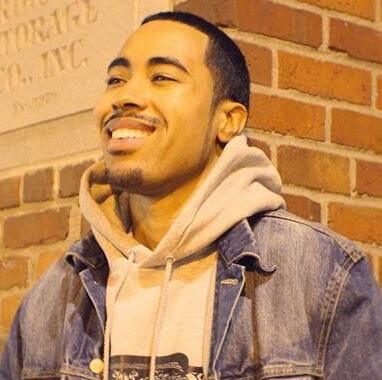
- NoClue in 2016

Background information
- Also known as: NoClue
- Born: Ricky Raphel Brown; January 28, 1985 (age 41); Seattle, Washington, U.S.
- Origin: Central District, Seattle, Washington
- Genres: Hip Hop, West Coast Hip Hop, Hip Hop Music in the Pacific Northwest
- Occupations: Rapper, video producer, songwriter
- Years active: 2004–Present
- Label: Long Live LLC
- Website: https://web.archive.org/web/20100826132359/http://www.noclueofficial.com/

Ricky Raphel Brown (born January 28, 1985), known professionally as NoClue, is an American rapper from Seattle. He is best known for obtaining the title of the world's official “Fastest Rap MC” by Guinness World Records, for rapping 723 syllables in 51.27 seconds (14.1 syllables per second) in January 2005.

== Early life ==
NoClue grew up in the city of Seattle, Washington. He was reciting raps by the age of four and began writing his own lyrics at age 9. Brown grew up around the music business, as his grandfather was a member of the gospel band, The Singing Galatians, and earned studio experience while attending his grandfather's every-other-Sunday recording sessions with that band. Brown's first recordings were overdubs of popular rap beats, made with his cousins while Brown was still in junior high.

== Musical style and influences ==
NoClue is a hip hop artist influenced by West Coast Hip Hop. He has established himself as a multi-dimensional lyricist with sharp, upbeat energy expressed in each of his songs. Brown counts rapper Tupac Shakur as an early musical influence. He explains that his stage name NoClue is derived from “the fact that the world had no clue what kind of impact he was about to bring”.

== Sponsorships and endorsements ==
=== Wix Music and YouTube Space NYC ===
To celebrate the launch of Wix.com Music in November 2015, NoClue was selected by the #OpeningAct campaign for a special 6K 360 virtual reality production at the YouTube Space New York, featuring his single, 'Voices'.

=== Mercedes-AMG ===
NoClue's song, 'Movement', was featured in a nationwide commercial in Germany for the Mercedes-AMG luxury vehicle line (2014 models) throughout the year 2014.

=== Microsoft Windows Azure ===
NoClue was chosen as the face of Microsoft Windows Azure in October 2012. The relaunching commercial has gone viral and proved to be controversial, being criticized for Brown's lightning-fast, difficult delivery yet praised for his articulate lyrics. An online contest is currently being held on behalf of Microsoft to compete with Brown's rap.

=== Samsung's Galaxy S III with Optus 4G ===
NoClue teamed up with the world's fastest speaker (Sean Shannon), fastest reader (Howard Berg), and fastest texter (Melissa Thompson), to launch Optus' debut of consumer 4G networks along with the introduction of the Samsung Galaxy S III in September 2012 in Sydney and Perth, Australia.

== Long Live LLC and Cinema 28 ==
NoClue is the CEO and founder of Long Live LLC. A video production subsidiary launched during the fall of 2012, aptly named Cinema 28. The company is specializing in professional model portfolios, music videos, and wedding cinematography, with the inclusion of drone cameras and 4K equipment. Long Live LLC's debut video short was premiered on World Star Hip Hop on January 21, 2014, amassing a total of more than 950,000 views, featuring Jenn of Bad Girls Club, Season 10 and NoClue's music single, 'Clapp'.

== Music Centro ==
NoClue has been named Co-Chief Executive Officer of MusicCentro.com, a global music marketing and distribution hub geared toward independent artists as of February 2014, alongside Liam Toller, of ThisIzHot.com.

== Media appearances ==
=== iTunes ===
NoClue's album, NoClue, debuted on the front page of iTunes Top 50 Chart in October 2014.

=== Discovery Channel ===
NoClue was featured on the Discovery Channel's television program, Daily Planet, on their Top Ten Fastest Things on the Planet compilation countdown on April 23, 2014.

== Music releases ==
=== Discography ===
- NoClue – EP: (2014)
- Just Landed – Mixtape: (2012)
- 4Warning – EP: (2011)
- The Beginning – EP: (2010)

=== Music videos ===
- 12th Man - Seattle Seahawks Anthem: Featured on KUBE 93.3. 600,000+ YouTube views.
- Limelight feat. Sean Carson: Featured on MTV's website.
- Movin Slow: Featured on World Star Hip Hop (WSHH) with over 4.3 million views

== Guinness World Record ==
As a 20-year-old, Brown broke the Guinness World Record in 2005 to become the fastest rapper in the world. The attempt was recorded at Seattle's B&G Studios on January 15, 2005, in front of a licensed speech therapist. Brown rapped at a clip of 14.1 syllables per second, beating the previous 12.5 syllable-a-second record set in 1998 by Chicago rapper Rebel XD. NoClue's since beaten record is recorded in Guinness World Records 2006, released in August 2005.
