= Floyd Standifer =

American musician

Floyd Standifer (1929–2007) was an American jazz musician who helped establish the jazz music scene in Seattle. He played tenor saxophone and trumpet, sang, and was bandleader of the Floyd Standifer Quartet.

Born in Wilmington, North Carolina on January 3, 1929, Standifer moved to Oregon in 1936 with his parents. His father was an African Methodist Episcopal Zion preacher and his mother a schoolteacher. Standifer had four siblings and lived on a farm near Gresham, Oregon. He played the tuba in high school and taught himself to play saxophone and trumpet. In 1937, he played drums for a Works Progress Administration band in Portland.

In 1946, when his father was transferred to a church in Seattle, Standifer enrolled at the University of Washington to study physics. His academic career did not last long. He began playing jazz with other young musicians, including Quincy Jones and Ray Charles, as well as singer Ernestine Anderson and bassist Buddy Catlett, who played with the Count Basie Orchestra.

In 1959, he joined a big band tour of Europe, organized by Jones and featuring Catlett and pianist Patti Bown, also from Seattle. He played at and composed a jazz liturgy, "Postlude," for the Seattle world's fair and later recorded two albums, How Do You Keep the Music Playing and Scotch and Soda. Later in his career, he played at the Pampas Club and New Orleans Creole Restaurant, performed with the Seattle Repertory Jazz Orchestra, and was included in the Seattle Jazz Hall of Fame. The city of Seattle proclaimed May 9, 1996 and October 20, 2000 "Floyd Standifer Day." He was honored by two Mayors for his musical accomplishments and contributions to the city. Mayor Paul Schell honored him at Earshot Jazz Festival.

Standifer was also a teacher. He taught at Cornish College of the Arts, the University of Washington, Olympic College in Bremerton, the Northwest School as well as teaching jazz history at the summer jazz program at the Saskatchewan Summer School of the Arts in Fort San, Saskatchewan in the early 1980s. He also spoke to and performed for thousands of local students as part of Earshot's "Roots of Jazz" series.

He died in Seattle, Washington, on January 22, 2007, at Virginia Mason Hospital.
