= Sir Mix-a-Lot discography =

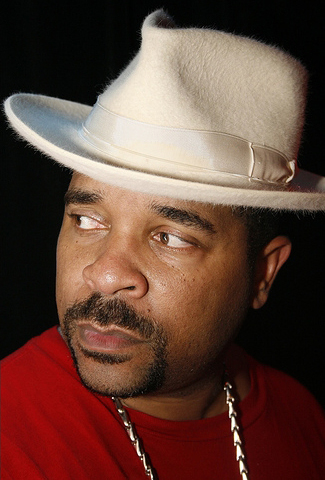
- Studio albums: 6
- Singles: 17
- Music videos: 8

The discography of American rapper Sir Mix-a-Lot consists of six studio albums and 17 singles.

== Albums ==
List of albums, with selected chart positions
Title	Album details	Peak chart positions		Certifications
Title	Album details	US	US R&B	Certifications
Swass	Released: September 1, 1988; Label: Nastymix (Note: Re-releases after 1991 were on Def American, later renamed American Recordings.); Format: CD, cassette, digital download, LP	82	20	RIAA: Platinum
Seminar	Released: October 17, 1989; Label: Nastymix; Format: CD, cassette, digital download, LP	67	25	RIAA: Gold
Mack Daddy	Released: February 4, 1992; Label: Def American / Warner Bros.; Format: CD, cassette, digital download, LP	9	19	RIAA: Platinum
Chief Boot Knocka	Released: July 19, 1994; Label: American / Warner Bros.; Format: CD, cassette, digital download, LP	69	18	
Return of the Bumpasaurus	Released: August 27, 1996; Label: American / Warner Bros.; Format: CD, cassette, digital download, LP	123	55	
Daddy's Home	Released: September 9, 2003; Label: Rhyme Cartel; Format: CD, digital download	—	—	
"—" denotes releases that did not chart.

== Singles ==
Year	Title	Peak chart positions						Certifications	Album
Year	Title	US	US R&B	US Rap	US Dance Singles	AUS	UK	Certifications	Album
1985	"I Just Love My Beat / Square Dance Rap"	—	—	—	—	—			
1986	"I'm a Trip"	—	—	—	—	—			
1986	"Square Dance Rap"	—	—	—	—	—	81		Swass
1988	"Posse on Broadway"	70	44	—	21	—	—		Swass
1988	"Rippn'" (with Kid Sensation)	—	—	—	—	—	—		Swass
1989	"Iron Man" (featuring Metal Church)	—	—	17	—	—	—		Swass
1989	"Beepers"	—	61	2	—	—	—		Seminar
1990	"I Got Game"	—	86	20	—	—	—		Seminar
1990	"My Hooptie"	—	49	7	—	—	—		Seminar
1992	"One Time's Got No Case"	—	—	10	—	—	—		Mack Daddy
1992	"Baby Got Back"	1	27	7	1	8	56	RIAA: 2× Platinum; ARIA: Gold; BPI: Gold	Mack Daddy
1992	"Swap Meet Louie"	—	—	—	—	—	—		Mack Daddy
1994	"Put 'Em on the Glass"	—	—	—	—	—	—		Chief Boot Knocka
1994	"Ride"	—	—	47	—	—	—		Chief Boot Knocka
1994	"Sleepin' wit My Fonk"	—	—	—	—	—	—		Chief Boot Knocka
1996	"Jump on It"	97	89	27	37	—	—		Return of the Bumpasaurus
1998	"Batter Up"	—	—	—	—	—	—		Bootleg Booty, Vol. 2 (Compilation)
"—" denotes releases that did not chart or were not released in that territory.

== Music videos ==
Year	Title	Director
1988	"Posse on Broadway"	Brad Huskinson
1989	"Iron Man"	Brad Huskinson
1989	"Beepers"	Brad Huskinson
1990	"My Hooptie"	Brad Huskinson
1992	"Baby Got Back"	Adam Bernstein
1992	"One Time's Got No Case"	Bob Kubilos
1994	"Ride"	Frank Sacramento
1996	"Jump On It"	
