= Ice Daddy =

Studio album by Gucci Mane
- Released: June 18, 2021
- Length: 51:13
- Label: 1017; Atlantic
- Producer: 30 Roc; D.A. Got That Dope; iWeirdo; J-Bo; Marzeratti; Mike Will Made It; Mojo Krazy; PabloMCR; Richie Souf; Shawn Ferrari; Shoddy; Southside; SpiffoMadeIt; Twysted Genius; WizardMCE; Zaytoven

Gucci Mane chronology
Trap God Classics: I Am My Only Competition (2020)	Ice Daddy (2021)	1017 Up Next (2023)

Singles from Ice Daddy
- 1. "Shit Crazy" Released: April 30, 2021; 2. "Like 34 & 8" Released: June 10, 2021; 3. "Poppin" Released: June 17, 2021; 4. "Posse on Bouldercrest" Released: June 18, 2021

Ice Daddy is the fifteenth studio album by American rapper Gucci Mane. It was released through Atlantic Records and 1017 Global Music on June 18, 2021. The album features guest appearances from BigWalkDog, Pooh Shiesty, Sir Mix-a-Lot, BIG30, Lil Baby, Lil Uzi Vert, 2 Chainz, Young Dolph, E-40, Project Pat, and Peewee Longway. Production was handled by PabloMCR, WizardMCE, Mike Will Made It, Marzeratti, 30 Roc, Twysted Genius, Shawn Ferrari, iWeirdo, Southside, Richie Souf, Zaytoven, J-Bo, Shoddy, D.A. Got That Dope, SpiffoMadeIt, and Mojo Krazy. The album is named after Ice Davis, the son of Mane and his wife, Jamaican model Keyshia Ka'oir.

== Background ==
The title of the album is named after Ice Davis, the son of Gucci Mane and his wife, Jamaican model Keyshia Ka'oir. Ice was almost six months old when the album was released Ice Daddy is the first album by Mane to be released since the birth of their son on December 23, 2020. Ice also features on the album's cover art. The release date of the album is also the second anniversary of Mane's single, "Proud of You", a promotional single off of his thirteenth studio album, Delusions of Grandeur (2019).

== Release and promotion ==
On April 29, 2021, Mane announced the title of the album alongside its cover art, stating that it would be available to pre-order the following day. However, on the same day, before the release date was revealed to the public, Billboard gave its release date out. On June 10, 2021, Mane appeared on an episode of YouTube Released for the week for the premiere of the official music video of his single "Like 34 & 8", which features American rapper and fellow labelmate Pooh Shiesty; in the episode, he confirmed the track "Posse on Bouldercrest", a remake of American rapper and record producer Sir Mix-a-Lot's single "Posse on Broadway", from his debut studio album, Swass (1988), and announced that Sir Mix-a-Lot's chorus on the original song would remain on the song, but did not announce the features on the song. Gucci revealed the album's tracklist on June 16, 2021.

== Singles ==
Gucci Mane released the lead single of the album, "Shit Crazy", featuring American rapper BIG30, as part of the pre-order of the album on April 30, 2021. The second single, "Like 34 & 8", featuring American rapper and fellow labelmate Pooh Shiesty, was released on June 10, 2021. "Poppin", a collaboration with American rapper and fellow labelmate BigWalkDog, was released as the third single on June 17, 2021, one day before the release of the album; however, Gucci uploaded the song to his YouTube channel on May 24, 2021, and this also became BigWalkDog's first song through 1017 Records to be released commercially. The fourth single, "Posse on Bouldercrest", featuring Pooh Shiesty again and American rapper Sir Mix-a-Lot was released along with the album on June 18, 2021.

== Critical reception ==
Professional ratings
Review scores
Source	Rating
Clash	6/10

Writing for Clash, Robin Murray felt that the album "leans on his trademark brand without adding anything new to the overall picture" and it indeed "struggles to maintain a momentum over its 17 tracks", but later clarified that "it's not a failure". On a negative review, Tim Hoffman of Riff Magazine compared the weaknesses that he felt were present in the album to that of American rapper Moneybagg Yo's chart-topping fourth studio album, A Gangsta's Pain, opining that it "delivers what is effectively two or three good songs that are then replicated to pad the runtime" and it "delivers on quality guest features like E-40 and Project Pat while delivering a handful of decent beats to carry some of the songs".

== Track listing ==
Ice Daddy track listing
No.	Title	Writer(s)	Producer(s)	Length
1.	"Poppin" (with BigWalkDog)	Radric Davis; Dajour Walker; Donovan Hardie; Harry Potter	PabloMCR; WizardMCE	3:34
2.	"Posse on Bouldercrest" (featuring Pooh Shiesty and Sir Mix-a-Lot)	Davis; Lontrell Williams, Jr.; Anthony Ray; Michael Williams II; Marquell Middlebrooks	Mike Will Made It; Marzeratti	3:37
3.	"Shit Crazy" (featuring BIG30)	Davis; Rodney Wright, Jr.; Samuel Gloade; Deundraeus Portis	30 Roc; Twysted Genius	2:42
4.	"Like 34 & 8" (featuring Pooh Shiesty)	Davis; L. Williams; M. Williams; Ernest Day, Jr.; iWeirdo	Mike Will Made It; Shawn Ferrari; iWeirdo	3:52
5.	"Dboy Style"	Davis; Joshua Luellen; Tony Son	Southside; Richie Souf	2:36
6.	"Trap Shit" (featuring Lil Baby)	Davis; Dominique Jones; Xavier Dotson	Zaytoven	3:06
7.	"I Got It" (featuring Lil Uzi Vert)	Davis; Symere Woods; M. Williams; James Brown; Justin Garner	Mike Will Made It; J-Bo	2:11
8.	"Rich Nigga Shit"	Davis; Luellen	Southside	2:49
9.	"Top of Shit" (featuring 2 Chainz and Young Dolph)	Davis; Tauheed Epps; Adolph Thornton; Dotson	Zaytoven	3:06
10.	"Never Runnin Out of Money" (featuring E-40)	Davis; Earl Stevens; Gloade	30 Roc	2:46
11.	"Fold Dat Money" (featuring Project Pat)	Davis; Patrick Houston; M. Williams; Anthony Brown	Mike Will Made It; Shoddy	4:09
12.	"Gucci Coming 4 U"	Davis; M. Williams	Mike Will Made It	2:33
13.	"Invoices"	Davis; David Doman	D.A. Got That Dope	2:32
14.	"Live at the Red Carpet" (featuring Peewee Longway)	Davis; Quincy Williams; Gloade	30 Roc	2:40
15.	"Bust Down"	Davis; M. Williams	Mike Will Made It	3:25
16.	"Lately"	Davis; Lavonte Powers; Mojo Krazy	SpiffoMadeIt; Mojo Krazy	3:03
17.	"How I See It"	Davis; M. Williams	Mike Will Made It	2:24
Total length:				51:13

Sample credits

- "Posse on Bouldercrest" contains samples from and interpolates "Posse on Broadway", written by Anthony Ray and performed by Sir Mix-a-Lot.

== Personnel ==
- Irene Sourlis – A&R administration all tracks)
- Darrale Jones – A&R direction (all tracks)
- Eddie "eMIX" Hernandez – mixing (tracks 1, 3, 5, 6, 8–11, 13, 14, 16), recording (tracks 1–3, 5, 8, 11)
- Amani "A $" Hernández – assistant mixing (tracks 1, 3, 5, 6, 8–11, 13, 14, 16)
- Daniel Rowland – mastering (track 1)
- Salvador Majail – recording (tracks 1, 10, 12, 14–17
- PabloMCR – programming (track 1)
- WizardMCE – programming (track 1)
- Jaycen Joshua – mixing (track 2)
- DJ Riggins – assistant mixing (track 2)
- Jacob Richards – assistant mixing (track 2)
- Mike Seaberg – assistant mixing (track 2)
- Colin Leonard – mastering (tracks 2–17)
- Mike Will Made It – programming (tracks 2, 4, 7, 11, 12, 15, 17)
- Marzeratti – programming (track 2)
- 30 Roc – programming (tracks 3, 10, 14)
- Twysted Genius – programming (track 3)
- Kori Anders – mixing (tracks 4, 7, 12, 15, 17)
- Rayshaun McIntosh – assistant mixing (tracks 4, 7, 12, 15, 17)
- Shawn Ferrari – programming (track 4)
- iWeirdo – programming (track 4)
- Southside – programming (tracks 5, 8)
- Sean Paine – recording (tracks 6, 7, 9
- Zaytoven – programming (tracks 6, 9)
- J-Bo – programming (track 7)
- Migui Maloles – recording (track 10)
- Salvador Majail – recording (track 10)
- Shoddy – programming (track 11)
- D.A. Got That Dope – programming (track 13)
- SpiffoMadeIt – programming (track 16)
- Mojo Krazy – programming (track 16)

== Charts ==
Chart performance for Ice Daddy
Chart (2021)	Peak position
US Billboard 200	34
US Top R&B/Hip-Hop Albums (Billboard)	18
