= Iron Man (Sir Mix-a-Lot song) =

1988 song by Sir Mix-a-Lot

Single by Sir Mix-a-Lot featuring Metal Church

from the album Swass
- Released: 1988
- Studio: Lawson, Seattle, Washington
- Genre: Rap metal; rap rock
- Length: 4:20
- Label: Nastymix
- Songwriters: Tony Iommi; Ozzy Osbourne; Geezer Butler; Bill Ward; Anthony Ray
- Producer: Sir Mix-a-Lot

Sir Mix-a-Lot singles chronology
"Rippn (with Kid Sensation)" (1988)	"Iron Man" (1988)	"Beepers" (1989)

Metal Church singles chronology
"Watch the Children Pray" (1986)	"Iron Man" (1988)	"Badlands" (1989)

Music video
- "Iron Man" on YouTube

"Iron Man" is a song by American rapper Sir Mix-a-Lot featuring the heavy metal band Metal Church. It appears on Sir Mix-a-Lot's debut studio album Swass (1988) and was released as a single in 1988. The track reworks Black Sabbath's 1970 riff and chorus with newly written rap verses and live metal instrumentation.

== Background, recording and release ==
Sir Mix-A-Lot recorded "Iron Man" with the Seattle band Metal Church playing the guitar parts live, instead of using samples from the original Black Sabbath track. The song was released as the fourth single from Swass, with a 12" maxi-single that included several mixes, including the "True Metal Meltdown" version. When it was released, the single was played on MTV alongside Mix-A-Lot's earlier hit "Posse on Broadway". At the time of its release, trade publications predicted that the single would perform well commercially.

In a 2009 interview, Mix-A-Lot said he was never fully happy with the song, saying he had been nervous about recording it and worried that it might make people question his dedication to hip-hop.

== Composition ==
The song is an early example of rap/metal crossover, featuring Mix-A-Lot rapping over live heavy-metal guitar riffs performed by Metal Church. It has been described as a metal-infused hip-hop track that incorporates elements of Black Sabbath's original 1970 song "Iron Man".

He has said the track was part of his early experiments with blending rap and rock and that he has always loved heavier music. He described the collaboration with Metal Church as "completely organic" and "nothing was forced". The song has also been described as an early rap-metal or hip-rock crossover, and Mix-A-Lot later said it was influenced by the success of Run-DMC's rock-rap collaborations.

== Reception ==
CMJ praised the song's mix of rap and metal, saying it featured some of the "best unsampled guitar chops on any rap record around" and suggested it could appeal to rock audiences. Contemporary trade publications described the single as a promising release from NastyMix Records, predicting it would perform well during the summer of 1989.

BlabberMouth reported that in a 2003 interview with The Onion A.V. Club, Mix-a-Lot said he didn't like the song in retrospect, calling it an obvious attempt to capitalize on what Run-DMC was doing. Rolling Stone Australia included the song in its list of "10 Classic Covers of Black Sabbath and Ozzy Osbourne", describing it as a rap-rock rewrite of the original song with Metal Church performing the Tony Iommi riff.

== Commercial performance ==
The song was played on regional radio stations after its release, with reports noting early additions to playlists at stations including WIQI in Tallahassee.

== Legacy ==
According to Magnet magazine, the track was one of Mix-A-Lot's early experiments with rap-rock fusion, along with other collaborations like "Square Dance Rap" with Metal Church and "Freak Momma" with Mudhoney.

== Cultural impact ==
The single was released with a music video, and in 1988 the mayor of Seattle declared April 29 as "Sir Mix-A-Lot Day".

== Charts ==
Chart (1988)	Peak position
US Hot Rap Songs (Billboard)	17

== Release history ==
Region	Date	Format	Label	Track listing
US	1988	12" single	Nastymix	A. "Iron Man" (Album Version) – 4:20; B. "Iron Man" (12" Remix) – 5:10; C. "Iron Man" (Instrumental) – 4:18

== Formats and track listings ==
=== 7" single ===
Format	Label	Year	Track listing
7" single	Nastymix	1988	A. "Iron Man" (Album Version) – 4:20; B. "Iron Man" (Instrumental) – 4:18

=== 12" single ===
Format	Label	Year	Track listing
12" single	Nastymix	1988	A. "Iron Man" (Album Version) – 4:20; B. "Iron Man" (12" Remix) – 5:10; C. "Iron Man" (Instrumental) – 4:18

=== Promo single ===
Format	Label	Year	Track listing
12" promo	Nastymix	1988	A1. "Iron Man" (Album Version) – 4:20; A2. "Iron Man" (Radio Edit) – 3:45; B1. "Iron Man" (12" Remix) – 5:10; B2. "Iron Man" (Instrumental) – 4:18

== Personnel ==
- Sir Mix-a-Lot – vocals, songwriter, producer, mixing engineer, engineer
- Metal Church – guest musicians (guitars, bass, drums)
- Tony Iommi - songwriter
- Ozzy Osbourne - songwriter
- Geezer Butler - songwriter
- Bill Ward - songwriter
