= Newberry High School =

Newberry High School may refer to:

- Newberry High School (Florida), Newberry, Florida
- Newberry High School (Michigan), Newberry, Michigan
- Newberry High School (South Carolina), Newberry, South Carolina
- Newberry Academy, Newberry, South Carolina
