= Contributing property =

Key component of a place listed on the National Register of Historic Places

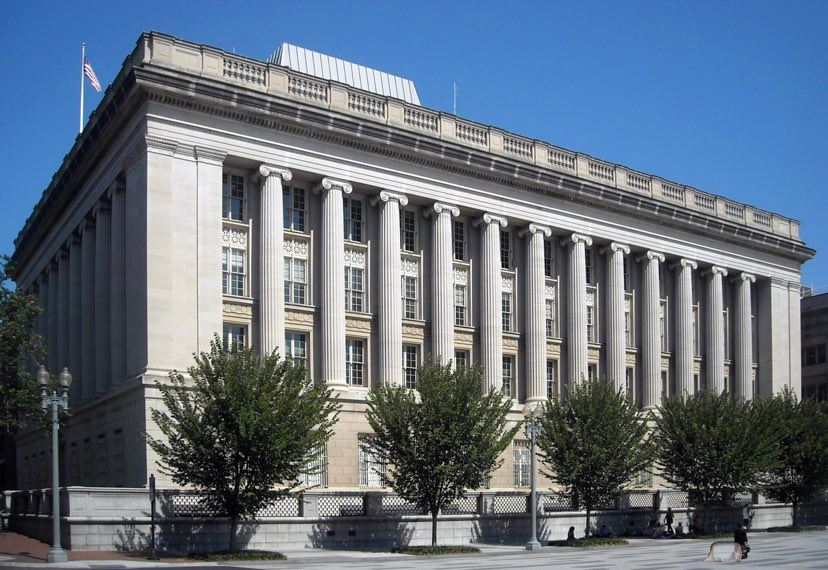
The Freedman's Bank Building in Washington, D.C., previously known as the Treasury Annex, is a contributing property to the Lafayette Square Historic District and Financial Historic District.

In the law regulating historic districts in the United States, a contributing property or contributing resource is any building, object, or structure which adds to the historical integrity or architectural qualities that make the historic district significant. Government agencies, at the state, national, and local level in the United States, have differing definitions of what constitutes a contributing property but there are common characteristics. Local laws often regulate the changes that can be made to contributing structures within designated historic districts. The first local ordinances dealing with the alteration of buildings within historic districts was enacted in Charleston, South Carolina, in 1931.

Properties within a historic district fall into one of two types of property: contributing and non-contributing. A contributing property, such as a 19th-century mansion, helps make a historic district historic, while a non-contributing property, such as a modern medical clinic, does not. The contributing properties are key to a historic district's historic associations, historic architectural qualities, or archaeological qualities. A property can change from contributing to non-contributing and vice versa if significant alterations take place.

== History ==
According to the National Park Service, the first instance of law dealing with contributing properties in local historic districts was enacted in 1931 by the city of Charleston, South Carolina; it designated the "Old and Historic District." The ordinance declared that buildings in the district could not have changes made to architectural features that were visible from the street. By the mid-1930s, other U.S. cities followed Charleston's lead. An amendment to the Louisiana Constitution led to the 1937 creation of the Vieux Carre Commission, which was charged with protecting and preserving the French Quarter in the city of New Orleans. The city passed a local ordinance that set standards to regulate changes within the quarter. Other sources, such as the Columbia Law Review in 1963, indicate differing dates for the preservation ordinances in both Charleston and New Orleans.

The Columbia Law Review gave dates of 1925 for the New Orleans laws and 1924 for Charleston. The same publication claimed that these two cities were the only cities with historic district zoning until Alexandria, Virginia adopted an ordinance in 1946. The National Park Service appears to refute this.

In 1939, the city of San Antonio, Texas, enacted an ordinance to protect the area of La Villita, the original Mexican village marketplace. In 1941 the authority of local design controls on buildings within historic districts was being challenged in court. In City of New Orleans vs Pergament (198 La. 852, 5 So. 2d 129 (1941)), Louisiana state appellate courts ruled that the design and demolition controls were valid within defined historic districts. Beginning in the mid-1950s, controls that once applied only to buildings within historic districts were extended to individual landmark structures. The United States Congress adopted legislation in 1950 that declared the Georgetown neighborhood in Washington, D.C. a historic district and protected. By 1965, 51 American communities had adopted preservation ordinances. In 1976 the National Historic Preservation Act was passed by Congress. By 1998, more than 2,300 U.S. towns, cities and villages had enacted historic preservation ordinances.

== Definition ==
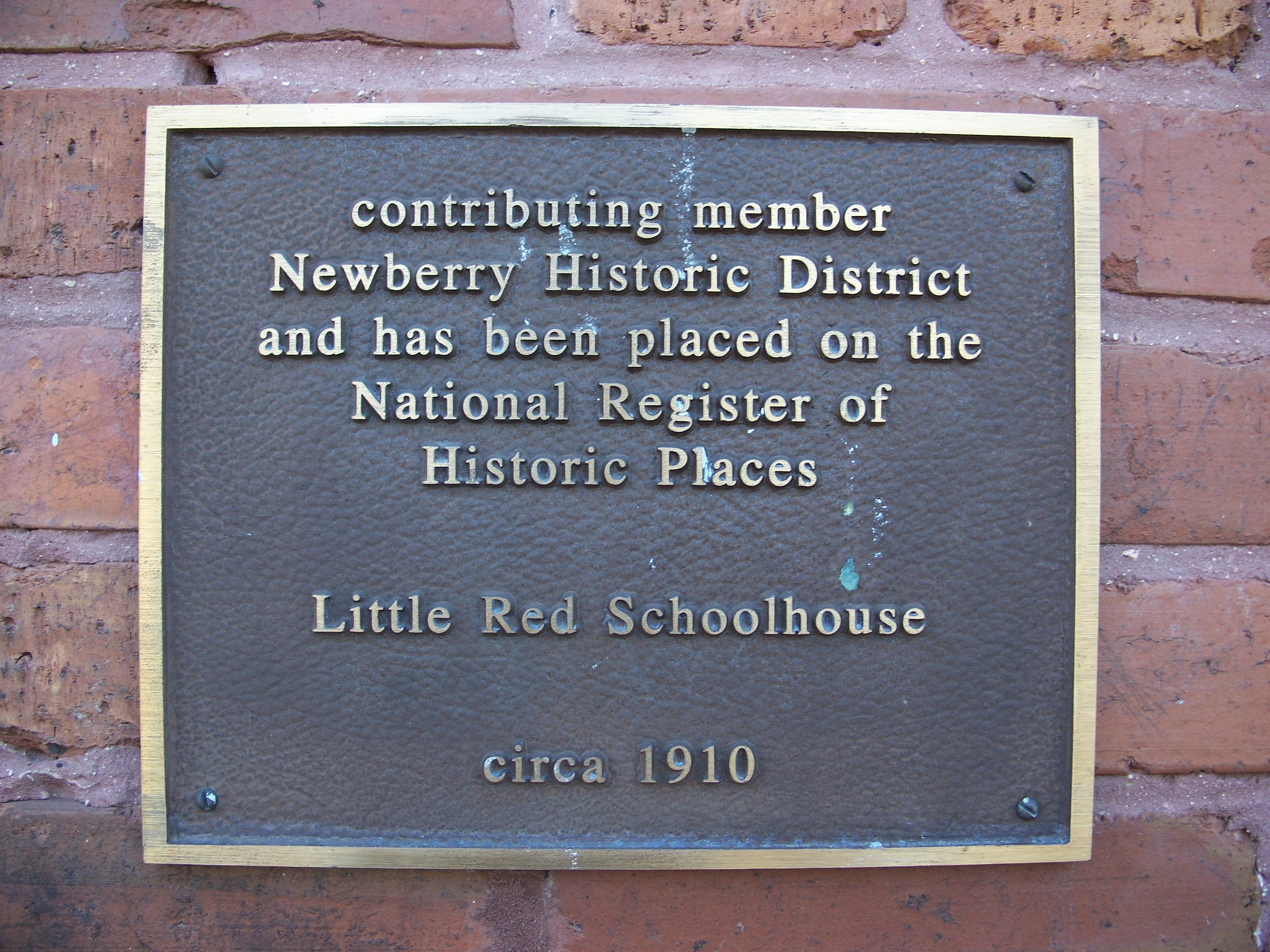
Plaque acknowledging Little Red Schoolhouse as a contributing property to Newberry Historic District in Newberry, Florida

Contributing properties are defined through historic district or historic preservation zoning laws, usually at the local level. Zoning ordinances pertaining to historic districts are designed to maintain a district's historic character by controlling demolition and alteration to existing properties. In historic preservation law, a contributing property is any building, structure, object or site within the boundaries of the district that contributes to its historic associations, historic architectural qualities or archaeological qualities of a historic district. It can be any property, structure or object that adds to the historic integrity or architectural qualities that make the historic district, either local or federal, significant. Definitions vary but, in general, they maintain the same characteristics. Another key aspect of a contributing property is historic integrity. Significant alterations to a property can sever its physical connections with the past, lowering its historic integrity. Contributing properties are integral parts of the historic context and character of a historic district. A property listed as a contributing member of a historic district meets National Register criteria and qualifies for all benefits afforded a property or site listed individually on the National Register of Historic Places.

Each property within a National Register historic district — contributing or non-contributing — is classified as one of four property types: building, object, structure, or site.

== Contributing versus non-contributing ==
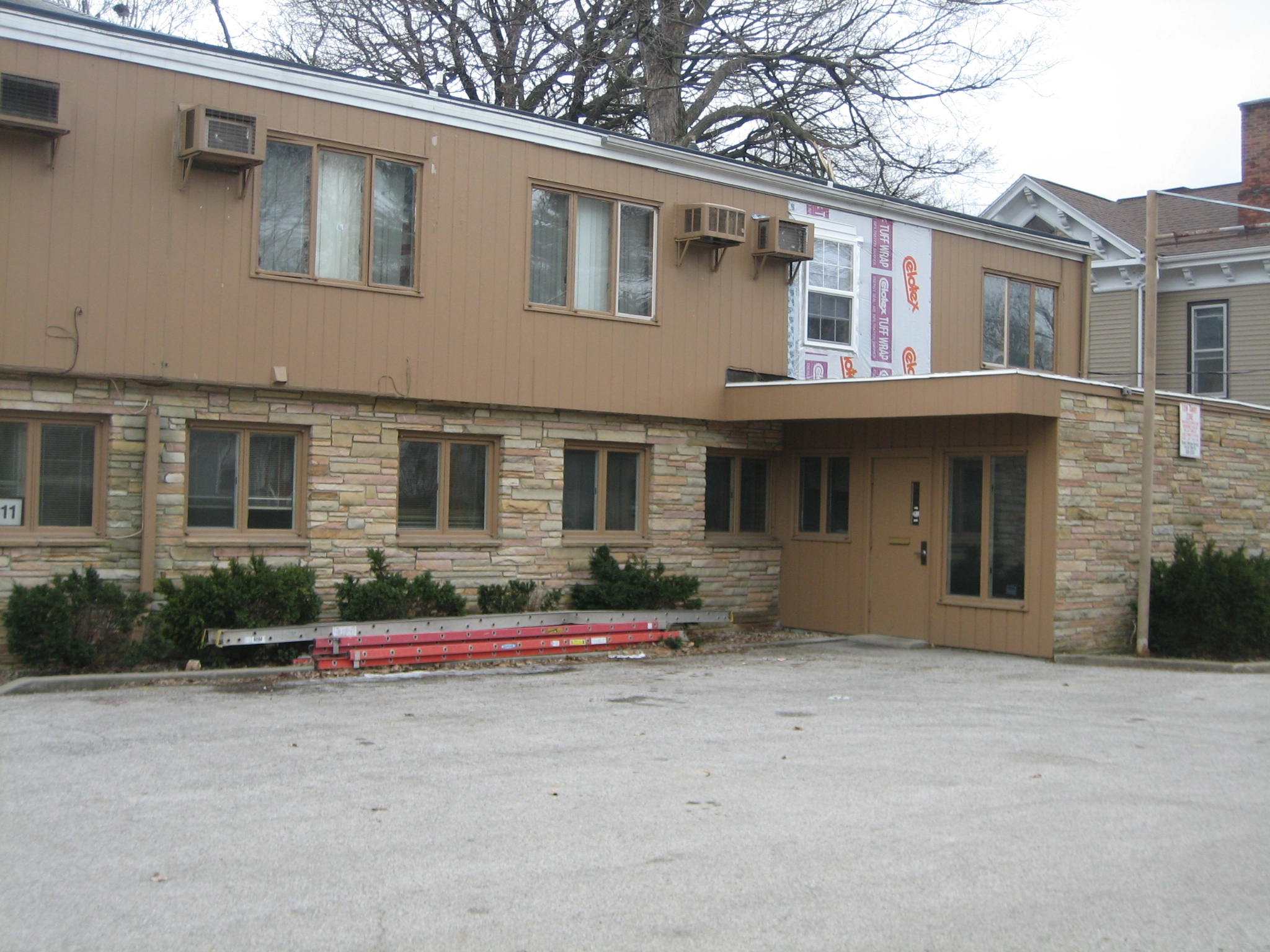
This medical clinic building in the East Grove Street District in Bloomington, Illinois is an example of a non-contributing property.

The difference between contributing property and non-contributing property can at times be ambiguous. In particular, American historic districts nominated to the National Register of Historic Places before 1980 have few records of non-contributing structures. State Historic Preservation Offices conduct surveys to determine the historical character of structures in historic districts. Districts nominated to the National Register of Historic Places after 1980 usually list those structures considered non-contributing.

As a general rule, a contributing property helps make a historic district historic. A well-preserved 19th-century mansion will generally contribute to a district, while a modern gas station generally will not. Historic buildings identified as contributing properties can become non-contributing properties within historic districts if major alterations have taken place. Sometimes, an act as simple as re-siding a historic home can damage its historic integrity and render it non-contributing. In some cases, damage to the historic integrity of a structure is reversible, while other times the historic nature of a building has been so "severely compromised" as to be irreversible. For example, in the East Grove Street District in Bloomington, Illinois, contributing properties include the Queen Anne-style George H. Cox House (1886) and the Arts and Crafts-style H.W. Kelley House (1906), and non-contributing properties include the Italianate-style George Brand House (1886), whose original exterior has been covered with a sun room and asbestos siding, and a 1950s physician's office built in a style radically different from the surrounding neighborhood.
