= Papillon Soo Soo =

British actress and model

- Soo Soo in 2022
- Born: 1961 (age 64–65); England, United Kingdom
- Other name: Papillon Soo Lam
- Occupations: Actress, model
- Known for: A View to a Kill (1985); Full Metal Jacket (1987)

Papillon Soo Soo (also credited as Papillon Soo Lam; born 1961) is a British actress and model. She appeared as Pan Ho in the James Bond film A View to a Kill (1985) and played a Vietnamese sex worker in Stanley Kubrick's Full Metal Jacket (1987).

== Early life and modeling ==
Soo Soo was born in England to parents of French and Chinese ancestry and spent part of her youth in Australia. She studied law before pursuing a modeling career, which included work featured in Vogue.

In a 2026 interview with footwear label Lili Curia, Soo Soo recalled that, while studying law in London, she had visited a fortune teller at Camden Market who predicted she would become famous. She said a photographer later approached her about a film role. According to her account, the photographer introduced her to Barbara Broccoli and Albert R. Broccoli, and she subsequently met director John Glen. She was offered the part of Pan Ho in A View to a Kill, despite having no previous acting experience.

== Acting career ==
=== Film roles ===
Soo Soo made her feature-film debut in the 1985 James Bond film A View to a Kill, playing Pan Ho. She later said the production had cast her partly because of her appearance, which the producers believed complemented that of Grace Jones, who played May Day.

In Full Metal Jacket (1987), Soo Soo played a sex worker who approaches two American Marines in Da Nang. The character's dialogue, including the phrase "Me so horny", was sampled in 2 Live Crew's song "Me So Horny" and Sir Mix-a-Lot's "Baby Got Back".

Soo Soo described her casting for Kubrick's film in interviews published in 2004 and 2026. She said that she encountered an acquaintance from the Bond production in the building where she lived in West Hampstead; he told her about auditions for a Vietnam War film. She then contacted the casting team, including Leon Vitali, and met Kubrick for a filmed audition. In the 2004 interview, she stated that she had filmed a nude scene with Matthew Modine that was not included in the finished film.

She played a waitress in the 1992 science-fiction film Split Second, starring Rutger Hauer. The same film was released in France under the title Killer Instinct.

=== Other screen work ===
Soo Soo was credited as a tai chi performer in an episode of the television comedy The Return of Shelley in 1989. Under the name Papillon Soo Lam, she also appeared in Anna Thew's 1993 experimental short Cling Film.

She appeared in the Cosmic Chi segment of Chinese for Beginners (2002), a four-part series of short films made for Channel 4 by filmmaker Rosa Fong. The segment examines the concept of chi through a mock-documentary presentation.

== Later modeling ==
Soo Soo returned to modeling, joining the agency Grey, and appeared in the 2026 campaign film Lili's Opening Night, produced for footwear brand Lili Curia, in which she portrayed a makeup artist. In an accompanying interview, she discussed the role of costume in her performances and recalled that her character's shoes helped determine her movements in Full Metal Jacket.

== Selected filmography ==
Year	Production	Role	Notes
1985	A View to a Kill	Pan Ho	Feature-film debut
1987	Full Metal Jacket	Da Nang sex worker	
1989	The Return of Shelley	Tai chi performer	Television series; one episode
1992	Split Second	Waitress	Released in France as Killer Instinct
1993	Cling Film	Performer	Experimental short; credited as Papillon Soo Lam
2002	Chinese for Beginners	Herself / Cosmic Chi presenter	Channel 4 short-film series
