= Mac Daddy =

Mac Daddy may refer to:

- MacDaddy, a slang term for a pimp, which has come to mean a virile man
- Mac Daddy, a member of the rap duo Kris Kross
- "Mac Daddy", an episode of Foster's Home for Imaginary Friends
- Ozone Mac Daddy Bi, a French two-place paraglider design

== See also ==
- Mack Daddy, an album by the rapper Sir Mix-a-Lot
