= East Grove Street District =

Historic district in Illinois, United States

- East Grove Street District-Bloomington
- U.S. National Register of Historic Places
- U.S. Historic district
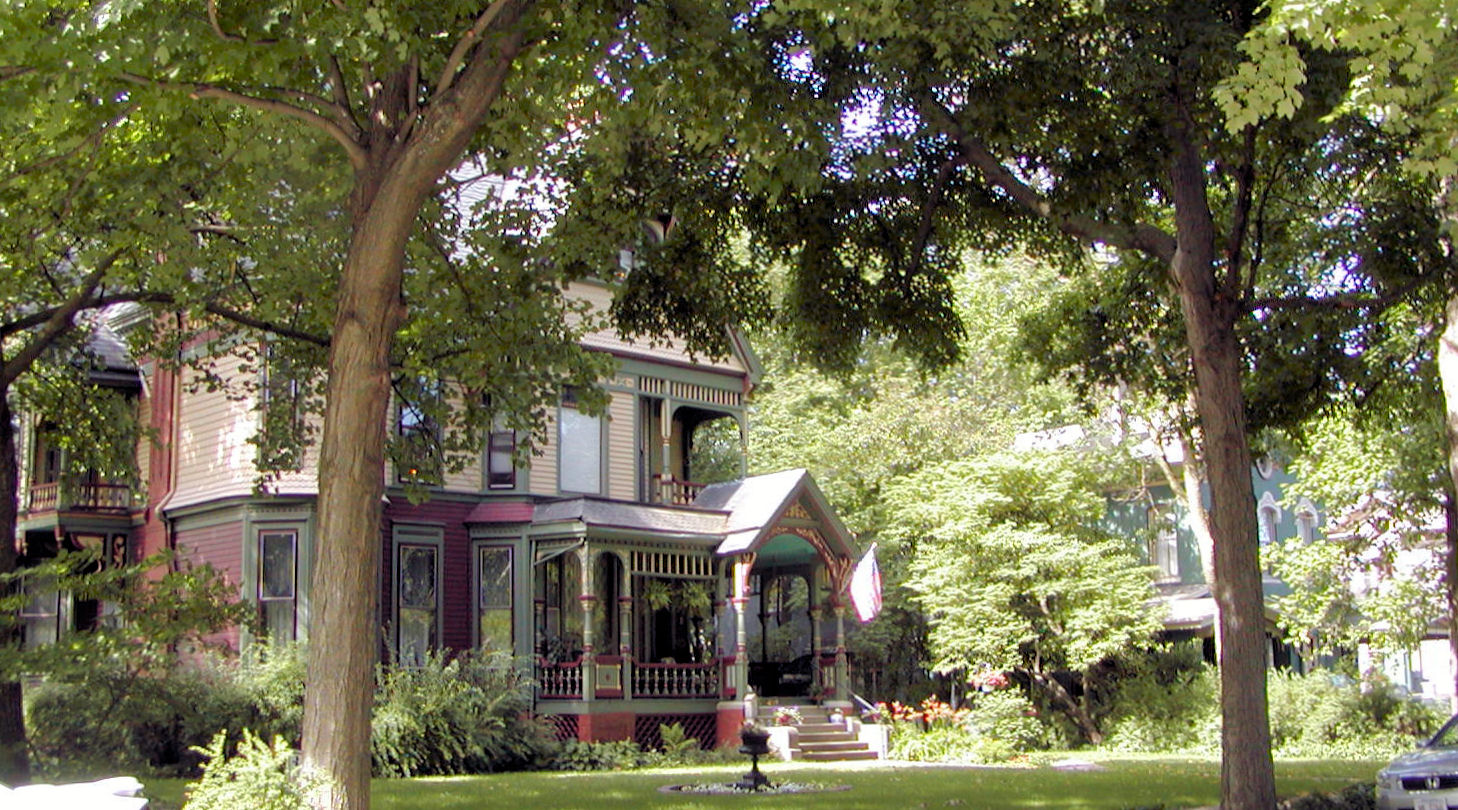
- Some of the homes in the East Grove Street District

- Location within Illinois Location within the United States
- Location: 400-700 E. Grove St., Bloomington, Illinois
- Coordinates: 40°28′40.5″N 88°59′17″W
- Area: 9.7 acres (3.9 ha)
- Built: Various
- Architectural style: Queen Anne
- NRHP reference No.: 86003176
- Added to NRHP: February 26, 1987

The East Grove Street District is a residential historic district located on the 400 through 700 blocks of East Grove Street in Bloomington, Illinois. The district includes 43 houses and apartment buildings, 25 of which are considered contributing buildings. The houses in the district were built between 1855 and 1915 for many of Bloomington's upper middle class residents. Due to a building boom between 1880 and 1900, the then-popular Queen Anne style is the most prevalent in the district. Other popular architectural styles in the district include Greek Revival homes from the 1850s, Italianate homes built between 1860 and 1880, and Arts and Crafts homes built in the 1900s.

The district was added to the National Register of Historic Places on February 26, 1987.
