= Kid Sensation =

American rapper

- Born: Stephen Spence c. 1971 (age 54–55); Seattle, Washington, United States
- Genres: Hip hop
- Occupations: Rapper, record producer, singer
- Years active: 1987–1996, 2009-present
- Labels: A&M Records, Ichiban, Nastymix, Xola Music
- Website: www.xolamusic.com

Xola Malik (formerly Stephen Spence) (born c. 1971), best known by his stage name Kid Sensation, is an American rapper. Born and raised in Seattle, Washington, Spence made his debut as a guest rapper featured on Sir Mix-a-Lot's album Swass, where he appeared on the track "Rippn'".

Spence has sold over one million units during his hip hop career, and has hosted hip-hop based shows such as Yo! MTV Raps and BET's Rap City.

== Biography ==
=== Kid Sensation ===
Spence released his debut album, Rollin' With Number One, on July 2, 1990 on the Nastymix record label. Several videos were released from the album. "Prisoner of Ignorance", which goes into detail about a young man's life of crime, shows Spence rapping from an electric chair and a jail cell. Spence also released the song "Seatown Ballers" and "Skin 2 Skin" as singles from this CD.

Two years later, Spence released his follow up album The Power of Rhyme, also on Nastymix Records. A single, "The Weekend", was the only single officially released from the record. Then-Seattle Mariners outfielder, Ken Griffey Jr., performed on the track, "The Way I Swing."

In 1995, Spence left Nastymix Records and record his third album, Seatown Funk on Ichiban International. The title track was the only single released from the CD.

=== Xola Malik ===
Spence retired his Kid Sensation moniker in the mid 1990s, and was later known as Xola. He went into music production, where he produced music for Jackie Jackson of the Jackson 5, former Seattle Seahawks running back Shaun Alexander's local FSN show, and for the Seattle Mariners and Seattle Seahawks. He formed Xola Music, where he recorded ads and jingles for various professional sports teams (Green Bay Packers, San Antonio Spurs) along with some voice-over work. He recorded a track for Ken Griffey Jr. called "Back Home" in 2009. Xola also began acting in various commercials, and made his big screen debut in the movie, Safety Not Guaranteed.

Malik currently lives in Tacoma, Washington. He has re-recorded and re-released his previous Kid Sensation albums without profanity. His latest CDs are Songs for Change (2010), Seasons (2012) and Looking Up (2016); the latter containing a collaboration track with Sir Mix-a-Lot, titled "Love and Loyalty".

== Albums ==
List of albums
Title	Album details
The Power Of Rhyme	Released: April 28, 1992; Label: Nastymix Records, Emerald City Records, Ichiban; Format: CD, cassette, LP, digital download
Rollin' With Number One	Released: 1990; Label: Nastymix Records, A&M Records; Format: CD, cassette, LP, digital download
Seatown Funk	Released: April 25, 1995; Label: Ichiban; Format: CD, cassette, LP, digital download
A.K.A. Mista K-Sen	Released: October 1, 1996; Label: Ichiban; Format: CD, cassette, LP, digital download
Back Home	Released: April 21, 2009; Label: Supernova Productions; Format: CD, digital download
Presently Past the Future	Released: October 16, 2020; Label: Save the City Records, Supernova Productions; Format: digital download

=== Singles ===
- 1987 - "Square Dance Rap" / "Ripp'n" (7", Promo)
- 1989 - "Back 2 Boom" / "I S.P.I.T."
- 1989 - "Breakdown" / "Seatown Ballers" (12", Promo)
- 1990 - "Prisoner of Ignorance" (12", Promo)
- 1990 - "Seatown Ballers" (12")
- 1990 - "Skin 2 Skin" (12", Promo)
- 1991 - "Ride The Rhythm" (Single)
- 1992 - "The Weekend" (Single) (2 versions)
- 1995 - "Seatown Funk" / "Gotta Lotta Love" (12")
- 1995 - "What Comes Around Goes Around" (12", Promo)

=== Certifications ===
Country	Certifications	Title	Year
Germany	Gold	Seatown Funk	2002
