= Nations Park =

Baseball complex in Newberry, Florida

Champions Park
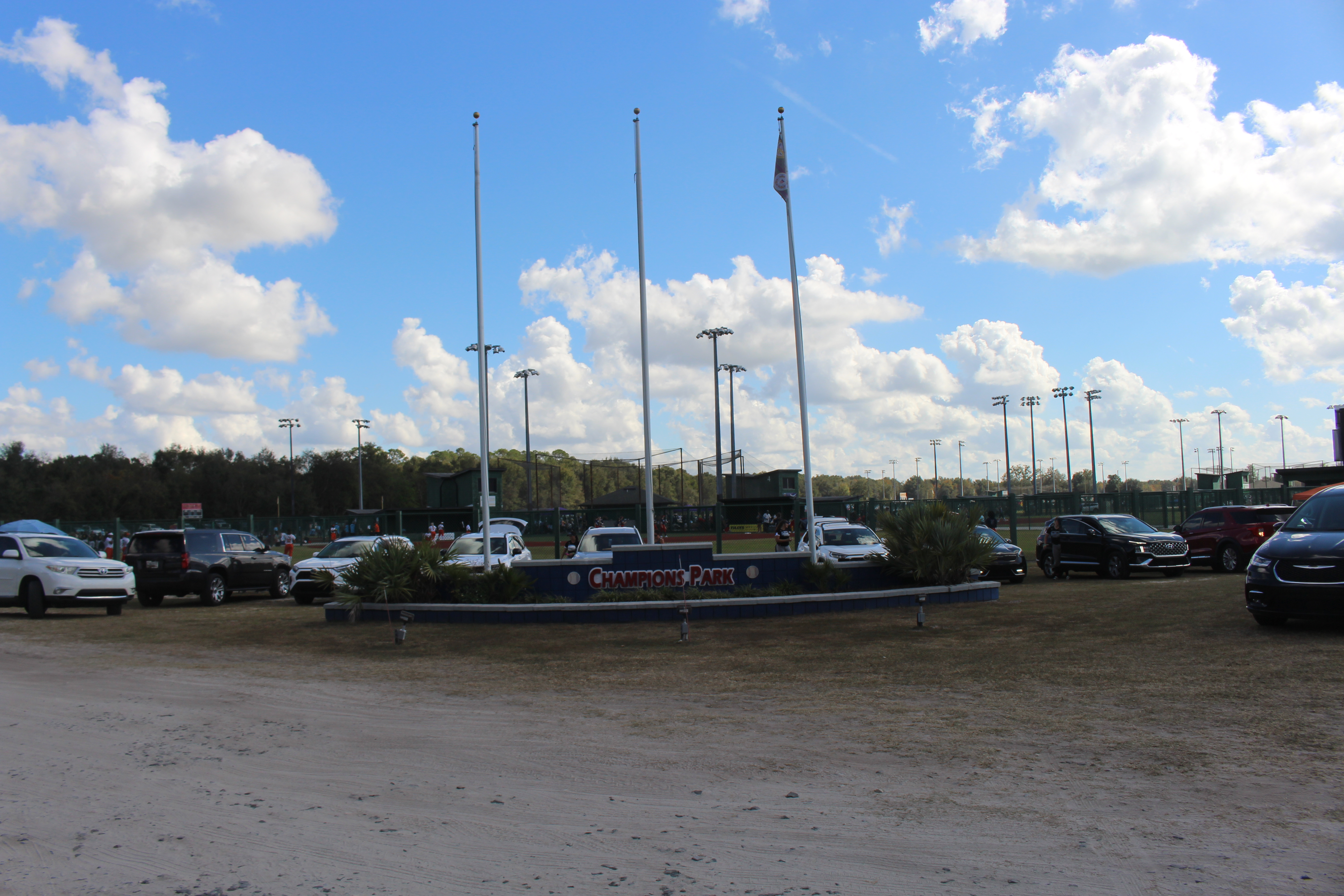
- Interactive map of Champions Park
- Location: Newberry, Florida, US
- Coordinates: 29.620679°N 82.599463°W

Construction
- Groundbreaking: 2011
- Built: 2011/2012
- Opened: June 30, 2012

Website
- www.gainesvillesportscommission.com/facilities/champions-park/

Nations Park is an open invitational baseball tournament complex located in the city of Newberry, Florida. The park was formed with partnerships between the City of Newberry, Nations Baseball Florida Inc., and the Alachua County Tourism Development Board. The facility has 16 stadiums.

== History ==
Lou Presutti, founder of Cooperstown Dreams Park came to the City of Newberry in 2009 to establish the park. It completed construction in 2012, but the grand opening was delayed until March 2013.

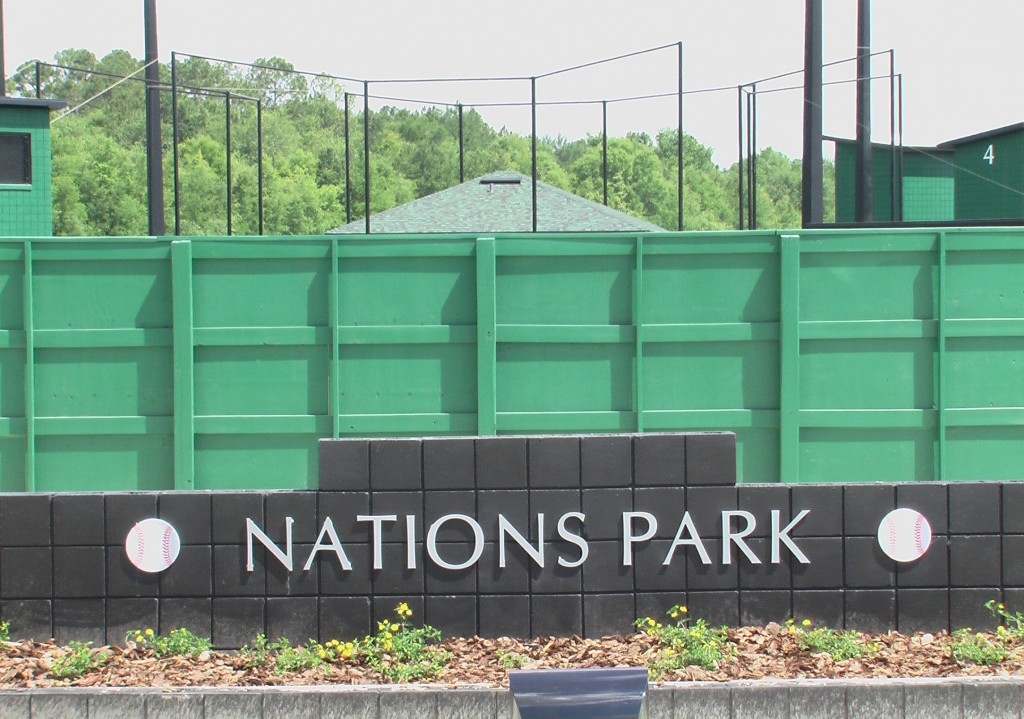
Nations Park Sign

Nations Park is a $7 million baseball tournament complex that is built on 40 acres of land donated by the Davis family on the corner of US 41/27 and SW 30th Ave. In July 2011, the construction of Nations Park came to a brief stop upon discovery of several endangered Gopher Tortoises. The construction remained on hold for several weeks while experts were brought on site to relocate the protected species to a tortoise sanctuary. The 16 fields for Nations Park are completed as of April, 2012 and are ready to play for the inaugural 2012 tournaments.

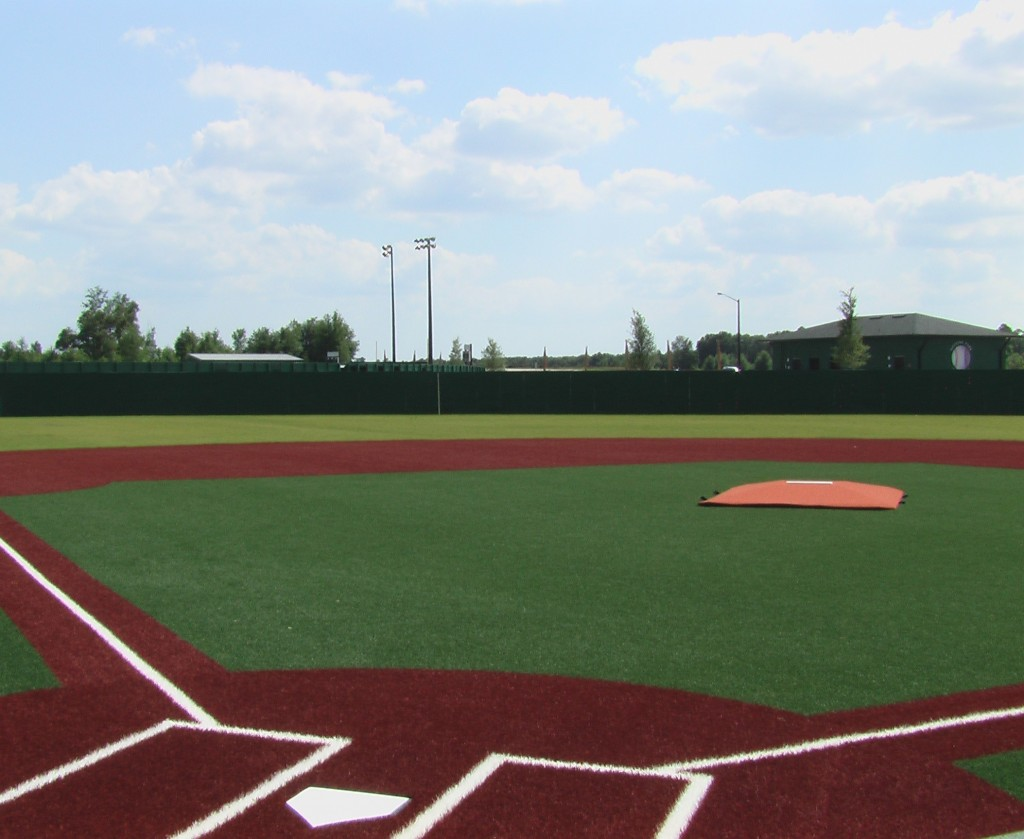
Nations Park Field

== Stadiums ==
The 16 stadiums at Nations Park are built for multiple age groups, 8- to 14-year-old baseball players and 12- to 14-year-old girls fastpitch softball players. The stadiums are fully enclosed and have natural grass outfields and synthetic turf infields. In each stadium, the mounds and basepaths are all adjustable to accompany the correct age group and boasts 220' foot walls and a scorer's tower.

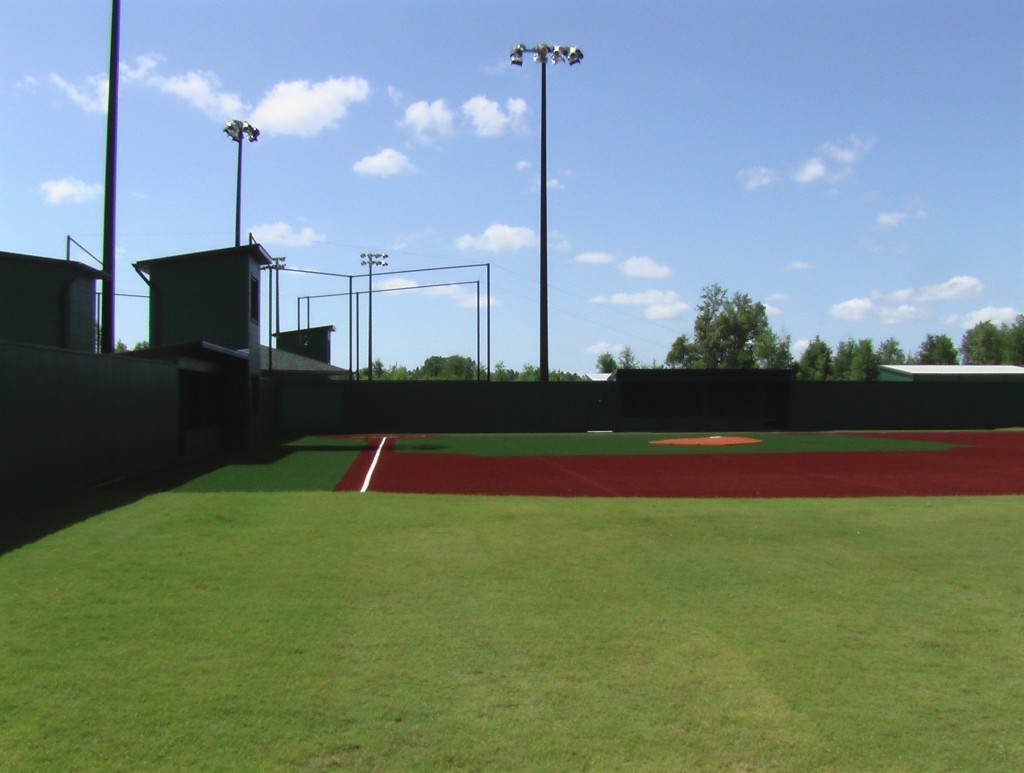
Backdrop of Nations Park Field

== Tournaments ==
Nations Park hosts week-long summer and holiday tournaments for American and Canadian boys' baseball and girls' fastpitch softball teams.

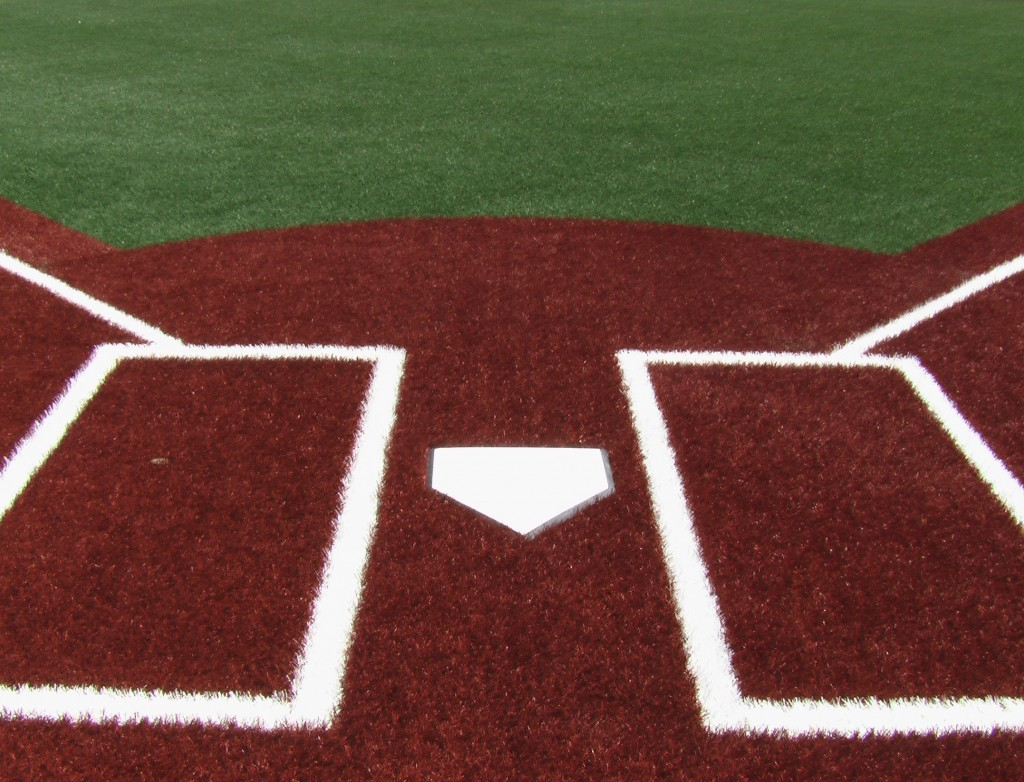
Nations Park Home Plate

== Economic impact ==
The park was expected to have huge economical impact on the small city of Newberry. Nations Park is projected to attract between 90,000 and 120,000 people to Newberry each summer. Once completed, the park may pump an estimated $20 million into the local economy. The park will help generate an additional 50,000 to 80,000 local room nights per year that will supplement the city's tourism revenue.

== Expansion ==
There are plans in the future to expand Nations Park to 32 fields. The city of Newberry, Nations Baseball Florida Inc., and the Alachua County Tourism Development Board will have to gain more tourism revenue needed for an expansion.
