= Chief Boot Knocka =

Studio album by Sir Mix-a-Lot
- Released: July 19, 1994
- Recorded: 1993–1994
- Genre: Hip hop
- Length: 53:52
- Label: American
- Producer: Sir Mix-a-Lot

Sir Mix-a-Lot chronology
| Mack Daddy (1992) | Chief Boot Knocka (1994) | Return of the Bumpasaurus (1996) |

Singles from Chief Boot Knocka
- 1. "Put 'Em on the Glass" Released: July 19, 1994; 2. "Ride" Released: August 23, 1994; 3. "Sleepin' Wit My Fonk" Released: April 4, 1995

Professional ratings
Review scores
| Source | Rating |
|---|---|
| AllMusic | 3/5 stars |
| Christgau's Consumer Guide: Albums of the '90s | (neither) |
| Entertainment Weekly | B |
| Los Angeles Times | 2.5/4 stars |
| Rolling Stone | 3/5 stars |
| The Source | 3/5 stars |
| Spin | 1/3 stars |

Chief Boot Knocka is the fourth studio album by American rapper Sir Mix-a-Lot. It was released on July 19, 1994, via American Recordings. The album was produced by Sir Mix-a-Lot, Eugenius, and Strange.

The album reached number 69 on the Billboard 200 and number 28 on the Top R&B/Hip-Hop Albums charts in the United States. At the 36th Annual Grammy Awards held in 1994, the song "Just da Pimpin' in Me" from the album was nominated for the Grammy Award for Best Rap Solo Performance.

== Track listing ==
All tracks are written by Anthony Ray, except track 1 written with William Collins and George Clinton.

| No. | Title | Length |
|---|---|---|
| 1. | "Sleepin' wit My Fonk" | 4:06 |
| 2. | "Let It Beaounce" | 4:20 |
| 3. | "Ride" | 3:37 |
| 4. | "Take My Stash" | 4:36 |
| 5. | "Brown Shuga" | 4:11 |
| 6. | "What's Real" | 4:15 |
| 7. | "Double da Pleasure" | 0:59 |
| 8. | "Put 'Em on the Glass" | 3:28 |
| 9. | "Chief Boot Knocka" | 4:19 |
| 10. | "Don't Call Me Da Da" | 4:30 |
| 11. | "Nasty Dog" | 4:00 |
| 12. | "Monsta' Mack" | 4:05 |
| 13. | "Just da Pimpin' in Me" | 3:17 |
| 14. | "I Checks My Bank" | 4:09 |
| Total length: | | 53:52 |

Sample credits

- Track 1 contains a sample from "The Pinocchio Theory" as performed by Bootsy's Rubber Band.
- Track 3 contains a sample from "Dazzey Duks" as performed by Duice.
- Track 5 contains a sample from "Spice" as performed by EON.

== Personnel ==
- Anthony "Sir Mix-a-Lot" Ray – vocals, programming, producer, arranger, engineer, mixing, executive producer
- Michael Peter "Flea" Balzary – bass guitar (track 1)
- Michael Powers – guitar (track 6)
- Eugenius – co-producer (tracks: 2, 4, 10), programming, arranger
- Strange – co-producer (tracks: 8, 9)
- Ricardo Frazer – executive producer
- Rick Rubin – executive producer
- Dirk Walter – art direction, design
- Jeri Heiden – art direction
- Annalisa Pessin – photography
- Melvone Farrell – make-up
- Lisa Jayne Storey – hair stylist

== Charts ==
| Chart (1994) | Peak position |
|---|---|
| US Billboard 200 | 69 |
| US Top R&B/Hip-Hop Albums (Billboard) | 28 |
