= Michael Powers (jazz guitarist) =

- Origin: Seattle
- Genres: Jazz, Blues
- Occupation: Musician
- Instrument: Guitar
- Years active: 1970s - present
- Labels: Nastymix Records, Nastymix Jazz, Miramar Productions, Michael Powers Music
- Formerly of: The John Holte Swing Band

Michael Powers is a Seattle-based jazz guitarist who also plays blues. He has achieved national recognition. He has been active from the 1970s. He had chart success with his Perpetual Motion and Frosty the Bluesman albums.

== Background ==
Michael Powers is a graduate of Seattle's Cornish College of the Arts. During his career, Powers has either recorded with or shared billing with artists such as Herbie Hancock, Ray Charles, Gladys Knight, and Sir Mix-a-Lot. By 1996, he had released three albums, Perpetual Motion, First Time Out and Frosty the Blues Man.

In addition to his music, Powers is an avid walker. According to an article "If you want to get to know Seattle, walk through it" in the Seattle Times by Nichole Tsong, it was the death of comedian Bernie Mac and him not taking time out from the schedule that made him change his ways. Powers used to play 300 gigs per year before he slowed down as well as took up walking.

== Career ==
=== 1990s ===
His 1991 Perpetual Motion album along with Rio by Dennis Springer and Bruce Purse by Bruce Purse was reviewed in the September 13 issue of The Gavin Report. Powers was described as a searing guitarist in the Earl Klugh mode. The tracks that were singled out were "Mica", "Midnight in Morocco" and "Perpetual Motion". Also in the same issue, it was shown that his album had moved up from 34 to 31 on the Adult Alternative chart and had moved up from 29 to 27 on the Commercial Adult Alternative chart.

Powers played on the Mack Daddy album by Sir Mix-a-Lot which was released in 1992.

Backed by Jack Toker on drums and Clipper Anderson on bass, Powers was booked to appear at the Met on Thursday, April 11, at 8 p.m.

His album Frosty the Bluesman was reviewed in the December 5, 1996 edition of the Dallas Observer. The reviewer said that the album had good music in it but it didn't illuminate the meaning of the season. The album made the Billboard Blues Albums chart. It spent a week on the chart, peaking at no. 15 on December 14, 1996.

=== 2000s ===
Powers and Seattle jazz band Pearl Django were booked to appear at the Kent Senior Activity Center in Seattle on 25 June 2009. This was to be Powers' second appearance as he had appeared the previous year. Due to fans requesting he come back for the next event, event coordinator Helena Reynolds booked him in again.

Powers and his backup group consisting of Dave Austin on drums and Eddy Ferguson on bass were booked to give a free concert on 19 December 2010 at the Marine View Presbyterian Church in Northeast Tacoma.

Powers was booked as a main attraction for the KBAC Juneteenth Celebration and Festival on Saturday, June 17, 2017.

=== 2020s ===
In February 2024, Powers was booked to appear at the Marshall Hall on a Monday program which was sponsored by ASUPS Student Programs.

On July 19, 2024, Powers was booked to appear at the Quarterdeck for the Des Moines Legacy Foundation 25th anniversary sponsored show.
