= Seminar (album) =

Studio album by Sir Mix-a-Lot
- Released: October 17, 1989
- Studio: Robert Lang (Shoreline, Washington)
- Genre: Hip hop
- Length: 44:27
- Label: Nastymix; American
- Producer: Sir Mix-a-Lot

Sir Mix-a-Lot chronology
Swass (1988)	Seminar (1989)	Mack Daddy (1992)

Singles from Seminar
- 1. "Beepers" Released: September 25, 1989; 2. "My Hooptie" Released: April 2, 1990; 3. "I Got Game" Released: August 28, 1990

Professional ratings
Review scores
Source	Rating
AllMusic	3/5 stars
RapReviews	7.5/10
The Rolling Stone Album Guide	3/5 stars

Seminar is the second studio album by American rapper Sir Mix-a-Lot. It was released on October 17, 1989, via Nastymix and was produced by Sir Mix-a-Lot. The album peaked at number 67 on the Billboard 200, number 25 on the Top R&B/Hip-Hop Albums, and was certified gold by Recording Industry Association of America. It spawned three singles: "Beepers", which peaked at number 61 on the Hot R&B/Hip-Hop Songs and number 2 on the Hot Rap Songs, "My Hooptie", which peaked at number 49 on the Hot R&B/Hip-Hop Songs and number 7 on the Hot Rap Songs, and "I Got Game", which peaked at number 86 on the Hot R&B/Hip-Hop Songs and number 20 on the Hot Rap Songs.

== Track listing ==
No.	Title	Length
1.	"Seminar"	3:47
2.	"Beepers"	4:17
3.	"National Anthem"	4:28
4.	"My Hooptie"	4:46
5.	"Gortex"	3:46
6.	"The (Peek-a-Boo) Game"	4:43
7.	"I Got Game"	4:56
8.	"I'll Roll You Up"	4:29
9.	"Something About My Benzo"	4:29
10.	"My Bad Side"	4:46
Total length:		44:27

=== Sample credits ===
- Track 1 contains elements from "Irresistible Bitch" by Prince (1983)
- Track 2 contains elements from "Batdance" by Prince (1989)
- Track 3 contains elements from "The Star-Spangled Banner" by Francis Scott Key & John Stafford Smith (1814)
- Track 4 contains elements from "Posse on Broadway" by Sir Mix-a-Lot (1988) and "I Ain't Tha 1" by N.W.A (1988)
- Track 6 contains elements from "Peek-a-Boo" by Siouxsie and the Banshees (1988) (the Siouxsie and the Banshees' sample was edited out on further editions). Also contains elements from "Sexuality" by Prince.
- Track 7 contains elements from "Hard to Get" by Rick James (1982)
- Track 8 contains elements from "Swass" by Sir Mix-a-Lot (1988), "The New Style" by Beastie Boys (1986), "Posse on Broadway" by Sir Mix-a-Lot (1988), "Al-Naafiysh (The Soul) (B-Side)" by Hashim (1983), and "Hard Times" by Run-DMC (1984)
- Track 10 contains elements from "Rebel Without a Pause" by Public Enemy (1987) and "Change the Beat (Female Version)" by Beside (1982)

== Personnel ==
- Anthony Ray - performer, producer, engineering, programming
- Ed Locke - executive producer
- Ron McMaster - mastering
- Heather J. Morrison - vocals (track 6)
- Jana Marie Doniger - vocals (track 6)
- Jennifer Wells - vocals (track 6)

== Charts ==
=== Weekly charts ===
Chart (1989)	Peak position
US Billboard 200	67
US Top R&B/Hip-Hop Albums (Billboard)	25

=== Year-end charts ===
Chart (1990)	Position
US Top R&B/Hip-Hop Albums (Billboard)	38

=== Singles ===
Year	Song	Peak positions	
Year	Song	Hot R&B/Hip-Hop Songs	Hot Rap Songs
1989	"Beepers"	61	2
1990	"My Hooptie"	49	7
1990	"I Got Game"	86	20

== Certifications ==
Region	Certification	Certified units/Sales	Date
United States (RIAA)	Gold	500,000	May 7, 1990
