= Return of the Bumpasaurus =

Studio album by Sir Mix-a-Lot
- Released: August 27, 1996
- Recorded: 1996
- Venues: The Comedy Store (Los Angeles, CA)
- Studio: Mix-a-Lot (Auburn, WA)
- Genre: Hip hop
- Length: 1:09:14
- Label: American
- Producers: Sir Mix-a-Lot (also exec.); Funk Daddy; Mike Kumagai; Quaze

Sir Mix-a-Lot chronology
Chief Boot Knocka (1994)	Return of the Bumpasaurus (1996)	Daddy's Home (2003)

Singles from Return of the Bumpasaurus
- 1. "Jump on It" Released: July 23, 1996

Return of the Bumpasaurus is the fifth studio album by American rapper Sir Mix-a-Lot. It was released on August 27, 1996, via American Recordings.

The recording sessions took place at Mix-a-Lot Studios in Auburn, with Chris Rock recorded live at The Comedy Store in Los Angeles on March 27, 1996. The album was produced by Quaze, Mike Kumagai, Funk Daddy, and Sir Mix-a-Lot, who also served as executive producer with Ricardo Frazer and Rick Rubin. It features guest appearances from Amy Dorsey, Jackers, Anetta Perry, Barney "Soul Dog" Huggins, and Michele Jennings.

The album peaked at number 123 on the Billboard 200 and number 55 on the Top R&B/Hip-Hop Albums in the United States. Its lead single "Jump on It" made it to No. 97 on the Billboard Hot 100, No. 89 on the Hot R&B/Hip-Hop Songs, No. 92 on the R&B/Hip-Hop Streaming Songs, No. 27 on the Hot Rap Songs, No. 35 on the Rhythmic Airplay and No. 37 on the Dance Singles Sales in the US.

== Critical reception ==
Professional ratings
Review scores
Source	Rating
AllMusic	3/5 stars
The Commercial Appeal	2.5/4 stars
The Encyclopedia of Popular Music	2/5 stars
Entertainment Weekly	C+
Los Angeles Times	3/4 stars
Muzik	1/5 stars
Pitchfork	7.4/10
The Village Voice	(1-star Honorable Mention)

Cheo Hodari Coker of the Los Angeles Times called the album "chock-full of the high beat-per-minute jams and molasses-thick grooves that made the self-proclaimed 'J.R. Ewing' of the Seattle rap scene a multimillionaire in the first place". Robert Christgau of The Village Voice called it "stupid, funky" and highlighted songs "Jump on It" and "Bark Like You Want It". Nisid Hajari of Entertainment Weekly concluded: "unfortunately, too many cuts on Return of the Bumpasaurus reach back only one decade instead of two, settling for tiny perkiness that's more Cameo than George Clinton". J. D. Considine of The Baltimore Sun wrote that "most of the sounds here are decidedly second-hand, adding no fresh flavor to the bass-derived sound Mix-A-Lot has peddled from the start".

== Track listing ==
No.	Title	Writer(s)	Producer(s)	Length
1.	"You Can Have Her" (featuring Chris Rock)	Anthony Ray	Mike Kumagai	5:19
2.	"Da Bomb" (featuring Amy Dorsey)	Amy Dorsey		0:50
3.	"Buckin' My Horse"	Ray	Sir Mix-a-Lot	4:28
4.	"Mob Style" (featuring Jackers)	Ray; A.R.T.; E-Dawg; Chris Jackson	Quaze	4:30
5.	"Top Ten List"	Ray		2:06
6.	"Man U Luv ta Hate"	Ray	Sir Mix-a-Lot	4:24
7.	"Bark Like You Want It"	Ray	Sir Mix-a-Lot	3:20
8.	"Bumpasaurus Cometh"	Ray	Sir Mix-a-Lot	1:23
9.	"Bumpasaurus" (featuring Anetta Perry)	Ray	Quaze	4:42
10.	"Denial" (featuring Amy Dorsey)	Dorsey		1:02
11.	"Aunt Thomasina" (featuring Amy Dorsey)	Ray	Mike Kumagai	4:37
12.	"Jump on It"	Ray; Jerry Lordan; Clifton Chase; Cheryl Lorraine Cook; Sylvia Robinson; Michael Anthony Wright	Sir Mix-a-Lot	5:00
13.	"Aintsta"	Ray	Sir Mix-a-Lot	4:18
14.	"Sag" (featuring Barney "Soul Dog" Huggins and Michele Jennings)	Ray	Funk Daddy	4:40
15.	"Message to a Drag Artist"	Ray		2:31
16.	"Lead Yo Horse" (featuring Jackers)	Ray; M. Bradford; Jackson	Quaze	4:14
17.	"Playthang"	Ray	Funk Daddy	4:30
18.	"Funk fo da Blvd."	Ray; Fury; Bookie; Attitude Adjuster	Quaze	3:37
19.	"Slide"	Ray; E-Dawg	Mike Kumagai	3:44
Total length:				1:09:14

== Charts ==
Chart (1996)	Peak position
US Billboard 200	123
US Top R&B/Hip-Hop Albums (Billboard)	55
