= John Holte =

American musician (1943–2003)

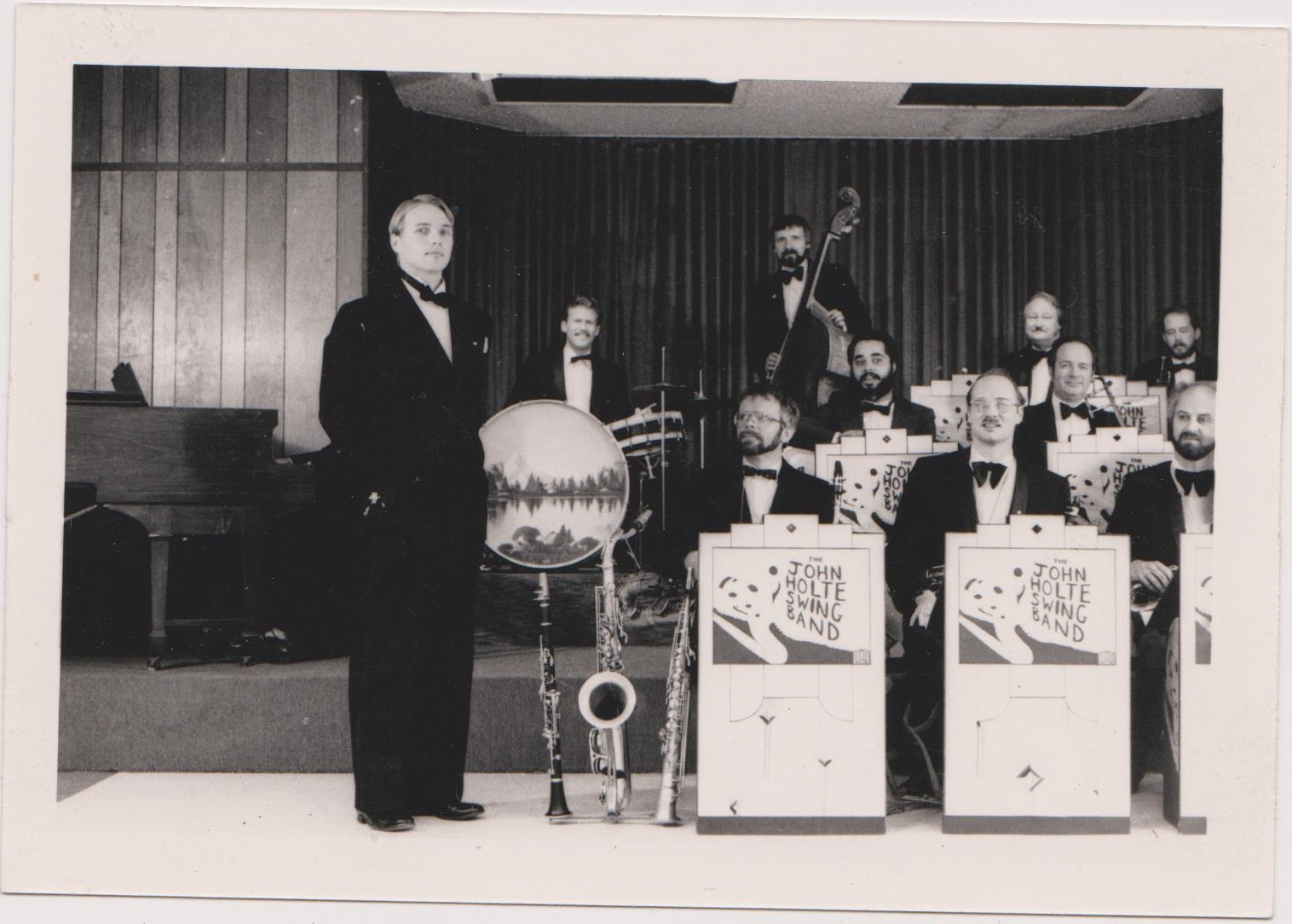
- John Holte Swing Band 1984, Holte seated front middle, Dennis Nyback standing
- Born: December 10, 1943; Cambridge, Massachusetts, U.S.
- Died: January 8, 2003 (aged 59); Seattle, Washington, U.S.
- Occupation: Musician

John Holte (December 10, 1943 – January 8, 2003) was an American musician, who led the West Coast Swing Band revival of the 1970s by creating the New Deal Rhythm Band in Seattle in 1972. He played reeds and also wrote arrangements. He later created other Seattle Big Bands and was active in the Seattle music scene up to his death.

== New Deal Rhythm Band ==
Holte created the New Deal Rhythm Band in Seattle in 1972. First playing at the Inside Passage tavern in Seattle. The band's first singer was Phil Shallat. Also in the original line up were Ron Nations and Louie Healy (reeds), Craig Schroeder (trumpet), Mark Larson (drums), Lon Alsman (bass) and Bill Owens (guitar), The filmmaker Larry Stair, in 1973, made a short film about Joe Venuti titled Thank You Joe that featured Venuti appearing with the New Deal Rhythm Band at the District Tavern in Seattle. The band at that time featured Michael Trullinger on drums. After Phil Shallat left the band in 1974 he was replaced by the singer Cheryl Bentyne. October 20 to November 1 they played the Greenwood Inn in Beaverton, Oregon. Shortly after that Jerry Ranger joined the band, taking the place of John Holte. In July 1976, The New Deal Rhythm Band, led by Jerry Ranger, were at the Center Four Lounge of the Ramada Inn in Portland, Oregon. Under the leadership of Jerry Ranger the New Deal Rhythm Band went national, touring across America, and recording three LPs. Cheryl Bentyne left the group to join the Manhattan Transfer in 1979. After Bentyne left the group the singer Mary Cleere Haran sang with the band in 1979 playing casinos in Nevada and Texas.

== Swingland Express ==
After leaving the New Deal Rhythm Band, Holte formed a new big band, The Swingland Express, featuring the singer Odessa Swan. In February, 1976, Swingland Express was featured in a fund raiser for the NW Film Center as part of a gala event of film and performance at the Portland Art Museum. The 1937 film Shall We Dance, starring Fred Astaire and Ginger Rogers, was screened. It was followed by Swingland Express playing for listening and dancing. Swingland Express featured Jeff Hughes on cornet, Ronnie Pierce and John Draper on reeds, and Buck Evans on piano. In May 1976 Hughes, and Evans as "The Big Two," and also as part of the "Salmon City Seven," and finally as part of the Swingland Express, performed on KBOO radio. The band got a Summer long booking at the Windjammer restaurant in Seattle in 1976 adding the singer Howard Hays. In the fall of 1976 it began an extended Monday night gig at the G Note Tavern at 300 N 85th St in Seattle. In March 1977 Jeff Hughes and the Swingland Express performed on KBOO radio on the "Mouldy Figge" show hosted by Val Golding. In 1977 it gigged around the Pacific Northwest including stops at the Earth Tavern in Portland, Oregon. Swingland Express disbanded in 1980 when Jeff Hughes moved back to Boston for grad school. Hughes later played in Ray Smith's Paramount Jazz Band, as well as The Canal Street Jazz Band in Madrid, Spain, and recorded with the Riverside Jazz Band, all the time working as a member of the research staff of the Marine Biological Laboratory in Woods Hole. Odessa Swan continued her career as a Seattle jazz singer appearing with Dr. Roscoe and the Red Hots, Johnny Draper's Jive Bombers and her group, Le Jazz Hot

== The John Holte Swing Band ==
In 1979 Holte formed The John Holte Swing band featuring the singer Dennis Nyback. On May 13 it began an extended Sunday night gig at the University Towers Hotel. The University Tower Hotel had opened as the Edmond Meany Hotelin 1931. It is 16 stories high and one of few large examples Art Deco left in Seattle, it is currently called the Hotel Deca. On November 18 it began an extended Sunday night gig at the Old Ballard Firehouse, 5429 Russell Ave NW. In On February 28, 1980 the band began a year long Thursday night gig at the Norselander (300 3rd Ave West) Seattle. It played The Bite of Seattle in 1986. The 1984 edition of the John Holte Swing Band featured the guitarist Michael Powers. It played Bumbershoot in 1986, 1987 and 1988.

== The Radio Rhythm Orchestra ==
In the late 1980s, Holte created his last big band, The Radio Rhythm Orchestra. In the Spring of 1992 it had an extended engagement at Night Mary's, a club on Capitol Hill, in Seattle, featuring the singer Maureen Mershon. He led the Radio Rhythm Orchestra up to his death. The band is still active and is currently being led by the bass player Pete Leinonen. A CD of John Holte music, dating back to 1979, was released in 2005. It features Holte with his big bands and also in small combo settings. The current edition of the Radio Rhythm Orchestra features many of Holtes original arrangements including "Deco Rhythm," "At the Mummy's Ball." "Emerald City Boogie," "Blue Flame Jump," and many others.
