= Newberry Historic District (Newberry, Florida) =

Historic district in Florida, United States

- U.S. National Register of Historic Places
- U.S. Historic district
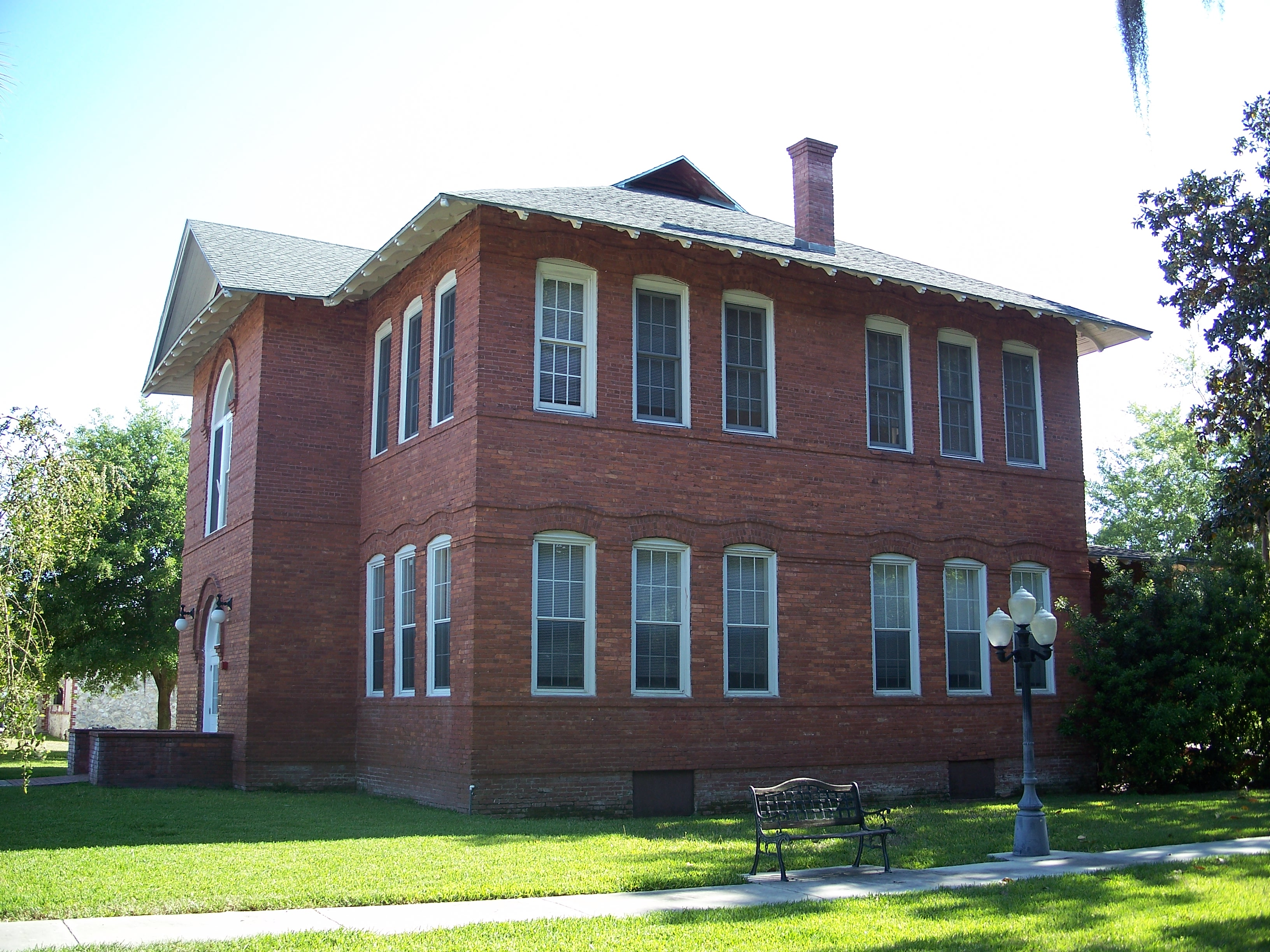
- Little Red Schoolhouse, a contributing property to the Newberry Historic District

- Location within Florida Location within the United States
- Location: Newberry, Florida
- Coordinates: 29°38′45″N 82°36′49″W
- Area: 400 acres (1.6 km^{2})
- NRHP reference No.: 87002150
- Added to NRHP: December 24, 1987

The Newberry Historic District is a U.S. historic district (designated as such on December 24, 1987) located in Newberry, Florida. It encompasses approximately 400 acres (1.6 km^{2}), bounded by Northwest 2nd Avenue, Northwest 2nd Street, Lucile Street, and Northwest 9th Street. It contains 48 historic buildings.
