= Newberry High School (Florida) =

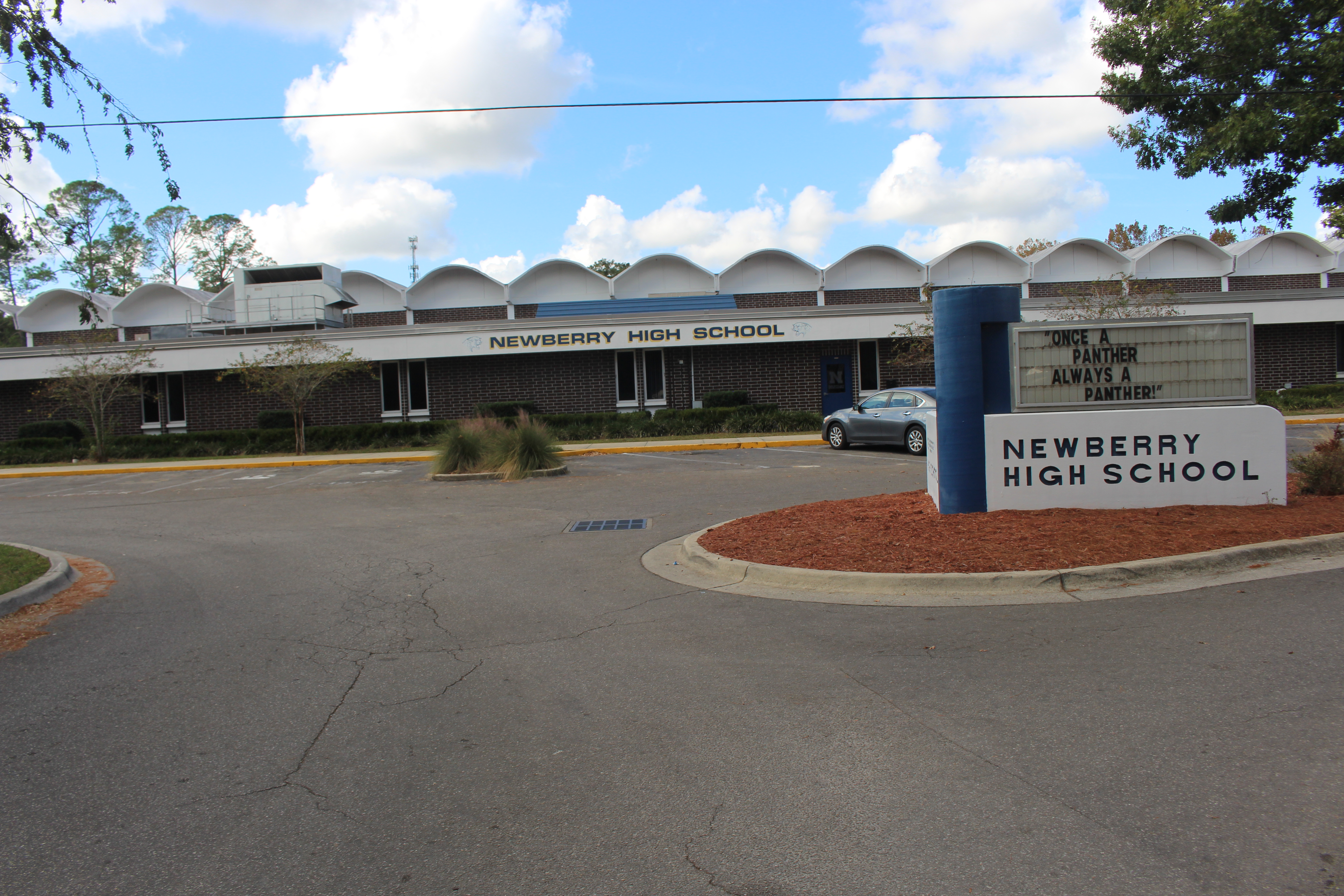

Location
- 400 SW 258th Street; Newberry, Florida 32669; United States
- Coordinates: 29.6427668°N 82.6150328°W

Information
- School type: Public high school
- Motto: Newberry High School is committed to the success of all students.
- School board: Alachua County Public Schools
- Principal: Jill Atchley
- Staff: 28.20 (on an FTE basis)
- Enrollment: 750 (2023–2024)
- Student to teacher ratio: 26.60
- Colors: Royal Blue, Gold, and White
- Mascot: Panthers, Lady Panthers
- Website: Newberry High School

Newberry High School is a 1A-rated public high school located at 400 SW 258th Street in the city of Newberry, Florida. The school offers a magnet program in criminal justice, numerous clubs, and an athletic program. NHS was rated an A school for the 2012–2013 academic year.

== Academics ==
=== Academy of Criminal Justice ===
Newberry High School's Academy of Criminal Justice magnet program was founded by Jackie Whitworth. The curriculum includes classes in law enforcement, self-defense, and forensic investigation. Students participate in "Teen Court", the Sheriff's Explorers program, and the Guardian Ad Litem program. The magnet program is currently directed by Patrick Treese. Former directors of the program include Greg Smith and Jackie Whitworth.

== Extra-curricular activities ==
There are twelve clubs at Newberry High School. The clubs are made up of students in grades 9-12. These activities include:

- Athletics
- Concert Band
- Marching Band
- Chorus/Theater
- SGA, Beta Club
- National Honor Society
- Robotics, Club Unified
- Principal Student Advisory

=== Band ===
The Newberry High School band is called the "Band of Pride". The marching band travels to many competitions throughout August and November. The "Band of Pride" received second place overall at the Florida Marching Band Championships (FMBC) state competition in 2013. The Band of Pride has also been invited to the Memorial Day Parade in 2015. The concert band went to state for MPA district assessment in 2015 and received an overall Superior rating. The Symphonic Band performs several concerts, including Winter and Spring. The band has gone through several changes in leadership within the past couple of years and is now under the direction of James DeRemer who has been there since 2014. In 2016, the Band of Pride played at Leesburg High School, Tarpon Springs High School, Santa Fe High School, and Columbia County High School before they played at the state semi-finals.

== Athletics ==
Newberry High School's mascot is the "Panthers", or "Fighting Panthers". The girls' athletic teams use the name "Lady Panthers". The school offers 11 sports: baseball, basketball, cheerleading, football, golf, soccer, softball, tennis, track and field, volleyball, lacrosse, and weightlifting.

Newberry offers Varsity and Junior Varsity teams in both girls' and boys' basketball.

The high school's cheerleaders are split into the NHS Football Cheerleaders, the NHS Basketball Cheerleaders, and the NHS Competition Cheerleaders. The school also offers teams for girls' and boys' weightlifting teams, baseball, softball, volleyball, track and field, soccer, lacrosse, and tennis.
