= Baby Got Back =

1992 single by Sir Mix-A-Lot

Single by Sir Mix-a-Lot

from the album Mack Daddy
- B-side: "Cake Boy"/"You Can't Slip"
- Released: May 7, 1992
- Recorded: 1991
- Genre: Hip-hop; dirty rap
- Length: 4:21
- Label: Def American; Reprise
- Songwriter: Sir Mix-a-Lot
- Producers: Sir Mix-a-Lot; Rick Rubin (Note: The CD maxi-single credits Rubin as Executive producer)

Sir Mix-a-Lot singles chronology
"One Time's Got No Case" (1991)	"Baby Got Back" (1992)	"Swap Meet Louie" (1992)

Music video
- "Baby Got Back" on YouTube

Audio sample
- file; help

"Baby Got Back" is a song written, co-produced and recorded by American rapper Sir Mix-a-Lot. Released in May 1992 by Def American and Reprise as the second single from his third album, Mack Daddy (1992), the song samples the 1986 Detroit techno single "Technicolor" by Channel One. At the time of its original release, the song caused controversy because of its outspoken and blatantly sexual lyrics objectifying women, as well as specific references to the buttocks, which some people found objectionable. The song's accompanying music video, directed by Adam Bernstein, was briefly banned by MTV. Mix-a-Lot defended the song as being empowering to curvaceous women who were being shown skinny models as an ideal for beauty.

"Baby Got Back" topped the US Billboard Hot 100, and spent five weeks atop the chart. It was the second best-selling song in the US in 1992. The song was ranked number 17 on VH1's "100 Greatest Songs of Hip Hop" in 2008. In October 2023, Billboard ranked it among the "500 Best Pop Songs of All Time".

== Synopsis ==
The song begins with a spoken word segment involving two presumably thin, white valley girls. In the background, a curvy woman slowly dances in silhouette. One of the two valley girls (dubbed Linda by Amylia Diaz-Dorsey) remarks to her friend, "Oh, my, God Becky, look at her butt! It is so big!" This section ends with Linda saying "she's just so... black!", at which point the verse begins.

The first verse begins with "I like big butts and I cannot lie" and the narrator's attraction to women with large buttocks is a major theme of the song. The second and third verses challenge mainstream norms of beauty with lyrics such as "I ain't talkin' 'bout Playboy/'Cause silicone parts are made for toys" and "So Cosmo says you're fat/Well I ain't down with that!"

The song came from a meeting between Sir Mix-a-Lot and Amylia Dorsey, who saw little representation of full-figured women in media. The idea came from a 1980s-era Budweiser commercial featuring thin, valley girl-esque models of varying ethnicities. They decided to dedicate a song to the opposite, featuring curvy women of color. Mix and Dorsey sought to "broaden the definition of beauty."

Sir Mix-a-Lot commented in a 1992 interview: "The song doesn't just say I like large butts, you know? The song is talking about women who damn near kill themselves to try to look like these beanpole models that you see in Vogue magazine." He explained that most women respond positively to the song's message, especially black women: "They all say, 'About time.'"

The dialogue of actress Papillon Soo Soo saying "Me so horny" is sampled from the 1987 film Full Metal Jacket to complete Sir Mix-a-Lot's lyric, "That butt you got makes..."

In 2014, according to TMZ, Sir Mix-a-Lot said it was Jennifer Lopez's moves as a Fly Girl on the 1990s show In Living Color that first inspired him to write "Baby Got Back".

== Critical reception ==
Larry Flick from Billboard magazine wrote, "First offering from rapper's major-label debut, Mack Daddy, cheekily rhapsodizes about the joys of women with prominent backsides. Cute rhymes and slammin' beats add up to a potential smash at several formats."

J. D. Considine from The Baltimore Sun commented, "In some cases, what's said can be as simple as Sir Mix-a-Lot's assertion 'I like big butts!' in the single 'Baby Got Back'. On the surface, it may seem that all he's doing is expressing an opinion, but there's more to it than Mix-a-Lot's personal preferences. At root, 'Baby Got Back' challenges the dominant standard for physical beauty in our culture, a standard that stresses long legs, slim hips, small buttocks and has no room for women with wide hips or protuberant posteriors. And the fact that 'Baby Got Back' spent five weeks at No. 1 suggests that there are millions who agree with his assessment."

James Bernard from Entertainment Weekly remarked that the song "alternates deftly between a critique of the Cosmo/Playboy narrow-minded – and narrow-hipped – standard of female beauty and a bawdy appreciation of, er, generous rear ends."

In Melody Maker's review of the album, "Baby Got Back" was named "worst of all" and "a hip hop 'Fatty Bum Bum' and – Warning! Warning! – could be a novelty hit."

Mark Coleman from Rolling Stone said the song "celebrates a section of the anatomy long revered by rappers ("beggin' for a piece of that bubble" is a new twist)."

In 2020, Cleveland.com ranked "Baby Got Back" number 24 in their list of the best Billboard Hot 100 No. 1 song of the 1990s. They described it as "the novelty song that never went away", adding, "You could put this on at a wedding today and women will recite the opening word for word before the rap breaks in and everyone (and I mean everyone) joins in. Sir Mix-a-Lot was never shy about playing up the song's "playful" nature, rapping on top of a giant butt in the video."

The song has been cited in demonstrating the limitations of the Bechdel test, which requires that two named women talk to each other about something other than a man in order to be passed. It has been described as passing the test because it begins with a valley girl saying to another "Oh my god, Becky, look at her butt!".

== Chart performance and awards ==
"Baby Got Back" reached number one on the US Billboard Hot 100 chart for five weeks in the summer of 1992, and won a 1993 Grammy Award for Best Rap Solo Performance. In the years following the song's release on the album Mack Daddy, it has continued to appear in many movies, television shows, and commercials, as detailed below. It was ranked number six on VH1's "Greatest Songs of the '90s", and number one on VH1's "Greatest One Hit Wonders of the '90s". In 2017, Rolling Stone magazine ranked it number 64 in their list of "100 Greatest Hip-Hop Songs of All Time". In 2023, Billboard ranked it number 327 in their "500 Best Pop Songs of All Time". Same year, Time Out ranked "Baby Got Back" number 23 in their "The 100 Best Party Songs Ever Made".

== Track listing ==
No.	Title	Length
1.	"Baby Got Back" (album version)	4:21
2.	"Cake Boy"	4:12
3.	"You Can't Slip"	5:05
4.	"Baby Got Back" (Tekno-Metal Edit)	4:20
5.	"Baby Got Back" (Hard B.W.B. Hip Hop Mix)	4:35
6.	"Baby Got Back" (Hurricane Mix)	5:04

== Charts ==
=== Weekly charts ===
Chart (1992–1993)	Peak position
Australia (ARIA)	8
Canada Top Singles (RPM)	89
Germany (GfK)	25
Netherlands (Dutch Top 40)	35
Netherlands (Single Top 100)	31
New Zealand (Recorded Music NZ)	3
Switzerland (Schweizer Hitparade)	39
UK Singles (Official Charts)	56
UK Dance (Music Week)	54
US Billboard Hot 100	1
US Dance Club Songs (Billboard)	5
US Hot R&B/Hip-Hop Songs (Billboard)	27
US Cash Box Top 100	1

=== Year-end charts ===
Chart (1992)	Position
Australia (ARIA)	32
New Zealand (Recorded Music NZ)	47
US Billboard Hot 100	2
US Cash Box Top 100	2

=== Decade-end charts ===
Chart (1990–1999)	Position
US Billboard Hot 100	30

== Certifications ==
Region	Certification	Certified units/sales
Australia (ARIA)	Gold	35,000^{^}
United Kingdom (BPI)	Gold	400,000^{‡}
United States (RIAA)	2× Platinum	2,000,000^{^}
United States (RIAA) Digital download	Gold	2,077,760
^{^} Shipments figures based on certification alone.^{‡} Sales+streaming figures based on certification alone.

== In popular culture ==
In 2019, former governor of Alaska and Republican vice-presidential candidate Sarah Palin performed the song on Fox's The Masked Singer while dressed as a bear.

=== Joe Nichols cover ===
Joe Nichols included a cover of the song on his 2017 album Never Gets Old with spoken-word intro by comedian Darren Knight. The accompanying music video features Sir Mix-A-Lot as a talent show judge sitting through various covers of "Baby Got Back" until Joe Nichols and his band appear on stage performing much to Mix-A-Lot's delight.

=== Glee cover ===
Jonathan Coulton released a cover of "Baby Got Back" during his Thing a Week project in October 2005, with the song being released as part of the first Thing A Week compilation album the next year. Coulton performs the song on acoustic guitar with a gentle and tender melody at odds with the lascivious nature of the lyrics.

Coulton's arrangement of the song was used in a 2013 episode of the musical television series Glee without Coulton's knowledge or permission. Coulton publicly lambasted the show's producers, and alleged that they had even lifted elements from his recording, but claimed that Fox responded that "they're within their legal rights to do this, and that [Coulton] should be happy for the exposure", though Coulton pointed out that he was not credited within the episode. Coulton released his cover of "Baby Got Back" to iTunes, labelling it "a cover of Glee's cover of my cover of Sir Mix-a-Lot's song", with proceeds going to charity. Coulton pursued legal charges against the show's producers, but ultimately dropped them, deciding a seeming victory in the court of public opinion was "a good enough win." The controversy was the inspiration for a season 5 episode of The Good Wife entitled "Goliath and David".

=== Related songs ===
In a 2000 interview, Sir Mix-a-Lot reflected, "There's always butt songs. Hell, I got the idea sitting up here listening to old Parliament records: Motor Booty Affair. Black men like butts. That's the bottom line." The song is part of a tradition of 1970s–90s African-American music celebrating the female posterior, including "Da Butt", "Rump Shaker", and "Shake Your Groove Thing".

In 2014, Trinidadian-American rapper Nicki Minaj sampled "Baby Got Back", including some of its verses, for her hit "Anaconda", from the album The Pinkprint. The song has been viewed by some as a diss track, in answer to "Baby Got Back". Whereas Sir Mix-a-Lot "sings the praises of the Black female body, but his focus remains on the pleasure it provides for the appreciative Black man", Minaj raps from the perspective of the unnamed woman, "giving voice to the woman who profits from her callipygian physique".

In the Horrible Histories television series, a parody song uses the rhythm and call-and-response structure of "Baby Got Back" to retell the failures of over-ambitious royal flagships: The White Ship (1120), The Mary Rose (1545) and The Vasa (1628).

== See also ==
- 1992 in music
- Hot 100 number-one hits of 1992 (USA)
- Cultural history of the buttocks
