= Gatorback Cycle Park =

Coordinates: 29.6933°N 82.5594°W

Gatorback Cycle Park is an off-road motorcycle park located northeast of the city of Newberry, FL. This track has gained fame among off-road motorcycle enthusiasts and hosts several American Motorcyclist Association motocross events throughout the year, including the famous Mini O's. It hosted a round of the AMA Motocross Championship from 1983 to 1997.

The facility has come under some criticism over the past ten years regarding safety, as several fatalities have occurred during the races. The most recent were in 2006 when a 16-year-old boy and a 39-year-old woman died in two separate ATV crashes two weeks apart. Also, at Mini O's in 2012, there was a crash where the rider on a dirt bike died. The track was criticized for resuming racing immediately after the crash and "destroying a crime scene" by the Alachua County Sheriff's Office.
