= Newberry, Florida =

- City
- City of Newberry
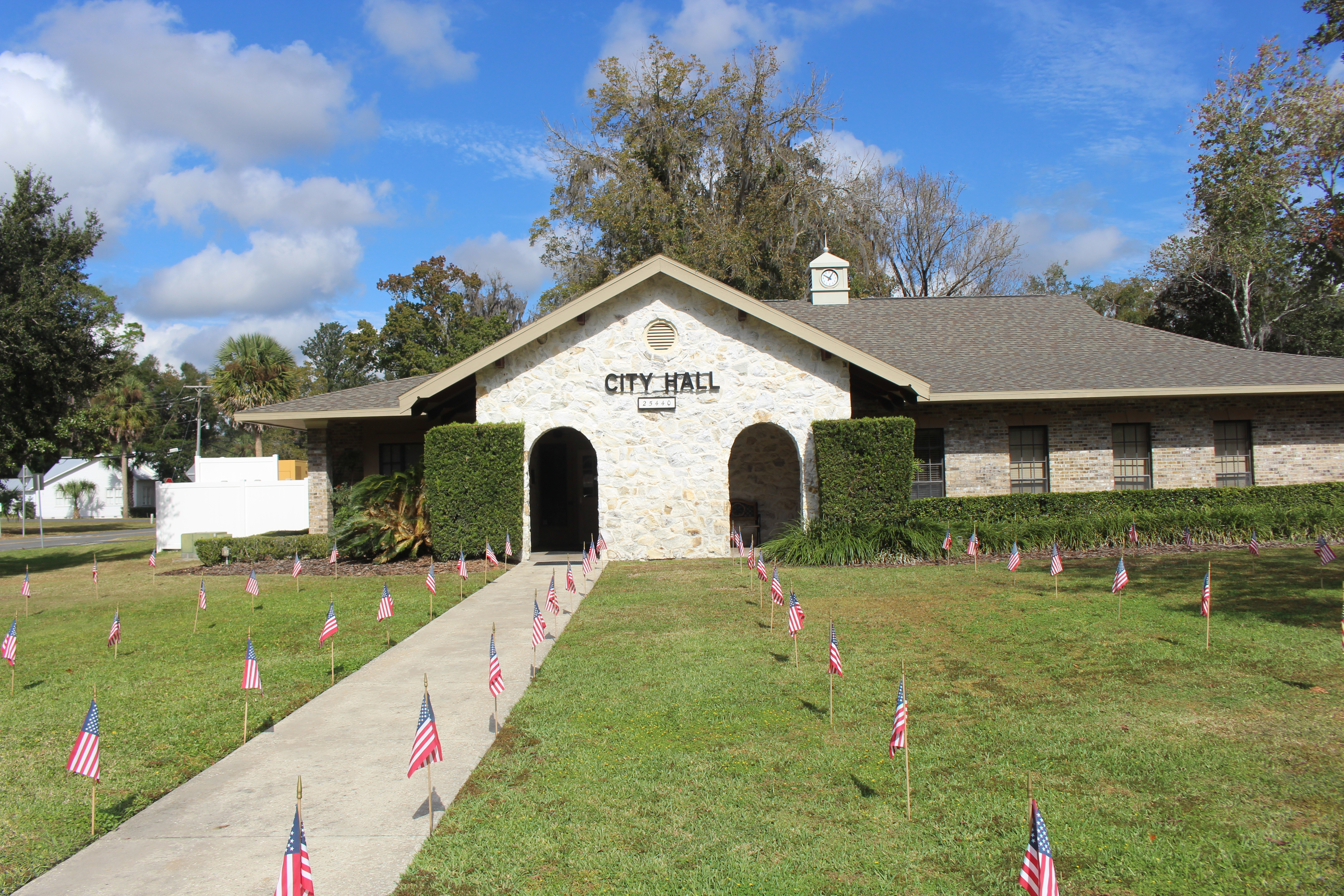
- Newberry City Hall

- Seal Logo

- Location in Alachua County and the state of Florida
- Coordinates: 29°38′25″N 82°36′31″W
- Country: United States
- State: Florida
- County: Alachua
- Established: 1895

Government
  - Type: Commission-Manager

Area
  - Total: 59.90 sq mi (155.15 km^{2})
  - Land: 58.85 sq mi (152.42 km^{2})
  - Water: 1.05 sq mi (2.73 km^{2})
- Elevation: 85 ft (26 m)

Population (2020)
  - Total: 7,342
  - Density: 124.8/sq mi (48.17/km^{2})
- Time zone: UTC-5 (Eastern (EST))
  - Summer (DST): UTC-4 (EDT)
- ZIP code: 32669
- Area code: 352
- FIPS code: 12-48200
- GNIS feature ID: 2404370
- Website: www.newberryfl.gov

Newberry is a city located in the southwest corner of Alachua County, Florida, United States. The population was 7,342 as of the 2020 Census, up from 4,950 at the 2010 census. It is part of the Gainesville, Florida Metropolitan Statistical Area. Much of the city borders neighboring Gilchrist County, to the west.

Developed as a mining and railroad town in the late 19th century, since the mid-20th century it has developed new commodity crops for agriculture. In 1984 Freddie Warmack was elected as its first black mayor, gaining 60% of the white vote. The city's historic district is listed on the National Register of Historic Places. Since 2019, Newberry's city commission has included a National Development Officer for the right-wing John Birch Society.

== History ==
Newberry developed as a mining town after phosphate was discovered in the western part of Alachua County in the 1880s. In 1893, the Savannah, Florida, and Western Railway was extended southward from High Springs to Newberry, leading to its development as a railroad town and trading center. A post office established in March 1894 was named Newton, but changed to Newberry in August of that year.

In this period, racial violence against blacks rose in Alachua County, where lynchings took place to enforce white supremacy. A total of 21 people, 19 of them black, were lynched in the county between 1891 and 1926.

By 1896, there were fourteen mines operating nearby. Newberry had hotels, boarding houses, and saloons to accommodate the area's transient and sometimes unruly population. The demand for phosphate ended abruptly in 1914, when war was declared against Germany, the principal customer for Newberry's phosphate. This caused a loss of jobs in the area, and social tensions rose.

The community turned from phosphate production to agriculture and new commodity crops. It was particularly successful in producing watermelons. The Watermelon Festival, first held in 1946, a year after the end of World War II, continues to be celebrated as an annual event.

Race relations have improved in the town since the late 20th century. Residents elected Freddie Warmack as its first black mayor in 1984; he gained 60% of the white vote.

In 1987, Newberry's Historic District was officially listed on the National Register of Historic Places.

=== Lynchings ===
On August 19, 1916, what are called the Newberry Six lynchings took place, when three black men, including a minister, and two black women were killed by a white mob in a mass hanging; another man was shot. They had allegedly helped the escape of another African-American man, Boisy Long. He was accused of hog stealing and shooting two men. Filmmaker Patricia Hilliard-Nunn, who is working on a documentary about African Americans in Alachua County, has studied these events. She believes that another three persons may have been lynched in association with the Boisy Long incident, either hanged, as were the Six, or shot to death.

== Geography ==
According to the United States Census Bureau, the city has a total area of 54.6 square miles (141.3 km^{2}), of which 53.5 square miles (138.6 km^{2}) is land and 1.0 square mile (2.7 km^{2}) (1.93%) is water.

== Demographics ==
Historical population
Census	Pop.	Note	%±
1910	816		—
1920	917		12.4%
1930	766		−16.5%
1940	735		−4.0%
1950	873		18.8%
1960	1,105		26.6%
1970	1,247		12.9%
1980	1,826		46.4%
1990	1,644		−10.0%
2000	3,316		101.7%
2010	4,950		49.3%
2020	7,342		48.3%
U.S. Decennial Census

=== Racial and ethnic composition ===
Newberry racial composition (Hispanics excluded from racial categories) (NH = Non-Hispanic)
Race	Pop 2010	Pop 2020	% 2010	% 2020
White (NH)	3,719	4,716	75.13%	64.23%
Black or African American (NH)	705	1,019	14.24%	13.88%
Native American or Alaska Native (NH)	7	15	0.14%	0.20%
Asian (NH)	66	147	1.33%	2.00%
Pacific Islander or Native Hawaiian (NH)	1	1	0.02%	0.01%
Some other race (NH)	8	63	0.16%	0.86%
Two or more races/Multiracial (NH)	90	436	1.81%	5.94%
Hispanic or Latino (any race)	354	945	7.15%	12.87%
Total	4,950	7,342		

=== 2020 census ===
As of the 2020 census, Newberry had a population of 7,342. The median age was 36.4 years. 28.3% of residents were under the age of 18 and 13.1% of residents were 65 years of age or older. For every 100 females there were 92.7 males, and for every 100 females age 18 and over there were 90.5 males age 18 and over.

0.0% of residents lived in urban areas, while 100.0% lived in rural areas.

There were 2,611 households in Newberry, of which 42.1% had children under the age of 18 living in them. Of all households, 57.9% were married-couple households, 12.7% were households with a male householder and no spouse or partner present, and 23.0% were households with a female householder and no spouse or partner present. About 19.5% of all households were made up of individuals and 8.2% had someone living alone who was 65 years of age or older.

In the 2020 ACS 5-year estimates, there were 1,385 families residing in the city.

There were 2,796 housing units, of which 6.6% were vacant. The homeowner vacancy rate was 2.1% and the rental vacancy rate was 8.9%.

=== 2010 census ===
As of the 2010 United States census, there were 4,950 people, 1,878 households, and 1,365 families residing in the city.

In 2010, the population density was 92.5 inhabitants per square mile (35.7/km^{2}). There were 2,068 housing units at an average density of 38.7 per square mile (14.9/km^{2}).

In 2010, 37.4% had children under the age of 18 living with them, 55.7% were headed by married couples living together, 13.2% had a female householder with no husband present, and 26.6% were non-families. 22.1% of all households were made up of individuals, and 8.0% were someone living alone who was 65 years of age or older. The average household size was 2.63, and the average family size was 3.07.

In 2010, in the city, the population was spread out, with 25.8% under the age of 18, 6.9% from 18 to 24, 28.9% from 25 to 44, 27.2% from 45 to 64, and 11.1% who were 65 years of age or older. The median age was 36.5 years. For every 100 females, there were 90.3 males. For every 100 females age 18 and over, there were 87.2 males.

=== Income and poverty ===
For the period 2007–2011, the estimated median annual income for a household in the city was $49,623, and the median income for a family was $62,461. Male full-time workers had a median income of $50,990 versus $36,417 for females. The per capita income for the city was $22,851. About 11.5% of families and 18.4% of the population were below the poverty line, including 32.2% of those under age 18 and 12.7% of those age 65 or over.

== Notable places ==
The City of Newberry is home to both Champions Park of Newberry and the Easton-Newberry Sports Complex. Attracting more than 30,000 visitors annually for games and tournaments, Champions Park (originally Nations Park) was completed in June 2013 and renamed in May 2014. Located in North Central Florida, Champions Park of Newberry is located near Gainesville, Florida. Champions Park has 16 fields.

Easton Newberry Sports Complex, a shared-use facility that combines the Easton Foundation Archery Center with the City of Newberry multiuse Recreation Department, and was selected by the United States Olympic Committee as a Community Olympic Development Program. Easton Newberry Sports Complex is one of only 10 programs nationwide to be designated by the USOC for its ability to train coaches and athletes, and provide venues in the sport of archery. The Easton-Newberry Sports Complex serves as a regional archery center for all skill levels, teaching archers the National Training System of USA Archery and giving all interested archers opportunities for advancement. With 100 acres of multipurpose facilities – including dedicated areas for archery training and events – the site currently reaches 6,200 people each year.

Gatorback Cycle Park is an off-road motorcycle park located northeast of the city.

== Education ==
Newberry is served by the Alachua County Public Schools, which operates an elementary school, a middle school and Newberry High School in the city, and the Alachua County Library District, which operates a branch library in the city.
