= Mack Daddy =

Studio album by Sir Mix-a-Lot
- Released: February 4, 1992
- Recorded: 1991
- Genre: Hip-hop
- Length: 60:12
- Labels: Def American; Rhyme Cartel
- Producers: Sir Mix-a-Lot; Rick Rubin; Nate Fox; Strange

Sir Mix-a-Lot chronology
Seminar (1989)	Mack Daddy (1992)	Chief Boot Knocka (1994)

Singles from Mack Daddy
- 1. "One Time's Got No Case" Released: 1991; 2. "Baby Got Back" Released: May 7, 1992; 3. "Swap Meet Louie" Released: 1992

Professional ratings
Review scores
Source	Rating
AllMusic	3/5 stars
Robert Christgau	(neither)
Entertainment Weekly	B
Q	3/5 stars
RapReviews	8/10
Rolling Stone	4/5 stars

"Baby Got Back"
Sir Mix-a-Lot's "Baby Got Back" from Mack Daddy

Mack Daddy is the third studio album by American rapper Sir Mix-a-Lot. It was released on February 4, 1992, on Def American Recordings. The album is notable for the hit single "Baby Got Back".

== Track listing ==
All songs written by Sir Mix-a-Lot, except where noted.

1. "One Time's Got No Case" (Mix-a-Lot, Wonder) – 4:17
2. "Mack Daddy" – 4:22
3. "Baby Got Back" – 4:21
4. "Swap Meet Louie" – 4:31
5. "Seattle Ain't Bullshittin'" – 5:33
6. "Lockjaw" – 4:19
7. "The Boss Is Back" – 4:15
8. "Testarossa" (Mix-a-Lot, I. Hamid, T. Will) – 5:08
9. "A Rapper's Reputation" – 5:02
10. "Sprung on the Cat" – 4:30
11. "The Jack Back" (Mix-a-Lot, Wicked One) – 4:56
12. "I'm Your New God" – 4:43
13. "No Holds Barred" (Mix-a-Lot, Slave) – 4:05

Note: A typo across many digital providers has "Seattle" written as "Seatlle" for the title of "Seattle Ain't Bullshittin'".

== Samples ==
One Time's Got No Case

- "You Haven't Done Nothin'" by Stevie Wonder
- "Hot Pants (Bonus Beats)" by Bobby Byrd

Baby Got Back

- "Technicolor" by Channel One

Lockjaw (went viral between late 2024 and early 2025)

- "There Was a Time" by James Brown
- "Zero Bars (Mr. Smith)" by Tubeway Army
- "Housequake" by Prince

A Rapper's Reputation

- "Head" by Prince

The Jack Back

- "Sport" by Lightnin' Rod

No Holds Barred

- "Funky Drummer" by James Brown
- "Baby Sinister" by Slave

== Personnel ==
- Sir Mix-a-Lot: Vocals, keyboards, drum programming
- Michael Powers: Guitars on tracks 2, 4, & 12
- Eugenius: Producer, arranger, programming
- Punish: Scratching on track 6
- Amy Dorsey: Female vocals on tracks 3 & 4
- The Wicked One: Additional vocals on track 11

== Production ==
- Executive Producer: Rick Rubin
- Arranged by Sir Mix-a-Lot
- Produced by Sir Mix-a-Lot & Rick Rubin, with co-production by Nate Fox (tracks 1 & 7) and Strange (tracks 8–10 & 12)
- Engineered & Mixed by Sir Mix-a-Lot

== Charts ==
=== Weekly charts ===
Chart (1992)	Peak position
Canada Top Albums/CDs (RPM)	62
US Billboard 200	9
US Top R&B/Hip-Hop Albums (Billboard)	19

=== Year-end charts ===
Chart (1992)	Position
US Billboard 200	38
US Top R&B/Hip-Hop Albums (Billboard)	27

== Certifications ==
Region	Certification	Certified units/sales
United States (RIAA)	Platinum	1,000,000^{^}
^{^} Shipments figures based on certification alone.
