= Posse on Broadway =

Single by Sir Mix-a-Lot

from the album Swass
- B-side: "Sir-Money-By-Lot"
- Released: September 25, 1988
- Recorded: March–August 1988
- Studio: Lawson Studios, Seattle, Washington
- Genre: Golden age hip hop
- Length: 2:38 (Album Version – 4:21)
- Label: Nastymix
- Songwriter: Anthony Ray
- Producer: Sir Mix-a-Lot

Sir Mix-a-Lot singles chronology
"Square Dance Rap" (1986)	"Posse on Broadway" (1988)	"Baby Like a Angel" (1989)

"Posse on Broadway" is a hip hop song first recorded by Sir Mix-a-Lot on his 1988 debut album Swass. He also released a music video.

The single is regarded as Mix-a-Lot’s career breakthrough and the first golden age hip-hop record from outside the well-established East Coast, West Coast, and Southern scenes to be nationally embraced.

== Background ==
The song is a day in the life inspired by "an actual night that we actually had" where Mix-a-Lot and his friends cruise their hometown of Seattle. The Broadway in the song is the main drag in Seattle's Capitol Hill neighborhood, a street on which the Mix-a-Lot Posse got "lots of good grip from the 50 series tires".

The song references specific streets and neighborhoods, including Rainier Avenue, "23rd and Jackson" (23rd Avenue S. and S. Jackson Street), a major intersection in Seattle's historically black Central District or "CD", Martin Luther King Jr. Way S., "23rd and Union" (23rd Avenue and E. Union Street), and Broadway. "The college" is Seattle Central College near the East end of the Broadway commercial strip, from which they drive to Taco Bell and later Dick's Drive-In, a local fast food institution and, according to the song, "the place where the cool hang out."

The track's low-frequency bass drum sounds were created by Roland's TR-808 drum machine referred to in the lyrics as the "808 kick-drum". The elongated decay was difficult to capture on the 24-inch tape of the era, and Terry Date, a famous Seattle recording engineer best known for his work with grunge acts, helped achieve the effect.

== Music video ==
The music video was shot on location in Seattle and showcases the city’s South End, Central District and Capitol Hill neighborhoods. Dick’s Drive-In refused permission to shoot any portion of the video at their Broadway location, so the drive-in scenes were shot at Stan’s, another drive-in burger restaurant located a few miles south at the intersection of Rainier Avenue and Dearborn Street.

== Versions and Remixes ==
There are multiple versions of the song: a "Radio Edit", which was played over the radio; the "Thunder Mix, which was included on the Mix-A-Lot compilation album Playlist: The Very Best of Sir Mix-a-Lot; and the "Godzilla Remix Edit", which features Godzilla's signature "roar" and a sample of the guitar riff from David Bowie's "Fame". The Godzilla Mix has slight lyrical differences, most notably Mix-a-Lot referencing the "Gatorback" tires instead of the "50-Series" tires of the original and a reference to vehicle as "the Bistro". British-American rapper MF Doom references the song on the track "Great Day", off Madvillainy, with the line "My posse's on broadway like mama, I want to sing".

== Charts ==
Chart (1988/1989)	Peak position
U.S. Billboard Hot 100	70
U.S. Billboard Hot Black Singles	44
