= Swass =

Studio album by Sir Mix-a-Lot
- Released: September 1, 1988
- Studio: Lawson, Seattle, Washington
- Genre: Hip-hop; electro-funk
- Label: Nastymix; Def American
- Producer: Sir Mix-a-Lot

Sir Mix-a-Lot chronology
Swass (1988)	Seminar (1989)

Singles from Swass
- 1. "Posse on Broadway" Released: 1988; 2. "Rippn'" Released: 1988; 3. "Iron Man" Released: 1989

Professional ratings
Review scores
Source	Rating
AllMusic	3/5 stars
RapReviews	7/10
The Rolling Stone Album Guide	2.5/5 stars

Swass is the debut studio album by the American rapper Sir Mix-a-Lot. It was released in 1988 on Nastymix and re-released on CD by Def American Recordings. The album featured the singles "Posse on Broadway", "Square Dance Rap", "Iron Man" (a rap metal version of the Black Sabbath song featuring the band Metal Church) and "Rippn'". In 1990, the album received a platinum certification by the Recording Industry Association of America.

According to Sir Mix-a-Lot, the word "swass" originally was an inside joke with no meaning in itself. After the album's release, the word came to mean "Some Wild Ass Silly Shit".

The hook of the song "Swass" is reprised in "Don't Cha" by Busta Rhymes and CeeLo Green, becoming a world hit recorded by the Pussycat Dolls.

== Track listing ==
The 1988 vinyl and CD issues on Nastymix Records contained the same track listing. The 1991 CD reissue on Def American Records added two bonus tracks, "Attack on the Stars" and "F the BS".

All tracks are written by Sir Mix-a-Lot, except where noted.

Side A
No.	Title	Length
1.	"Buttermilk Biscuits (Keep On Square Dancin')"	3:32
2.	"Posse on Broadway"	5:01
3.	"Gold"	4:59
4.	"Swass"	4:38
5.	"Rippn'" (with Kid Sensation)	3:54
6.	"Mall Dropper"	0:10

Side B
No.	Title	Writer(s)	Length
7.	"Hip Hop Soldier"		5:35
8.	"Iron Man" (featuring Metal Church)	Sir Mix-a-Lot, Tony Iommi, Ozzy Osbourne, Geezer Butler, Bill Ward	4:10
9.	"Bremelo"		4:10
10.	"Square Dance Rap"		4:16
11.	"Romantic Interlude"		4:00
Total length:			44:55

1991 compact disc
No.	Title	Length
1.	"Buttermilk Biscuits (Keep On Square Dancin')"	3:32
2.	"Posse on Broadway"	5:04
3.	"Gold"	4:55
4.	"Swass"	3:54
5.	"Rippn'" (with Kid Sensation)	3:54
6.	"Attack on the Stars"	4:25
7.	"Mall Dropper"	0:09
8.	"Hip Hop Soldier"	5:21
9.	"Iron Man" (featuring Metal Church)	4:14
10.	"Bremelo"	4:04
11.	"Square Dance Rap"	4:18
12.	"Romantic Interlude"	4:36
13.	"F the BS"	4:42
Total length:		54:03

== Personnel ==
- Anthony Ray - performer, producer, engineering, programming
- Ed Locke - executive producer
- Ron McMaster - mastering

== Samples ==
"Posse on Broadway"

- "Nightclubbing" by Iggy Pop

"Gold"

- "Dopeman" by N.W.A

"Rippin'"

- "Cars" by Gary Numan
- "Numbers" by Kraftwerk
- "Tour de France" by Kraftwerk
- "Push It" by Salt-N-Pepa

"Square Dance Rap"

- "Rock Me Baby" by B.B. King

"F the BS"

- "Chase" by Giorgio Moroder

== Certifications ==
Region	Certification	Certified units/sales
United States (RIAA)	Platinum	1,000,000^{^}
^{^} Shipments figures based on certification alone.

== See also ==
- 1988 in music
