= Sir Mix-a-Lot =

American rapper (born 1963)

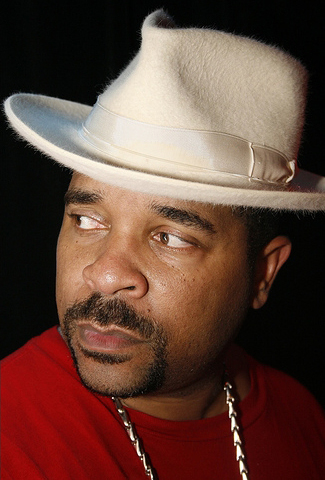
- Sir Mix-a-Lot in 2006

Background information
- Also known as: Bumpasaurus; Prime Minista
- Born: Anthony L. Ray; August 12, 1963 (age 63); Auburn, Washington, U.S.
- Origin: Seattle, Washington, U.S.
- Genres: Hip-hop; electro-funk
- Occupations: Rapper; songwriter; record producer
- Years active: 1981–present
- Labels: Nastymix; Ichiban; American; Artist Direct; BMG
- Website: sirmixalot.com

Anthony L. Ray (born August 12, 1963), better known by his stage name Sir Mix-a-Lot or his CB handle Prime Minista, is an American rapper, songwriter, and record producer. He is best known for his 1992 hit song "Baby Got Back", which peaked at number one on the Billboard Hot 100.

== Early life ==
Anthony Ray was born on August 12, 1963, in Auburn, Washington, and grew up in Seattle's Central District. In Ray's youth, his mother worked as a licensed practical nurse at the King County Jail. Ray was a fan of hip-hop and started rapping in the early 1980s.

While living in the Bryant Manor apartments on 19th Ave and East Yesler Way, Anthony Ray started school at Roosevelt High School, near the University District, when the Seattle Public School District was in the midst of what would be a 21-year experiment to integrate the school system. Students were bused from their neighborhoods to schools at the other end of the city. From 1978 to 1999, when the busing program was in operation, minorities were the chief beneficiaries of busing, going from the South End and the Central Area to predominantly white schools in the North End.

Ray said he knew that some North End residents did not want black children bused into their neighborhoods. But for him, the experience offered respite from the projects. "I've heard things like, 'Forced integration is not good,' 'I want my kid to be able to go to school in our community; that's why we moved here' – all those things I totally understand," he said. "But from my perspective, I didn't have the luxury of living in a neighborhood where a good school was. We didn't make that kind of money. So from my perspective, it was the best thing that could have happened to me." A music teacher at Eckstein Middle School introduced Ray to the possibility of a music career.

Ray was interested in electronics and CB radio from a young age. One of his early jobs was working at a pinball arcade servicing machines, and during that time he started to fix keyboards and other musical equipment. He still works with electronics as a hobby.

== Career ==
=== 1980s ===
Soon after high school, he began DJing parties at local community centers. By 1983, Sir Mix-a-Lot had begun playing weekends regularly at the Rainier Vista Boys and Girls Club in South Seattle. Soon he moved locations and started hosting his parties at the Rotary Boys and Girls Club in the Central District. It was there that he met 'Nasty' Nes Rodriguez, a local radio DJ and host of Fresh Tracks, the West Coast's first rap radio show on Seattle station KKFX (K-Fox).

Sir Mix-a-Lot partnered with Nasty Nes and local businessman Ed Locke to found the Nastymix record label in 1983. The first song to gain popularity outside of Seattle was "Square Dance Rap" in 1986. Mix-a-Lot had originally decided to rap the entire song slowly, then speed it up and increase its pitch in post production, Mix later told Seattle Refined in 2018 that "I didn't want to rap, that's why I use this weird Smurf voice". After the song was picked up by DJs in clubs nationwide, he toured Florida, New York, and other states. While in Arizona, he noticed a street named Broadway with a restaurant named Dick's, just like Seattle. This gave him the idea to write his next hit, "Posse on Broadway". The title referred to Broadway in Seattle's Capitol Hill district. Released in 1987, the single made the Top 100 but quickly disappeared, although it remains popular in the Seattle area for its references to many local landmarks.

Swass, Sir Mix-a-Lot's debut album, was released in 1988 with two other singles: "Square-Dance Rap" and "Iron Man", a rap metal track sampling from the song of the same name by Black Sabbath; it was backed by the band Metal Church. In 1990, the Recording Industry Association of America certified Swass platinum.

Seminar, released in 1989, featured "My Hooptie", "Beepers", "Gortex" and "I Got Game".

=== 1990s ===
In 1991, Sir Mix-a-Lot signed to the Def American label, which also bought the rights to his first two albums, and released his third album Mack Daddy in 1992. The single "Baby Got Back" was a number one hit that went double platinum and won the 1993 Grammy Award for Best Rap Solo Performance. MTV aired the music video for the song only after 9 PM because of "many, many, complaints."

In 1993, Sir Mix-a-Lot collaborated with Seattle-based grunge band Mudhoney for the song "Freak Momma" on the Judgment Night soundtrack.

In 1994, he released the album Chief Boot Knocka, which reached No. 69 on the Billboard 200 and No. 28 on the Top R&B/Hip-Hop Chart. The album featured the hit single "Put 'Em On The Glass". "Just Da Pimpin' in Me" was nominated for the Grammy Award for Best Rap Solo Performance but lost to "Let Me Ride" by Dr. Dre.

When his 1996 album Return of the Bumpasaurus was only given a low label promotion, leading to lackluster sales, Sir Mix-a-Lot left Def American.

In 1999–2000, he worked closely with the band The Presidents of the United States of America under the group name "Subset" with a combination of rock and rap music. They released some songs online and toured, but nothing was ever officially released.

=== 2000s ===
Sir Mix-a-Lot signed with the independent label Artist Direct for his 2003 album Daddy's Home with "Big Johnson" as its lead single. The next year, he released a DVD entitled "Shhhh... Don't Tell 'Em That" to promote the album.

=== 2010s ===
In 2010, Sir Mix-a-Lot announced his next album, Dun 4got About Mix. The lead single "Carz" was released to YouTube on 23 Nov 2010. By June 2011, the video had had over a million views, although no release date for the album has been set as of 2023. In the same year, his F.U.B.a.R. Remix for the song Conditions Of My Parole appeared on Puscifer's remix album All Re-Mixed Up.

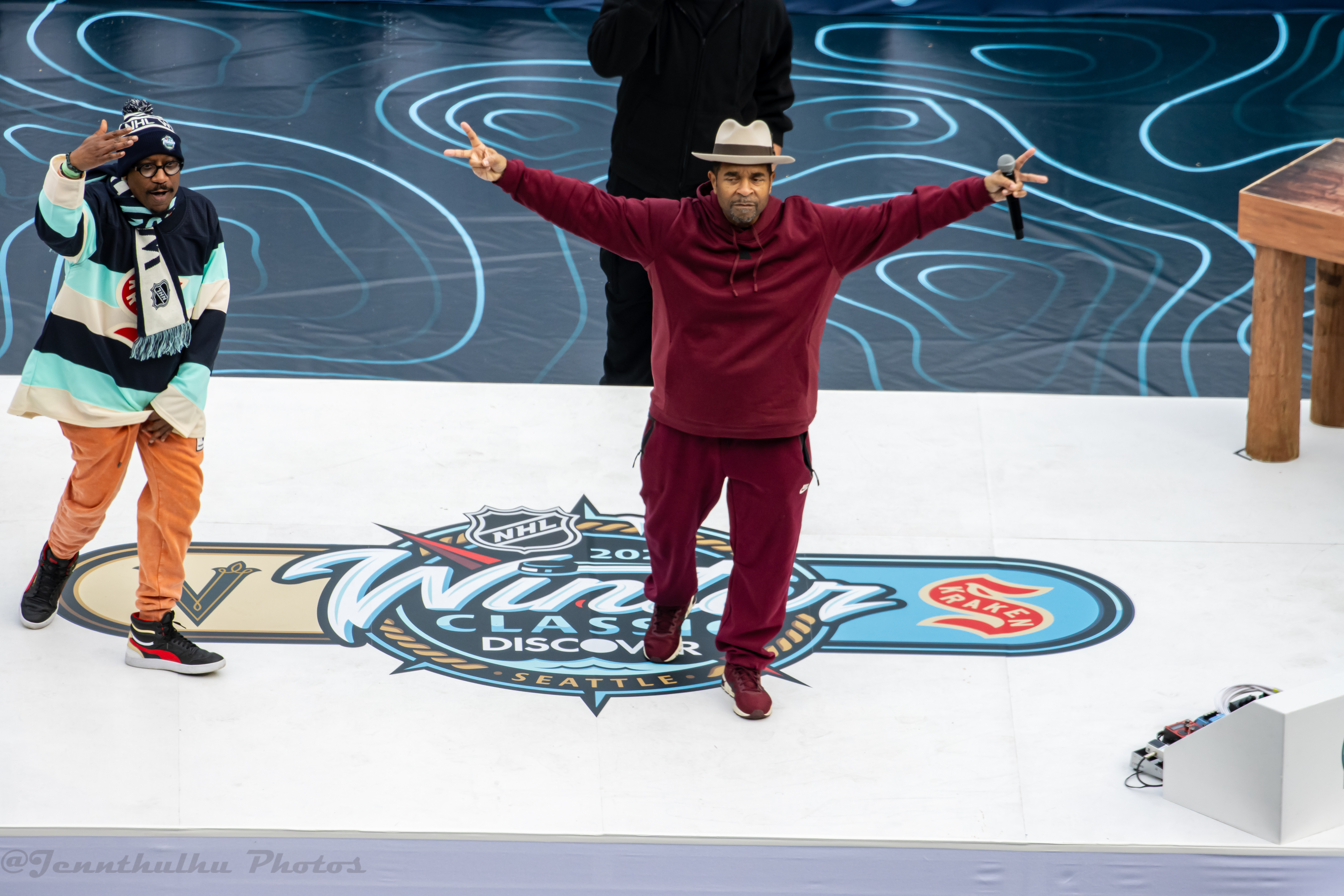
Sir Mix-a-lot performing at the 2024 Winter Classic in Seattle.

In 2013, Sir Mix-a-Lot produced the album Dream for the urban rock band Ayron Jones and The Way. He opened their album release party at Neumos on November 2. That Christmas season, he promoted the Washington State Lottery over the Christmas season, with advertisements featuring his music appearing on Spotify.

On June 6, 2014, Sir Mix-a-Lot collaborated and performed with the Seattle Symphony on a new composition by Gabriel Prokofiev as part of the symphony's Sonic Evolution series of new orchestral pieces inspired by Seattle's music icons.

In 2014, rapper Nicki Minaj released the single "Anaconda", which prominently featured samples from "Baby Got Back". Sir Mix-a-Lot praised both the artist and the song, calling it the "new and improved version" of "Baby Got Back".

In March 2016, Sir Mix-a-Lot collaborated with TNT and LK on the track and video, "Streets Don't Love Me".

From 2017 to 2019, Sir Mix-a-Lot hosted a morning radio show based in Seattle on Hot 103.7 FM.

He owns multiple residences, including one in Auburn, Washington. He has continued to maintain a strong presence performing at small festivals across the country.

== Television work ==
In 1995, Sir Mix-a-Lot was the regular host of the short-lived UPN anthology drama series The Watcher. In 2000, he said that "in retrospect, I wish I hadn't done" the show.

In 2006, Sir Mix-a-Lot appeared on Adult Swim's Tom Goes to the Mayor and "Treehouse of Horror XVII" on Fox's The Simpsons. In 2008, he appeared on Adult Swim's Robot Chicken singing a song entitled "Table Be Round". It was sung in the style of "Baby Got Back", but was about to King Arthur's creation of the Round Table. He also voiced politician Hans Blix and singer Stevie Wonder in the season 3 finale. He appeared in "The Judge" episode of Season 4 of BoJack Horseman playing himself. Then in 2025, He appeared in the episode, "Lois C.K." on Fox's Family Guy while singing a song entitled "Lady Kneecaps". Which was also sung in the style of "Baby Got Back", but was about big thighs.

Sir Mix-a-Lot provides narration and commentary in Wheedle's Groove, a 2009 documentary about the Seattle 1960s and '70s funk and soul scene.

In June 2018, the DIY Network aired a special called Sir Mix-A-Lot's House Remix, which involved Sir Mix-a-Lot buying and flipping a house in Seattle.

In 2019, he became the spokesperson for Cards Against Humanity's "Ass Pack".

== Discography ==
- Swass (1988)
- Seminar (1989)
- Mack Daddy (1992)
- Chief Boot Knocka (1994)
- Return of the Bumpasaurus (1996)
- Daddy's Home (2003)

== Filmography ==
Year	Title	Role	Notes
1995	The Watcher	Himself/Host	Main role
2006	Tom Goes to the Mayor	Himself (voice)	Episode: "My Big Cups"
2006	The Simpsons	Himself (voice)	Episode: "Treehouse of Horror XVII"
2008	Robot Chicken	Himself, Hans Blix, Stevie Wonder (voices)	Episode: "Chirlaxx"
2017	BoJack Horseman	Himself (voice)	Episode: "The Judge"
2018	Sir Mix-a-Lot's House Remix	Himself	Television special
2025	Family Guy	Himself (voice)	Episode: "Lois C.K."

== Awards and nominations ==
=== Grammy Awards ===
Year	Nominated work	Award	Result
1993	"Baby Got Back"	Best Rap Solo Performance	Won
1994	"Just Da Pimpin' In Me"	Best Rap Solo Performance	Nominated
1999	Televoid	Best Long Form Music Video	Nominated

=== MTV Video Music Awards ===
Year	Nominated work	Award	Result
1992	"Baby Got Back"	Best Rap Video	Nominated
1992	"Baby Got Back"	Best Direction in a Video	Nominated
1993	"Baby Got Back"	Best Art Direction in a Video	Nominated

=== American Music Awards ===
Year	Nominated work	Award	Result
1993	Sir Mix-a-Lot	Favorite Rap/Hip-Hop Artist	Won

=== Soul Train Music Awards ===
Year	Nominated work	Award	Result
1993	"Baby Got Back"	Best R&B/Soul Single – Male	Nominated
