= List of musicians from Seattle =

This list of musicians from Seattle includes musicians who are either from, or significantly associated with, the city.

- 10 Minute Warning, hardcore punk band
- 3rd Secret, alternative rock/folk rock/grunge band
- 7 Horns 7 Eyes, Christian melodic death metal band
- 7 Year Bitch, riot grrrl band
- 764-HERO, indie rock/emo band
- A Frames, experimental rock band
- Abney Park, steampunk band
- Abyssinian Creole, Northwest hip hop duo
- Acceptance, pop-punk band
- The Accused, crossover thrash band
- Aiden, horror punk band
- Akimbo, hardcore punk band
- Alcohol Funnycar, alternative rock/post-grunge band
- Alex Vincent, grunge/punk rock drummer
- Alice in Chains, grunge band
- Alice N' Chains, glam metal band
- Allen Stone, blue-eyed soul singer-songwriter
- Alyse Black, rock/pop/jazz/folk pop singer-songwriter
- Amber Pacific, pop-punk band
- Amy Denio, avant-garde jazz/experimental rock/free improvisation multi-instrumenralist/vocalist
- Andrew Wood, grunge/glam metal vocalist
- Ann Wilson, hard rock/pop rock vocalist
- Anomie Belle, avant-garde vocalist/multi-instrumentalist
- Aqueduct, indie pop band
- Artis the Spoonman, rock spoonist/busker
- Arthur & Yu, indie folk duo
- Assemblage 23, futurepop band
- Asva, drone/doom metal band
- Awaken the Empire, alternative rock/metal band
- "Awesome", cabaret collective
- Ayron Jones, blues rock vocalist/guitarist
- Babe Egan, jazz violinist and bandleader
- Baby Gramps, Americana singer-songwriter
- Band of Horses, indie rock band
- Barcelona, indie rock band
- Barrett Martin, grunge percussionist & ethnomusicologist
- The Beakers, art punk/post-punk/new wave band
- Bell Witch, doom metal band
- Ben Bridwell, indie rock vocalist/guitarist
- Ben Gibbard, indie rock vocalist/guitarist
- Ben Shepherd, grunge bassist
- The Bergevin Brothers, political jazz band
- Bernadette Bascom, R&B/gospel vocalist
- Best Kissers in the World, post-grunge band
- Big Band Garage Orchestra, punk jazz orchestra
- Big Business, heavy metal band
- Bill Frisell, jazz guitarist
- Bill Rieflin, industrial rock drummer
- Black Cat Orchestra, classical/world/film score band
- The Blackouts, punk rock band
- Blaine "Zippy" Cook, punk rock/thrash metal vocalist
- Blake Lewis, beatboxer/pop vocalist
- Blake Wescott, indie rock guitarist/drummer
- The Blakes, indie rock band
- The Blood Brothers, post-hardcore band
- Blood Circus, sludge metal band
- Bloodgood, Christian metal band
- Blue Scholars, Northwest hip hop/alternative hip hop duo
- BOAT, indie rock band
- Bonnie Guitar, country/pop singer-songwriter/guitarist
- Stan Boreson, "Scandahoovian" parody music vocalist/accordionist
- Botch, mathcore band
- Patti Bown, jazz/soul pianist/vocalist
- Brad, alternative rock band
- Brandi Carlile, Americana singer-songwriter
- Brent Amaker and the Rodeo, country band
- Briana Marela, indie rock vocalist
- The Briefs, punk rock band
- Brite Futures (formerly Natalie Portman's Shaved Head), indie rock/electronica band
- The Brothers Four, folk pop vocal group
- Bruce Fairweather, grunge guitarist/bassist
- Buddy Catlett, jazz bassist
- Budo, hip hop multi-instrumenralist/producer
- Bundle of Hiss, grunge band
- Burning Witch, doom metal band
- Calm Down Juanita, psychedelic rock band
- Candlebox, grunge/post-grunge band
- Car Seat Headrest, indie rock band
- Cardiknox, indie pop band
- Carissa's Wierd, indie rock band
- Carrie Akre, alternative rock vocalist
- Cat Butt, alternative rock band
- The Catch, alternative pop band
- The Catheters, hard rock band
- The Cave Singers, indie rock/folk band
- Chad Channing, alternative rock drummer
- Champion, hardcore punk band
- charlieonnafriday, melodic rapper
- Chastity Belt, alternative rock band
- Childbirth, garage rock band
- Chinas Comidas, art punk band
- Chinese American Bear, neo-psychedelic C-pop duo
- Choral Arts, choral music group
- Chris Ballew aka Caspar Babypants, alternative rock/kids' music vocalist/bassist/basitarist
- Chris Cornell, grunge/hard rock vocalist
- Chris Staples, alternative rock multi-instrumenralist
- Chris Walla, indie rock singer-songwriter/guitarist
- Christ Analogue, electronic/industrial rock band
- Christian Wargo, indie folk singer-songwriter/guitarist
- Circus Contraption, dark cabaret troupe
- Clarence Acox Jr., jazz drummer & director of the Garfield Jazz Ensemble (1979–2019)
- The Classic Crime, alternative rock band
- Climax Golden Twins, experimental music band
- Clint McCune, indie rock vocalist
- Cody Votolato, post-hardcore guitarist
- Coffin Break, hardcore punk band
- Common Market, Northwest hip hop duo
- Critters Buggin, jazz/rock/funk/electronica instrumental band
- Culprit, heavy metal band
- Cuong Vu, jazz trumpet
- Daily Flash, folk rock/psychedelic rock band
- Damien Jurado, indie rock singer-songwriter
- Dan Hoerner, emo vocalist/guitarist
- Dan Peters, grunge drummer
- Daniel House, grunge bassist & former owner of C/Z Records
- Dann Gallucci, indie rock guitarist/producer
- The Dark Fantastic, hard/desert/psychedelic/indie rock band
- Dark Time Sunshine, alternative/indie hip hop duo
- Dave Dederer, alternative rock vocalist/guitarist/guitbassist
- Dave Knudson, indie rock/mathcore guitarist
- Dave Krusen, alternative rock drummer
- Dave Lewis, R&B vocalist/keyboardist
- David Bazan, indie rock singer-songwriter/multi-instrumentalist
- David Friesen, jazz bassist
- David Zaffiro, Christian metal guitarist & producer
- David Wayne, heavy metal vocalist
- Dead Low Tide, garage rock band
- The Dead Science, experimental pop band
- Dear John Letters, alternative rock/indie rock/emo band
- Death Cab For Cutie, indie rock band
- Deep Sea Diver, pop rock band
- Demon Hunter, Christian metal band
- Devilhead, alternative rock band
- Diagram of Suburban Chaos, electronic music composer
- Dick Wilson, jazz tenor saxophonist
- Dickless, riot grrrl/grunge/punk rock/funk punk band
- The Divorce, indie rock band
- Doll Squad, alternative rock/power pop band
- Dolour, indie rock band
- Don Lanphere, jazz saxophonist
- Dude York, alternative rock band
- Duff McKagan, hard rock bassist
- Dust Moth, metalgaze band
- The Dutchess and the Duke, indie folk band
- Eddie Vedder, grunge vocalist
- Eldon Hoke aka El Duce, shock rock vocalist/drummer
- Elmer Gill, jazz pianist/vibraphonist/vocalist
- Emi Meyer, jazz vocalist/pianist
- Eric Barone, video game music composer/sound designer
- Erik Blood, hip hop artist/producer
- Ernestine Anderson, vocal jazz/blues vocalist
- Estradasphere, experimental rock band
- Fair, alternative rock/emo pop band
- Faith & Disease, ethereal wave/dark wave/slowcore/shoegaze/dream pop/new-age band
- The Fall of Troy, mathcore band
- The Fartz, hardcore punk band
- Fastbacks, punk rock band
- Fences, pop rock band
- Fifth Angel, heavy metal band
- The Fire Theft, prog rock band
- Fleet Foxes, indie folk band
- Flop, power pop band
- Floyd Standifer, jazz tenor saxophonist/trumpeter
- Foo Fighters, post-grunge band
- Forced Entry, thrash metal band
- Forgive Durden, indie rock/emo band
- Frank Waldron, jazz cornetist/trumpeter/alto saxophonist
- The Frantics, garage rock band
- Gabor Hun, punk rock guitarist/vocalist
- Gabriel Teodros, Northwest hip hop rapper
- The Gallahads, doo wop vocal group
- Gary Lee Conner, grunge guitarist
- Gas Huffer, garage rock band
- Gatsbys American Dream, indie rock band
- The Gentlemen, pop rock band
- Geoff Reading, hard rock drummer
- Gerald Brashear, jazz conga drummer/saxophonist/scat singer
- Girl On Fire, hard rock band
- The Girls, pop punk band
- The Gits, punk rock band
- Goodness, alternative rock band
- Gosling (formerly Loudermilk), hard rock band
- Grammatrain, post-punk band
- Grand Archives, indie rock band
- Grand Hallway, chamber pop
- Grave Babies, goth rock band
- Grayskul, Northwest hip hop/alternative hip hop duo
- Green Apple Quick Step, post-grunge/psychedelic rock band
- The Green Pajamas, neo-psychedelia band
- Green River, grunge band
- Greg Anderson, doom metal guitarist
- Greg Gilmore, grunge drummer
- Grieves, hip hop rapper/producer
- Gruntruck, grunge band
- Guy Lacey, grunge guitarist/vocalist
- Hadley Caliman, jazz saxophonist/flutist
- Hammerbox, grunge band
- Harold Weeks, jazz/ragtime composer/songwriter
- Harvey Danger, alternative rock band
- Hater, alternative metal band
- He Is We, indie pop band
- The Head and the Heart, indie folk band
- Headphones, indie rock/synthpop band
- Heart, hard rock/pop rock band
- Heir Apparent, heavy metal band
- Heiress, sludge metal band
- Hell's Belles, all-girl AC/DC tribute band
- Helms Alee, sludge metal band
- Hey Marseilles, indie folk/chamber pop band
- Hibou, dream pop band
- Himsa, metalcore band
- Hiro Yamamoto, grunge bassist
- Hobosexual, experimental rock band
- Hollis, pop/hip hop singer-songwriter
- The Home Team, Pop Punk band
- Howard Leese, hard rock guitarist
- Hovercraft, experimental rock instrumental band
- I Declare War, deathcore band
- The Intelligence, post-punk band
- Isaac Brock, indie rock vocalist/guitarist
- Isaac Scott, blues/soul/gospel guitarist/vocalist
- Ivan & Alyosha, indie pop band
- Ivar Haglund, folk singer and founder of Ivar's Acres of Clams
- J. Clark, post-punk guitarist/drummer
- Jack Endino, grunge guitarist & Sub Pop producer/engineer
- Jake Snider, indie rock guitarist/vocalist
- Jake One, Northwest hip hop/trap producer/songwriter
- James Bergstrom, hard rock drummer
- Jason Finn, alternative rock drummer
- Jason Holstrom, electronic rock/dream pop guitarist/vocalist
- Jason Webley, folk punk vocalist/accordionist/guitarist
- Jay Park, hip hop/R&B rapper/singer-songwriter
- Jeff Ament, grunge bassist
- Jeff Angell, blues rock vocalist/guitarist
- Jeff Kashiwa, jazz fusion saxophonist
- Jeff Loomis, prog rock guitarist
- Jeff Rouse, hard rock bassist
- Jeff Suffering, Christian punk vocalist/bassist
- Jen Wood, alternative rock vocalist/guitarist
- Jennifer Thomas, crossover/classical/new-age pianist
- Jeremiah Green, indie rock drummer
- Jeremy Enigk, emo/prog rock vocalist/guitarist
- Jerry Cantrell, grunge guitarist/vocalist
- Jesse Brand, country rock singer-songwriter/multi-instrumentalist
- Jessica Lurie, jazz woodwinds
- Jim Allchin, blues rock guitarist/vocalist & Microsoft software engineer
- Jim Black, free jazz/post-rock drummer
- Jim Page, folk singer-songwriter/busker
- Jim Sheppard, prog rock bassist
- Jimi Hendrix, psychedelic rock/blues rock guitarist/vocalist
- Joe Doria, jazz/funk/rock Hammond organist
- John Holte, big band swing bandleader/arranger/reedist
- John Pettibone, hardcore punk/metalcore vocalist
- John Roderick, indie rock singer-songwriter/guitarist
- Johnny Bacolas, glam metal/industrial dance/world music bassist
- Johnny Whitney, post-hardcore vocalist/keyboardist
- Jon Auer, power pop/psychedelic rock guitarist
- Jonathan Moore aka Wordsayer, Northwest hip hop producer/rapper/DJ
- Jordan Blilie, post-hardcore vocalist
- Julian Priester, jazz trombonist & educator (Cornish College of the Arts 1979–2011)
- Juned, pop rock band
- Juno, post-punk band
- Kay Kay and His Weathered Underground, psychedelic pop band
- Kenny G, smooth jazz saxophonist
- Ken Stringfellow, alternative rock guitarist/vocalist
- Ken Mary, heavy metal drummer
- Kevin Wood, grunge guitarist
- Kevtone, alternative rock drummer
- Kid Sensation (now known as Xola Malik), old skool hip hop rapper/producer
- Kill Switch...Klick, industrial rock band
- Kim Thayil, grunge guitarist
- Kim Warnick, punk rock vocalist/bassist
- Kings Kaleidoscope, contemporary worship/Christian rock/art rock/chamber pop/progressive pop band
- Kinski, post-rock band
- Kiss It Goodbye, metalcore/hardcore punk band
- Krist Novoselic, grunge bassist
- Kultur Shock, Gypsy punk/alternative metal band
- Kurt Bloch, hard rock guitarist
- Kurt Cobain, grunge vocalist/guitarist
- Kyle Townsend, hip hop/R&B producer/keyboardist
- La Luz, surf noir band
- Land, jazz/world music/electronica band
- The Lashes, power pop band
- Lavender Country, country/Americana band
- Layne Staley, grunge vocalist
- Leah LaBelle, R&B vocalist
- Legion Within, dark wave/gothic rock/industrial rock band
- The Lemons, post-grunge/pop punk band
- Liar's Club, pop music band
- Lil Mosey, hip hop/trap rapper
- Limp Richerds, hardcore punk band
- Little Champions, indie rock band
- Living Daylights, jazz-jamband trio
- Loaded, hard rock band
- The Long Winters, indie rock band
- Loni Rose, pop music singer-songwriter
- Love Battery, grunge band
- The Lovemongers, acoustic side project of Ann & Nancy Wilson of Heart
- Macklemore, hip hop rapper
- Mad Rad, hipster hop group
- Mad Season, grunge band
- The Magic Magicians, indie rock duo
- Maktub, jazz fusion/prog rock band
- The Maldives, alt-country band
- Malfunkshun, glam punk/grunge band
- Mamiffer, post-rock/ambient/experimental rock/drone
- Manooghi Hi, prog rock band
- Marc Seales, jazz/post-bop pianist
- Mark Arm, grunge vocalist/guitarist
- Mark Lanegan, grunge vocalist
- Mark Pickerel, grunge drummer/guitarist/vocalist
- Mary Lambert, R&B/folk/pop singer-songwriter & spoken word artist
- Mat Brooke, indie rock singer-songwriter/guitarist
- Mateo Messina, classical/film score pianist/composer
- Math and Physics Club, indie pop band
- Matt Bayles, indie rock keyboardist & producer
- Matt Lukin, grunge bassist
- Melissa Reese, hard rock keyboardist/vocalist
- Merrilee Rush, pop vocalist
- Mentors, shock rock band
- Metal Church, heavy metal band
- Mia Zapata, punk rock vocalist
- Michael Powers, jazz guitarist
- Michael "The Whip" Wilton, progressive metal guitarist
- Mico de Noche, stoner rock/sludge metal band
- Mike Inez, grunge/alternative metal bassist
- Mike McCready, grunge guitarist
- Mike Squires, alternative rock guitarist
- Mike Starr, grunge bassist
- Minus the Bear, math rock band
- The Missionary Position, blues rock band
- Mistrust, heavy metal band
- Modest Mouse, indie rock band
- Mother Love Bone, grunge/glam punk band
- Mr. Hill, Northwest hip hop/alternative hip hop DJ & producer
- Mt. St. Helens Vietnam Band, indie rock band
- Mudhoney, grunge band
- Murder City Devils, horror punk band
- My Sister's Machine, grunge band
- The Myriad, indie rock band
- Nacho Picasso, hip hop rapper
- Naked Giants, rock and roll/psychedelic rock/grunge/post-punk/lo-fi band
- Nancy Wilson, hard rock/pop rock guitarist/backing vocalist
- Narrows, mathcore band
- Natalie Grant, contemporary Christian vocalist
- Nate Mendel, alternative rock bassist
- Neko Case, indie rock/alt-country vocalist/tenor guitarist/percussionist
- Neon Blonde, experimental rock band
- Nerve Filter, electronic band
- Nevada Bachelors, alternative rock band
- Nevermore, heavy metal band
- New American Shame, hard rock band
- Nick Pollock, grunge guitarist/vocalist
- Nick Wiggins, post-hardcore guitarist/bassist
- Night Beats, garage rock band
- Nightcaps, lounge band
- Nirvana, grunge band
- Nissim Black aka D.Black, hardcore/conscious/Jewish hip hop rapper/producer
- The No WTO Combo, hardcore punk/spoken word band
- Noah Gundersen and the Courage, acoustic folk rock singer-songwriter and his band
- NoClue, Northwest hip hop rapper
- Odesza, electropop duo
- Oldominion, hip hop collective (which also has members from Portland, Oregon)
- On the Last Day, post-hardcore band
- Onry Ozzborn, alternative hip hop rapper/producer
- Orcas, dream pop/ambient/electronic duo
- Orkestar RTW, Balkan folk band
- Owen Wright, grunge/heavy metal guitarist
- Pacific Gold, contemporary Christian band
- The Pale Pacific, power pop band
- Pamela Moore, hard rock/heavy metal singer-songwriter
- Aaron Parks, jazz pianist
- Past Lives, post-punk band
- Paul Tutmarc, country tenor vocalist/lap steel guitarist
- Pearl Jam, grunge band
- Pedro The Lion, slowcore band
- Perfume Genius, art pop singer-songwriter
- Perkins Coie Band, rock and roll/garage rock band
- Pete Stewart, Christian rock singer-songwriter
- Peter Cornell, alternative metal/heavy metal/grunge/alternative rock/hard rock singer-songwriter/guitarist
- Peter DePoe (aka Last Walking Bear), funk rock/swamp rock/soul/R&B/Native American traditional drummer
- Peter Scott Lewis, contemporary classical composer
- Pickwick, garage rock band
- Pigeonhed, trip hop/lo-fi band
- PK Dwyer, jump blues busker
- Pleaseeasaur, camp musical parody act
- Pollens, indie rock band
- Ponga, jazz improv band
- Pony Time, garage rock/punk rock band
- Poor Moon, indie folk band
- Poor Old Lu, Christian rock band
- The Posies, power pop band
- The Postal Service, indie pop/synth-pop band
- Posse, indie rock band
- Presidents of the United States of America, alternative rock band
- Pretty Girls Make Graves, post-punk band
- The Prom, indie rock band
- Psychic Emperor, electropop band
- Q5, hard rock/heavy metal band
- Queensrÿche, hard rock/heavy metal band
- Quincy Jones, jazz trumpeter/arranger & multi-genre producer
- RA Scion, Northwest hip hop/alternative hip hop rapper/producer
- Raft of Dead Monkeys, Christian punk band
- Rail, hard rock band
- Randy Hansen, psychedelic rock/blues rock guitarist & Jimi Hendrix tribute performer
- Ray Charles, R&B vocalist/pianist
- Ray Dalton, hip hop/gospel/R&B/pop singer-songwriter
- Raz Simone, hip hop rapper
- Red Stars Theory, slowcore band
- Regan Hagar, grunge drummer
- Reggie Watts, comedic electronic/trip hop beatboxer/keyboardist & "disinformationist"
- Reignwolf, indie rock/blues rock band
- Reverend, thrash metal band
- The Revolutionary Hydra, indie rock band
- Richard Stuverud, grunge drummer
- Rick Parashar, grunge keyboardist & founder of London Bridge Studio
- Roadside Monument, math rock band
- Robert "Bumps" Blackwell, jazz bandleader & multi-genre producer
- Robert Cray, blues vocalist/guitarist
- Robert DeLong, house/dubstep keyboardist/sampler
- Robert Brown aka Captain Robert, steampunk vocalist/multi-instrumentalist
- Robert Roth, grunge/psychedelic rock vocalist/keyboardist/guitarist
- Robin Pecknold, indie folk singer-songwriter
- Robin Holcomb, avant-garde minimalist singer-songwriter/pianist
- The Rockfords, alternative rock band
- Rocky Votolato, indie folk/folk rock singer-songwriter
- Roger Fisher, hard rock guitarist
- Ron Holden, R&B/pop/rock and roll vocalist
- Room Nine, psychedelic rock band
- Rose Blossom Punch, post-grunge band
- Rose Windows, psychedelic rock band
- Rosie Thomas, indie folk singer-songwriter & comedian (as Sheila Saputa)
- Roxy Coss, jazz saxophonist
- The Rumba Kings, world music band
- Rusty Willoughby, power pop vocalist/guitarist/drummer
- Ryan Lewis, alternative hip hop/hipster hop DJ/producer
- Ryann Donnelly, horror punk/pop vocalist
- S aka Jenn Champion (formerly Jenn Ghetto), indie rock singer-songwriter
- Sabzi, alternative hip hop DJ/producer
- Sam Kim, R&B singer-songwriter/guitarist
- Sammy Drain, blues/rock/R&B guitarist
- Sanctuary, thrash metal band
- Sandrider, grunge/sludge metal band
- Sango, electronic/hip hop/R&B DJ/producer
- Sanjaya Malakar, pop vocalist
- Satchel, grunge band
- Satisfact, post-punk band
- The Saturday Knights, hip hop/indie rock/pop band
- Say Hi, indie rock solo act
- The Scene Aesthetic, acoustic indie/folk/country pop band
- Schoolyard Heroes, horror punk band
- scntfc, EDM/hip hop/rock composer/sound designer
- Scott McCaughey, alternative rock guitarist
- Scott Mercado, grunge/psychedelic rock drummer
- Scott Rockenfield aka SRock, prog rock drummer
- Screaming Trees, grunge band
- Seapony, indie pop band
- Sean Kinney, grunge drummer
- Sean Nelson, alternative rock vocalist/keyboardist
- Sean Osborn, classical/chamber clarinetist/composer
- Seattle Chamber Players, chamber ensemble
- Seattle Girls Choir, choral music group
- Seattle Opera, Opera company
- Seattle Pro Musica, choral music group
- Seattle Symphony, classical orchestra
- Second Coming, industrial dance band
- Sera Cahoone, Americana/lo-fi singer-songwriter/guitarist/drummer
- Shabazz Palaces, progressive rap/alternative hip hop group
- Shane Tutmarc, indie pop singer-songwriter/multi-instrumentalist
- Sharks Keep Moving, math rock band
- Shawn Smith, alternative rock vocalist/keyboardist
- Shelby Earl, indie rock singer-songwriter
- Shoplifting, punk rock band
- Sicko, punk rock band
- The Sight Below, ambient/techno/shoegaze/electronic band
- Sir Mix-a-Lot, old skool hip hop/electro-funk rapper/producer
- Sirens Sister, alternative rock band
- Skerik, jazz saxophonics
- Skin Yard, grunge band
- Sky Cries Mary, psychedelic rock/trance band
- SixTwoSeven, alternative rock band
- Sledgeback, punk rock/Oi! band
- Slender Means, indie rock band
- Sleze, glam metal band
- Smoosh (now known as Chaos Chaos), indie pop/synth-pop sister duo
- SMP, industrial rock band
- Soiled Doves (formerly The Vogues), post-hardcore band
- Sol, hip hop rapper
- Solger, hardcore punk band
- Soulbender, hard rock band
- Soundgarden, grunge band
- Source of Labor, Northwest hip hop rap group
- Spencer Moody, garage rock vocalist
- Spluii Numa, hardcore punk band
- Aaron Sprinkle, alternative rock multi-instrumenralist & producer
- Spys4Darwin, alternative metal band
- The Squirrels, novelty pop-punk band
- Stefanie Sargent, punk rock guitarist
- Stephen O'Malley aka SOMA, avant-garde metal guitarist/keyboardist
- Steve Broy aka Dr. Heathen Scum, shock rock bassist
- Steve Turner, grunge guitarist
- Stone Gossard, grunge guitarist
- Sunn O))), experimental metal band
- Sunny Day Real Estate, emo band
- Super Deluxe, punk pop band
- The Supersuckers, cowpunk/hard rock band
- Surf Mesa, electronic music artist
- Sweet 75, alternative rock band
- Sweet Water, alternative rock/new wave band
- SYML, indie pop singer-songwriter
- Syncopated Taint Septet, punk jazz band
- Tacocat, pop punk band
- Tad, grunge band
- Taime Downe, glam metal vocalist
- Tamara Gee, pop singer-songwriter
- Tangerine, dream pop band
- Tattle Tale, riot grrrl band
- Tea Cozies, garage rock band
- Teen Angels, grunge band
- Telekinesis, indie rock/shoegaze band
- The Tempers, synthpop/glam rock/art rock/dark cabaret band
- Temple of the Dog, grunge supergroup
- THEESatisfaction, hip hop/R&B/neo-soul duo
- These Arms Are Snakes, post-hardcore band
- This Busy Monster, indie rock band
- This Providence, alternative rock/punk pop/emo band
- Thorr's Hammer, death-doom band
- Thrones, avant-garde metal solo project of Joe Preston
- Throw Me The Statue, indie pop band
- Thunderpussy, hard rock band
- Tim Gemmill, jazz/post-bop/avant-garde jazz/jazz fusion/techno saxophonist/flutist/keyboardist
- Tim Mullen, punk rock/heavy metal drummer
- Tina Bell, grunge/punk rock singer-songwriter
- Tiny Vipers, indie rock singer-songwriter/guitarist
- The Tiptons Sax Quartet, jazz quartet
- TKO, glam rock/heavy metal band
- Tom Collier, jazz/classical/pop vibraphonist/percussionist
- Total Experience Gospel Choir, gospel choir
- Trachtenburg Family Slideshow Players, anti-folk/indie rock/art pop band
- Travis Bracht, post-grunge singer-songwriter/multi-instrumentalist
- Treepeople, alternative rock/post-punk band
- Trial, hardcore punk band
- The Tripwires, power pop/pub rock band
- Truly, grunge/psychedelic rock band
- Tuatara, world music instrumental band
- Tullycraft, twee pop band
- The Turn-Ons, alternative rock band
- Tyler Willman, post-grunge/psychedelic rock singer-songwriter/guitarist
- The U-Men, grunge band
- Ugly Casanova, indie rock band
- UMI, R&B singer-songwriter
- Uncle Bonsai, contemporary folk trio
- Undertow, hardcore punk band
- Unified Theory (formerly Luma), post-grunge band
- United State of Electronica, electronic rock band
- Unwed Sailor, instrumental rock/ambient/post-rock band
- Van Conner, grunge bassist
- VAST, industrial rock band
- Vells, indie rock band
- Vendetta Red, post-grunge/screamo band
- Vic Meyers, jazz saxophonist/ bandleader
- Vince Mira, country rock vocalist/guitarist
- Visqueen, punk pop band
- The Walkabouts, indie rock/alt-country band
- Walking Papers, alternative rock band
- Walt Wagner, lounge/pop/classical/rock and roll pianist (Canlis 1996–2016)
- War Babies, hard rock band
- Warrel Dane, heavy metal/thrash metal vocalist
- Waxwing, indie rock band
- Wayne Horvitz, jazz/downtown scene keyboardist & adjunct professor at the Cornish College of the Arts
- Wellwater Conspiracy, garage rock/neo-psychedelia/space rock band
- Western State Hurricanes, indie rock band
- Whangdoodle Entertainers, jazz/ragtime band
- White (formerly MerKaBa), prog rock band
- Wil Francis aka William Control, horror punk/dark wave singer-songwriter
- Willard, grunge/sludge metal band
- William Bolcom, contemporary classical/traditional pop/parlour/cabaret/ragtime pianist/composer
- William Control, dark wave band
- William Goldsmith, alternative rock drummer
- Wimps, punk rock band
- Wizdom, Northwest hip hop MC
- Wonderful, dream pop band
- X-15, punk rock band
- Xperience, alternative hip hop rapper
- Young Fresh Fellows, alternative rock band
- Zeke, hardcore punk band
- Zipgun, punk rock band

== See also ==
- List of people from Seattle
- Lists of musicians
- Music of Seattle
