= Kay Kay and His Weathered Underground (album) =

Studio album by Kay Kay and His Weathered Underground
- Released: January 2008 (digital); March 2008 (vinyl); May 26, 2009 (compact disc)
- Recorded: 2006–2007; The House of Breaking Glass (Seattle, WA)
- Genre: Indie rock, baroque pop, jazz
- Length: 52:40
- Label: Bombs Over Bellevue, Suburban Home
- Producer: Phillip A. Peterson, Kirk Huffman, Kyle O'Quin

Kay Kay and His Weathered Underground chronology
Live at the Pretty Parlor (2007)	Kay Kay and His Weathered Underground (2008)	Introducing Kay Kay and His Weathered Underground (2011)

Professional ratings
Review scores
Source	Rating
AbsolutePunk.net	(72%)

Kay Kay and His Weathered Underground is the debut, self-titled album from Seattle musical collective Kay Kay and His Weathered Underground.

After a copy of the band's cassette found its way to John Sidel of V2 Records, the band signed an initial agreement to record a full-length album, but V2 was bought out by Universal Music shortly thereafter and a finalized contract never materialized.

The band eventually struck a deal with Vinyl Collective, a subsidiary of Suburban Home Records, to put out a double-LP vinyl version of the album. It was made available on the Vinyl Collective website in March 2008 after the band quietly released it on Amazon.com's MP3 download store. The album has since been made available for download on iTunes.

The album was released on compact disc on May 26, 2009 via Suburban Home.

== Track listing ==
All songs and lyrics written by Kirk Huffman and Kyle O'Quin. Orchestral arrangements by Phillip A. Peterson.

1. Into The Realm Of The Unknown (0:59)
2. Hey Momma' (4:11)
3. Birds (On A Day Like Today) (3:54)
4. Simon Courage Flees The Coop (3:26)
5. Ol' Rum Davies (2:27)
6. Bowie The Desert Pea (5:03)
7. Santa Cruz Lined Pockets (3:43)
8. Bloodstone Goddess (5:38)
9. Cloud Country (3:44)
10. Swan Ink (5:04)
11. Night Of The Star Child's Funk (5:03)
12. One Ought To See (2:50)
13. All Alone (6:38)
14. Sword and Sorcery (Vinyl-only bonus track)

== Vinyl information ==
The album's first pressing had three different variations on vinyl, totaling 1,000 copies in the first run:

- Transparent rainbow - 200 copies (no longer available)
- Milky rainbow - 300 copies
- Orange with red speckles - 500 copies

The second pressing was pressed on standard blue.

== Album personnel ==
=== Kay Kay ===
- Kirk Huffman - lead vocals, guitar
- Kyle O'Quin - keys, backing vocals
- Phillip A. Peterson - cello, backing vocals, falsetto vocals

=== His Weathered Underground ===
- Victoria Parker - violin, backing vocals
- Robert Parker - trumpet
- Chet Peterson
- Flora Peterson
- Robin Marsh
- Jonathan Peterson
- JJ Jang - violin
- Joey Seward - tuba
- Erik Howk
- Nate Mooter - bass, backing vocals
- Jacob Hoffman
- Cameron Parkins
- Thomas Hunter - guitar
- Garrett Lunceford - drums
- Racheal Huffman - backing vocals, percussion
- Carey Rayburn - trumpet
- Jacob Kauffman
- Valdy

=== Credits ===
- Produced by Phillip A. Peterson, Kirk Huffman, and Kyle O'Quin.
- Engineered by Phillip A. Peterson, assisted by Matt Clifford.
- Addition recording by Tom Pfaeffle at The Tank Studio
- Mixed and mastered by Tom Pfaeffle.
