= Easy listening =

Popular music genre

- Other names: Beautiful music; middle of the road; traditional pop
- Stylistic origins: Light music; big band
- Cultural origins: 1940s, United States
- Derivative forms: Chill-out music; sunshine pop; adult contemporary music; space music; ambient music; lounge music; lofi hip-hop

Subgenres
- Space age pop; exotica

Easy listening (including mood music) is a popular music genre and radio format that was most popular during the 1950s to the 1970s. It is related to middle of the road (MOR) music and encompasses instrumental recordings of standards, hit songs, non-rock vocals and instrumental covers of selected popular rock songs. It mostly concentrates on music that pre-dates the rock and roll era, characteristically on music from the 1940s and 1950s. It was differentiated from the mostly instrumental beautiful music format by its variety of styles, including a percentage of vocals, arrangements and tempos to fit various parts of the broadcast day.

Easy listening music is often confused with lounge music, but while it was popular in some of the same venues it was meant to be listened to for enjoyment rather than as background sound.

== History ==
External audio
- You may hear examples of easy listening music performed by John Serry on his album Squeeze Play in 1956; Here on listenbrainz.org

The style has been synonymous with the tag "with strings". String instruments had been used in sweet bands in the 1930s and were the dominant soundtrack for movies of Hollywood's Golden Age. In the 1940s and 1950s strings had been used in jazz and popular music contexts. As examples in the jazz genre, there are recordings of Frank Sinatra. Another example of a practitioner in the popular context was Dinah Washington's "What a Difference a Day Makes". In the 1950s the use of strings quickly became a main feature of the developing easy listening genre.

Jackie Gleason, whose first ten albums went gold, expressed the goal was to produce "musical wallpaper that should never be intrusive, but conducive".

Similarly, in 1956, John Serry Sr. sought to utilize the accordion within the context of a jazz sextet to create a soothing mood ideally suited for "low pressure" listening on his album Squeeze Play.

== Reception ==
The magazines Billboard and Record World featured easy listening singles in independently audited record charts. Generally 40 positions in length, they charted airplay on stations such as WNEW-FM, New York City, WWEZ, Cincinnati, and KMPC, Los Angeles. Record World began its listings on January 29, 1967, and ended its charts in the early 1970s. Billboard's Easy Listening chart morphed into the Adult Contemporary chart in 1979, and continues to this day.

During the format's heyday in the 1960s, it was not at all uncommon for easy listening instrumental singles to reach the top of the charts on the Billboard Hot 100 (and stay there for several weeks).

Beautiful music, which grew up alongside easy listening music, had rigid standards for instrumentation, e.g., few or no saxophones – at the time, the saxophone was associated with less refined styles such as jazz and rock and roll, although Billy Vaughn was an exception to the rule – and restrictions on how many vocal pieces could be played in an hour. The easy listening radio format has been generally, but not completely, superseded by the soft adult contemporary format.

According to the Continuum Encyclopedia of Popular Music of the World, "The public prominence and profitability of easy listening [in the postwar years] led to its close association with the so-called 'Establishment' that would eventually be demonized by the rock counterculture." In Christgau's Record Guide: Rock Albums of the Seventies (1981), rock critic Robert Christgau said "semiclassical music is a systematic dilution of highbrow preferences".

== Easy listening singers ==
Easy listening/lounge singers have a lengthy history stretching back to the decades of the early twentieth century. Easy listening music featured popular vocalists such as Frank Sinatra, Bing Crosby, Dean Martin, Patti Page, Tony Bennett, Nat King Cole, Rosemary Clooney, Doris Day, Perry Como, Engelbert Humperdinck, The Carpenters, The Mills Brothers, The Ink Spots, Julie London, and many others. The somewhat derisive term lounge lizard was coined then, and less well-known lounge singers have often been ridiculed as dinosaurs of past eras and parodied for their smarmy delivery of standards.

In the early 1990s the lounge revival was in full swing and included such groups as Combustible Edison, Love Jones, The Cocktails, Pink Martini and Nightcaps. Alternative band Stereolab demonstrated the influence of lounge with releases such as Space Age Bachelor Pad Music and the Ultra-Lounge series of lounge music albums. The lounge style was a direct contradiction to the grunge music that dominated the period.

Moreover, Mike Flowers rose to recognition with his band Mike Flowers Pops in the mid-1990s, with a musical style that is marked by cover versions of classic songs as well as then-contemporary tracks, all clad in an easy listening or lounge sound which both celebrates and parodies the genre.

== See also ==
- Adult standards
- Background music
- Chillout music
- Elevator music
- Exotica
- Light music
- Middle of the road (radio format)
- Muzak
- New age music
- Schlager
- Sentimental ballad
- Soft jazz
- Smooth jazz
- Soft rock
- Yacht rock
