= Sugar Smacks (disambiguation) =

Sugar Smacks was the original name of the breakfast cereal now known as Honey Smacks.

Sugar Smacks or its variants may also refer to:

- Sugarsmacks, the garage rock band of Dan Cunneen
- Sugarsmack, the post-Fetchin' Bones band of Hope Nicholls
