= Obituary (disambiguation) =

An obituary is an article about a recently deceased person.

Obituary may also refer to:

- Obituary (band), an American death metal band
  - Obituary (album), 2017
- Obituary (comics), a Marvel Comics character
- "Obituary" (short story), a 1959 short story by Isaac Asimov
- Obituary (TV series), an Irish television series
- The Obituaries, an American punk rock band

== See also ==
- Obit (disambiguation)
