= Women's Rights (album) =

- Album cover art for "Women's Rights" by Childbirth.

Studio album by Childbirth
- Released: October 2, 2015
- Studio: Vault Studio
- Genre: Punk rock, Riot grrrl, indie rock
- Length: 27:45
- Label: Suicide Squeeze Records

Childbirth chronology
It's a Girl! (2014)	Women's Rights (2015)

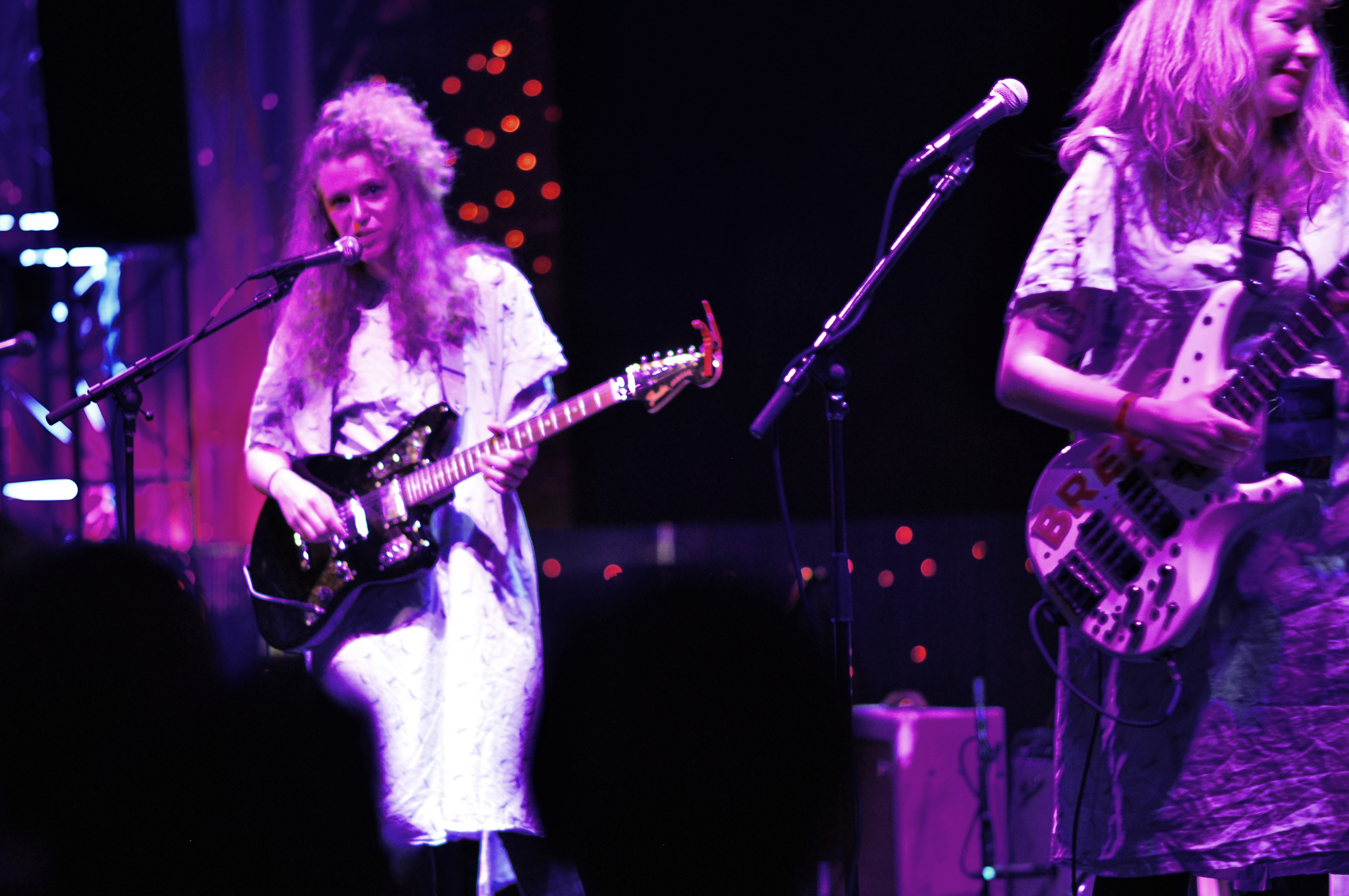
Childbirth performing in 2015.

Women's Rights is the second studio album by Seattle rock band Childbirth. It was recorded at Vault Studio and featured each of the band's members, Bree McKenna (also of the band Tacocat), Stacy Peck (also of the band Pony Time), and Julia Shaprio (also of the band Chastity Belt). The album was released on October 2, 2015 by Suicide Squeeze Records.

== Critical reception ==
Professional ratings
Review scores
Source	Rating
Pitchfork	6.8/10
AllMusic	3.5/5 stars

Women's Rights is noted by critics for its "feminist" tones. Several songs are noted as "silly," "funny," and "comedy[ic]." Bitch Media writer Bobby Moore claimed that songs from the album such as Tech Bro and Siri, Open Tinder "take aim at less-than-desirable men," and NPR reviewer Katie Presley cites the album's hits as addressing a "typically unsung set of freedoms vital to an equitable female experience."

== Track listing ==
All tracks are written by Childbirth.

No.	Title	Length
1.	"Women's Rights"	0:39
2.	"Nasty Grrls"	3:02
3.	"Tech Bro"	2:06
4.	"More Fertile Than You"	2:11
5.	"Breast Coast (Hangin' Out)"	1:31
6.	"Siri, Open Tinder"	2:17
7.	"Cool Mom"	2:18
8.	"Let's Be Bad"	3:31
9.	"Since When Are You Gay?"	2:51
10.	"@Julia Shapiro"	1:52
11.	"Will You Let The Dogs In?"	1:19
12.	"Baby Bump"	2:44
13.	"You're Not My Real Dad"	1:24
Total length:		27:45

== Personnel ==
Sources:

- Bass, vocals – Bree McKenna
- Drums – Stacy Peck
- Artwork, guitar, vocals – Julia Shapiro
- Engineer – Ian Lesage
- Mixing – Alice Wilder
- Mixing – Chris Hanzsek
