= Obit (disambiguation) =

An obit is an article about a recently deceased person.

Obit may also refer to:

- Obit (book), a 2020 book by Victoria Chang
- Obit (film), a 2016 American film
- Obiit, an annual endowed service commemorating the dead
- "O.B.I.T.", an episode of the original The Outer Limits television series

== See also ==
- Obituary (disambiguation)
