= Session 9 =

2001 film by Brad Anderson

- Theatrical release poster
- Directed by: Brad Anderson
- Written by: Brad Anderson; Stephen Gevedon
- Produced by: Dorothy Aufiero; David Collins; Michael Williams
- Starring: David Caruso; Stephen Gevedon; Paul Guilfoyle; Josh Lucas; Peter Mullan; Brendan Sexton III
- Cinematography: Uta Briesewitz
- Edited by: Brad Anderson
- Music by: Climax Golden Twins; Vladimir Ussachevsky
- Production companies: Scout Productions; October Films (Note: As credited in copyright of closing credits.)
- Distributed by: USA Films
- Release dates: July 31, 2001 (Fantasia Festival); August 8, 2001 (Loews Boston Common Theatre); August 10, 2001 (United States)
- Running time: 100 minutes
- Country: United States
- Language: English
- Budget: $1.5 million
- Box office: $1.6 million

Session 9 is a 2001 American psychological horror film directed by Brad Anderson, written by Anderson and Stephen Gevedon, and starring David Caruso, Peter Mullan, Brendan Sexton III, Josh Lucas, and Gevedon. The film follows an asbestos abatement crew who take a clean-up job at the abandoned Danvers State Psychiatric Hospital amid an intense work schedule, growing tensions, and mysterious events occurring around them. Its title refers to a series of audio-taped psychiatric sessions with a former asylum patient, Mary Hobbes, that run parallel to the crew's experiences.

The film marked a tonal departure for Anderson, who previously directed only romantic comedies. Anderson and Gevedon began developing the screenplay in the late 1990s, utilizing the Danvers State Hospital as a central location for the story. The film was partly inspired by the case of Richard Rosenthal, a man who murdered and mutilated his wife at their Boston home in 1995.

Principal photography of Session 9 took place on location at the actual disused Danvers State Hospital in Danvers, Massachusetts in the fall of 2000. It was one of the first motion pictures to be shot in 24p HD digital video, shot by cinematographer Uta Briesewitz. The film's original score was composed by the experimental music group Climax Golden Twins, with a contribution from Vladimir Ussachevsky.

Session 9 premiered at the Fantasia International Film Festival on July 31, 2001, before receiving a limited theatrical release in the United States on August 10, 2001. While not a financial success in the United States, the film received largely favorable reviews, and has gone on to develop a reputation as a cult film.

== Plot ==
Gordon Fleming, the owner of an asbestos abatement company in Massachusetts, makes a bid to remove asbestos from Danvers State Hospital. Desperate for money, he promises to complete the job in only one week, even though a work of this scale would normally require two to three weeks. His crew includes Mike, a law school dropout knowledgeable about the asylum's history; Phil, who is dealing with his grief over a recent breakup; Hank, a gambling addict; and Gordon's nephew Jeff, who has a pathological fear of the dark.

While surveying the job site, Gordon hears a disembodied voice that greets him by name. The men begin their job. Mike discovers a box containing nine audio-taped therapy sessions with Mary Hobbes, a former patient with dissociative identity disorder. Mike listens to the tapes in the ensuing days. In the sessions, Mary's psychologist attempts to unveil details surrounding a crime she committed at her home. Mary exhibits numerous personalities with unique voices and demeanors.

Meanwhile, Hank discovers a cache of antique silver dollar coins and other valuables from the crematory in the hospital's labyrinthine basement. Late that night, he returns to the hospital to retrieve the items and discovers a lobotomy pick among them. He becomes frightened by noises and a shadowy figure, and is confronted by an unknown assailant.

When Hank fails to show up to work the next day, Craig McManus is hired to take his place. Gordon confides in Phil that he slapped his wife Wendy after she inadvertently splashed him with boiling water. Afterward, she refused to answer his calls or let him see their infant daughter. In a stairwell in the hospital, Jeff witnesses Hank staring out a window wearing sunglasses, talking to himself.

Hank goes missing and the men split up to search for him, but Mike is compelled to continue listening to the tapes. Jeff and Phil descend into the tunnels beneath the hospital, where Phil finds Hank, half-nude, muttering to himself. The generator runs out of fuel, leaving a terrified Jeff trapped in darkness. Mike restores the electricity and continues listening to the ninth and final tape, which reveals that one of Mary's malignant personalities, "Simon", was responsible for her murdering her family. Phil finds Gordon in Mary's former hospital room, staring at photos from his daughter's baptism which he has pasted to the wall. Jeff emerges from the tunnels and is attacked by an unseen assailant at the company van.

The following day, Gordon arrives at the hospital and finds Hank wrapped in plastic sheeting in one of the rooms, the lobotomy pick protruding from his eye. He is then confronted by Phil, who repeatedly tells him to "wake up" before vanishing. Craig witnesses Gordon standing over Hank, who is barely alive. Gordon attacks Craig before pulling the lobotomy pick from Hank's eye and stabbing it into Craig's. Gordon, in a dissociated state, finds the bodies of each of his men in various rooms in the hospital, and recounts his murdering each of them. He also recalls killing Wendy, his daughter and their dog after Wendy spilled the boiling water on him.

Distraught, Gordon confusedly attempts to call his home to apologize to Wendy. An excerpt from the ninth tape plays: Mary's doctor asks her "And where do you live, Simon?", to which "Simon" responds: "I live in the weak and the wounded, Doc."

== Cast ==
- Peter Mullan as Gordon Fleming
- David Caruso as Phil
- Stephen Gevedon as Mike
- Josh Lucas as Hank
- Brendan Sexton III as Jeff
- Jurian Hughes as Mary Hobbes (voice)
- Larry Fessenden as Craig McManus
- Paul Guilfoyle as Bill Griggs
- Lonnie Farmer as Doctor (voice)
- Charley Broderick as Security Guard
- Sheila Stasack as Wendy (voice)
  - Linda Carmichael as Wendy (physical appearance; uncredited)

== Themes and interpretations ==
=== Supernatural ===
In reviewing the film for the 2003 edition of The Year's Best Fantasy and Horror, Edward Bryant contends that Simon is not necessarily an alternate personality of the former patient Mary, but rather a malevolent genius loci. He also points out that the deleted scenes included on the DVD help fill out the narrative. Several critics have also pointed out similarities and references to Stanley Kubrick's The Shining (1980), which also deals with similar themes and involves a man's psychological unraveling in an isolated location. (Note: Attributed to multiple sources.)

Brian Keiper, writing for Bloody Disgusting, notes that "the real stories of Danvers are woven into the fabric of Session 9's plot, giving a sense of semi-documentary to elements of the proceedings. Though only tangential to the plot, Mike’s story of Patricia Willard (a fictional story created to illustrate a real trend) makes an important thematic point. It deals with the controversial subject of Satanic Ritual Abuse, the retrieval of repressed memories, and the questionable credibility surrounding such stories and practices." Keiper interprets the film's conclusion as intentionally ambiguous, rendering it unclear as to whether Gordon's deteriorating mental state and crimes are the result of a psychological disorder, or a demonic entity—the same entity that may have possessed Mary—utilizing him as a host. Psychiatry scholar Heike Schwarz echoes this sentiment, noting that the film contains dual interpretations, referring to "DID and a possible possession with a demonic personality".

Film scholar Duane W. Knight interprets the film's message as "a bleak one. Unlike other horror texts which reassure us that the monster can be located, defined by reason or generic convention as something that can be cured, neutralized, or expelled, Anderson underscores the idea that we have no recourse against this type of evil. Because it is supernatural, it exceeds Enlightenment reason; because it has no body, it exceeds all efforts to contain it. At the end of Anderson's film, we are left with the anxiety that, when the monster "lives in the weak and the wounded," it lives everywhere."

=== Social class ===
Writer Tony Rondinone notes themes regarding social class as prevalent in the film, quoting Anderson's statement that the film is "about the American Dream gone awry." Rondinone suggests that the film "makes the institution into a gothic metaphor for contemporary concerns. In this case, the institution represents the death of upward mobility... Deinstitutionalization went apace of deindustrialization. Dreams of a bright future turned into nightmares for both mental patients and the industrial working class at the same time." Rondinone cites the abatement crew's recurring discussions and disputes over money, dreams of different lives, and "exit strategies" from their hard physical labor as support of this.

== Production ==
=== Development ===
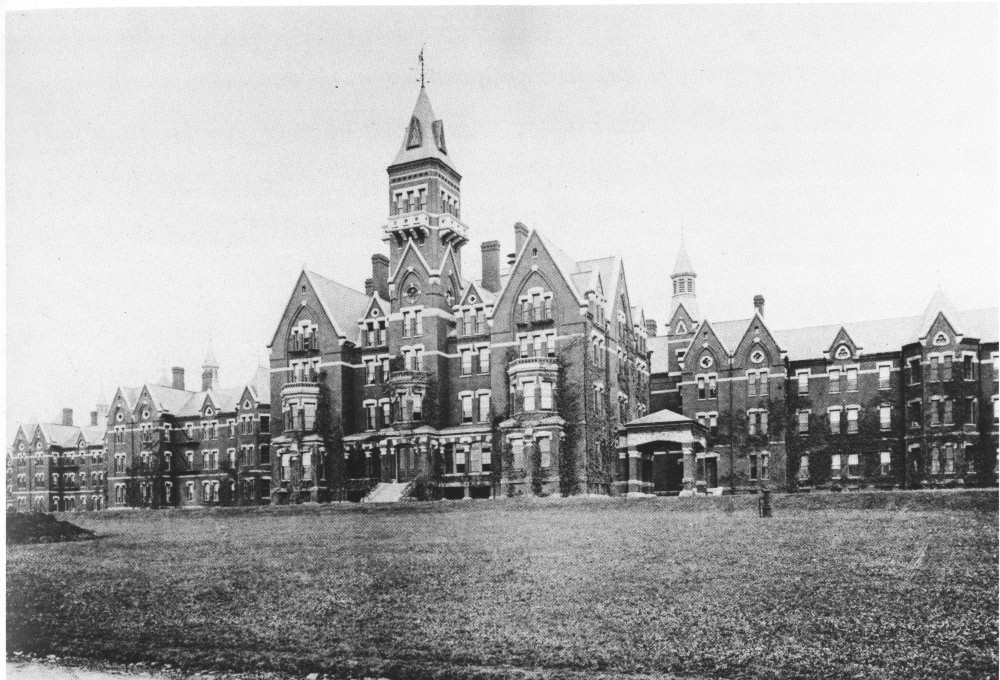
The film is set at the Danvers State Hospital (pictured in 1893), where it was also filmed

Session 9 was director Brad Anderson's first horror film, after directing two romantic comedy films, Next Stop Wonderland (1998) and Happy Accidents (2000). Anderson described Session 9 as an "American tragedy", and states that he and screenwriter Stephen Gevedon aimed "to subvert the conventions of the so-called horror genre that exists now", which he describes as "less horror than it is teen thriller."

The film's plot was inspired by the Richard Rosenthal case, a murder that took place in Boston, where Anderson grew up, in 1995, in which Rosenthal murdered his wife after she accidentally burnt his dinner, then cut out her heart and lungs and put them in his backyard on a stake. Anderson states that it was also, "as you imagine, very much inspired by the location", the Danvers State Psychiatric Hospital. Anderson had been residing in Boston in the late 1990s, and would frequently drive past the Danvers State Hospital: "When Steve and I were first brainstorming, we didn't have the framework of what we wanted to hang our horror film on. But then I remembered Danvers, and we thought it’d be cool to set a story [there], for a number of reasons. It would be contained, for one thing, and it would be maybe even more practical in terms of actually doing it, because we could keep it all in one location."

Don't Look Now, directed by Nicolas Roeg, was one inspiration for the film, for its sense of place and because the lead character realizes in the climax that he is at the heart of the mystery. Anderson also cited The Shining (1980) as an influence, specifically in the screenplay's sectioning of events by days of the week. Anderson has stated that he aimed to use sound to convey the plot as well as to generate "a creepy tone"; the sound design incorporated the subliminal use of animal and mechanical noises.

After pitching the project to USA Films, the studio agreed to distribute the film, with a production budget of approximately $1.5 million.

=== Casting ===
Anderson cast Peter Mullan in the lead role of Gordon, and had been a longtime admirer of his after seeing his performance in My Name Is Joe (1998). He also said that he felt that audiences "would be able to relate to him as a hard working blue-collar man with a new family." Josh Lucas was cast as Hank after auditioning for the part, and later commented that he was drawn to playing the character because he was "a working class asshole... he was just a prick, and it was terrific fun to play him that way." David Caruso was cast in the film at the suggestion of USA Films executives, who had a working relationship with him. Anderson commented that while Caruso was an "offbeat choice" for his role, the "combination felt very real to me—a little real because it wasn't predictable."

Brendan Sexton III was cast as Jeff, Gordon's nephew, based on the filmmakers' admiration of his performance in Welcome to the Dollhouse (1995). Larry Fessenden, an acquaintance of Anderson's, was given a minor role as Craig McManus, a replacement worker hired on the crew.

To prepare for their roles, as well as the potential exposure risks while filming in the hospital, the principal cast members went through asbestos abatement training.

=== Filming ===
Principal photography of Session 9 began in mid-September 2000 on location at the dilapidated Danvers State Hospital, where the film is set. According to actor David Caruso, the cast and crew were limited to only certain portions of the building as much of it was "unsafe" for shooting. Caruso claimed the sets largely did not need to be dressed as all the props featured in the film were already existing in the building. Elaborating, Caruso said:

It was a place you never got comfortable in. It wasn't like day three and we were throwing water balloons because it was so much fun to be there. It was always scary. You can really feel the pain of the people that went through Danvers. It's a rough environment. It's not fun. It's on the film. They didn't have to dress any sets, or anything. All of that stuff was sitting there. The federal government walked away from it about thirty years ago. It was a terrifying location.

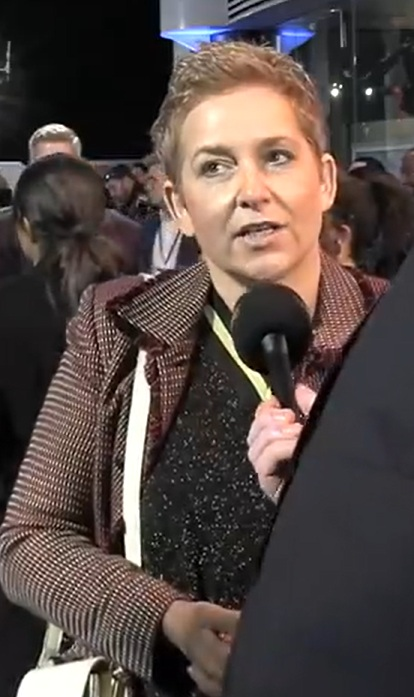
Cinematographer Uta Briesewitz shot the film in 24p HD digital video

Gevedon recalled that, "technically, no one was supposed to be in there. There was asbestos, the floors were collapsing, there were rusty pipes and lead paint everywhere. I mean, it was a disaster zone, much of that building. But somehow, I can't remember, our producers knew someone in the Massachusetts film office who knew someone in the Massachusetts government who was able to grease some wheels and get us permission to shoot there, as long as we stayed within certain confined areas."

Anderson stated that the majority of the set dressing consisted of "enhancing what was already there." The production designers made some slight additions, such as graffiti, as well as creating the collages covering the walls of Mary Hobbes's former room, which were inspired by similar patients' collages that the crew had found in the building. Crew members recalled occasionally finding medical tissue and blood samples in the building that had been left behind after the hospital's closure.

Session 9 was one of the first motion pictures to be shot in 24p HD digital video, which shoots at 24 frames-per-second like film, as opposed to regular digital video which shoots at 30 frames-per-second. The film was shot by German cinematographer Uta Briesewitz.

While filming the sequence in which Hank is pursued by a figure in the subterranean tunnels beneath the hospital, Briesewitz—who was operating a handheld camera—was injured after running into a medical cart that had been abandoned in the tunnel, striking her face on the metal prong of a surgical device. The prong punctured the camera's eyecup and punctured the corner of her eye socket, nearly piercing her eye. The injury paralleled the Hank character's eventual demise by a transorbital lobotomy, in which a lobotomy pick is forced into his eye socket.

=== Post-production ===
The majority of the film's post-production process involved the recording of the session tapes between Mary Hobbes (voiced by Jurian Hughes) and her doctor (voiced by Lonnie Farmer), as well as crafting soundscapes to accompany the film.

==== Alternate ending ====
Following test screenings for the film, Anderson excised several sequences in which it is revealed that a homeless woman squatting in the hospital could be the potential source for the strange occurrences experienced by the crew working there. In the film's finale, the woman, after fearfully witnessing Gordon murder each member of his crew, confronts him in Mary Hobbes's cell and bludgeons him to death with a flashlight. Anderson described this as a "misdirect," and chose to remove it as audience members incorrectly assumed the character to be Mary Hobbes.

== Soundtrack ==
Session 9

Soundtrack album by Climax Golden Twins
- Released: August 21, 2001
- Recorded: Gravelvoice Studio (Seattle, Washington)
- Genres: Ambient; dark ambient
- Length: 50:50
- Label: Milan

The original score to Session 9 was composed by the Seattle-based experimental band Climax Golden Twins. The score features elements of ambient and dark ambient music. The soundtrack was released on August 21, 2001, through Milan Records. "Chokechain" by Sentridoh is played over the closing credits of the film, but is not featured on the album. (Note: As noted in the film's closing credits.)

Track listing

All tracks are written by Climax Golden Twins (Scott Colburn, Robert Millis, Jeffrey Taylor), except "Piece for Tape Recorder", written and recorded by Vladimir Ussachevsky.

No.	Title	Length
1.	"A Few Simple Up and Down Jerks"	4:35
2.	"Hobbes Theme"	2:10
3.	"Noon, About Noon"	5:06
4.	"I Live in the Gut"	6:11
5.	"Mortified Pride"	1:41
6.	"Exit Plan"	2:14
7.	"I Want to Talk to Amy"	1:13
8.	"I Saw You"	2:01
9.	"Ward A"	5:56
10.	"Seclusion"	3:26
11.	"Disappointed Expectations"	10:39
12.	"Piece for Tape Recorder" (Vladimir Ussachevsky)	5:38

== Release ==
Session 9 premiered at the Fantasia International Film Festival on July 31, 2001. The film opened in Boston, Massachusetts at the Loews Common Theatre on August 8, 2001. It was given a limited theatrical release two days later on August 10, playing in Boston, New York City, and Los Angeles before expanding over the Labor Day weekend. It ended its American theatrical run on October 18, 2001.

=== Home media ===
USA Films and Universal Pictures Home Entertainment released VHS and DVD editions of Session 9 on February 26, 2002. A Blu-ray edition was released in August 2016 by Scream Factory. In the United Kingdom, a limited edition Blu-ray set was released by Second Sight Films on December 27, 2021.

== Reception ==
=== Box office ===
Session 9 earned $76,493 during its opening weekend, screening in Boston, Los Angeles, and New York City. The film eventually went on to gross a total of $378,176 in the United States. The film was a greater financial success abroad, earning $1.2 million in international markets.

=== Critical response ===
On the review aggregator website Rotten Tomatoes, 68% of 75 critics' reviews are positive, with an average rating of 7.1/10. The website's consensus reads: "Relying more on atmosphere than gore, Session 9 is effectively creepy." Metacritic, which uses a weighted average, assigned the film a score of 58 out of 100, based on 16 critics, indicating "mixed or average" reviews. Some critics praised the film's dark, eerie atmosphere and lack of gore. Entertainment Weekly called the film "a marvel of vérité nightmare atmosphere". Rolling Stone called it "a spine-tingler", and praised Brad Anderson's direction. Slant Magazine favorably compared it to the 1973 film Don't Look Now, writing, "Anderson's creeper is nowhere near as profound, but the film's old-fashioned pacing and revelatory camerawork bring to mind [Nicolas] Roeg's uniquely terrifying dreamworlds." Ron Wells of Film Threat praised the film's atmosphere and found it effectively frightening, awarding it four out of five stars.

Kevin Thomas of the Los Angeles Times said of the film: "Session 9 is so effective that its sense of uncertainty lingers long after the theater lights have gone up." Jeffrey M. Anderson of the San Francisco Examiner praised the film's psychological elements, noting: "The horrors in Session 9 are all internal—there are no ghosts or zombies or chainsaw-wielding maniacs, just shadows, strange images and half-seen clues." The Edmonton Journal's Todd Babiak similarly praised the film's sparse storytelling, writing: "Since the script never tries to explain all the evil in the universe, we don't have to endure weak and unsuccessful histories or philosophies. Instead, we get a small pocket of devilry that might just leap off the screen and infect us." Susanna Sonnenberg of the Missoulian found the film's characters well-written and realistic, adding that the screenplay's structure effectively "relies on what is suggested rather than presented, a sense of what might be there but isn't certain."

Some reviewers criticized the film's ending. A negative review came from Variety's Robert Koehler, who wrote, "while pic works up a nervously eerie paranoia, it finally doesn't know what to do with what it sets up." Edward Guthmann of the San Francisco Chronicle felt that "the story doesn't quite pay off, the characters are underwritten and the surprise ending is contrived and unconvincing." The Village Voice's Amy Taubin wrote, "the script for Session 9 is so underwritten that even such lively character actors as David Caruso, Peter Mullan and Brendan Sexton III are left stranded." The Boston Globe's Jay Carr similarly panned the film, writing that, as it progresses into its final act, "the store of ominousness shrinks and gives way to silliness, leaving some talented actors high and dry. As if cursed, Session 9 becomes glossy claptrap that plays like its own lobotomy."

Owen Gleiberman of Entertainment Weekly gave the film a B− rating, commending it as "a marvel of vérité nightmare atmosphere" but conceding: "This is a movie in which the 1970s and '80s loom as the graveyard of the psychoanalytic past, and there are tantalizing references to multiple personality disorder and repressed memory syndrome. The trouble is, they remain motifs, scripted rather than connected. The story, a potpourri of fright devices (midnight stalker, overly foreshadowed lobotomy maiming), keeps undercutting the grainy Blair Witch mood established by Anderson's intuitive camera eye." Dave Kehr, in a mixed review for The New York Times, praises the "impeccable" performances and the dialogue's "authentic working-class snap", but criticizes the pacing which "often feels long and aimless", and concludes that the film "loses any sense of urgency or structure" because of Anderson's choice to leave the connections between events unstated.

=== Accolades ===
Award/association	Year	Category	Recipient(s) and nominee(s)	Result	Ref.
Fangoria Chainsaw Awards	2002	Best Actor	Peter Mullan	Nominated	
Fangoria Chainsaw Awards	2002	Best Limited-Release/Direct-to-Video Film		Nominated	
Fright Meter Awards	2001	Best Horror Film		Won	
Sitges Film Festival	2001	Best Director	Brad Anderson	Won	
Sitges Film Festival	2001	Best Film	Brad Anderson	Nominated	

=== Modern appraisal ===
Session 9 developed a cult following in the years after its original release, mainly through DVD rentals and word of mouth. Bloody Disgusting ranked the film fifth in its list of the twenty best horror films of the 2000s, writing, "Session 9 isn't just a cheap, hack 'n' slash, instantly-forgettable type horror film, but a psychologically probing, deeply unsettling journey off the edge and into the abyss of the human mind." Brian Keiper, also writing for Bloody Disgusting, hailed it as "one of the most unsettling movies of the century so far." Actor Jim Cummings cited it as one of his favorite films in a 2020 interview with Entertainment Weekly, commenting: "There’s a 45-minute chunk in that film that is actually the most frightening thing I've ever seen. There’s this terrifying spooky inevitability in the film."

By 2021 it had been picked up for streaming by Netflix, and in its 20th anniversary year was screened at the Brooklyn Horror Film Festival. In a retrospectives for its twentieth anniversary, Marisa Mirabel of /Film called it an "underrated gem [that] was ahead of its time in terms of atmospheric and psychological horror." Also in 2021, Rolling Stone Australia ranked it number 47 in a list of the 65 best horror films of the 21st century.

Writer John Kenneth Muir praised the film in his book Horror Films of 2000–2009 (2023), writing: "Session 9 is a resourceful and careful film. It's a masterpiece of mood too; a low-budget horror film that succeeds by suggesting, not showing the forces at work in the characters. And the setting itself—especially the Psych Wing—is utterly terrifying."

== Related works ==
=== Proposed prequel ===
It was reported in August 2021 that Anderson and Gevedon had pitched a prequel to the film in 2020, which followed the Mary Hobbes character. However, the film's rights holder, Focus Features—a subsidiary of Universal Pictures—who had acquired USA Films shortly after the film's release, would not allow it. Anderson commented:

We did a lot of work on it, but this is how it went down: we did it before we talked to the powers-that-be at Focus, which now owns the intellectual property for Session 9, whether they knew it or not at the time. We wrote a pretty solid treatment for the script and were really excited about it. We had some producers that were really interested in doing it, and even financing it... Next thing you know we get the calls from the [Focus Features'] lawyer saying, "Well, you can't do that. We own that property, and we don't normally allow filmmakers to make sequels or prequels to our movies." And were like, "Well, we made the movie, you know what I mean? We just want to make a cool film based on the movie that you made with us, like, 18 years ago." And what it boiled down to was that, on purely legal terms, they just decided they didn't want to move forward with it.

In August 2026, following a screening of the film at Mass Mini Con in Boston for the film's twenty-fifth anniversary, Anderson revealed he was still developing the prequel, tentatively titled Session 1.

=== Novelization ===
On October 4, 2024, an official novelization of the film by writer Christian Francis was published through Echo On Publications.

== See also ==
- Genius (mythology) – referring to spirits such as a genius loci

== Sources ==
- Clark, Sean; Wallick, Buz (directors) (2016). Return to Danvers: The Secrets of Session 9. Session 9 (Blu-ray documentary featurette). Scream Factory. OCLC 958435197.
- Datlow, Ellen; Windling, Terri (2003). The Year's Best Fantasy and Horror: Sixteenth Annual Collection. New York City, New York: Macmillan. ISBN 0-312-31425-6.
- Knight, Duane W. (2008). ""I Live in the Weak and the Wounded": The Monster of Brad Anderson's Session 9". In Baumgartner, Holly Lynn; Davis, Roger (eds.). Hosting the Monster. Amsterdam, Netherlands: Rodopi. pp. 11–22. ISBN 978-904-2-02486-1.
- Muir, John Kenneth (2023). Horror Films of 2000–2009. Jefferson, North Carolina: McFarland & Company. ISBN 978-1-476-64450-9.
- Rondinone, Tony (2019). Nightmare Factories: The Asylum in the American Imagination. Baltimore, Maryland: Johns Hopkins University Press. ISBN 978-1-421-43268-7.
- Schwarz, Heike (2014). Beware of the Other Side(s): Multiple Personality Disorder and Dissociative Identity Disorder in American Fiction. Bielefeld, Germany: transcript Verlag. ISBN 978-3-839-42488-9.
