= Tea Cozies =

Tea Cozies are a band from Seattle, Washington. Inspired by the 1990s, their name was derived from the tea cosy designed to keep a pot warm. A reference to the band was quoted in Venus Zine in 2008 that their name "stems from their desire to call themselves something that would most likely appeal to knitters and British grandmothers."

== History ==
Founding members Jessi Reed and Brady Harvey met while attending school. The pair began covering songs for friends until they found a drummer. The three formed "Kesque" which was named for a Talking Heads lyric. The trio played only one show which took place in 2003. This band was originally based in Fort Collins, Colorado.

In 2004 Reed moved to Seattle, WA looking for a more vibrant music scene. Harvey and Viergutz followed suit over the next year and the trio reunited in Seattle with a new project called Tea Cozies. After meeting Jeff Anderson through mutual friends, they convinced him to join the band.

Tea Cozies released a self-titled EP which received airplay on Seattle radio station KEXP, scored a zombie film, and recorded a six-song Christmas album with a limited release. On May 5, 2009 they released their debut album Hot Probs, produced by Erik Blood of The Turn-Ons. The lead track, "Boys at the Metro", was recorded with Blood, who produced the song using Pro Tools, at The Mysterious X. The song, which was originally supposed to consist entirely of haikus, contains many insults directed at Steven Spielberg, which were influenced by Reed's hatred of Jaws. They have appeared in an episode of $5 Cover.

In 2018, Reed went on to form a new band, Robert Shredford, in her hometown of Fort Collins, Colorado. Robert Shredford released their debut single "Shreddy Betty" in 2019.

== Members ==
Jessi Reed – vocals, guitar

Brady Harvey – keyboards, vocals

Jeff Anderson – bass guitar

Garrett Croxon – drums

== Former members ==
Kelly Viergutz – drums

== Discography ==
Tea Cozies (EP, 2007 on As Seen On Records)

O Holy Christ (Christmas EP, 2007)

Nzumbe (film score, 2007)

Pretty Pages (single, 2008)

Hot Probs (LP, 2009 on So Hard Records)

Dead Man's Sister (single, 2010)

Cosmic Osmo (single, 2010)

Bang Up (EP, 2012)
