= Drunk Parents =

2019 film by Fred Wolf

- Release poster
- Directed by: Fred Wolf
- Written by: Peter Gaulke; Fred Wolf
- Produced by: Robert Ogden Barnum; Aaron L. Gilbert
- Starring: Alec Baldwin; Salma Hayek; Jim Gaffigan; Joe Manganiello; Ben Platt; Treat Williams
- Cinematography: Timothy A. Burton
- Edited by: Joseph McCasland
- Music by: Andrew Feltenstein; John Nau
- Production companies: Bron Studios; Creative Wealth Media
- Distributed by: Vertical Entertainment; DirecTV Cinema
- Release date: April 19, 2019 (United States)
- Running time: 97 minutes
- Country: United States
- Language: English
- Box office: $1.7 million

Drunk Parents is a 2019 American comedy film directed by Fred Wolf and written by Peter Gaulke and Fred Wolf. The film stars Alec Baldwin, Salma Hayek, Joe Manganiello, Natalia Cigliuti, Jim Gaffigan and Ben Platt.

The film was released on March 21, 2019, through DirecTV Cinema and it was also released in a limited release on April 19, 2019, by Vertical Entertainment. The film attained some attention and popularity after its release on video streaming platform Netflix in August 2020.

== Plot ==
Frank and Nancy Teagarten drive five hours to take their daughter Rachel to an Ivy League college to study to be a vet, then proceed to have a wild week. As soon as they arrive home, a Volvo towtruck comes to reposess their SUV, as their lease payments are late. Frank explains the root of his financial hardship, which stems from the fact that an artificial heart valve he had invested in got bad press and so he lost everything. The repo man takes pity on him, as he himself had been a paramedic, so says he will report he did not find them for now.

The next day, the Teagartens put many items from the house onto the front lawn, as if to sell them, yet dissuade people when they ask. Jason, a young wheelchair user Rachel had been dating, comes by and Frank teases him, to Nancy's chagrin.

In the morning, the inebriated couple discover Carl, a man answering an ad to rent Nigel's house, the neighbor who has been away for some months. They were given the key, and meant to look after it. As Frank is offered six month's rent paid in advance, he takes it. Soon after, Carl stops by with his parole officer to announce he is a convicted pedophile, per his legal obligation.

The Teagartens switch houses with Carl. So, later that night, other neighbors abduct them, believing they are the pedophiles. After threatening them, hoping to scare them into not causing problems in the neighborhood, the neighbors let them go.

== Cast ==
- Alec Baldwin as Frank Teagarten
- Salma Hayek as Nancy Teagarten
- Jim Gaffigan as Carl Mancini
- Joe Manganiello as Bob Donnelly
- Ben Platt as Jason Johnson
- Aasif Mandvi as Nigel
- Treat Williams as Dan Henderson
- Natalia Cigliuti as Betty Donnelly
- Michelle Veintimilla as Rachel Teagarten
- Olivia Luccardi as Jessie
- Aimee Mullins as Heidi Bianchi
- Scott Mescudi as Scottie, Tow Driver
- Kelly AuCoin as Tyler Rector
- Dan Soder as Randall
- Sasha Mitchell as Shope
- Stephen Gevedon as Tom
- Mark Gessner as Special Agent Chad Milhouse
- Will Ferrell as Will, The Bum (uncredited)
- Colin Quinn as Colin, The Bum

== Production ==
In September 2015, Alec Baldwin and Salma Hayek joined the cast of the film. On January 15, 2016, Joe Manganiello, Jim Gaffigan, Bridget Moynahan and Ben Platt joined the cast of the film. On February 8, 2016, Natalia Cigliuti joined the cast of the film. Principal photography began on January 13, 2016 in New York City.

== Release ==
In May 2017, it was announced Aviron Pictures had acquired distribution rights to the film. In September 2018, it was announced Vertical Entertainment and DirecTV Cinema would distribute the film instead. It was released through DirecTV Cinema on March 21, 2019. The film was also released in a limited release on April 19, 2019.
