= Final Warning (band) =

American hardcore punk band

- Final Warning in 1984, left to right: Jeff Paul, Tim Paul, Dan Cunneen and Simon

Background information
- Origin: Portland, Oregon
- Genres: Hardcore punk, heavy metal, crust punk
- Years active: 1982–1986

Final Warning was a Portland-based hardcore punk band active in the Pacific Northwest from 1982 to 1986. The band was notable for their anti-war political themes and as one of the early hardcore bands to incorporate heavy metal into their sound.

== History ==
Final Warning initially formed in 1982 as Broken Trust by guitarist Jeff "Simon" Simoncini, drummer Dan Cunneen, vocalist Tim Paul and bassist Charlie Nims (Nims would later play bass for Poison Idea using the moniker Myrtle Tickner). In 1983, former Poison Idea bassist Glenn Estes replaced Nims.

In early 1984, after changing their name to Final Warning, Tim Paul switched to bass and Jeff Paul (no relation) joined the group on vocals. This would become the classic Final Warning line-up that would remain until the band disbanded in 1986. (Poison Idea drummer Steve "Thee Slayer Hippie" Hanford did play several shows with Final Warning on second guitar in 1986.)

Final Warning released one self-titled 7-inch E.P. on Poison Idea guitarist Tom "Pig Champion" Roberts' label, Fatal Erection Records in 1984. The following year Final Warning had a song ("I Quit") on the Drinking is Great Portland punk compilation E.P. (also released by Fatal Erection).

Final Warning would share the bill with many notable bands during their career. Among them: Dead Kennedys, The Exploited, Charged GBH, Hüsker Dü, Minutemen and Mercyful Fate, but they never played outside the Pacific Northwest.

Members of Final Warning would go on to play in other Pacific Northwest bands, including: Napalm Beach, Poison Idea, The Obituaries, Big House, Gruntruck, Zipgun, Kill Sybil and the Seattle-based Nightcaps.

In June 2007, Southern Lord records released a 16-song compact disc that featured all the band's studio material and 11 songs recorded live in 1985 at the Starry Night in Portland, Oregon (where Final Warning opened for Danish black metal band Mercyful Fate at their first U.S. concert).

In September 2008, Final Warning played two shows with the classic line-up. The first show was in Seattle, Washington on September 6, 2008, at the Funhouse, followed by a show in Portland, Oregon at Satyricon, on September 20, 2008.

On March 3, 2013, Jeff Paul died in a motorcycle crash in Portland, Oregon.

In February 2015 Portland, Oregon-based Black Water Records released Demonstration 1983, a 9-song E.P. of Final Warning's first demo recordings.

== Influences ==
Final Warning was primarily influenced by early 1980s U.S. West Coast hardcore (Germs, Black Flag, Dead Kennedys, Crucifix, Iconoclast, and Circle Jerks) and the second wave of English punk (Discharge, Charged GBH, Disorder and The Exploited). What set Final Warning apart from other hardcore bands of the period was the merging of heavy metal into their sound (bands like Metallica, Motörhead, Venom and early Mötley Crüe.) Final Warning would combine these influences to become one of the early bands to combine punk and metal.

The most common lyrical focus of Final Warning's music was their stand against violence and war. Final Warning picked up on many of the anti-war themes that the U.K. band Discharge used and expanded them to include their own take on the conformity, complacency and militarism in the United States during the Reagan era.

== Discography ==
- 1983 Final Warning demo (self released cassette)
- 1984 Final Warning 7-inch EP (Fatal Erection)
- 1985 Track on Drinking Is Great 7-inch EP ("I Quit") (Fatal Erection)
- 2007 PDX CD (Southern Lord)
- 2008 Final Warning 7-inch EP (reissue) (Black Water)
- 2013 Demonstration 1983 CD (Rendezvous Recordings)
- 2015 Demonstration 1983 7-inch (Black Water)
