= Climax Golden Twins =

American experimental music band

Climax Golden Twins is an American experimental music band, formed in 1993 in Seattle, Washington by Robert Millis and Jeffery Taylor, who remain the primary song-writers and producers. The group notably performed the soundtrack to the 2001 cult horror film Session 9. Past members have included Dave Abramson, John Vallier and Scott Colburn. Millis and Taylor created the book Victrola Favorites: Artifacts From Bygone Days (Dust-to-Digital, 2008) which documented their respective 78 rpm collections and have also worked with members of A Frames as AFCGT releasing several LPs including the self-titled AFCGT on Subpop. Messenger Girls Trio is another related project that features Millis, Taylor, Dave Knott and Sir Richard Bishop that has produced two LPs of improvised collaged acoustic guitar music.

== Discography ==
Studio albums

- Climax Golden Twins 2 x 7 inch (1994)
- Climax Golden Twins 3 inch CD (1995)
- Imperial Household Orchestra (1996)
- Climax Golden Twins [Locations] (1998)
- Dream Cut Short in the Mysterious Clouds (2000)
- Climax Golden Twins (The Rock Album) (2001)
- Session 9 (2001)
- Lovely (2002)
- Highly Bred and Sweetly Tempered (2004) (North East Indie Records)
- Climax Golden Twins Conspiracy Records (2006)
- 5 Cents a Piece (2007)
- Journal of Popular Noise (2008)
- Eyeless Fabrication (2010)
- Climax Golden Twins (2022)
