= Stephen Gevedon =

American actor

- Occupation: Actor
- Years active: 1994–present

Stephen Gevedon is an American actor. Gevedon is known for his recurring roles on Show Me a Hero (2015), Madoff (2016), The Deuce (2017–2018). In 2001 he co-wrote the horror film Session 9, as well as appearing in it.

== Career ==
As an actor, Gevedon had recurring roles on the TV series Oz (1997), Show Me a Hero (2015), Madoff (2016), and The Deuce (2017–2018). He also portrayed Josiah Trelawny through performance capture in the 2018 video game Red Dead Redemption 2.

Gevedon co-wrote the 2001 horror film Session 9 with director Brad Anderson. By 2021, the film was considered a "cult classic", having been picked up for streaming by Netflix.

== Filmography ==
=== Film ===
Year	Title	Role	Notes
1995	Boys on the Side	Johnny Figgis	
1995	Smoke	Dennis the OTB Man #3	
1995	Blue in the Face	Dennis	
1996	The Side of the Road	Adam	Short
1997	States of Control	Alex the Playwright	
1997	L'amico di Wang	Sam Jordan	
1997	Paranoia	David	
1998	High Art	Man at Party	
1999	I'll Take You There	Chris	
1999	Zoo	Jared Foxx	
2000	Happy Accidents	Frenchman	
2001	Acts of Worship	Rick	
2001	Session 9	Mike	Also co-writer
2001	Eight	Derek	Short
2002	Bridget	Steven	
2002	Closing Time	Nick	Short
2003	Undermind	Jimmy Dimes	
2003	Music	Ebenezzer	Short
2005	Dog Eat Dog	Cellphone Man	Short
2005	War of the Worlds	Neighbor with Lawnmower	
2006	The Collector	Death	Short
2009	Frank the Rat	Roger	
2009	Children of Invention	Rob the Salesman	
2010	13	Death	Short
2012	Archaeology of a Woman	Doctor	
2012	Hellbenders	Clint	
2013	The Devil You Know	Max Pierce	
2015	The World Made Straight	Grandfather	
2015	Those People	Mr. Thornton	
2016	Catfight	Tom Ferguson	
2019	Drunk Parents	Tom	

=== Television ===
Year	Title	Role	Notes
1994	Star Trek: Deep Space Nine	Klingon #1	Episode: "Crossover"
1994	Fortune Hunter	Duke	Episode: "Sea Trial"
1995	New York Undercover	Oscar Tirado	Episode: "Bad Girls"
1995	Law & Order	Edward Brennig	Episode: "Switch"
1996	Swift Justice	Jake Turkell	Episode: "Sex, Death and Rock 'n' Roll"
1997	Oz	Scott Ross	Recurring Cast: Season 1
1997	Prince Street	-	Episode: "Drugs, Lies and Videotape"
1998	Law & Order	Russell Lowery	Episode: "Stalker"
2000	NYPD Blue	Jerry Deluca	Episode: "Loogie Nights"
2003	Law & Order: Special Victims Unit	Nicholas Taylor	Episode: "Pandora"
2008	Law & Order	David	Episode: "Sweetie"
2009	The Naked Brothers Band	Bob Uhaul	Episode: "Valentine Dream Date"
2009	Law & Order: Criminal Intent	Chris Palarno	Episode: "Playing Dead"
2010	White Collar	Daniel Reed	Episode: "Hard Sell"
2010	Warren the Ape	Rodney Cassidy	Episode: ""Support System""
2010	Rubicon	DIA	Episode: "A Good Day's Work"
2011	Nurse Jackie	Businessman	Episode: "Mitten"
2015	Show Me a Hero	Jack O'Toole	Recurring Cast
2016	Madoff	Robert Jaffe	Recurring Cast
2017–18	The Deuce	Bernie Wolf	Recurring Cast: Season 1–2
2019–20	At Home with Amy Sedaris	Antonin Thornberry	Guest Cast: Season 1–2
2022	East New York	DEA Arliss Gruen	Episode: "CompStat Interruptus"

=== Video games ===
Year	Title	Role	Notes
2018	Red Dead Redemption 2	Josiah Trelawny	Performance capture
2019	Red Dead Online	Josiah Trelawny	Performance capture
