= The Catch (American band) =

American rock band

The Catch was a rock band from Seattle, Washington. Formed by Carly Nicklaus (U.S.E), Amy Rockwell (Dolour, U.S.E), Jenny Jimenez on bass guitar and Alissa Newton on drums. The group released their first album Get Cool on Made In Mexico Records in May 2005. Jimenez and Newton later left the group, to be replaced by Shane Berry and Garrett Lunceford of The Divorce. Justin Harcus later replaced Berry.

== Members ==
- Carly Nicklaus – guitar, lead vocals
- Amy Rockwell – keyboards, backup vocals
- Justin Harcus – bass
- Garrett Lunceford – drums

Past members

- Laura Mott – keyboards
- Amanda Findley – Bass
- Jenny Jimenez – bass
- Alissa Newton – drums
- Shane Berry – bass

== Discography ==
- Get Cool (Made In Mexico, 2005)
