= The Obituaries =

- Origin: Portland, Oregon, United States
- Genres: Post-punk, punk rock, rock, blues
- Years active: 1986–1986, several reunions since mid-2000s.

The Obituaries were an American punk, rock, and blues band from Portland, Oregon, United States. The band was most active from 1986 to 1990, although they have played several reunion shows since 2007. Described by Willamette Week writer Jason Simms as "The missing link between The Wipers and Nirvana," the Obituaries are notable as one of the most successful bands in the Pacific Northwest club scene of the late 1980s.

The Obituaries were known for the fiery voice and unpredictable stage presence of vocalist Monica Nelson. Guitarist Rob Landoll anchored the band with his blues-based punk riffs. In addition to being the band's principal songwriters, Nelson and Landoll were the only constant members during the band's career.

== History ==
The Obituaries were formed in 1986 by singer Monica Nelson, guitarist Rob Landoll, bassist Laura O'Donnell and drummer Aaron MacMahon. After the addition of bassist John Allan Naylor and drummer Dan Cunneen (Final Warning, Zipgun, Nightcaps), the group quickly gained a reputation in Portland and was soon headlining venues like Satyricon and Pine Street Theatre. The Obituaries released a cassette in late 1986 and a 6-song vinyl EP in 1987 on their own label, Highgate Records.

The band had several rhythm section changes. In addition to Cunneen, former drummers include: Dave Triebwasser (Pond) and Rudy Apodaca. John Blender and Regina LaRocca (Oily Bloodmen, Caustic Soda, M99) also played bass for the band.

The Obituaries toured throughout the Western U.S. and shared the bill with many notable bands during their career, including: Green River, Mother Love Bone, Sonic Youth, Nick Cave, Alex Chilton, The Gits, Babes In Toyland, The Descendents, Dead Moon, Soundgarden and Nirvana.

The band reformed for several shows in 2007 in conjunction with the release of a retrospective CD with Nelson, Landoll, LaRocca, and Mahone.

In 2010, The Obituaries released the CD Ghost, a 9-song acoustic set.

In 2014, Monica Nelson formed Monica Nelson and the Highgates with former Obituaries member John Alan Naylor on guitar, Jeffrey Larson (bass) and Joe Sanderson (drums).

== Discography ==
- 1986 Demo (self-released cassette)
- 1987 The Obituaries (12" EP, Highgate)
- 1990 Prologue (7" single, red vinyl, Audio Addict)
- 2007 The Obituaries (Compilation CD, Highgate)
- 2010 Ghosts (CD, Highgate)
