= SixTwoSeven =

American rock band

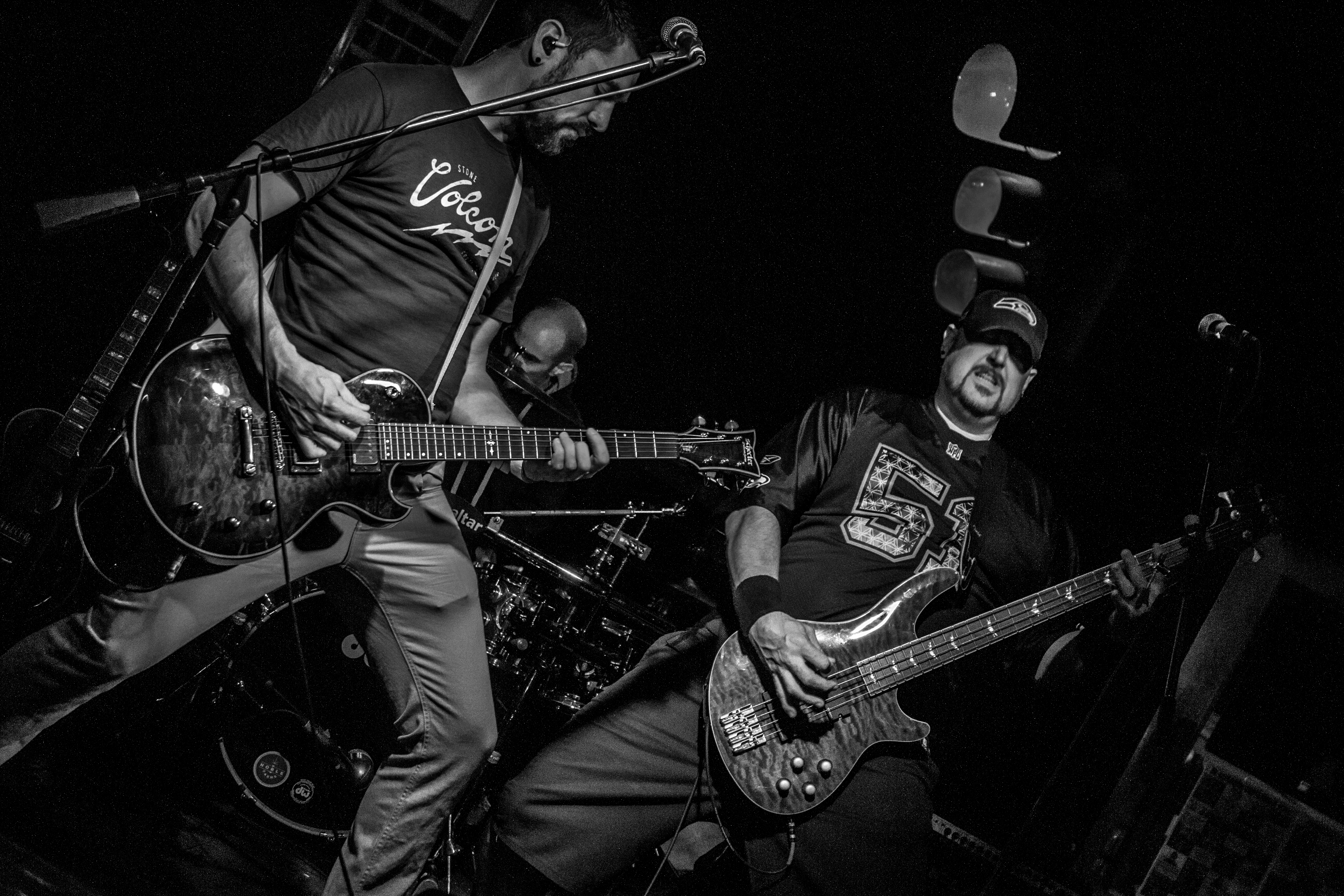

Background information
- Origin: United States
- Genre: Alternative rock
- Label: Dubseven Records
- Members: Greg Bilderback; Jason Bilderback; Mike Knapp; Nat Linville; Matt Bilderback
- Website: www.dubsevenrecords.com

SixTwoSeven is an American alternative rock and roll band out of Gig Harbor, Washington created by Greg Bilderback. Bilderback later brought Michael Knapp in to help produce. Also playing bass Knapp helped Bilderback establish the original line up of SixTwoSeven in 2016. After bringing in Drummer David Cook, Bilderback & Knapp brought in siblings Jason and Matt Bilderback before heading into the studio. In spring of 2016 SixTwoSeven recorded their first EP with DubSeven Records at A Soundhouse Studio in Seattle Washington with Legendary Sub Pop Producer Jack Endino. The release of the EP titled Some Others Day came in August that same year. After their first West Coast Tour with Texas band Drive On Mak they headlined Rock Shows from Portland to L.A., including a stop in Roswell New Mexico for the International Film Festival of 2017 (where the band was nominated for a ROSSI Award for Best Rock Band). Tour plans took the band back to L.A. in the summer of 2017 appearing at the world famous Whisky a Go Go with Agent Orange. DubSeven Records subsequently released a promotional video of this entire 30 minute performance. Plans were leaked from DubSeven Headquarters that a full-length LP was to be released in winter of 2018. The LP titled Already Gone / Dead on the Table was released in September (29th) after a string of singles and B sides throughout the summer of 2018, which included an "on-board" music video for New Solutions where Bilderback is seen skateboarding. The record debuted at #497 on the College Radio Charts, and broke into the top 150 the first week of October at #141, reaching as high as #135. It was produced by illfunk, mastred by Endino, and released on DubSeven Records. In late 2020 DubSeven Records and SixTwoSeven dropped a series of singles and videos starting with The Mistrial / Motormouth, Small Craft Advisory / An Engineer's Lament (Halloween Video), and One Night Stand / Escape Clause.

== History ==
SixTwoSeven released their debut EP Some Other's Day courtesy of DubSeven Records, on August 5, 2016. SixTwoSeven is a five-piece rock band composed of Greg "illfunk" Bilderback on guitar and vocals, Jason "J Danger" Bilderback on rhythm guitar, Mike "MK Ultra" Knapp on the bass, Dave "Dee Cee" Cook on Drums, and another Bilderback brother, Matt "the Machine" Bilderback on keys and vocals.

The band formed in 2016 after "illfunk" had been pushing the Self Produced Demo "Allow me for a moment...if you will...to be Frank" on the web for several years. The demo, featuring 7 songs recorded and played entirely by Bilderback (Greg) himself, began gaining notoriety online, and prompted him to put together a live show line up, and by mid March 2016 videos began surfacing of the 3-piece performing live. By the end of March a decision was made to add J Danger to the line up for the recording and ensuing tour. A few short weeks later, while in the studio recording "Some Other's Day" with Nirvana Producer Jack Endino at Soundhouse Studios in Seattle (also known for his work with Mudhoney, and Soundgarden), another Bilderback was brought in. Initially thought just to provide support for backing vocal tracks on the CD, the band and Endino fell in love with Matt's harmonic contributions, and shortly thereafter a Nord Stage Keyboard Sponsorship was awarded to the Machine so that he could join the band on stage. The album was mastered by Grammy Award Nominee Joe Lambert (The Revenant).

A West Coast Tour with Austin TX Punk-a-billy Drive On Mak, took place in the Summer of 2016, with stops in Seattle, Olympia, San Jose, Los Angeles and Portland. The band shared the stage with Drive on Mak, as well as Portland up and comers the Welkin Dim.

In early 2017, the band parted ways with drummer David Cook, and Matt "The Machine" Bilderback moved from keys to full time drummer of the band. The band is currently a 5-piece with the addition of Nat Linville.

Other projects involving members of SixTwoSeven over time have included, Wheelchair, Five Hoss Cartwrights, Test Proof Positive, the Phil Bilderback Trio, Alpine Frequency, Victor Cutoff, Drive on Mak, Jason and the ArgoScotts, illfunk and MC MD, illfunk and DJ Mindbender, and Bork Laser

== Musical Influences ==
The band has been known to describe their sound with the line "The attitude of an Underdog, with the punch of a champion". Bilderback is a self proclaimed Muse and Foo Fighters fanatic, and influences can be heard in his music from Dinosaur Jr, Queens of the Stone Age, Weezer, Radiohead, and Royal Blood. They have been described as blue collar rock and roll band, with a heavy guitar riff driven sound not unlike that of AC/DC of stadium rock lore. The band has also described their sound as "A precisely measured combination of elements: Equal parts Punk, Grunge, Alt and Stadium Rock, with a dash of smashed computer parts and broken glass. Garage Filtered for your listening pleasure." Others say it is "Major League Rock and Roll."

== Band members ==
=== Current ===
- Greg Bilderback – lead guitar, lead vocals (2010–present)
- Mike Knapp – bass, backing vocals (2016–present)
- Matt Bilderback – drums, backing vocals (2017–present), Keyboards (2016)
- Jason Bilderback – guitar, backing vocals (2016–present)
- Nat Linville - guitar (2019–present)

=== Former ===
- David Cook – Drums (2016–2017)

== Discography ==
- Allow me for a moment...if you will...to be Frank - 2011 DubSeven Records
- Wreckless Soul (Single) - Digital Only - 2016 DubSeven Records
- Some Other's Day - 2016 - DubSeven Records
- Some Other's Day (Deluxe Edition) - 2017 DubSeven Records
- Heaven Knows / Runnin' with the Big Kids (single) - 2018 DubSeven Records
- Already Gone / Dead on the Table (single) - 2018 DubSeven Records
- New Solutions / A Winter in Palmyra (single) - 2018 DubSeven Records
- Already Gone / Dead on the Table (LP) - 2018 DubSeven Records
- The Mistrial / Motormouth (Single) - 2020 DubSeven Records
- Small Craft Advisory / An Engineer's Lament - 2020 DubSeven Records
- One Night Stand / Escape Clause - 2020 DubSeven Records
