= Kay Kay and His Weathered Underground =

American indie band

- Also known as: Kay Kay
- Origin: Seattle, Washington, US
- Genres: Indie rock, Psychedelic pop, Jazz
- Years active: 2005 - 2013
- Labels: Bombs Over Bellevue, ECA Records
- Members: Kirk Huffman; Kyle O'Quin; Phil Peterson

Kay Kay and His Weathered Underground is an indie band started by Kirk Huffman and Kyle O'Quin of Gatsbys American Dream. Like Gatsbys, the band is influenced by a wide variety of musical genres. Though the band only has three official members, they have been known to perform with as many as 11 additional musicians on stage.

== History ==
Kay Kay got its start when Gatsbys American Dream went on hiatus, shortly after the release of their 2006 self-titled album. Huffman and O'Quin had been writing songs together while on tour and brought in Huffman's friend Phil Peterson to round out the group.

The band first released a handful of tracks for streaming on Purevolume and MySpace. These songs later appeared on a cassette single released by ECA Records in 2006.

A copy of the band's cassette found its way to John Sidel of V2 Records. The band signed an initial agreement to record a full-length album, but V2 was bought out by Universal Music shortly thereafter and a finalized contract never materialized.

In early 2007, the band released Live at the Pretty Parlor, a two-disc set featuring a live DVD and accompanying CD. The DVD was filmed at an independent clothing store in Seattle in late 2006 and released on the band's own label, Bombs Over Bellevue.

In mid-2007, they played their first out-of-state shows in Los Angeles and Portland, Oregon. On June 13, 2007, the band made their national television debut on Last Call with Carson Daly. According to Huffman, the band's DVD found its way into the hands of Carson Daly who then pushed to have the band on the show. The band performed "Hey Momma," reducing the song's length due to time constraints.

On February 19, 2008, the band released their debut self-titled album on vinyl through Vinyl Collective, a subsidiary of Suburban Home Records. The album is a double LP (with a digital download code included) and pressed in three variations, totaling 1,000 copies: rainbow transparent vinyl (200), rainbow milk vinyl (300), and orange with red speckles (500). The album was also made available digitally through several retailers, including Amazon MP3, iTunes and eMusic. To celebrate the album's release, the band played a sold-out show at The Triple Door in Seattle, where Huffman declared "I thought we’d be playing for ten people. This is the greatest night of my life." The band was also featured in Seattle weekly newspaper The Stranger for the album release.

In August 2008, the band embarked on their first west-coast tour in support of Rx Bandits and Portugal. The Man, with dates running from August 12 to September 1.

On July 17, 2008, the band posted a Myspace blog stating that they were already half way through recording their second full-length titled Introducing Kay Kay and His Weathered Underground. This blog was accompanied by a new song, titled "Diggin."

Kay Kay toured the US in support of mewithoutYou through the summer of 2009 and when they returned on August 10, 2009, the band announced they had finished the recording of Introducing Kay Kay and His Weathered Underground. The album was streamed in its entirety on the band's Myspace/Facebook/Purevolume pages starting August 14.

In the summer 2010 Kay Kay did a US tour with Damien Jurado where members filled in as his backing band following the release of his "St. Bartlett" album.

In early 2011 Kay Kay both digitally and physically released their sophomore effort "Introducing..." via their own imprint Bombs over Bellevue and SUburban Home Records/Vinyl Collective and completed a full US tour in support of the record with The Dear Hunter and O' Brother.

The band announced a small string of west coast dates in February 2012 with Anthony Green and The Dear Hunter and confirmed that they would be recording a new record, tentatively titled III, that year. It is not yet confirmed but, the band is apparently on hiatus.... (but there has been no official statement regarding the bands status). Most believe it is the result of Kyle O'Quin joining Portugal. The Man. Huffman has since been recording and releasing music under the Real Don Music moniker.

== Members ==
According to the band's Myspace page, the official members are:

- Kirk Huffman - lead vocals, guitar, percussion
- Kyle O'Quin - keys
- Phil Peterson - cello, backing vocals

=== Additional musicians ===
The following is an incomplete list of musicians who are not officially a part of the band, but accompanied the band on their album and for live performances.

- Thomas Hunter - guitar
- Racheal Huffman - backing vocals, percussion
- Nate Mooter - bass
- J. J. Jang - violin
- Victoria (Tori) Parker - violin, backing vocals
- Robert (Bobby) Parker - trumpet, flugelhorn, backing vocals
- Tom Pfaeffle - sound engineer/producer
- Joey Seward - tuba
- Samuel Anderson- cello
- Andy Lum - drums
- Garrett Lunceford - drums
- Devin Ensz - Tuba
- James Prow - Bass
- Megan Homer - violin
- Scott Macpherson - Saxophones
- Eric Padget - trumpet
- Aaron Benson - drums
- Eric Howk - guitar

== Discography ==
- Kay Kay and His Weathered Underground (2006, ECA Records) - Cassette tape featuring 3 early songs later released on their self-titled album.
- Live at the Pretty Parlor (2007, Bombs Over Bellevue) - Live DVD/CD release recorded at a clothing store in Seattle.
- Kay Kay and His Weathered Underground (2008, Suburban Home/Vinyl Collective) - Studio album. Vinyl color variations: 200 on Transparent Rainbow, 300 on Rainbow Milk, 500 on Orange w/ Red Speckles. 2nd pressing vinyl on unspecified number of standard blue
- Diggin' (2008, Suburban Home/Vinyl Collective) - 7" featuring 2 tracks ("Diggin'" and "All My Friends Passed Out"), taken from the forthcoming album Introducing.... Includes downloadable versions of both songs. Vinyl color variations: 300 on Green, 700 on Clear
- Introducing Kay Kay and His Weathered Underground (February 8, 2011) - Second full-length studio album. Vinyl color variations: 300 on White, 700 on Translucent Red
- Experimeducation vol. I (2012, Bombs Over Bellevue)
- III (TBA)

== See also ==
- Gatsbys American Dream
