= Hobosexual =

American rock duo

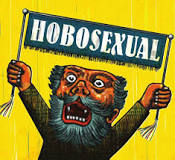

Background information
- Origin: Seattle, Washington, United States
- Genres: Indie rock, experimental rock, alternative rock, garage rock
- Years active: 2009–present
- Members: Ben Harwood; Jeff Silva; Sophia “Chuggy” Tlen
- Website: www.hobosexualband.com

Hobosexual is a Seattle rock duo composed of singer/guitarist Ben Harwood and drummer Jeff Silva. Assembled in 2009, the band has released two CDs and completed several West Coast tours as well as selling a line of action figures.

== History ==
Hobosexual began with members Ben Harwood and Matt Ehlers in early 2009. Ben Harwood founded the band Vindaloo and joined IceAge Cobra before forming Hobosexual, named to provide an expectation of the band's appearance. After Matt Ehlers left the band in May 2010, Jeff Silva, who also hailed from Vindaloo as well as bands The Beautiful Mothers & The Second Academy, joined on drums.

After the release of their self-titled first album, Hobosexual played several local venues and quickly produced their follow-up album, Hobosexual II. Their third album, Monolith, was released in 2017.

== Television and film ==
The band was featured in the Marco Collins' documentary The Glamour & The Squalor directed by Marq Evans which debuted at the 2015 Seattle International Film Festival.

Tracks from the first self-titled album, Hobosexual, "Boogieshuttle" and "Concrete Corporate", were featured on Showtime's Shameless.

Music from Hobosexual II was featured during two of the Seattle Seahawks' nationally televised games in the 2013 Super Bowl season.

== Reception ==
Their second album, Hobosexual II, was listed as one of the top albums of 2013 in Seattle.

== Discography ==
- Hobosexual
- Hobosexual II
- Monolith
