= Perkins Coie Band =

- Perkins Coie Band, 2013; Left to right: Steve Harrold, Arunas Bura, Harry Schneider, Dan Cunneen, Tor Midtskog, Al Smith (not pictured: Garth Brandenburg)

Background information
- Origin: Seattle, Washington, USA
- Genres: Rock and roll, British Invasion, Garage
- Years active: 1999–Present
- Members: Arunas Bura (vocals); Al Smith (keyboard, vocals); Harry Schneider (guitar, vocals); Garth Brandenburg (guitar); Tor Midtskog (guitar); Steve Harrold (bass); Dan Cunneen (drums)

The Perkins Coie Band (also known as PCBs) is the in-house band for the Seattle, Washington based international law firm Perkins Coie. The band formed in 1999 to play the law firm’s holiday party and continues to play charity and firm-related events.

Throughout the 2000s, the Perkins Coie Band performed in (and won) several Lawyerpalooza concerts (a Battle of the Bands benefit held annually from 2004 to 2008 in Seattle). In May 2008 the band was selected as regional semi-finalists in Fortune magazine's Fortune Battle of the Corporate Bands in Los Angeles, California.

Most of the band’s members work at Perkins Coie (most notably, partners Harry Schneider and Al Smith). Other band members include Arunas Bura (paralegal), Garth Brandenburg (legal messenger), and former employee Tor Midstkog. In addition, there are two “ringers” that are not employed by the company, Steve Harrold and Dan Cunneen.

The band primarily performs a mix of 1960s American rock and roll, British Invasion and garage (or Frat Rock).
