= Posse (band) =

- Origin: Seattle, Washington, U.S.
- Genres: indie-rock
- Labels: Badhrecords
- Members: Paul Wittmann-Todd; Sacha Maxim; Jon Salzman
- Past members: Nicolas Heliotis

Posse were an American indie rock band from Seattle, Washington. They were made up of Paul Wittman-Todd (guitar/vocals), Sacha Maxim (guitar, bass, vocals) and Jon Salzman (drums) Their 2014 album Soft Opening received a 7.9 from Pitchfork.

== History ==
The band formed in 2010 after Paul met Sacha at a local lesbian bar. After bonding over music they added Jon on drums who used to play in one of Sacha's previous bands. The band continue to work their day jobs whilst making music and touring with Sacha Maxim working as a graphic designer at Microsoft, Paul Wittmann-Todd, working as an electrical engineer at Fluke Corp, which makes industrial testing equipment and Jon Salzman working with children affected by autism.

In November 2017 the band released their final album before parting ways. In a review on Pitchfork, it was described as a 'Great parting gift'.

== Discography ==
=== Albums ===
- Horse Blanket (2017)
- Soft Opening (2014)
- Self Titled (2012)

=== EPs ===
- Some Dongs (2012)
