= Zipgun =

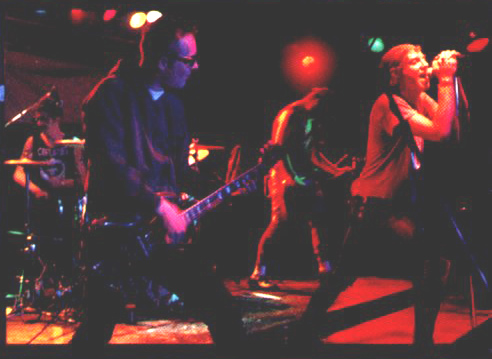
- Zipgun 1992 (l to r) Dan Cunneen, Neil Rogers, Mark Wooten, Robb Clarke

Background information
- Origin: Seattle, Washington, United States
- Genres: Punk rock
- Years active: 1991–1994
- Labels: Empty, Thrill Jockey, Rekkids, Musical Tragedies

Zipgun were an American punk rock band from Seattle, Washington, United States, primarily active from 1991 to 1994. The original founding members were: guitarist Neil Rogers (The Derelicts, Glazed), singer Robb Clarke (Trids, RC5, The Burnz), bassist Mark Wooten (The Zanny Guys, Noble Firs) and drummer Dan Cunneen (Final Warning, The Obituaries, Seattle's Nightcaps,).

== History ==
Zipgun was formed and led by Neil Rogers, who had previously played guitar for Sub Pop recording artists The Derelicts. In early 1991, The Derelicts disbanded, and Rogers quickly sought to form a new project. He had previously recruited bassist Mark Wooten for a late incarnation of The Derelicts. Following that band's breakup, the duo completed the new lineup by recruiting Seattle-based singer Robb Clarke and drummer Dan Cunneen (who had recently relocated to Seattle from Portland, Oregon).

In 1993, Mark Wooten quit the band and was replaced by bassist Andy Sheen. In late 1993 Sheen quit the band and was briefly replaced by former Derelicts bassist Ian Dunsmore.

Zipgun broke up in 1994 and then reunited in 1996 for a single show at The Breakroom in Seattle with original bassist, Mark Wooten.

== Background ==
While Zipgun hailed from Seattle in the early 1990s, their music is not considered Grunge. Zipgun was one of a number of Seattle bands that avoided the prevailing musical trend, playing punk rock. Other Seattle bands sharing the same philosophy during the era include: Gas Huffer, Supersuckers, The Gits, and Coffin Break.

The band was known for their "punk and roll" sound, which is characterized by its raw energy and power; delivered at slower tempos than typical American hardcore. Zipgun mined punk rock influences like The Stooges, Ramones, The Damned, and Buzzcocks. They also added elements of then-current bands like Screaming Trees and Mudhoney into their sound.

Zipgun was also known for their unpredictable stage performances and sometimes volatile interaction between singer Robb Clarke and guitarist Neil Rogers. (For instance, at their alcohol fueled debut show at Seattle's Crocodile Cafe, Rogers famously broke his Gibson SG guitar over Clarke's back.)

== Legacy ==
Lead singer Robb Clarke died in 2019. In 2017, Rogers reformed The Derelicts with original vocalist Duane Lance Bodenheimer; Rogers performed with the group until Bodenheimer's death in 2024. Drummer Dan Cunneen subsequently formed and led Seattle's Nightcaps, later becoming the front-man for Roxbury Saints. Bassist Rob Wooten, who has performed with numerous Pacific Northwest bands, also plays for the Roxbury Saints.

== Discography ==
- 1991 Together Dumb/Cool in the Cell (single) Empty Records
- 1991 Ten (one sided promo single) Empty Records
- 1992 8 Track Player (CD/LP) Empty Records
- 1992 The End/Nothing Cures (single) Musical Tragedies
- 1993 Put Me Away (split single w/ Derelicts) Rekkids
- 1993 Baltimore (CD/LP) Empty Records
- 1994 I Can't Wait/Tight Black Pants (single) Thrill Jockey Records
