= Dan Cunneen =

American musician and DJ

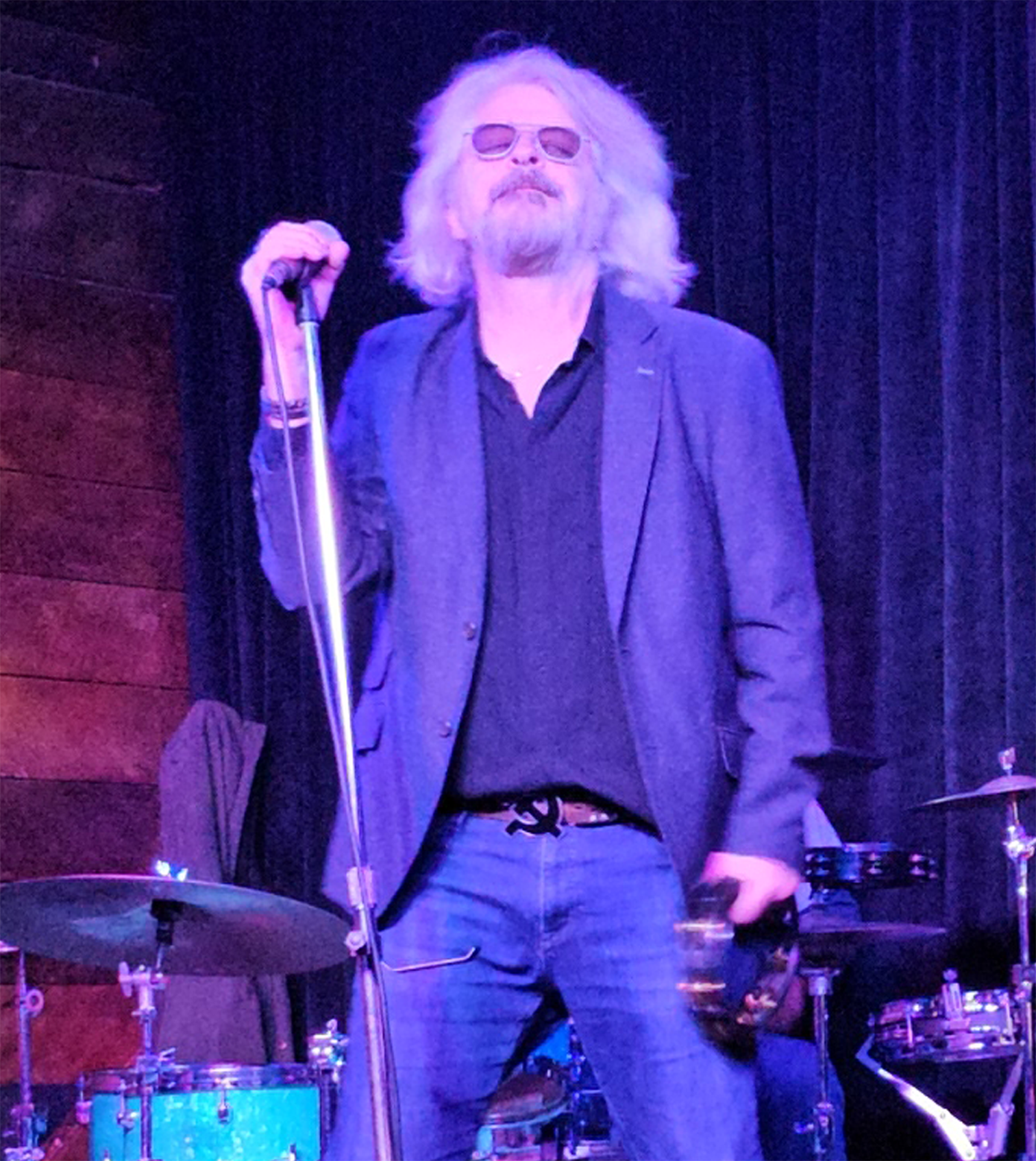
- Cunneen performing in 2025

Background information
- Also known as: Dan Steely, DJ Diamondan, The Russian Dragon
- Born: Daniel Robert Cunneen; March 14, 1963 (age 63)
- Origin: Portland, Oregon
- Genres: Punk rock, rock, heavy metal, soul, lounge music
- Occupations: Musician; Songwriter; Disc jockey Graphic designer Screen printer
- Instruments: Vocals, drums, guitar, bass
- Years active: 1982–present
- Labels: Fatal Erection, Highgate, New Weave, Empty, Sub Pop, Rendezvous Recordings, Estrus, V2, Southern Lord, ORANJ
- Website: dancunneen.com

Dan Cunneen (a.k.a. Dan Steely) is an American musician, songwriter, disc jockey, screen printer and graphic designer originally from Portland, Oregon, United States. He is best known for his drumming with the 1980s Portland bands Final Warning and The Obituaries, as well as the 1990s Seattle bands Zipgun and Nightcaps. In 2020, Cunneen began recording under the moniker Dan Steely. He occasionally plays drums with the Perkins Coie Band (a.k.a. PCBs), the in house band for the Seattle law firm Perkins Coie. Cunneen is currently the lead singer and principal songwriter for the Seattle-based band Roxbury Saints.

On January 3, 2015, Cunneen was ordained as a minister in the Universal Life Church.

== Musician ==
Cunneen formed his first band, Final Warning, in 1982 with Jeff "Simon" Simoncini, bassist Tim Paul and vocalist Jeff Paul. Final Warning was notable for its anti-war political themes and as one of the early hardcore bands to incorporate heavy metal into their sound.

After Final Warning broke up in 1987, Cunneen played drums with Portland-based folk-rock singer songwriter Lew Jones. Later that year, he joined the punk, rock, and blues band, The Obituaries, a significant part of the 1980s Portland underground scene alongside bands like Napalm Beach, Dead Moon, and Poison Idea. Cunneen played drums and co-wrote one song on The Obituaries EP, but left the band mid-tour in 1989.

After relocating to Seattle in 1991, Cunneen formed the punk band Zipgun with guitarist Neil Rogers, singer Robb Clarke and bassist Mark Wooten. Zipgun released three singles and two full-length albums on Pacific Northwest independent record label Empty Records and several singles on various labels. Zipgun toured extensively throughout the United States and Canada and appeared in the Doug Pray film Hype!, which chronicled Seattle Grunge music scene of the 1990s.

Following Zipgun's dissolution in 1995, Cunneen formed and led the Seattle-based lounge band, Nightcaps with vocalist Theresa Hannam, guitarist Garth Brandenburg and bassist William Herzog. Nightcaps were an integral part of the mid 1990s Lounge music resurgence that included bands such as Combustible Edison, Squirrel Nut Zippers and Love Jones. The Nightcaps were known for avoiding irony and kitsch.

In 2011, Rendezvous Recordings released Cunneen's "The Answer b/w Shoot & Share" solo 7-inch single. He described the two songs as "Black comedy metal, combining lyrical irony with metallic garage-punk musical sensibilities."

In 2020, under the name "Dan Steely", Cunneen released a single and music video of the Electric Light Orchestra song "Showdown". The seven-inch single's B-side features a remix of the A-side, "Showdown (DJ Yot Roc Mix)", in the yacht rock style.

== Disc jockey ==
In 1994, using the moniker "DJ DiamonDan", Cunneen began what would become a two-year DJ residency at Linda's Tavern in Seattle. Throughout the 1990s and 2000s he performed at private parties and Seattle venues such as Re-bar, the Baltic Room, Moore Theater and the Capitol Club. Cunneen continues to occasionally disc jockey at clubs and private events using the name "DJ Dan Steely".

== Graphic design ==
Cunneen was art director and designer for many of the commercial releases and promotional material for the bands he played in. In 2016, he founded the Seattle-based company ORANJ Custom Printing.

== Discography ==
with Final Warning

- 1983 Rain of Death cassette demo
- 1984 Final Warning (EP) Fatal Erection Records
- 1985 Drinking is Great (EP) (track on compilation: "I Quit") Fatal Erection Records
- 2007 PDX (CD) Southern Lord Records
- 2008 Final Warning EP (reissue) Black Water Records
- 2015 Demonstration 1983 (7-inch EP) Black Water Records

with Lew Jones

- 1994 Lew Jones Anthology 1978–1994: Take Me to the Future (CD) (played drums on several tracks) New Weave Records

with Obituaries

- 1988 Obituaries (EP) Highgate Records
- 2007 The Obituaries (anthology CD) (played drums on several tracks) Highgate Records

with Zipgun

- 1991 Together Dumb/Cool in the Cell (single) Empty Records
- 1991 Ten (one sided promo single) Empty Records
- 1992 8 Track Player (CD/LP) Empty Records
- 1992 The End/Nothing Cures (single) Musical Tragedies
- 1993 Put Me Away (split single w/ Derelicts) Rekkids
- 1993 Baltimore (CD/LP) Empty Records
- 1994 I Can't Wait/Tight Black Pants (single) Thrill Jockey Records

with Nightcaps

- 1995 Gambler's Game/For Me (single) Rendezvous Recordings
- 1995 I Don't Like You/Love You More (single) Sup Pop
- 1996 Split (CD) Rendezvous Recordings/Sub Pop
- 1998 You Lied/Last of the Secret Agents (single) Estrus Records
- 2000 Get On (CD) Rendezvous Recordings
- 2002 Spin Out 3 (compilation CD track: "Love You More") V2 Records (Japan)
- 2003 I Don't Like You (CD) User Records (Japan)
- 2011 In the Live Room (+ the singles) (CD) Rendezvous Recordings

Dan Cunneen

- 2011 The Answer b/w Shoot & Share (single) Rendezvous Recordings

Dan Steely

- 2020 Showdown b/w Showdown (DJ Yot Roc Mix) (vinyl/digital single) ORANJ Recordings

Roxbury Saints

- 2026 Let Him Know, Girl b/w Don't You Pity Me (digital single) ORANJ Recordings
