= Orkestar RTW =

Orkestar RTW is a five-piece band based in Seattle, Washington that started in 1987 as the house band for the Radost Folk Ensemble. Named in the tradition of post-World War II Balkan radio and television house bands (such as Orkestar Radio-Televizije Beograd), Orkestar RTW (Radio-Televizije Washington) plays the music of those bands, primarily traditional and folk music from the countries of Bulgaria, Macedonia, and Serbia.

Orkestar RTW appears on the Radost Folk Ensemble album Heirloom available from http://www.radost.org/RadostCD

== Members ==
- Ronald Long — accordion
- Teodora Dimitrova — tambura, vocals
- Jana Rickel — Bass, vocals
- Lizzy Pedersen — violin
- Tim McCormack — tapan, tarabuka

== Discography ==
- Heirloom (2001)
- Orkestar RTW (2020)
