= Pony Time (band) =

American garage rock band

- Origin: Seattle, Washington, United States
- Genres: Garage rock, punk rock
- Years active: 2009–2016, 2017, 2023
- Labels: Per Se Records, Dont Stop Believin' Records
- Members: Luke Beetham, Stacy Peck

Pony Time are an American two-piece garage rock band from Seattle, Washington, consisting of two members: Luke Beetham on bass/baritone guitar/vocals and Stacy Peck on drums. The band has been praised by such as CMJ and Spin.

== History ==
The two met helping a mutual friend move a stereo back in 2009, and started playing their unique brand of danceable punk music together soon after – eventually leading to several nationwide tours and three albums. Frontman Luke Beetham (also a guitarist in the British garage band Armitage Shanks) is locally renowned for his keen fashion sense, having been featured in the weekly Seattle newspaper the Stranger's "Men In Rock" guide. Drummer Stacy Peck (also a member in the alternative-rock band Childbirth) has also brought some notoriety to the group by directing most of the band's music videos, which have been featured in prominent publications such as Spin and Vice. Peck is also an out lesbian who has written about her experiences for Vice.

Pony Time has shared the stage with notable groups such as Rocket From The Crypt, Jenn Ghetto, Tacocat and The Thermals. The band was featured on episode 209 of the local television show, Band in Seattle.

On June 16, 2016, the band announced an indefinite hiatus on their Facebook page. However, they have since gotten together "one last time" for a show with Childbirth on July 21, 2017 and reunited for three shows in August 2023, two with Chastity Belt.

== Discography ==
- Pony Time Can Drink 100 Wine Coolers (Dont Stop Believin' Records, 2010)
- Pony Time (Per Se Records, 2011)
- Go Find Your Own (Per Se Records, 2013)
