= A Frames (band) =

American experimental rock band (1999–2010)

- Origin: Seattle, Washington, United States
- Genres: Post-punk, noise rock, garage punk, post-punk revival, experimental rock, art punk
- Years active: 1999–2010
- Labels: Sub Pop, S-S, Dragnet, Born Bad
- Past members: Erin Sullivan; Min Yee; Thomas Northcut; Lars Finberg

A Frames was an American experimental rock band formed in Seattle, Washington, in 1999. The trio consisted of Erin Sullivan, Min Yee and Lars Finberg. Finberg left the band in 2006 to focus on his other project, The Intelligence, and was replaced by Tommy Northcutt who remained with the band thereafter. The band was called Bend Sinister from 1996 to 1999. A Frames cites Cows, Scientists, Stick Men With Ray Guns, Scratch Acid, Joy Division, and 60's garage rock among its influences. A Frames started its own label, Dragnet Records, in January 2000 in order to release their music, and later the band signed with Sub Pop Records in 2004 for the release of Black Forest.

== Band members ==
- Erin Sullivan: vocalist, guitarist
- Min Yee: bassist
- Lars Finberg: drums (1999 - 2006)
- Thomas Northcut: drums (2006 - 2010)

== Musical style ==
A Frames sing about technology and apocalyptic cultural shifts, although many of the lyrics and themes are meant to be humorous. The band's style has also been described as experimental noise as the vocals are dark, monotone and bleak while the sound is aggressive. The drum beat is often mechanical and pounding, producing a raw, minimalistic sound. The sloppy, chaotic and sharp chords, however, are kept in line by the ever-steady rhythm.

== Discography ==
=== Singles ===
- "Neutron Bomb/Radiation Generation/Test Tube Baby" 7" (2000, Dragnet Records)
- "Plastica/Hospital" 7" (2001) (S-S Records)
- "Crutches/Membrane/Weissensee (Neu!)" 7" (2003, Royal Records)
- "Complications/Frankenstein" 7" (2004, S-S Records)
- "Police 1000/Traction" 7" (2006, S-S Records)

=== Albums ===
- A-Frames LP/CD (2002, S-S Records, Dragnet, re-issued on Born Bad Records, France in 2007)
- 2 LP/CD (2003, S-S Records, re-issued on Born Bad Records, France in 2007)
- Black Forest LP/CD (2005, Sub Pop Records)

=== Compilations appearances ===
- "Bumble Bee" on Babyhead LP, (S-S Records, 2004)
- "X.M.A.S." on Surprise Package CD (Flying Bomb Records)
- "I Wanna Hurt" on The Necessary Effect CD (Xeroid Records)
