= Nightcaps (Seattle band) =

American lounge band

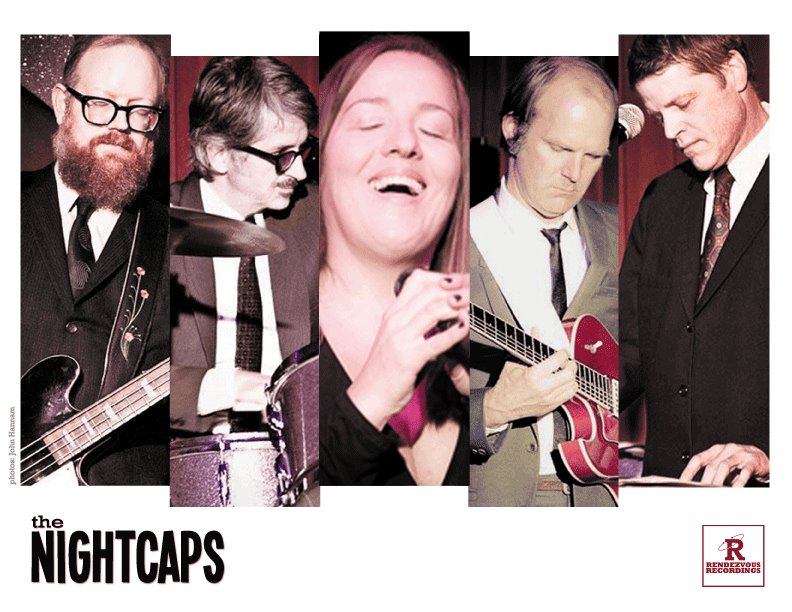
- Nightcaps in 2011. Left to right: William Herzog, Dan Cunneen, Theresa Hannam, Garth Brandenburg and Tor Midtskog.

Background information
- Origin: Seattle, Washington, U.S.
- Genres: Lounge, Pop, Jazz, Torch, Soul, Garage
- Years active: 1994–present
- Labels: Sub Pop, Rendezvous, Estrus, V2
- Members: Theresa Hannam; Dan Cunneen; Garth Brandenburg; William Herzog; Tor Midtskog

Nightcaps are an American lounge band from Seattle, Washington. The band was most active from 1995 through 2000, but they continue to play occasionally in the Pacific Northwest.

Nightcaps were an integral part of the mid-1990s lounge music resurgence that included bands such as Combustible Edison, Squirrel Nut Zippers and Love Jones. The Nightcaps were known as one of the few renascent lounge bands to avoid irony and kitsch.

In addition to the torch, jazz and lounge influences that typically characterized the genre's revival, Nightcaps also incorporated Wrecking Crew pop, Memphis soul and garage rock into their sound.

Seattle's Nightcaps released several singles, four full-length albums (including a best-of compilation released in Japan and a live CD of the band's performance on KEXP's "Live Room") and toured extensively throughout Western United States.

== History ==
Nightcaps were originally conceived and formed in 1994 by drummer Dan Cunneen (Final Warning, Obituaries, Zipgun), vocalist Theresa Hannam, guitarist Garth Brandenburg (The Crows, Moonspinners) and bassist William "Bill" Herzog (Citizens Utilities, Joel RL Phelps, Jesse Sykes). In 1995 Robert Fucci replaced Herzog on double bass and the band added John Broeckel (Death to Anders, Little Red Lung) on percussion.

The first Nightcaps single, Gambler's Game/For Me, was released in 1995 on the Nightcaps' label Rendezvous Recordings. (The Nightcaps released two other singles: I Don't Like You/Love You More on Sub Pop, in early 1996 and You Lied/Last of the Secret Agents on Estrus Records in 1998).

The Nightcaps' label Rendezvous Recordings entered into a manufacturing and distribution agreement with Sub Pop for their first album, Split, which was released in 1997. Split contained 12 original songs written by the songwriting team of Cunneen, Hannam and Brandenburg.

In 2000, the Nightcaps released their second CD, Get On, on Rendezvous Recordings. With darker lyrical themes than Split, the addition of keyboardist/guitarist Tor Midtskog and the return of Bill Herzog (now playing electric bass), the Nightcaps' music evolved from jazzy pop and swing to harder edged 1960s soul-rock.

In 2002, the B-side of their Sub Pop single, a re-working of the Buzzcocks tune "Love You More" appeared on a compilation by Japanese DJ Masanori Ikeda called Spinout 3, released in Japan by V2 Records.

In 2003, a "Best of" retrospective titled I Don't Like You, was released in Japan on the User Records label.

In September 2011, the Nightcaps albums Split and Get On were released online for the first time and a new Nightcaps album, In the Live Room (+ the Singles) was released by Rendezvous Recordings.

== Discography ==
- 1995: Gambler's Game/For Me (single) Rendezvous Recordings
- 1996: I Don't Like You/Love You More (single) Sup Pop
- 1997: Split (album) Rendezvous Recordings/Sub Pop
- 1998: You Lied/Last of the Secret Agents (single) Estrus Records
- 2000: Get On (album) Rendezvous Recordings
- 2002: Spin Out 3 (album) (track on compilation: "Love You More") V2 Records (Japan)
- 2003: I Don't Like You (album) User Records (Japan)
- 2011: In the Live Room (+ the Singles) (album) Rendezvous Recordings
