= The Turn-Ons =

The Turn-ons are an alternative rock band formed in 1997 in Seattle, Washington. Current members are Travis DeVries, Corey Gutch, Will Hallauer, and Erik Blood.

The Turn-ons have been performing in the Northwest, California and NY with bands like, Brian Jonestown Massacre, British Sea Power, and Ulrich Schnauss, and tirelessly writing and recording new material over the past 11 years. They caught the eye of REM's Peter Buck who described the band in his column for Q magazine, as "...simply my favourite new Seattle band. If I said that their sound was a combination of the Velvets, T. Rex and Spiritualized with a dash of Yo La Tengo, it wouldn't do them justice."

The Turn-ons have released three full-length albums, The Turn-ons, East, Parallels and the EP Love Ruined Us. Their songs have appeared on soundtracks, ASCAP and Uncut samplers, and featured in SPIN magazine.

On April 1, 2008, the Turn-ons released their 4th & 5th full-length albums, "Curse", and "The Darkest Light[out-takes, demos, & alternates]". Both albums are available for free to download from their web page, www.theturn-ons.com.

In 2009 Travis DeVries moved to NYC to start his new band, deVries with Sean Gibbons, Brian Brennan, Martin Glazier and Jeremy Sampson. In November they released their debut album "Death to God".

== Discography ==
- The Turn-ons, 2000
- Love Ruined Us (EP), 2002
- East, 2004
- Parallels, 2006
- Curse, 2008
- The Darkest Light [demos, out-takes, & alternates], 2008
