= The Divorce =

Rock band from Seattle, Washington

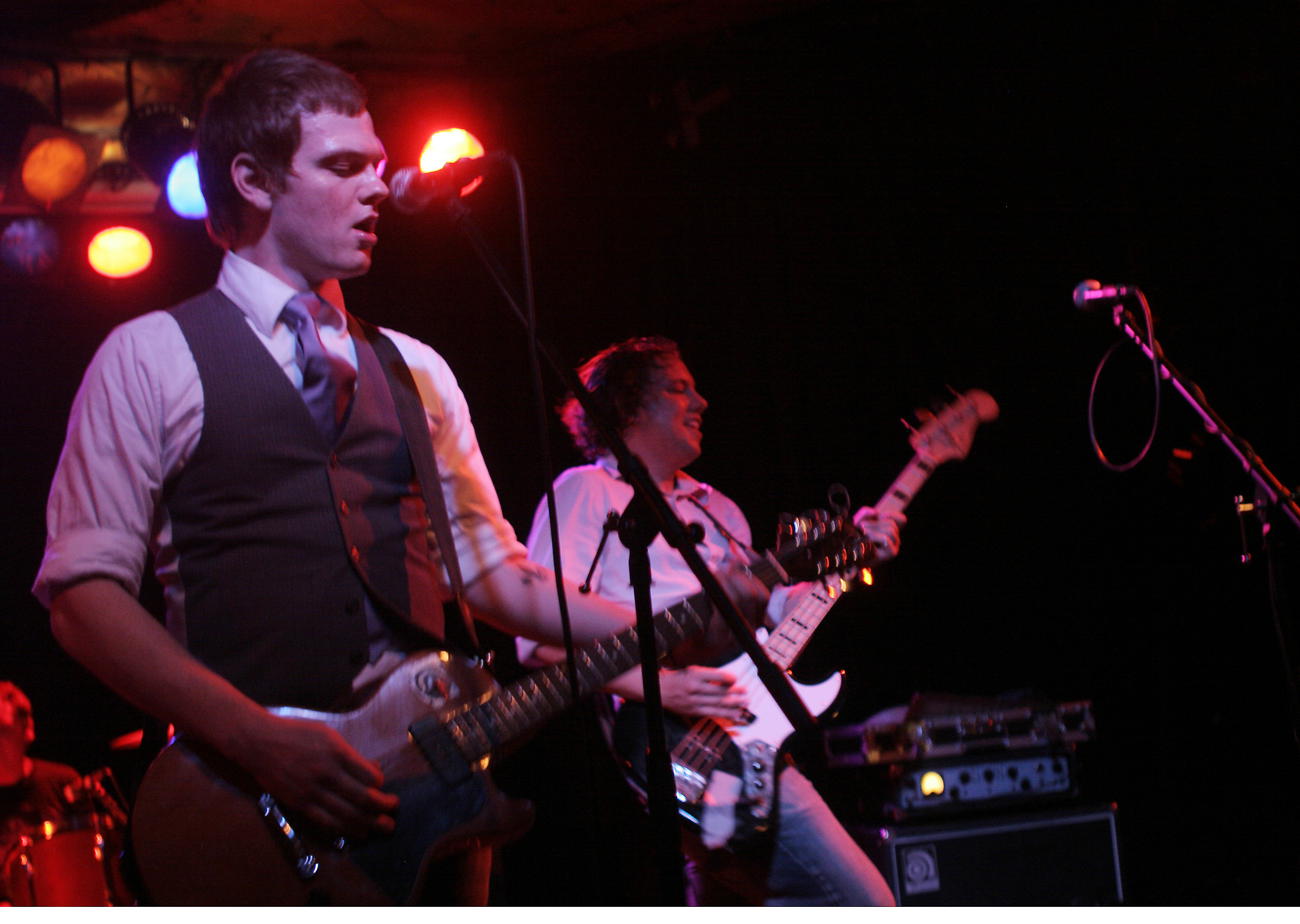
- The Divorce performing in Seattle in 2006

Background information
- Origin: Seattle, United States
- Genres: Indie rock
- Years active: 2002–2007; 2011
- Labels: Fugitive; Made in Mexico
- Members: Shane Berry; Kyle Risan; Jimmy Curran; Garrett Lunceford

The Divorce was a rock band from Seattle, Washington, originally composed of Shane Berry, lead vocals, keyboard, guitar and tambourine, (bass) and Kyle Risan, drums.

== History ==
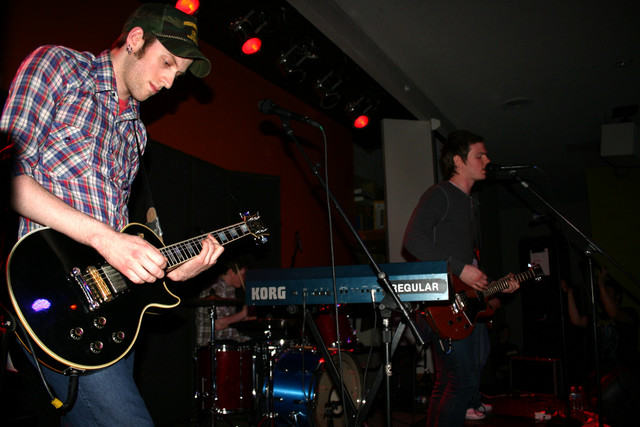

The band's first full-length release was There Will Be Blood Tonight on Fugitive Records in 2003. Prior to the release of its first album, however, the band released a self-titled EP featuring four songs, three of which were re-recorded for There Will Be Blood Tonight. The EP was also released in 2003 on Fugitive Records.

Prior to the release of There Will Be Blood Tonight, the band added Garrett Lunceford, formerly the drummer for Acceptance, on lead guitar.

In September 2005, The Divorce released its second full-length album, The Gifted Program, on Made In Mexico Records, a short-lived record label helmed by Damien Jurado.

The band recorded nine tracks for a planned third album, In Arms. Before releasing the album, however, the band broke up. The album was released to streaming services in 2019.

On June 30, 2007, The Divorce played its final show at the Crocodile Cafe in Seattle.

== Post breakup ==
After the band's dissolution, Garrett Lunceford played drums for a number of Seattle-based bands, including Wild Orchid Children, Kay Kay and His Weathered Underground (both of which feature members of Gatsbys American Dream and Forgive Durden), The Catch, The Raggedy Anns, and SHiPS. Lunceford also toured with Alaska-based band Portugal. The Man, temporarily replacing drummer Jason Sechrist for part of 2008 as well as playing drums on their 2009 release, The Satanic Satanist. In 2015, Lunceford rejoined Acceptance, playing drums, guitar, and keys, for the recording of Colliding By Design and the subsequent supporting tour.

On July 30, 2011, The Divorce briefly reformed to perform a reunion show at Seattle's Crocodile Cafe. On September 16, 2022, The Divorce played a second reunion show with Slender Means and Boyfrend at the Tractor Tavern in Ballard.

== Line-up ==
- Shane Berry – vocals, keyboard, guitar, tambourine
- Jimmy Curran – bass
- Garrett Lunceford – lead guitar
- Kyle Risan – drums

== Discography ==
- The Divorce EP (2003, Fugitive Records)
- There Will Be Blood Tonight (2003, Fugitive Records)
- The Gifted Program (2005, Made In Mexico Records)
- In Arms (incomplete) (2007, self-released in 2019)
