= The Beakers =

American art punk band

- Origin: Seattle, Washington, US
- Genres: Art punk, post-punk, new wave
- Years active: 1980–1981
- Labels: Mr. Brown, Engram Records
- Past members: Mark Haskell Smith; Jim Anderson; George Romansic; Frankie Sundsten

The Beakers were an art punk band from Seattle, Washington. Although the band only existed for twelve months, they were considered influential on the local underground music scene. The band include Mark H. Smith as a vocalist and guitarist, Jim Anderson as a saxophonist and vocalist, George Romansic as the drummer, and Frankie Sundsten as the bassist. The band broke up in January 1981.

== History ==
=== Formation ===
The Beakers had roots in the creative scene of Olympia, Washington,'s The Evergreen State College where singer and guitarist Mark Haskell Smith and drummer George Romansic first had met. Smith and Romansic joined with Seattle-based saxophone player/singer Jim Anderson, and the group played their first concert at the Bahamas nightclub in Seattle on January 25, 1980 together with fellow Seattle art punk pioneers The Blackouts and Chinas Comidas. When asked to play their next gig at the Showbox, a larger Seattle venue, the trio asked Francesca "Frankie" Sundsten, then the girlfriend of Blackouts singer and guitarist Erich Werner, to join the band as a bassist. During the following twelve months of their existence, the Beakers established themselves as an active live band, touring the west coast and sharing the stage with local groups such as The Fartz as well as opening for renowned post-punk acts like Gang of Four, The Delta 5 and XTC, garnering critical acclaim from said bands and music critics alike.

=== Musical style ===
The Beakers' musical style was defined by the combination of Smith's perpendicular guitar sounds and yelpy vocals, Sundsten's funk influenced bass lines and Anderson's dissonant saxophone while Romansic provided the rhythmic foundation, considered essential to the band's sound. Smith's vocals have been compared to "a hysterical David Byrne or an illiterate David Thomas" and D. Boon of the Minutemen. Other critics locate the band's music "somewhere between the nervy art rock of early Talking Heads and the broadly-defined hardcore aesthetic of the Minutemen" while AllMusic compares the Beakers to contemporaries Liquid Liquid, The Contortions and A Certain Ratio and sees the band as "spiritual forefathers to the Rapture, Erase Errata and other mid-2000s danceable rockers". Soundgarden guitarist Kim Thayil (who became a fan of the band in 1980 while still residing in Park Forest, Illinois) stressed the "quirky, herky-jerky, [...] chaotic, edgy element of new wave" that characterised the group's style. Writer Clark Humphrey also lauded the band for being "the first area band with a non-singing female musician".

The Beakers released a 7" single on the independent Mr. Brown record label (an offshoot of the Lost Music Network, more known for OP Magazine), containing the two songs "Red Towel" and "Football Season is in Full Swing" and featuring an altered version of Pablo Picasso's classic painting Guernica on the cover which was designed by Joellyn Rock. The single received a positive review by NME, praising the "push-pull rhythms [and] stuttering horns, laced and livened with farcical tootings, clever asides and nonsense ravings" in "Red Towel". During the band's brief existence, only two more Beakers songs were released, among them a cover version of the hit disco song "Funkytown" by Lipps Inc. A number of songs also emerged post-breakup on other compilations like Seattle Syndrome Volume One or Sub Pop 5, both released in 1981. One of the band's last performances took place on January 15, 1981, opening for Captain Beefheart on band founder Don Van Vliet's 40th birthday.

=== Post breakup ===
After the Beakers broke up in January 1981, the former members would continue to work together in other musical groups like 3 Swimmers (where Smith and Romansic would reunite) and Little Bears from Bangkok (with Anderson on lead vocals and Romansic on drums). Bassist Frankie Sundsten, who died in 2019, would venture into a career as a painter and later marry drummer Bill Rieflin (of The Blackouts, Ministry and others). George Romansic, who died in early 2015, was also essential in the process of building up a functioning distribution network in the northwestern independent music scene.

In 2004, K Records released the CD compilation Four Steps Toward a Cultural Revolution (named after a Beakers song) whose seventeen tracks encompassed virtually every song ever recorded by the band. The liner notes featured statements by Scott McCaughey (of The Young Fresh Fellows and R.E.M.), Jon King (of Gang of Four), Roz Allen (of Delta 5), and Kim Thayil of Soundgarden among others, all praising the band's originality and creativity in the then still punk-hostile music scene of Seattle in the early 1980s. Jon King in particular referred to the Beakers as having "talent by the truckload" as well as crediting them for being "key movers in developing the alt West coast artpunk sound".

== Members ==
- Mark H. Smith – vocals, guitar
- Jim Anderson – saxophone, vocals
- George Romansic – drums (died 2015)
- Frankie Sundsten – bass (died 2019)

== Discography ==
- Red Towel b/w Football Season Is in Full Swing (7" single, Mr. Brown, 1980)
- Life Elsewhere (12" split with John Foster and Steve Fisk, Mr. Brown, 1980)
- Four Steps Toward a Cultural Revolution (CD compilation, K Records, 2004)

== Compilation submissions ==
- 4 Steps Toward a Cultural Revolution on Seattle Syndrome Volume One (Engram Records, 1981)
- What's Important on Sub Pop 5 (Sub Pop cassette, 1981)
- Funkytown, 4 Steps Toward a Cultural Revolution, Bones, and 3 Important Domestic Inventions on Absolute Elsewhere (Mr. Brown, 1982)
