= Chinas Comidas =

American art punk band

- Origin: Seattle, Washington
- Genres: Art punk, post-punk, no wave
- Years active: 1977–1980
- Labels: Exquisite Corpse Records, Go Baby
- Past members: Cynthia Genser; Richard Riggins; Dag Midtskog; Mark Wheaton; Brock Wheaton; John Olufs; Pete Pendras; Jerry Anderson; Eldon Hoke

Chinas Comidas were an early art punk band from Seattle, Washington, that formed in 1977 and disbanded in 1980 after having moved to Los Angeles. The group combined no wave and proto-punk musical influences with frontwoman Cynthia Genser's feminist poetry.

== History ==
=== Formation in Seattle ===
New York City native and lyricist Cynthia Genser (née Kraman) had experienced the evolution of the early punk rock scene with bands like the Ramones, Patti Smith and Television. When Genser relocated to Seattle in the mid-1970s she connected with the city's blooming punk rock underground to recruit musicians for her own project Chinas Comidas (itself a Mexican slang expression meaning "Chinese food"). The first line-up consisted of members of fellow Seattle art-punk groups Red Dress and The Tupperwares, including drummer Eldon "El Duce" Hoke (who would soon leave Chinas Comidas to focus on his own shock rock outfit the Mentors). By 1978, a stable line-up consisting of Genser, Red Dress guitarist Richard Riggins, bassist Dag Midtskog, keyboard player Mark Wheaton and his brother Brock Wheaton on drums had been established. Chinas Comidas performances were highly influenced by Patti Smith and alternated between the band playing the Clash and Television influenced songs and Genser's recitals of radical feminist and highly political poetry. This concept often provoked resistance from the more traditional punk rock crowd, and staged violence would often occur during shows, even including brawls with members of other punk rock groups. The band shared the stage with other early Seattle underground acts like the Telepaths (and their follow-up band The Blackouts), the Tupperwares (who were later renamed to The Screamers and moved to San Francisco), the Beakers, and the aforementioned Red Dress. Touring bands for which Chinas Comidas played as the opening act included D.O.A., Black Flag and Ultravox. In addition to band shows, Genser also did solo poetry readings and shared the stage with fellow Seattle beat poet Steven Jesse Bernstein.

=== Relocation to Los Angeles ===
In 1978, Chinas Comidas released their first EP entitled Peasant/Slave on their own label Exquisite Corpse Records. The record helped garner attention to the band and was followed by the 7-inch single Snaps (Portrait of a Fan) the following year. Like other ambitious Seattle bands (including among others the Blackouts and the Tupperwares), Chinas Comidas were frustrated by the limited potential of the city's late seventies independent music scene. After planning to open for the Dead Kennedys on selected dates (only one of which, in Philadelphia, actually took place) the group decided to relocate to Los Angeles. The Chinas Comidas singles had received very positive reviews in the L.A.-based Slash punk rock fanzine, and the editor had invited the band to come there and possibly help getting more songs recorded. Chinas Comidas played venues like the Whisky a Go Go and shared bills with Fear, Germs, Redd Kross and other classic West Coast punk rock and hardcore punk groups. The band was well received by music critics as well as fellow musicians such as Sonic Youth's Thurston Moore who stated: "Chinas Comidas were the real deal. Exciting, intriguing and intoxicating". However, no record contract could be secured - a tentative signing to Slash Records reportedly didn't come to fruition as the label had just signed The Go-Go's and didn't have enough capacity to promote both bands - and in 1980 Chinas Comidas disbanded.

=== Post-breakup ===
After Chinas Comidas broke up, Genser and Riggins returned to New York and Seattle respectively while the remaining band members stayed in Los Angeles, collaborating among others with fellow Seattle expatriate Johanna Went. Genser also continued to publish poetry and was associate professor of English in the Honors Program at The College of New Rochelle, New York.

In 2007, a one-off reunion of Chinas Comidas in Seattle was scheduled for the release of the CD anthology "Chinas Comidas", a collection of the band's released songs as well as unreleased material. Due to a death in her family, Genser was unable to attend the show, however, Riggins and Midtskog performed at the event. In June 2014, Genser and Riggins performed Chinas Comidas songs as a part of an exhibition entitled When Punk was Punk 1977 which also featured posters, recordings and other memorabilia from the band's history. In July 2016, Riggins and Genser performed a set of Chinas Comidas songs at Fantagraphics Comics and Books as part of their "Hot off the Press" event coinciding with the Georgetown Art Attack. In 2018, Spanish record label Take the City Records released the "Chinas Comidas" CD compilation on 12-inch vinyl; Riggins and Genser have also recorded new songs and are planning to play dates in Europe to support the vinyl release.

=== See also ===
- Music of Seattle
- Seattle Syndrome Volume One

== Former members ==
- Cynthia Genser: vocals
- Richard Riggins: guitar
- Dag Midtskog: bass (1977–1980)
- Mark Wheaton: keyboards (1978–1980)
- Brock Wheaton: drums (1977–1980)
- John Olufs: guitar (1977)
- Pete Pendras: guitar (1977)
- Jerry Anderson: bass (1977)
- Eldon Hoke: drums (1977)

== Discography ==
- Peasant/Slave (7-inch EP, Exquisite Corpse Records, 1978)
- Snaps (Portrait of a Fan) (7-inch, Exquisite Corpse, 1979)
- Chinas Comidas (CD anthology, Go Baby, 2007)
- Chinas Comidas (12-inch, Take the City Records, 2018)
