= Seattle Syndrome Volume One =

Compilation album by Various artists
- Released: November 1981
- Recorded: 1980–1981
- Genres: New wave, post-punk, punk rock, hardcore punk, electronica
- Length: 42 min
- Label: Engram Records
- Producer: Neil Hubbard

Seattle Syndrome Volume One is a compilation of Seattle-based bands and artists released on vinyl and cassette in late 1981 on Engram Records. Produced by local promoter Neil Hubbard, supervised by former Telepaths guitarist Homer Spence, Danny Eskenazi (who also bankrolled the project), and recorded and engineered by Jack Weaver, the compilation features many of the well-known bands of the late seventies and early eighties music scene of Seattle, as well as including bands from Washington state. Stylistically, the contributions encompass a variety of music genres, ranging from hardcore punk to post punk and new wave as well as covering experimental electronica, psychedelic rock and rockabilly.

== The bands ==
Among the fifteen bands and artists contributing to the record are the regionally successful X-15 and The Pudz with their respective tracks Vaporized and Take Me to Your (Leader) as well as post punk acts such as The Blackouts and The Beakers who were considered very influential on certain bands of the later grunge scene such as The U-Men, Soundgarden or The Young Fresh Fellows. Hardcore punk bands The Fartz (who would later evolve into Ten Minute Warning, also of considerable influence on the following generation of Seattle underground rock bands) and The Refuzors contribute songs as well as long-lasting pop punks, The Fastbacks (then with a teenaged Duff McKagan on drums who would later join the Fartz and then be a formative member of Guns N' Roses). Jim Basnight of punk pioneers The Meyce and later of power poppers The Moberlys is featured with his solo song We'll Always Be in Love. Finally, electronic and avant garde projects like Savant, Danny Eskenazi's own K7SS or Audio Leter side project Body Falling Downstairs were also included to present a comprehensive picture of the Seattle underground music scene. On the other hand, popular and also commercially successful Seattle power pop bands like The Heats or The Cowboys had been consciously omitted from the record because, according to Neil Hubbard as quoted by Stephen Tow, "[they] were not a part of the creative scene that later blossomed into the grunge scene."

== Title and cover art ==
The title "Seattle Syndrome" refers to the predicament Seattle based bands found themselves in during the late seventies and early eighties, described by Neil Hubbard as the fact that "a Seattle band could produce stunning renditions of highly original tunes, to little or no support. You could do anything here, good or bad, and nobody would care." However, due to the then underdeveloped touring and promotion circuit for underground music, almost all of the bands who left Seattle for other cities – such as the Blackouts (who relocated to Boston, with some of their members later joining Ministry), art-punks Chinas Comidas (Los Angeles) or glam punk band The Fags (New York City) – only found little success abroad and split up shortly afterwards.

The album's cover art contains a picture by Mark Strathy, who was a Professor of Art at Central Connecticut State University in New Britain, Connecticut. Mark donated the artwork to Seattle's EMP Museum's permanent collection in April, 2015.

== Reception and legacy ==
Music journalist Clark Humphrey describes "Seattle Syndrome" both as "the first definitive document of the Seattle new-music scene" and "a souvenir of a time that was already moving on", since eight of the fifteen bands represented on the record had already disbanded by the time of its release.

Music historian Stephen Tow regards the first volume of "Seattle Syndrome" as "a critical yardstick in the history of underground Seattle music", ranking in with other influential compilations like "Deep Six" (released in 1986 on C/Z Records) or "Sub Pop 200" (released in 1988 on Sub Pop Records). In fact, "Deep Six" producer and C/Z founder Chris Hanzsek, then living in Boston, is reported to have been inspired by the "Syndrome" compilation to move to Seattle, start his own record label and, ultimately, release his own compilation of the burgeoning Seattle music scene.

Mark Baumgarten calls the record "a definitive compilation of songs documenting the city's punk and new wave scenes that was highly influential to the bands that went on to form the nucleus of the grunge movement".

== Sequel ==
A sequel to "Seattle Syndrome Volume One" followed in 1982 entitled "Seattle Syndrome Two", once again presenting underground bands and artists from Seattle.

== Track listing ==
Side A

1. "Vaporized" - X-15
2. "Take Me to Your (Leader)" - The Pudz
3. "Discover Your Feet" - Student Nurse
4. "Four Steps Toward a Cultural Revolution" - The Beakers
5. "We'll Always Be in Love" - Jim Basnight
6. "Someone Else's Room" - The Fastbacks
7. "White Power" - The Refuzors
8. "Campaign Speech" - The Fartz
9. "Party 88" - The 88's

Side B

1. "Young Man" - The Blackouts
2. "I'm 37" - The Macs
3. "Love Is a Tractor" - Philippo Scrooge
4. "Stationary Dance" - Savant
5. "The Politics of Ecstasy" - Body Falling Downstairs
6. "21.252" - K7SS
