= Francesca Sundsten =

American painter (1960–2019)

- Born: 1960; Hemet, California, U.S.
- Died: March 9, 2019 (aged 58–59); Seattle, Washington, U.S.
- Known for: Painting
- Spouse: Bill Rieflin (until 2019; her death)

Francesca Sundsten (1960 – March 9, 2019) was an American painter. She applied traditional techniques while exploring elements of composition, palette, and minor abstractions of space and paint to create paintings and illustrations which were described by The Seattle Times as "calling to mind the Old Masters" with a "distinctly surrealist sensibility."

== Life and career ==
Born in Hemet, California, Sundsten's family moved to the Seattle area when she was three. She began painting seriously in her early 20s, and enrolled at the San Francisco Art Institute in 1984. Sundsten's interest was in representational painting, a style which was discouraged in her undergraduate program, and after seeing an Odd Nerdrum exhibit at the San Francisco Museum of Modern Art, she traveled to Oslo to study with him. She returned to the Art Institute following her informal internship, where she spent the following two years "defending the unpopular direction", and was awarded a Bachelor of Arts degree in 1987. In 1990, she received a Master of Fine Arts degree from Stanford University.

Sundsten had solo exhibitions at the Grover/Thurston Galleries, Davidson Galleries, Linda Warren Gallery, Diane Nelson Fine Art, Olga Dollar Gallery, and Parker/Zinc Gallery, Hall Spassov Gallery and her work is in the permanent collections of the Tacoma Art Museum, Microsoft, and the University of Washington Medical Center. In a review of Sundsten's 2003 exhibit of drawings and paintings at the Davidson Galleries, the Seattle Post-Intelligencer wrote that "Sundsten's fine painting and mastery of realism hides nothing in haze. Her quirky, starkly confrontational imagery doesn't disturb as much as it questions. The characters hang in confused naivete, pondering, 'How did I get here?'" Of her 2013 exhibit Creatures at the Grover/Thurston Galleries, art critic Michael Upchurch wrote: "Throughout "Creatures", Sundsten's dazzling painterly facility makes her fantastical subjects feel preposterously plausible."

Sundsten taught at Stanford University, the Pratt Institute, and Cornish College of the Arts.

Sundsten, who played bass for the art-punk Seattle band The Beakers, was married to King Crimson drummer Bill Rieflin.

On August 7, 2019, it was announced that Sundsten had died from complications of lymphoma. Toyah Willcox, in announcing the death of Bill Rieflin one year later, confirmed that the date of her death had been March 9, 2019.
