= Mark Haskell Smith =

American writer (born 1957)

- Born: June 14, 1957 (age 69); Lawrence, Kansas, U.S.
- Education: Evergreen State College (BA); AFI Conservatory (MFA)
- Occupation: Writer
- Writing career
- Genre: Non-fiction
- Website: www.markhaskellsmith.com

Mark Haskell Smith (born June 14, 1957) is an American writer who lives in Los Angeles. He is best known for his books, the non-fiction Rude Talk in Athens: Ancient Rivals, the Birth of Comedy, and a Writers Journey through Greece published by Unnamed Press; Naked at Lunch: A Reluctant Nudist's Adventures in the Clothing-Optional World, published by Grove Press and Heart of Dankness: Underground Botanists, Outlaw Farmers and the Race for the Cannabis Cup, published by Broadway Books, as well as the novels: Moist, Delicious, Salty, Baked, Raw: A Love Story, and Blown published by Grove Atlantic/Black Cat.

His seventh and eighth novels, Memoires and Pura Vida are published in France by éditions Gallmeister in 2024 and 2026 respectively.

He has also written screenplays for the Brazilian film A Partilha and Playing God as well as television shows The Magnificent Seven, Star Trek: Voyager, and Martial Law. He adapted his third novel, Salty, into a feature film directed by Simon West and starring Antonio Banderas. The adaptation, Gun Shy, was released on September 8, 2017.

== Early life ==
Smith was born in Lawrence, Kansas, and was raised in a suburb of Kansas City. Smith attended and received a B.A. from The Evergreen State College in 1979 and an MFA from the American Film Institute Conservatory in 1987. After his undergraduate work, Smith moved to Seattle, WA living in the Belltown neighborhood. He played guitar and "sang" in the art-punk band The Beakers (1979–80) and 3 Swimmers (1981–83).

Smith moved to Los Angeles in 1984 to attend the American Film Institute's Conservatory. He lived briefly in New York City (1987–89), attending classes at Playwright's Horizons theater lab.

== Writing career ==
Smith began working as a playwright in the 1990s. His first play The Cost of Doing Business was workshopped at Playwright's Horizons and Manhattan Theatre Club before premiering at The Met Theatre in Los Angeles in 1992. The play was met with mixed reviews. The Los Angeles Times said, "the kind of superficial, self-congratulatory puff that gives stage liberalism a bad name." However, Hollywood executives took notice and the play led to a career in screenwriting.

Smith spent the next decade working on films doing uncredited rewrites, most notably on Anaconda and Excess Baggage, both produced by Columbia Pictures. Frustrated by the way his original script Playing God turned out, Smith began writing novels. His first, Moist, was published in 2002 by St. Martin's Press and optioned by DreamWorks Pictures for a film with Dan Jinks and Bruce Cohen producing and Barry Sonnenfeld directing. Smith adapted the screenplay and the film is currently in development. Delicious was published in 2005 by the Atlantic Monthly Press, with Salty (2007), Baked (2010), Raw: A Love Story (2013), and Blown (2018) published by Grove Atlantic/Black Cat.

Smith's first non-fiction book, The Heart of Dankness (2012), explores the world of underground botanists, outlaw farmers, and renegade strain hunters who pursue excellence and diversity in producing world-class cannabis. His second, Naked at Lunch (2015), is an immersive journalistic account of the world of nudism. Rude Talk in Athens (2021) is a speculative biography of the 5th century BCE writer Ariphrades and his rival Aristophanes.

== Works ==
=== Novels ===
- Moist (St Martin's Press, 2003) ISBN 978-0312316204
- Delicious (Grove Press, 2006) ISBN 978-0802142481
- Salty (Black Cat, 2007) ISBN 978-0802170347
- Baked (Black Cat, 2010) ISBN 978-0802170767
- Raw: A Love Story (Black Cat, 2013) ISBN 978-0802122018
- Blown (Black Cat, 2018) ISBN 978-0802128140
- Memoires (Editions Gallmeister, 2024) ISBN 978-2-351-783269
- Pura Vida (Editions Gallmeister, 2026) ISBN 978-2351783863

=== Nonfiction ===
- Heart of Dankness: Underground Botanists, Outlaw Farmers, and the Race for the Cannabis Cup (Broadway Books, 2012) ISBN 978-0307720542
- Naked at Lunch: A Reluctant Nudist’s Adventures in the Clothing Optional World (Grove Press, 2015) ISBN 978-0802123510
- Rude Talk in Athens: Ancient Rivals, the Birth of Comedy, and a Writers Journey through Greece (Unnamed Press, 2021) ISBN 978-1951213343
