= The Accüsed =

American crossover thrash band

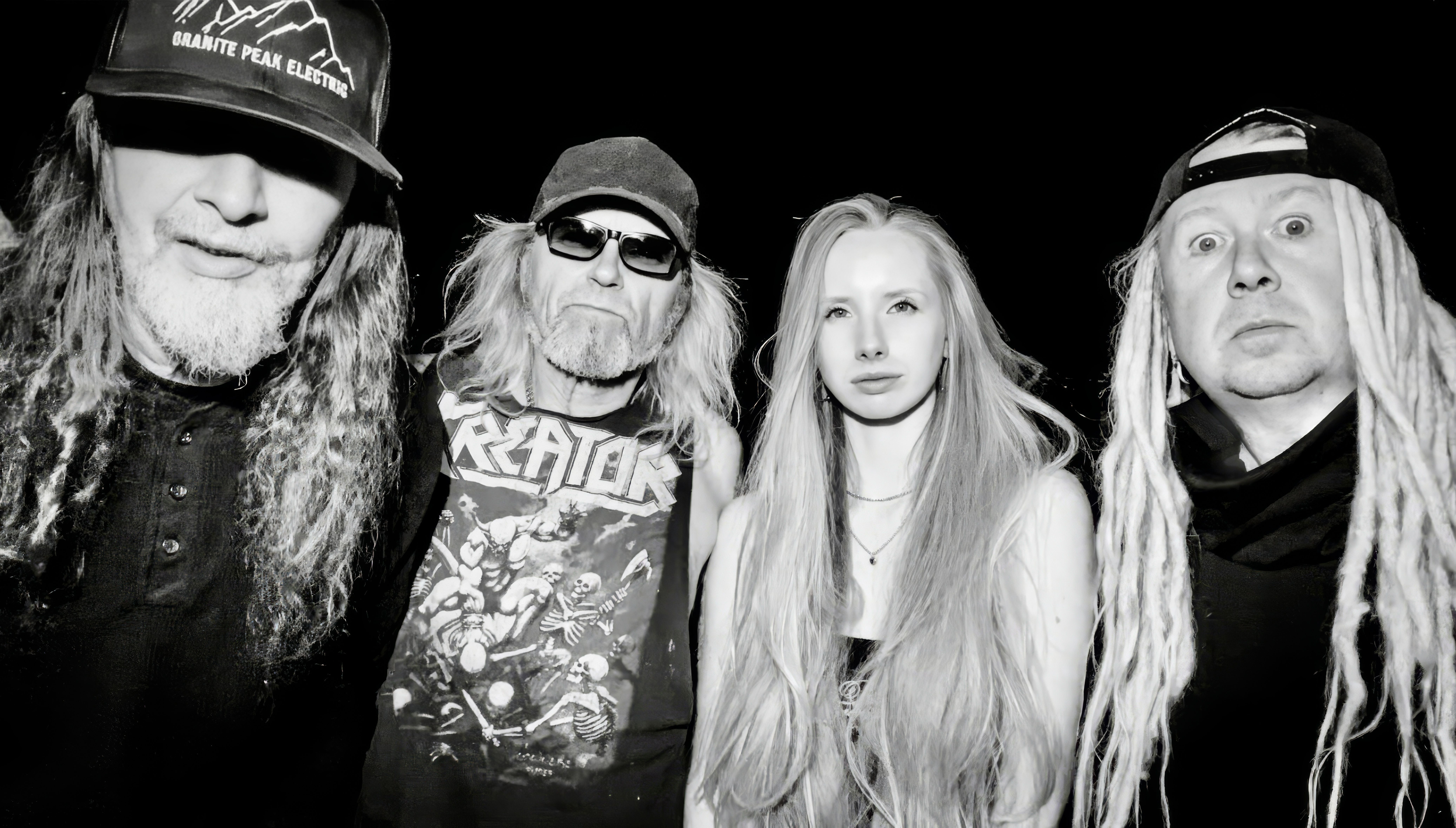
- The Accüsed in 2025

Background information
- Also known as: The ACCUSED™
- Origin: Seattle, Washington, U.S.
- Genres: Crossover thrash, hardcore punk
- Years active: 1981–1994, 2003–present
- Labels: Condar, Musical Tragedies, Southern Lord, Nastymix, Earache, Combat, Fatal Erection
- Members: Tommy Niemeyer; Josh Sinder; Brookelle Sinder; Brad Mowen
- Past members: Tracy Bohanis; Chibon Batterman; Dana Collins; Blaine Cook; John Dahlin; Mike Peterson; Alex Sibbald; Steve Nelson; Dorando Hodous; Brad Mowen; Nick Uttech; Devin Karakash; Warren A. Pease; Andrew Piro; Chris Napolitano; Stanley e Dunster; Aaron Slipp; Kevin Lee Cochneuer
- Website: visionmerch.com/the-accused

The Accüsed is an American crossover thrash band from Washington, formed in 1981 by Chibon 'Chewy' Batterman, Dana Collins and Tommy Niemeyer. The band was a progenitor of the crossover style that bridged the gap between thrashcore and thrash metal, later influencing grindcore and some crust punk bands; as well as an influential band in the Seattle area alternative scene. The band calls their music "splatter rock", and their zombie mascot, Martha Splatterhead, created by Blaine Cook and Tommy Niemeyer, appears on most of their albums. Common lyrical themes involve social injustice and Martha Splatterhead coming back from the dead to slaughter rapists and child molesters.

== History ==
=== Early years (1981–1992) ===
The Accüsed was formed in 1981 on Whidbey Island, by bassist Chibon "Chewy" Batterman, drummer Dana Collins, and guitarist Tommy Niemeyer. John Dahlin was the vocalist from 1982 to 1984. The original members formed as Gain Green, then chose the name The Accüsed, and then Political Nightmare, before returning to The Accüsed. The band's first two demo cassettes and their album, Please Pardon Our Noise, It Is the Sound of Freedom, released in 1983 drew heavily from hardcore punk. In 1984, the Fartz vocalist Blaine Cook replaced Dahlin.

In 1984, the band began adopting metal into their sound and dubbed their style "splatter rock", in 'homage' to their favorite genre of horror films. According to a review, "Their hybrid musical formula was distinguishable by Cook's unusual choking-sound vocals, Niemeyer's muted, choppy, buzz-saw guitars, dark metallic riffs, and Dana Collins rapid-fire, double-kick drumming." The band also created the zombie mascot, Martha Splatterhead (envisioned by Blaine Cook, visually-created by Tommy Niemeyer) "), whose likeness adorns most of their albums and many of their promotional items. A recurring theme in the band's lyrics involve Martha Splatterhead coming back from the dead to eviscerate and slaughter rapists and child molesters.

In 1983, The Accused teamed-up with fellow Seattle hardcore group REJECTORS, and Malcolm Conover's Fatal Erection Records for the band's debut vinyl title 'PLEASE PARDON OUR NOISE...It Is A Sound of Freedom'; a split-12-inch LP featuring 1 side for REJECTORS, 1 side for The Accused.

After a line-up change in late 1984, the band released a 5-song 12 inch EP, Martha Splatterhead, in 1985 on their own Condar label. Their first full-length LP was The Return of Martha Splatterhead, released on Subcore Records, and later re-released on Earache Records (the first mosh album), in 1986.

According to reviewer Jeb Branin, "I was writing for a zine in Canada called Northern Metal that reviewed the new LP The Return Of Martha Splatterhead giving it a 0.0 rating and absolutely crucifying it in the review. It is the only 0.0 review I remember ever seeing in Northern Metal. They hated it so much I knew I had to buy it. As I suspected, the album was a masterpiece of hardcore hysteria."

The LPs More Fun Than an Open Casket Funeral and Martha Splatterhead's Maddest Stories Ever Told quickly followed, as well a number of other annual releases. Starting with Hymns For the Deranged, the band also began working with Seattle producer Jack Endino, and their next album, Grinning Like an Undertaker, with Josh Sinder now on drums, was released on Nastymix Records followed by the EP "Straight Razor". 1993 The Accused began to see trouble brewing with their record label, Nastymix, as the label faced financial troubles, forcing the seminal rap label to dissolve its assets and be bought-up by the independent label, Ichiban. 'Splatter Rock' the Accused's final release under their Nastymix contract was released with little fanfare in 1993. The album featured production by Steve 'Thee Slayer Hippee' Hanford from Poison Idea.

From 1993-1994 the band played a handful of regional headline gigs, and appearances on the West Coast of the U.S. before dissolving. According to a review, "...live, The Accüsed were untouchable ... the whole band was a frenzy of epileptic gyrations, although Blaine's high flying leaps and bouncing off the walls like a deranged gnome were definitely the highlight ... even in today's underground you aren't going to find a more devastating band than The Accüsed."

The Accüsed took an 11-year hiatus in 1994, with members taking time to play in other Seattle bands, such as the Fartz and Gruntruck.

There is a large collection of archive videos of the Accüsed playing live, as well as a few interviews scattered on the internet.

=== Re-formation (2003–2010 and 2019–present) ===
The Accüsed re-formed in 2003, playing live shows in the Seattle area, and in 2005 released the album Oh, Martha! on the band's CONDAR label. This "comeback record" landed on Revolver magazine's Top Ten Albums of the Year and writer's lists from Metal Maniacs magazine. Oh, Martha! followed the tradition of many earlier releases by The Accüsed in that it featured a track with a guest lead singer. In this case, guitarist Tommy Niemeyer sang lead vocals on the angry "13 Letters" (though no lead vocal credit was printed on the album). In 2006 a limited-edition, split 7-inch with Whidbey Island, Washington's punk icons Potbelly was released. The Accüsed 2003 reunion line-up was short-lived, however, as a newly reformed version of the band surfaced in 2006, and yet another incarnation in Summer 2019. In 2022, guitarist Tommy Niemeyer and original vocalist, John Dahlin recruited March of Crimes bassist, Andy Caro; Brian Fritts (Big Top, The Black NAsty, 13 Scars) on guitar and former The Accused drummer, Josh Sinder (also Tad, Hot Rod Lunatics, et al.) . This line-up cranked out one song, 'Don't Swallow the Grime' then splintered, with Caro, Fritts and Dahlin departing between 2023 and 2024. Bass guitar duty then became the task for Brookelle Sinder, daughter of drummer Josh Sinder; and finally in early 2025 the return of vocalist Brad Mowen was implemented to round-out the current line-up for The Accüsed.

In an interview with Rock-A-Rolla, Tom Niemeyer stated that, during one of the band's many line-up changes, Mike Patton (of Mr. Bungle) was approached for the role of vocalist, with Patton ultimately declining Niemeyer's offer due to being "totally booked up". Patton did suggest Brad Mowen (ASVA, Burning Witch, Mommy, Master Musicians of Bukkake, et al.) who joined The Accüsed in 2006. The 'new' line-up released two new songs, via free download, "Scotty Came Back" and "Fuck Sorry", January 26, 2007.

In 2009, the band released their sixth full-length album, The Curse of Martha Splatterhead, via Southern Lord Records. The album's first pressing sold-out quickly and received widespread critical praise, forcing Southern Lord Records into a hasty 2nd-pressing of the CD title only weeks after its release. In 2010, the band was included as a part of the soundtrack for Namco Bandai Games' 2010 remake of Splatterhouse.

As of April 28, 2019, the Accüsed are, according to founding member and guitarist, Niemeyer, "...once again active; with new material slated to be released Summer 2019, as well as a vintage 1983 Live gig from Missoula, Montana coming out on P.I.G. Records in 2019..." Niemeyer stated The ACCUSED would also be performing live gigs in select markets accompanying both releases in the summer of 2019. After several line-up changes, the band "...have returned with new songs, and releases of older, vintage material–both due out Summer 2019; with select LIVE appearances to follow..." according to band founder and guitarist Tommy Niemeyer.

The current line-up of The Accused features original guitarist and founding member, Tommy Niemeyer as well as former drummer, Josh Sinder, from the band's Grinning Like An Undertaker and Straight Razor releases; Brad Mowen former vocalist ('The Curse of Martha Splatterhead' LP) and Josh's daughter Brookelle on bass guitar. In May 2026, The Accused released a music video for their song 'Interfectrix' and the group will tour Europe in September 2026 with additional live shows to be announced throughout 2026-2027.

== Impact ==
Despite being frequently cited as an influence by other punk and metal bands, The Accüsed has largely remained in the underground. According to Sputnikmusic, "It's a shame really [that] The Accüsed aren't recognized in the metal music industry as being one of the pioneering members of crossover thrash. These boys deserve more attention than they get."

== Members ==
Current members

- Tommy Niemeyer – guitar (1981–1993, 2003–present)
- Josh Sinder – drums (1990–1993, 2023–present)
- Brad Mowen – vocals (2005–2009, 2025–present)
- Brookelle Sinder – bass (2024–present)

Past members

- Chibon Batterman – bass (1981–1986)
- Dana Collins – drums (1981–1988)
- John Dahlin – vocals (1981–1984, 2023–2025)
- Blaine Cook – vocals (1984–1993, 2003–2005)
- Alex Sibbald – bass (1986–1993, 2003–2005)
- Steve Nelson – drums (1988–1990, 2003–2009)
- Iman A. Phid – bass (2005–2009)
- Mike Peterson – drums (2009–2010)
- Dorando Hobdus – bass (2009–2019)
- Kevin Cohchnneur – vocals (2009–2023)
- Andy Pease – drums (2010–2019)
- Diamond Vincent – bass (2019–2023)
- Nick Uttech – drums (2019–2023)
- Andy Caro – bass (2023–2024)

Timeline

== Discography ==
=== Albums ===
- 1981: Brain Damage 1 (demo cassette)
- 1982: Brain Damage 2 (demo cassette)
- 1983: Please Pardon Our Noise, It Is a Sound of Freedom aka Accüsed/Rejectors Split (Fatal Erection)
- 1985: Martha Splatterhead (EP, Condar)
- 1986: The Return of Martha Splatterhead (LP, Subcore and Earache Records)
- 1987: More Fun Than an Open Casket Funeral (LP, Combat Records)
- 1987: 38 Song Archives Tapes 1981-86 (200 cassettes self-released by The Accüsed)
- 1988: Martha Splatterhead's Maddest Stories Ever Told (LP, re-released in 1991 on Combat.)
- 1988: Hymns for the Deranged (LP, Empty Records)
- 1990: Grinning Like an Undertaker (LP, Sub Pop, Nastymix)
- 1991: Straight Razor (EP, Nastymix)
- 1992: Splatter Rock (LP, Nastymix)
- 2006: Oh Martha! + Baked Tapes (double LP, Nuclear Blast) – 666 pressed
- 2006: 34 Song Archives Tapes 1981-86 (Condar; #Cond002)
- 2007: Why Even Try? (EP, Condar 2007)
- 2009: The Curse of Martha Splatterhead (LP, Southern Lord)

=== Singles ===
- 1989: Accüsed/Morphius Split (split 7-inch single, Empty)
- 1992: Straight Razor (Fantagraphix Comics)
- 2002: Paint It Red
- 2005: Songs of Horror and Alcoholism (split 7-inch with Potbelly, PB Records)

=== Album track listings ===
Martha Splatterhead (1985)
No.	Title	Length
1.	"Distractions"
2.	"Martha Splatterhead"
3.	"Slow Death"
4.	"Take My Time"
5.	"Fuckin' for Bux"

The Return of Martha Splatterhead (1986)
No.	Title	Length
1.	"Martha Splatterhead"	2:16
2.	"Wrong Side of the Grave"	3:05
3.	"Take My Time"	2:04
4.	"Distractions"	2:03
5.	"Buried Alive"	1:24
6.	"Show No Mercy"	2:22
7.	"Slow Death"	2:14
8.	"Autopsy"	3:37
9.	"She's the Killer"	1:52
10.	"In a Death Bed"	1:10
11.	"Lonely Place"	2:23
12.	"Fuckin' 4 Bucks"	1:31
13.	"Martha's Revenge"	4:53

More Fun Than an Open Casket Funeral (1987 Combat)
No.	Title	Length
1.	"Halo of Flies"
2.	"W.C.A.L.T."
3.	"Rape (Not a Love Song)"
4.	"Lifeless Zone"
5.	"Scotty"
6.	"Devil Woman" (Cliff Richard cover)
7.	"Bethany Home"
8.	"Mechanized Death"
9.	"S.H.C."
10.	"Judgment Day"
11.	"Take No Prisoners"
12.	"Splatter Rock"
13.	"Septi-Child"
14.	"I'll Be Glad When You're Dead"

Martha Splatterhead's Maddest Stories Ever Told

1. "Psychomania"
2. "Bag Lady Song"
3. "Inherit the Earth"
4. "Deception"
5. "Molly's X-Mas"
6. "I'd Love to Change the World" (Ten Years After cover)
7. "You Only Die Once"
8. "Sick boy"
9. "Chicago"
10. "Starved to Death"
11. "War=Death"
12. "Maddest Story Ever Told"
13. "Intro"
14. "Scared of the Dark"
15. "Losing Your Mind"
16. "Smothered Her Trust"
17. "Lights Out"
18. "Hearse"

Hymns for the Deranged (1988 Combat)
No.	Title	Length
1.	"Grinning"
2.	"Brutality and Corruption"
3.	"Tapping the Vein"
4.	"Barracuda" (Heart cover)
5.	"Our Way" (live)
6.	"Cold Sweat" (Thin Lizzy cover) (rehearsal)
7.	"Highway Star" (Deep Purple cover) (live)
8.	"Symptoms of the Universe" (Black Sabbath cover) (rehearsal)

Grinning Like an Undertaker (1990 Nastymix) – produced by Jack Endino
No.	Title	Length
1.	"Pounding Nails (Into the Lid of Your Coffin)"	03:07
2.	"Bullet-Ridden Bodies"	02:44
3.	"The Corpse Walks"	03:41
4.	"Grinning (Like an Undertaker)"	01:50
5.	"Down and Out" (featuring the Mad Poet)	03:45
6.	"Cut & Dried"	01:42
7.	"Dropping Like Flies"	02:34
8.	"M Is for Martha"	02:50
9.	"Room 144" (instrumental)	02:59
10.	"When I Was a Child"	02:33
11.	"The Night"	02:29
12.	"Voices"	03:18
13.	"Boris the Spider" (The Who cover)	02:37
14.	"Tapping the Vein"	02:31

Straight Razor (1991 Nastymix) – produced by Jack Endino
No.	Title	Length
1.	"No Hope for Relief"
2.	"Close Insight"
3.	"The Corpse Walks"
4.	"Straight Razor"
5.	"Down and Out"
6.	"Saturday Nite Special"
7.	"Blind Hate / Blind Rage"
8.	"Voices"

Splatter Rock (1992 Nastymix) – produced by The Accüsed
No.	Title	Length
1.	"Two Hours Til Sunrise"	4:15
2.	"Stick In A Hole"	3:10
3.	"No Choice"	2:56
4.	"Lettin' Go"	3:56
5.	"Blind Hate/Blind Rage"	2:36
6.	"Greenwood House Of Medicine/Don't You Have A Woman"	2:14
7.	"She's Back"	3:19
8.	"Tearin' Me Apart"	4:21
9.	"Green Eyed Lady (Sugarloaf cover)"	2:54
10.	"Brutality And Corruption"	2:24
11.	"Living, Dying, Living/In A Zombie World"	5:56

== Catalog ==
The out-of-print back-catalog of The Accüsed's albums has been sporadically re-issued on various labels over recent years; a move prompted in part by the fact that many collectors of memorabilia by The Accüsed were seeing copies of the rare/out-of-print US-made CDs fetch hundreds of dollars each on the auction website eBay.
