= The Curse of Martha Splatterhead =

Studio album by The Accüsed
- Released: 2009
- Genre: Hardcore punk, crossover thrash
- Length: 29:56
- Label: Southern Lord Records

The Accüsed chronology
Why Even Try? (2007)	The Curse of Martha Splatterhead (2009)

The Curse of Martha Splatterhead is an LP by Oak Harbor, Washington crossover thrash band the Accüsed. It was released in 2009 with a reformed line-up on Southern Lord Records.

== Reception ==
According to Sputnikmusic, "The songs on the album are awesome, there really is no other way to put it. This album is nothing but fourteen songs of pure crossover thrash, stripped down so that you experience the full brutality of The Curse Of Martha Splatterhead. Each song is propelled along by Tommy Niemeyer’s riffs which go from thrash to hardcore to punk with ease and he even slips in the odd sloppy solo which works superbly in the context of these songs. Most songs are clearly thrash, although they have a punky sound to them as well. Niemeyer is backed up by Dorando Hodous on bass and Mike Peterson on drums, who just keep adding to this deadly combination. With a new vocalist as well, known only as Brad Mowen, his performance on the album is superb. He goes from yells, to rasps that all fit in perfectly with each song. The main lyrical theme of most songs include zombies, gore and society."

== Track listing ==
The Curse of Martha Splatterhead

1. The Splatterbeast – 2:38
2. Stomped to Death – 1:35
3. Bodies Are Rising – 2:01
4. Festival of Flesh – 2:39
5. Elijah Black – 2:09
6. Scotty Came Back – 1:37
7. Hemline – 2:34
8. Die Violently – 2:00
9. By the Hook – 1:36
10. Avenue of the Dead – 1:39
11. Fuck Sorry – 2:14
12. Martha's Disciples – 1:54
13. Seriously Dead – 1:39
14. Splatter Rock II – 3:35
