= X-15 (band) =

American rock band

- X-15 in front of the Gorilla Room in 1980. From left: Eric Rohrer, Eric Alton, Tod Fuhs, Kelly Mitchell, Ken Wooding

Background information
- Origin: Bellingham, Washington, United States
- Genres: Rock, Punk
- Years active: 1979–1987, 1995
- Labels: Panese Records, Engram Records, I.R.S. Records, Sub Pop Records, New Soul Records
- Past members: Kelly Mitchell; Eric Alton; Tim Lollar; Erik Rohrer; Todd Fuhs; Ken Broadfoot; Ted Askew

X-15 is an American rock band formed in Bellingham, Washington in 1979 by lead singer Kelly Mitchell, guitarist Eric Alton, bass player Tim Lollar, keyboardist Erik Rohrer, and drummer Todd Fuhs. They are best known as one of the most successful alternative bands operating out of Seattle during the years 1980 through 1987, leading up to the Seattle grunge explosion, and for their cult-classic song "Vaporized".

== History ==
X-15's rise to success began in 1980. Because of their unique sounding, original songs - dubbed "melodic punk" by rock critic Daina Darzin of Desperate Times and the New York Rocker - the band quickly became a sought-after alternative to cover bands by booking agents, club promoters and college entertainment directors throughout the Pacific Northwest and in Canada. Thus X-15 routinely played not only the most notable of NW area punk clubs, such as The Gorilla Room and The Smiling Buddha, but also cover-band havens such as Astor Park and "The Hall of Fame". The band's success at cracking the "cover-band" circuit was due in large by its perceived crossover potential. This perception was helped greatly by radio airplay. Soon X-15 was playing larger venues as headliners, and as openers for many of the larger acts of the day.

The band was one of the first to be offered a contract by Engram Records, in 1980, for a 5-song EP which featured X-15's best early material. This collection included "Necessary Evil", "Mad Again", "Chronic Modern Death", "Vaporized", and "Gimme Violation". In 1981 Engram released The Seattle Syndrome Volume 1 compilation, which featured X-15's signature hit "Vaporized" as the lead cut. This release broadened their exposure greatly, and shortly thereafter they became internationally recognized.

== Experience Music Project Exhibition ==
For the opening of Seattle's Experience Music Project museum, the members of X-15 were asked to include "Vaporized" in a collection of NW area band songs. This 47-song compilation, collected and produced in collaboration with Sub Pop records, became "Wild and Wooly" - and includes everything from The Wailers' hit, "Louie Louie", to The Sonics' "The Witch", to Nirvana's "Love Buzz", and Pearl Jam's "Even Flow". X-15 is now featured in a permanent exhibit in the Experience Music Project museum.

== Discography ==
- "Vaporized" on the Seattle Syndrome Volume One compilation, Engram Records, 1981
- "Life in General" (5-track, 12" EP), Panese Records, 1981
- "Life in General" (5-track, 12" EP), I.R.S. Records, 1983
- "Desperate Reminiscence" on the "Sounds of Young Seattle" compilation, D. Kulczyk 1983
- "Vaporized / Rebirth" (single), 1985
- "Top of the Hole" (CD), Horseantler Records, 1995
- "Vaporized" on the "Wild and Woolly" compilation, EMP / Sub Pop Records, 2000
- "Bombs and Insurance" (LP), New Soul Records, 2003

== Notes ==
- Desperate Times Vol. 1 No. 1, 8 July 1981, page 2, section entitled "Moving Violations."
- Music of Washington (state)
