= Solger =

American hardcore punk band

- Origin: Seattle, Washington, United States
- Genres: Hardcore punk
- Years active: 1980–1984
- Past members: Paul Dana, Kyle Nixon, Doug Rockness, Tor Midtskog

Solger was considered by many as the first American hardcore punk band in Seattle. The name Solger was a misspelling of Soldier, coming from their anti-draft song "Dead Soldier". Their five-song self-titled 7" record and its super lo-fi sound become a collector's item, as well as setting the standard for comparison by other lo-fi punk recordings worldwide.

== Background ==
Paul Dana (guitar), also known as Paul Solger, started the band after meeting Kyle Nixon (vocals) in May 1980. The rhythm section on the Solger EP was Doug Rockness on bass and Seattle based multi-instrumentalist Tor Midtskog (later of Seattle's Colour Twigs, Nightcaps and currently MoonSpinners) on drums.

After leaving Solger, Paul joined up with the Fartz. He then started The Fags with Upchuck, he played with Ten Minute Warning a few years later. In 1984, Paul Solger got back together with The Fags and the band moved to New York City. Paul Solger was an influence to both Stone Gossard of Pearl Jam and Steve Turner of Mudhoney. Paul Solger co-wrote "Rehab Doll" with Green River.

Doug Rockness (bass), started R.P.A. with former members of The Lewd and The Refuzors after Solger broke up - Rockness died in Thailand while on vacation in May 2006 from a suspected, but unconfirmed, drug overdose.

Paul Dana was diagnosed with cancer in 2004 but was successfully treated and still lives in the state of Washington. Kyle Nixon was diagnosed with multiple sclerosis in January 2001.

Duff McKagan has been known to use a white bass with "Solger" written in black marker across it, to show his support for his long-time friend Paul Solger, and his battle with cancer.

== Bibliography ==
- Blush, Stephen (2001). American Hardcore - A Tribal History. Los Angeles, CA: Feral House. p. 61. ISBN 0-922915-71-7.
- Humphrey, Clark (1995). LOSER - The Real Seattle Music Story. Portland, OR: Feral House. p. 49. ISBN 0-922915-27-X.
- Bush, James (1999). Encyclopedia of Northwest Music. Seattle, WA: Sasquatch Books. p. 43. ISBN 1-57061-141-6.
