= The Squirrels =

American band

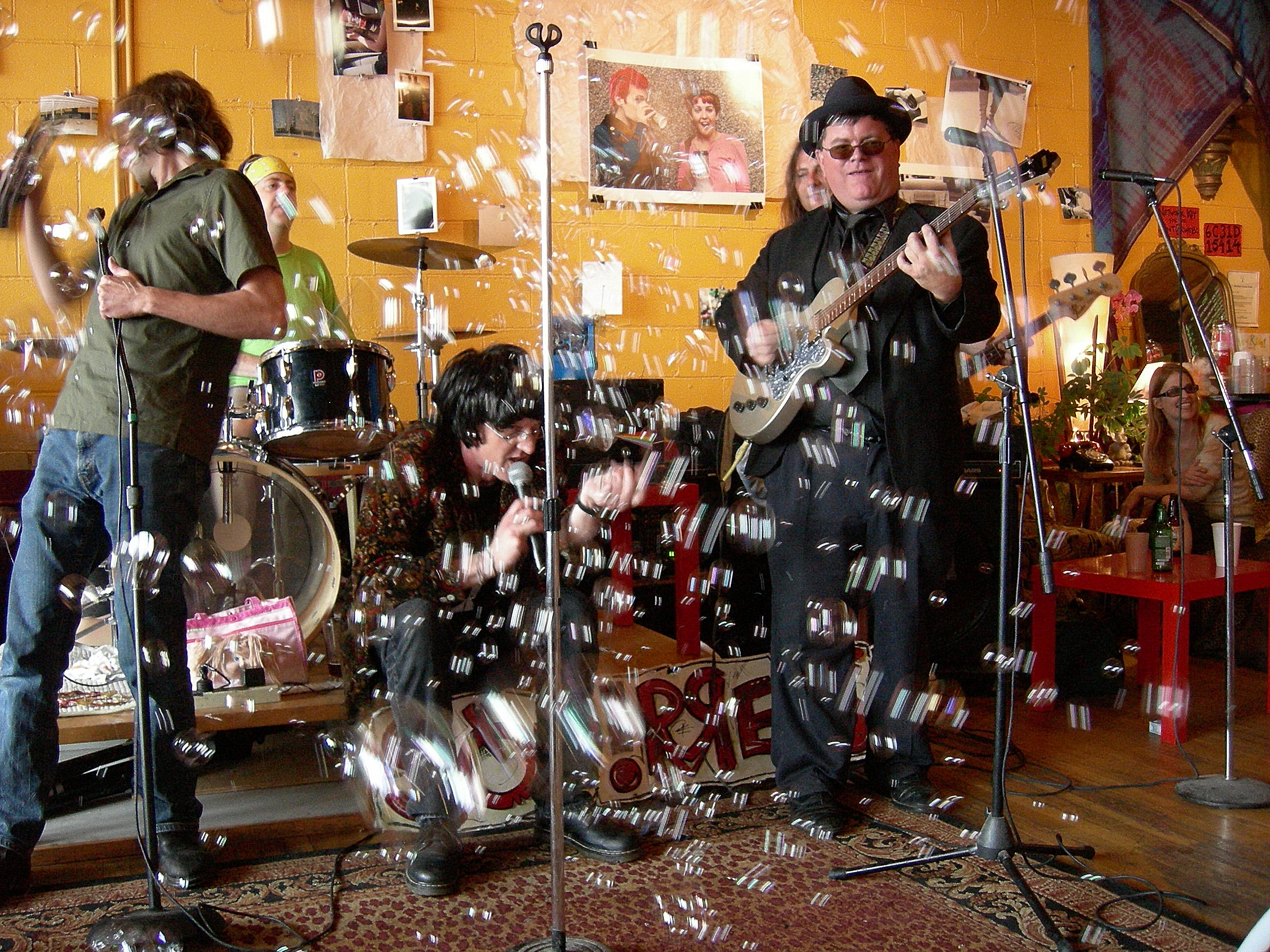
- The Squirrels performing at Mr. Spot's Chai House in 2006

Background information
- Also known as: Ernest Anyway and the Mighty, Mighty Squirrels; New Age Urban Squirrels; Squirrels Group '87; Ron Voyage and the New Squirrels; Squirrels Live Unit; Crosby, Squirrels, and Nate
- Origin: Seattle, Washington, United States
- Genres: Alternative
- Years active: 1984–2009, 2017-
- Label: PopLlama Records
- Members: (2017 lineup); Rob Morgan; Joey Kline; Jimmy "J. T." Thomas; Bruce Laven; Keith Lowe; Bill Ray (Final 2010 lineup); Rob Morgan; Joey Kline; Hollis The Bug (aka John Fleischman); Matt Fox; Aaron "A.T." Taylor; Rusty Urie
- Past members: Scott McCaughey, Tad Hutchison, Jimbo Sangster, Chuck Carroll, Kurt Bloch, John Ramberg, Bill Larsen, Crispi, Riki, Eric Erickson, Craig Ferguson, Mark Nichols, Kevin Crosby, Jon Nay, Nate Johnson, Tom Vail, Mick Vee, Charles Wheeler, Jon Auer, Ken Stringfellow, Dave "Gimpy" Guinn, Andy Davenhall, J. Stotler, T.J. Hanify, Mark Hoyt, Mary K, Mike Musburger, Don Pawlak, Baby Cheevers, Cookie, Tom Morrison
- Website: www.thesquirrels.com

The Squirrels are a novelty pop band based in Seattle, Washington. Founded in 1984 by lead vocalist Rob Morgan (founder, as well, of the Poplust zine), the band went through numerous lineups, but has stuck to the aesthetic that Peter Blecha describes as "cross-pollinat[ing] bubblegum sensibilities with punk attitudes."

Although most of the Squirrels material has been, technically speaking, cover versions, they are by no means a typical cover band. They have a theatrical stage sense derived from Alice Cooper and The Tubes (for a while in the mid-1990s, their stage paraphernalia included a working guillotine), and an approach to arrangements that Morgan has described as "... the Frankenstein method of song arrangement... 'Well, we like these verses, but the chorus on that song is way better. So we'll just graft it right on there, make a whole new beast.' We just start fooling around, and then we go 'Hey, this Alice Cooper song fits right on there, and to hell with the chorus. Let's put the chorus of "Runaway" by Del Shannon in there because it's better!'"

In late 2008, the Squirrels announced a year ahead of time that they would be breaking up the band and referred to their last year's gigs as the "Death With Dignity Tour"; their last show in that era was the December 12, 2009 20th Annual XXXmas show. The band returned to the stage in 2017.

== History ==
"Take me to your (leader)" b/w "Take a letter Maria"

Rob Morgan arrived in Seattle in 1977 from Edmonds, Washington, and lived initially in the same University District party house that spawned The U-Men and The Look. His first band, The Fishsticks (1979), was a rather chaotic and amateurish affair, but its successor, The Pudz (1980–1982), became a Seattle legend: in an exhibit at the Experience Music Project, Mark Arm narrates the story of The Pudz warming up at Seattle's Showbox for a gig by UK punk band 999. As The Pudz played their set, performing the likes of The Ohio Express' "Yummy, Yummy, Yummy" and the R. B. Greaves hit "Take a Letter, Maria", a group of people in front of the stage jeered and pelted them. Arm's version of the story suggests a large group of hecklers, but according to Morgan it was "a small group... trying desperately to out 'punk rock' each other, while the rest of the audience... smart enough to realize that punk was much more of a mindset than a hairstyle & a jacket... looked on in befuddled amusement—"

The Pudz' sole single—a Dave Locksley original called "Take Me To Your, (Leader)" b/w "Take A Letter Maria"— was as close to a "hit" as one could have in the DIY era, receiving airplay on college radio up and down the West Coast. The single sold out quickly and was later incorporated into The Squirrels' CD Scrapin' For Hits. In 2000, "Leader" was included in an Experience Music Project 2-CD retrospective of Northwest Rock, which also featured more famous groups like The Sonics, Paul Revere & The Raiders, Heart and Pearl Jam.

The Pudz broke up when lead guitarist Dave Locksley left town; Rob briefly put together a band called The Pamona Boners, then in 1984 he managed to draft the Young Fresh Fellows (YFF) to back him under the name Ernest Anyway and the Mighty, Mighty Squirrels, seen in retrospect as the first Squirrels lineup.

The Squirrels' Five Virgins, 1986. The cover referenced the John Lennon/Yoko Ono Two Virgins cover.

This proved to be only a temporary expedient: most of the Fellows chose to concentrate on their own band, leaving Rob & YFF drummer Tad Hutchison to put together a new lineup that they christened New Age Urban Squirrels. This lineup, featuring Rob's high school buddy and fellow Fishstick Eric Erickson on guitar, really began to develop the band's cut-and-paste method of arranging, welding songs on top of songs live onstage a good two decades before the current DJ craze of mash ups. In 1986 local label PopLlama Records released an album split evenly between the first two Squirrels lineups, with the Mighty Squirrels side consisting entirely of covers of songs by seminal British rockers Johnny Kidd and the Pirates, a band that most Americans had never heard of.

Over the next few years the band ran through numerous names: Squirrels Group '87, Ron Voyage and the New Squirrels, Squirrels Live Unit—one lineup that included longtime bassist Kevin Crosby and drummer Nate Johnson went by "Crosby, Squirrels, and Nate"—before finally settling down to just The Squirrels. The equally varied lineups intersected such Seattle groups as YFF, The Fastbacks, The Dynette Set, The Posies, and Pure Joy, and included several people with extensive musical theater experience. Guitarist/vocalist Joey Kline, who joined in 1985 and would become a long-term Squirrel, often "borrowed" musicians for the Squirrels from his many other musical projects.

Other than Morgan and Kline, the band has had considerable turnover, with many musicians coming and going several times over the years. Erickson died of leukemia in 1996. Among the other frequent contributors have been jazz and soul guitarist Jimmy "J.T." Thomas, drummers Hollis the Bug & James "Cookie" Cookman, guitar wiz Aaron "A.T." Taylor, and bassist Matt Fox; for a time, a woman named Mary K. would show up on stage for every show and (almost inaudibly) "play" a slinky. The band has also had guest appearances by the likes of Re Styles of the Tubes, Roy Loney of Flamin' Groovies, Tortelvis of Dread Zeppelin, and Skerik of Critters Buggin'. By 2005, the band had taken on more of a "hobby rocker" status: with the band performing only a handful of shows a year, almost entirely within the Seattle city limits. Still, they maintained a steady & fairly rabid fanbase, with fans routinely flying in from all over the country for the band's annual XXXmas X-travaganza, an institution since 1990 that featured the Drunken Angel Bodyguards.

After a long hiatus, the band revived in 2017 in the wake of the election of Donald Trump for a "Squirrels Trump Hate" tour. At this time Adam McKinney described them in the Weekly Volcano as "musical anarchists" and "a huge point of pride for the Puget Sound music scene." Andrew Hamlin, writing in Seattle weekly The Stranger described them as "still one of the city's greatest bands, now and forever. ... Rob Morgan... knows every rock-and-roll song ever recorded and can kill on at least five of them at the same time."

== Music ==
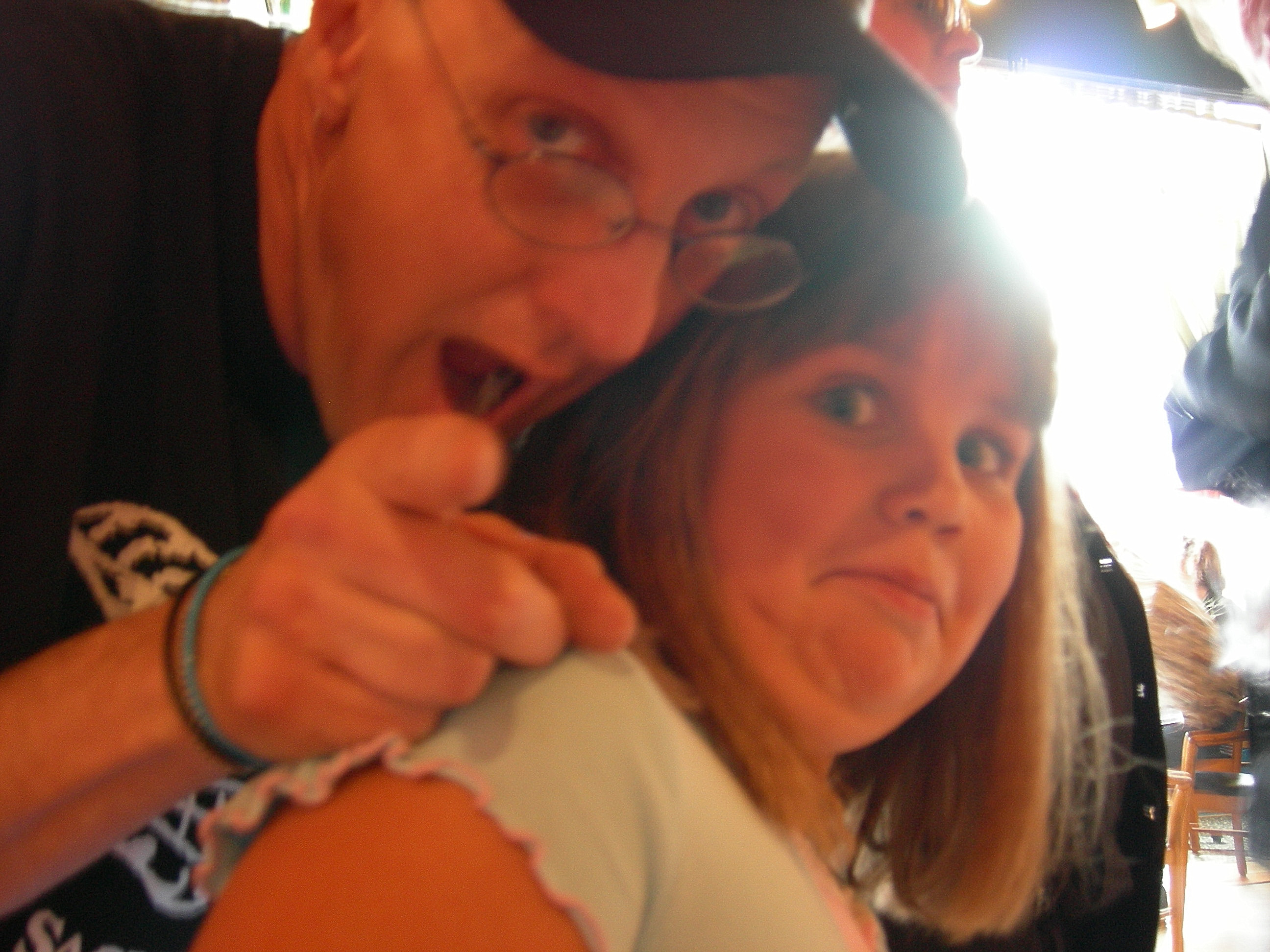
Lead vocalist Rob Morgan with young fan, 2006

Many of the songs the Squirrels perform live have never been released, because their tendency to combine elements of multiple songs raises issues with copyright law and tests the limits of fair use. Nonetheless, they have released numerous recordings over the years, some of them in general releases, others in limited editions.

The Squirrels' single "Oz On 45" (1988) was a "Stars on 45"-style reworking of songs from The Wizard of Oz (and a fragment of a song about Oz by Mark Nichols). It was one of the 142 seven-inch records that British DJ John Peel had set aside in a box, to be grabbed if his house ever caught fire and he had to abandon the rest of his collection. (It had a typically eccentric B-side: Gilbert O'Sullivan's "Alone Again (Naturally)".)

The Squirrels' The Not-So-Bright Side of the Moon was a reworking of Pink Floyd's album The Dark Side of the Moon; its packaging also referenced the original, with light being refracted through Rob Morgan's head rather than a prism.

Perhaps the most widely respected Squirrels album is The Not-So-Bright Side of the Moon (2000), a song-by-song cover of the Pink Floyd album The Dark Side of the Moon, described by Jim DeRogatis, of the Chicago Sun-Times as a "...brilliant through-the-looking-glass reimagining of Pink Floyd's classic..."

The best recorded evidence of the Squirrels recombinant approach can be found on their Christmas recordings, such as "Smoke on the Housetop" (combining Deep Purple's "Smoke on the Water" with B.R. Hanby's "Up on the Housetop"), "Peaceful Easy Town of Bethlehem" (combining The Eagles' "Peaceful Easy Feeling" with "O Little Town of Bethlehem"), or the lyrics of the carol "Joy to the World" sung to the tune of the Three Dog Night song of the same name.

== Discography ==
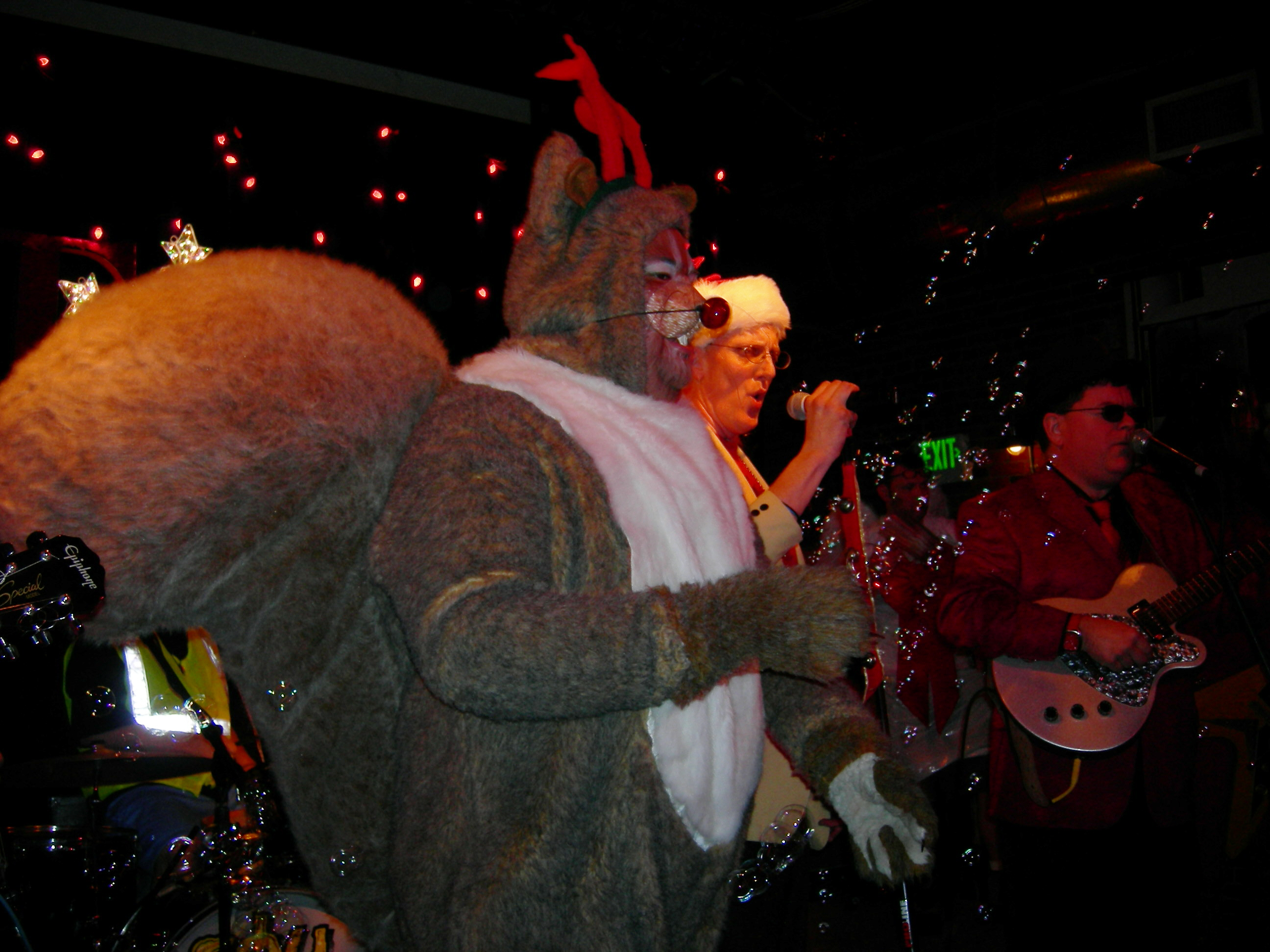
Rob, joined onstage by a fan in an elaborate squirrel costume, XXXmas show, December 2006

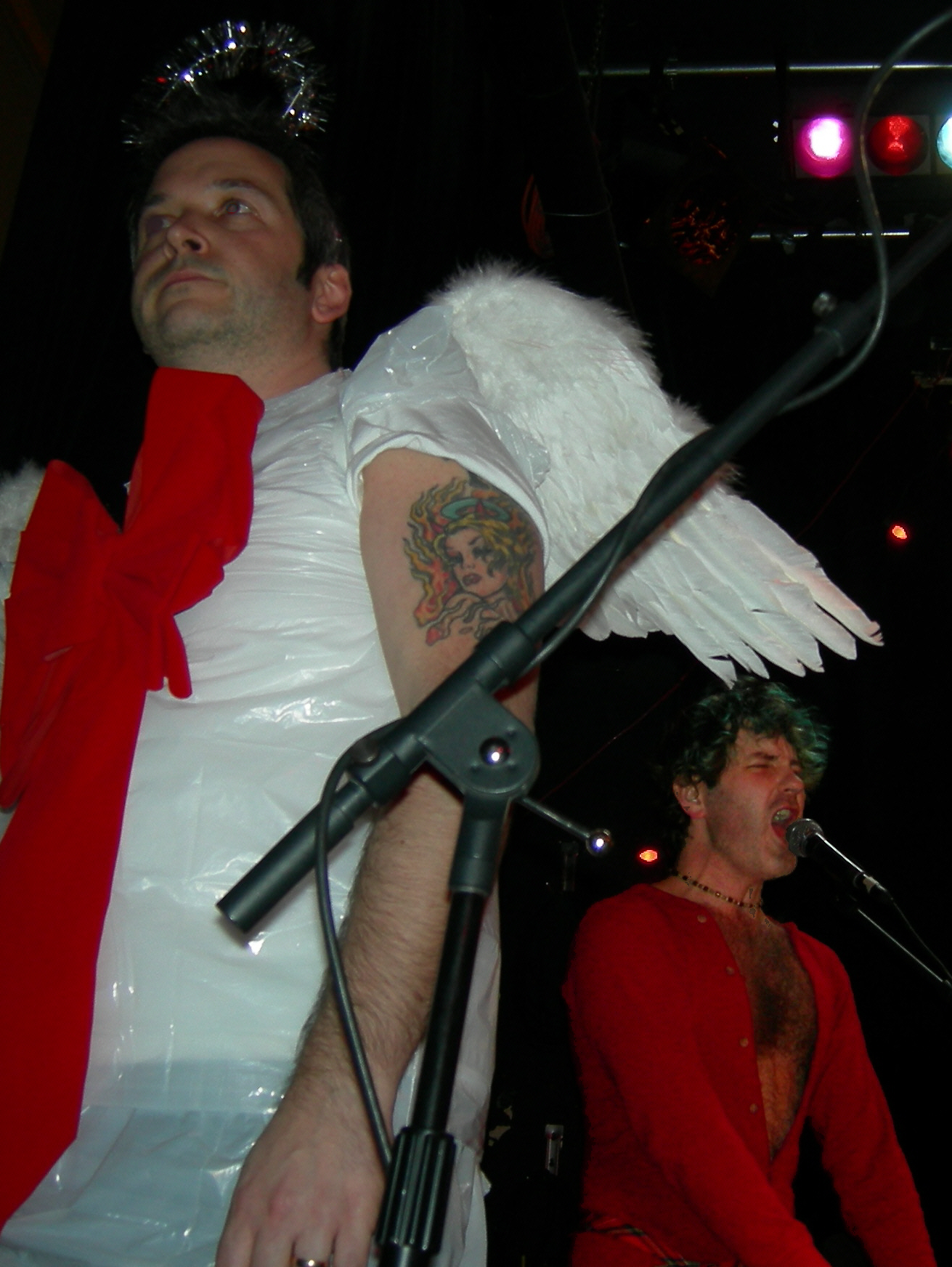
Keyboardist Mark Nichols in background; a "Fallen Angel" in foreground, XXXmas show, December 2006

- The Pudz, "Take a letter Maria" b/w "Take me to your (leader)". 1981 Teenie Wompum Records (45 RPM); "Take me to your, (leader)" was also included in the 1981 Engram Records compilation Seattle Syndrome Volume One and in Wild And Wooly-The Northwest Rock Collection, 2000 Experience Music Project/Sub Pop double CD.
- New Age Urban Squirrels, "Get Down" (Gilbert O'Sullivan) on 1986 Popllama sampler 12 Inch Combo Deluxe.
- New Age Urban Squirrels Five Virgins, Ernest Anyway and the Mighty, Mighty Squirrels Sing the Hits of Johnny Kidd and the Pirates; 1986 "split" LP, PopLlama
- The Squirrels Group "Oz on 45" b/w "Alone Again (Naturally)" 1988 Popllama (45 RPM)
- Mark Nichols / Puddletown Youth Symphony, "Little Boy Goes to Hell" 1988 Popllama
  - A musical by Nichols; released as a box set of four 7-inch 45 RPM records with book illustrated by Rob Morgan; cast included Morgan, Kline, Nichols, Tad Hutchinson, Tom Vail (all sometime Squirrels) and many others.
- The Mighty Squirrels, "Game of Love" and "Laughin' Your Head Off"; on compilation Oh, GOD! My Mom's on Channel 10!, 1989 Nardwuar the Human Serviette (Canada) LP
- The Squirrels Group, What Gives? (15 Big Ones), 1990 Popllama CD
- The Squirrels, "Beautiful Sunday / Seasons in the Sun / The Hustle"; split 7-inch EP with Show Business Giants (Blobs, Vol. 2), 1991 Way Out! Records (Canada)
- The Squirrels, "Betsy", on compilation Clam Chowder and Ice vs. Big Macs and Bombers, 1992 Nardwuar the Human Serviette (Canada) LP
- The Squirrels, "Seasons in the Sun / The Hustle", on compilation 20 More Explosive Fantastic Rockin' Mega Smash Hit Explosions, 1992 Pravda Records CD
- The Squirrels, Don't Fear The Snowman (The Squirrels' Christmas Album) 1992 Popllama cassette
- The Squirrels, Harsh Toke of Reality 1993 Popllama CD
- The Squirrels, "Let It Be" on compilation The EXOTIC BEATLES part 2, 1994 Exotica Records (United Kingdom)
- The Squirrels, Son of Snowman / Don't Fear the Snowman (Expanded Xmas album!) 1994 Poplust Audio/PopLlama cassette
- Roy Loney & the Longshots, Full Grown Head 1994 Shake Records (Canada), 1995 Real Cool Records (Japan)
  - Band includes Joey Kline, Jimbo Sangster, Scott McCaughey, Tad Hutchison, all sometime Squirrels; Rob Morgan is "guest vocalist" on 2 tracks.
- The Squirrels, "Too Bad", on compilation Peace Wave (Seattle Peace Concerts compilation CD Vol. 2) 1996 Seattle Peace Concerts CD
- The Squirrels, Scrapin' for Hits (27 song "Best Of" CD), 1996 Poplust Audio CD
- The Squirrels, "With All My Might", on Sparks tribute Amateur Hour-When Do I Get To Do It My Way; AAIIEE (with Rob Morgan on vocals) "At Home At Work At Play"; 1999 Fan Mael Records (The Netherlands)
- The Squirrels, The Not-So-Bright Side Of The Moon, 2000: Popllama Products
- The Squirrels, Digital Snowman (expanded CD-R version of the Christmas album) 2000 Poplust Audio
- The Squirrels, Live Bootleg Vol. One (limited edition CD-R, booklet) 2001 Poplust Audio Archival Series
- The Squirrels, "Hawaii Take 5-0", on compilation Hold The Vocals: A Tribute to the Instrumental Hits of the 50s 60s 70s 2001 GO-Kustom Rekords
- The Squirrels, Rock Polisher, recorded 2002, not yet released.
- The Squirrels, SQ/25, 2009 Spirderdog Records/Rancho Canyon Music, under license from Poplust Audio
