= The Fartz =

American hardcore punk band

- Origin: Seattle, Washington, U.S.
- Genres: Hardcore punk
- Years active: 1981–1983, 1999–2003
- Label: Alternative Tentacles
- Past members: Blaine Cook; Tommy Hansen; Paul Dana aka Paul Solger; Steve Hofmann; Loud Fart; Duff McKagan; Alex "Maggot Brain" Sibbald; Karl "Detonator" Fowler

The Fartz were a hardcore punk band that was founded in 1981 and were one of the first well-known bands in their genre from Seattle, Washington. They were signed to Jello Biafra's Alternative Tentacles Record label. They were notable not only for playing incredibly fast and heavy music, but also for their politically and socially conscious song lyrics that criticized government policies, religious hypocrisy, racism, sexism, and poverty. Throughout their musical career they championed a blue collar, working class perspective on life.

== History ==
=== Early career ===
The Fartz original lineup in 1981 included vocalist Blaine Cook, guitarist Tommy Hansen, bassist Steve Hofmann, and drummer Loud Fart. Hansen and Fart had formerly played together in the Seattle band, Kaos. Cook and Hofmann had first met in 1979 when they worked together at a local restaurant called Red Robin. Hansen taught Hofmann how to play bass. Hofmann asked Fart to play drums when he saw him tinkering with Robo's drum kit at a Black Flag show in Seattle. In the punk tradition of the Ramones, each member of the band took on the family name Fart, so they became known as Blaine Fart, Tommy Fart, Steve Fart and Loud Fart.

On the strength of the nine song Because This Fuckin' World Stinks E.P. produced by Neil Hubbard and self-released by the band on their own Fartz Records in 1981 as a 7-inch vinyl 45, they were signed to Jello Biafra's San Francisco-based Alternative Tentacles Records, which released their full length LP entitled World Full of Hate in 1982 as Virus 17, and also re-released their first single as Virus 21 later that same year. This made the Fartz the first Seattle band since Heart to break out of the local music scene and get signed to an out-of-town record label. They also had one song, "Campaign Speech," appear on the 1981 Seattle Syndrome Vol. I compilation released by Engram Records.

Paul Dana, who had earlier been in the proto-hardcore Seattle band Solger, replaced Hansen on guitar during the recording of the band's 1982 album, although Hansen still played on five of the 15 tracks on the LP. After the recording of the first LP was completed in June 1982, Fart was replaced on drums by Duff McKagan, who played on a five-song demo recording that was made in November 1982 but not released until 1990. McKagan's role in the Fartz has sometimes been exaggerated. Cook has been quoted as saying McKagan was only "in the band for a few months," while Hofmann had said he only played one or two shows with McKagan in the Fartz.

During their brief two-year existence, the Fartz became known as one of the trilogy of West Coast hardcore punk bands that included San Francisco's Dead Kennedys and Vancouver´s D.O.A. These three groups often played together up and down the West Coast between San Francisco, California and Vancouver. The Fartz song "Buried Alive" appeared on the Eastern Front Vol. II punk compilation album released by Enigma Records in 1983, along with tracks by other West Coast hardcore punk acts such as The Lewd, Channel 3, Wasted Youth, Shattered Faith, and JFA. Despite their regional reputation, the Fartz had a difficult time getting booked to play clubs in their own hometown of Seattle, although their practice space was in the backstage area of the Showbox Theater on First Avenue, where many of the early all ages punk shows took place while the venue was managed by Modern Productions.

=== 10 Minute Warning ===
After several changes to the lineup in the guitar and drummer positions, by mid-November 1982 the first incarnation of the Fartz had evolved into a new band known as 10 Minute Warning. The original idea was that the Fartz would simply change their name to 10 Minute Warning, but after one west coast tour with the Dead Kennedys in the Fall of 1982, Blaine was replaced on vocals by Steve Swad (formerly of The Wad Squad). Duff switched from drums to rhythm guitar, Paul continued to play lead guitar, and Greg Gillmore joined on drums. These lineup changes resulted in a post-punk sound quite different from the hardcore of the Fartz. 10 Minute Warning continued with this new lineup and sound throughout 1983, and recorded some additional still unreleased demos, before finally disbanding. Greg Gillmore would later go on to join Mother Love Bone.

=== Disbanding ===
After a one-off July 4, 1983 reunion show featuring the lineup of Blaine, Steve, Paul, and Duff, the former members of the Fartz went their separate ways for the next 15 years. Fartz vocalist Blaine Cook started to sing for the hardcore/thrash band The Accüsed in 1984. In the same year Duff McKagan moved to Los Angeles and became the bass player for the hard rock band Guns N' Roses within the next year. The Fartz original guitarist Tommy Hansen later played with the band Crisis Party, which released one LP, Rude Awakening, on Capitol Records in 1989.

=== Reforming ===
Interest in the Fartz began to revive in 1990 with the release in Germany of a vinyl only LP entitled You, We See You Crawling, which was composed of previously unreleased demo tapes recorded in 1981-1982. In 1998 Alternative Tentacles issued a retrospective anthology of all the group's previous recordings entitled Because This Fuckin' World Still Stinks. It was the first time any of the Fartz material had been available on CD; all of their previous releases having been vinyl only. The 1998 CD included all the songs from both the 1981 EP and the 1982 LP, as well as unreleased demos that included some songs recorded after the band had changed its name to 10 Minute Warning. Out of the 35 tracks on this anthology, Tommy Hansen played guitar on 15 of them, and Paul Solger on the other 20.

The release of the 1998 Fartz anthology by Alternative Tentacles prompted Blaine to reunite the lineup that had recorded the majority of the World Full of Hate LP: Steve, Paul, and Loud. However, this lineup had already changed by June 2000 when a new lineup recorded the four-song N.W.T.O. E.P. Loud was replaced on drums by Karl Fowler of the Detonators soon after their reunion, while Paul Solger played with reformed Fartz for about a year before he was replaced by Alex "Maggot Brain" Sibbald, who had been the bass player in Blaine's other band, The Accüsed, leaving Blaine and Steve as the only two original members in the reunited Fartz. According to an interview with Blaine, Paul was fired from the reformed Fartz after he failed to show up for the band's performance at Jeff Gilbert's "Pain in the Grass" music festival, and almost missed another show in Portland, Oregon.

It was the lineup of Blaine, Steve, Alex and Karl that recorded the Fartz new studio LP, What's In A Name?, which was produced by Jack Endino and released by Alternative Tentacles in the summer of 2001. Most of these new studio tracks were re-recordings of their earlier songs, except for a new cover of the Motorhead song "Iron Fist," which had also appeared on the N.W.T.O. E.P. The back cover of the 2001 LP paid homage to the band's previous members by stating, "Special thanx to Ex-Fartz: Paul Solger, Loud, Tommy Hansen." It then humorously added, "We apologize for Duff."

This second reincarnation of the Fartz released a full-length studio LP of 15 completely new songs produced by Jack Endino called Injustice on the Alternative Tentacles label in 2002, as well as a live LP called Viet-Raq that was released the same year. This 2002 live album combined recordings of two performances in Washington state, one at The Breakroom on February 18, 2000; and a second show at The Lobo Bar on June 29, 2002. The 28 tracks include songs such as "Is This The Way," and "Buried Alive," that have also been associated with the band 10 Minute Warning, as they were first recorded in late 1982 when the Fartz were in the process of changing their name and their lineup. The final incarnation of the reformed Fartz continued to play live shows in the Pacific Northwest until 2003 when Blaine and Alex rejoined a reformed Accused, and then a few years later the duo joined the band Toe Tag.

=== Alternate Versions of Songs ===
Due to the band's evolution from the Fartz into 10 Minute Warning and the Accüsed, and then back into the Fartz again, some of the same songs have been recorded by three or four incarnations of the band. "Is This The Way," "Judgement Day," and "Buried Alive" were all recorded by various versions of the Fartz and 10 Minute Warning. The Accüsed also re-recorded some Fartz songs.

== Band members ==
1981-1982:

- Blaine Cook (vocals)
- Steve Hofmann (bass)
- Tommy Hansen (guitar)
- Lloyd Shattuck (Loud Fart) (drums)

1982-1983:

- Blaine Cook (vocals)
- Steve Hofmann (bass)
- Paul Dana aka Paul Solger (guitar)
- Duff McKagan (drums)

1999:

- Blaine Cook (vocals)
- Steve Hofmann (bass)
- Paul Dana aka Paul Solger (guitar)
- Lloyd Shattuck (drums)

2000-2003:

- Blaine Cook (vocals)
- Steve Hofmann (bass)
- Alex "Maggot Brain" Sibbald (guitar)
- Karl "Detonator" Fowler (drums)

== Discography ==
- Because This Fucking World Stinks 7” EP
- 1981 "Campaign Speech" on Seattle Syndrome Volume One compilation - Engram Records.
- World Full Of Hate 12” LP
- Because This Fucking World Stinks 7” EP reissue
- 1983 "Buried Alive" on Eastern Front Vol. II compilation.
- You, We See You Crawling 12” EP
- Because This Fuckin' World Still Stinks
- N.W.T.O. 7-inch EP
- What's in a Name
- Injustice, 15 Working Class Songs
- Viet-Raq
