= The Blackouts =

Seattle punk rock band

- Origin: Seattle, Washington
- Genres: Punk rock; post-punk; hard rock
- Years active: 1979–1985
- Labels: Situation Two, Wax Trax!
- Past members: Erich Werner; Bill Rieflin; Mike Davidson; Roland Barker; Paul "Ion" Barker

The Blackouts were an American punk rock band formed in Seattle in 1979 by singer/guitarist Erich Werner, bassist Mike Davidson, and drummer Bill Rieflin, who were all former members of a local punk band, The Telepaths. They were joined by Roland Barker, first on synthesizer and later on saxophone.

Following a single and EP on small local labels, Davidson was replaced by Roland's brother Paul Barker in 1981. This line-up recorded the "Exchange of Goods" single for English label Situation Two, and relocated to Boston in 1982. There they met Al Jourgensen of Ministry, who produced their last recording, the Lost Soul's Club EP for Wax Trax! Records.

The band relocated a second time to San Francisco in 1984, and toured the East Coast with Ministry that year before breaking up. Jourgensen recruited Paul and Roland Barker and Rieflin to the line-up of Ministry, playing a major part in the transformation of Ministry from a synth-driven dance band to one of the top exponents of industrial metal. This started a long collaboration between Paul Barker and Jourgensen in Ministry, Revolting Cocks, Lard, and other projects. Rieflin released his first solo album in 1999, Birth of a Giant, worked with KMFDM, Chris Connelly, Pigface, Ruby, Peter Murphy, Nine Inch Nails, Swans, and King Crimson, and was the studio and touring drummer for R.E.M. Erich Werner went on to join the Toiling Midgets.

In 2004, Olympia's K Records released History in Reverse, compiling the band's studio recordings.
