= Top Chef VIP season 2 =

Top Chef VIP
- Season 2
- Hosted by: Carmen Villalobos
- Judges: Antonio de Livier; Adria Marina Montaño; Juan Manuel Barrientos
- No. of contestants: 20
- Winner: Alana Lliteras
- No. of episodes: 60

Release
- Original network: Telemundo
- Original release: April 25 – July 17, 2023

Season chronology
- ← Previous; Season 1 Next → Season 3

The second season of the American competitive reality television series Top Chef VIP premiered on Telemundo on April 25, 2023. The season was announced on September 24, 2022. Carmen Villalobos returned as host, with Antonio de Livier, Adria Marina Montaño and Juan Manuel Barrientos returning as judges. The winner will receive US$100,000. This season introduced a new competition to the series, the Golden Knife competition allowed celebrities to compete for a golden knife pin. The winner of this competition draws a knife before the safety challenge, with the number on the knife determining how many competitors they can save from the elimination challenge.

The season was won by Alana Lliteras, who received US$100,000.

== Contestants ==
Twenty celebrities were selected to compete in Top Chef VIP. The first group of celebrities were announced on March 14, 2023. The second group of celebrities were announced on March 21, 2023.

| Name | Age | Hometown | Notability |
|---|---|---|---|
| Alana Lliteras | 18 | Guadalajara, Mexico | MasterChef Junior México 2016 winner |
| Arturo Peniche | 60 | Mexico City, Mexico | Actor |
| Eduardo Barquin | 24 | Toluca, Mexico | Actor |
| Gaby Spanic | 49 | Guárico, Venezuela | Actress |
| Génesis Suero | 31 | Dominican Republic | TV personality |
| Germán Montero | 43 | Los Mochis, Mexico | Singer |
| Gilberto Gless | 59 | Chihuahua, Mexico | Impressionist |
| Helen Ochoa | 38 | Mendota, California | Singer |
| Isis Serrath | 32 | Mexico City, Mexico | TV personality |
| Jesús Moré | 44 | León, Mexico | Actor |
| Johnny Lozada | 55 | Caguas, Puerto Rico | Singer and actor |
| Jose Gumbs | 34 | Queens, New York | Former NFL player |
| Juan Pablo Gil | 33 | Sinaloa, Mexico | Actor |
| Laura Zapata | 66 | Mexico City, Mexico | Actress |
| Lorena de la Garza | 48 | McAllen, Texas | Actress |
| Marisol Terrazas | 47 | Chicago, Illinois | Singer |
| Regina Orozco | 59 | Mexico City, Mexico | Actress and singer |
| Sara Corrales | 37 | Medellín, Colombia | Actress |
| Sebastián Villalobos | 27 | Bucaramanga, Colombia | Influencer |
| Tony Balardi | 67 | Veracruz, Mexico | Comedian |

== Contestant progress ==
| Episode # | | 1 | | 2 | 3 | | 4 | 5 | | 6 | | 7 | | 8 | | 9 | 10^{1} | | 11 | | 12 | 13 | | 14 | 15 | | 16 | | 17 | | 18 | | 19 | 20^{2} | | 21 | 22 | | 23 | | 24 | 25 | | 26 | | 27 | | 28 | | 29 | 30 | | 31 | | 32 | | 33 | | 34 | 35 | | 36 | | 37 | | 38 | | 39 | 40 | | 41 | | 42 | | 43 | | 44 | 45 | | 46 | | 47 | | 48 | | 49 | 50 | | 51 | | 52 | | 53 | | 54 | | 55 | | 56 | | 57 | | | 58 | 59 | 60 |
|---|---|---|---|---|---|---|---|---|---|---|---|---|---|---|---|---|---|---|---|---|---|---|---|---|---|---|---|---|---|---|---|---|---|---|---|---|---|---|---|---|---|---|---|---|---|---|---|---|---|---|---|---|---|---|---|---|---|---|---|---|---|---|---|---|---|---|---|---|---|---|---|---|---|---|---|---|---|---|---|---|---|---|---|---|---|---|---|---|---|---|---|---|---|---|---|---|---|---|---|---|---|---|---|---|---|---|
| 1 | Alana | IN | — | IN | IN | — | WIN | IMM | IMM | IN | — | WIN | IN | WIN | WIN | WIN | IMM | IMM | IN | — | IN | IN | — | LOW | IN | IN | IN | — | WIN | WIN | IN | — | IMM | IMM | IMM | IN | WIN | IN | IN | WIN | WIN | IMM | IMM | WIN | IN | WIN | IN | HIGH | — | WIN | IMM | IMM | WIN | IN | IN | IN | WIN | IMM | LOW | WIN | IMM | WIN | IN | WIN | WIN | IMM | IMM | LOW | IN | WIN | WIN | IN | WIN | WIN | IMM | IMM | WIN | IMM | IMM | WIN | IN | WIN | IN | IN | IN | WIN | IMM | IMM | WIN | IN | IN | WIN | IMM | IMM | WIN | WIN | IMM | IMM | IMM | IMM | IMM | IMM | IMM | IN | WIN | WINNER |
| 2 | Germán | WIN | WIN | IN | IN | — | —N/a | IN | IN | IN | — | IN | — | IN | — | WIN | IMM | IMM | IN | — | IN | IN | — | WIN | IMM | IMM | IN | — | WIN | IN | IN | — | WIN | IMM | IMM | IN | IN | — | IN | IN | WIN | IMM | IMM | IN | — | IN | — | LOW | — | WIN | IMM | IMM | IN | — | IN | IN | IN | IN | WIN | IMM | IMM | IN | — | IN | IN | IN | IN | LOW | WIN | IMM | WIN | WIN | IMM | IMM | IMM | IMM | LOW | WIN | IMM | WIN | IN | IN | WIN | IMM | IMM | LOW | IN | WIN | WIN | IN | IN | WIN | IMM | IMM | WIN | IN | IN | WIN | IMM | IMM | IMM | IMM | IMM | IN | WIN | RUNNER-UP |
| 2 | Laura | WIN | IN | IN | IN | — | WIN | IMM | IMM | IN | — | IN | — | IN | — | IN | IN | IN | —N/a | —N/a | WIN | IMM | IMM | IMM | IMM | IMM | IN | — | IN | — | WIN | IN | WIN | IMM | IMM | WIN | IN | — | IMM | IMM | LOW | IN | IN | IN | — | WIN | WIN | IMM | IMM | IMM | IMM | IMM | WIN | IN | IN | IN | IN | IN | WIN | IMM | IMM | IN | — | IN | IN | IN | IN | WIN | IMM | IMM | IN | — | IN | IN | IN | IN | WIN | IMM | IMM | IN | — | IN | IN | WIN | IMM | WIN | IMM | IMM | WIN | IN | IN | IN | IN | IN | IN | — | IN | IN | WIN | WIN | IMM | IMM | IMM | IN | WIN | RUNNER-UP |
| 2 | Sebastián | IN | — | WIN | IN | — | WIN | IMM | IMM | WIN | IN | WIN | HIGH | HIGH | — | WIN | IMM | IMM | IN | — | IN | IN | — | LOW | IMM | IMM | IMM | IN | IN | — | WIN | WIN | WIN | IMM | IMM | WIN | WIN | IN | IMM | IMM | LOW | IN | WIN | IN | — | IN | — | WIN | WIN | IMM | IMM | IMM | IN | — | IN | IN | IN | IN | LOW | IN | IN | WIN | IN | WIN | WIN | IMM | IMM | WIN | IMM | IMM | WIN | IN | IN | WIN | IMM | IMM | WIN | IMM | IMM | IN | — | IN | IN | IN | IN | WIN | IMM | IMM | WIN | WIN | IMM | IMM | IMM | IMM | IN | — | IN | — | WIN | IN | WIN | WIN | IMM | WIN | IMM | RUNNER-UP |
| 5 | Jesús | IN | — | IN | IN | — | LOW | WIN | IMM | IN | — | WIN | IN | WIN | IN | WIN | IMM | IMM | WIN | IN | IN | WIN | IN | LOW | WIN | IMM | WIN | IN | IN | — | IN | — | WIN | IMM | IMM | IN | WIN | IN | WIN | IMM | WIN | IMM | IMM | IN | — | WIN | IN | HIGH | — | WIN | IMM | IMM | WIN | WIN | IMM | IMM | IMM | IMM | LOW | IN | IN | IN | — | IN | IN | IN | OUT | | | | | | | | | | | | | | | | | | | WIN^{4} | IMM | IMM | WIN | IN | IN | IN | IN | IN | WIN | IN | IN | IN | IN | — | WIN | IN | WIN | IN | OUT | |
| 6 | Arturo | IN | — | IN | IN | — | WIN | IMM | IMM | IN | — | —N/a | —N/a | —N/a | —N/a | WIN | IMM | IMM | IN | — | IN | IN | — | LOW | IN | IN | WIN | WIN | IMM | IMM | IN | — | IMM | IMM | IMM | IN | IN | — | IN | IN | LOW | WIN | IMM | IN | — | WIN | IN | LOW | — | LOW | IN | IN | IN | — | WIN | WIN | IMM | IMM | WIN | IMM | IMM | IN | — | IN | IN | IN | IN | WIN | IMM | IMM | IN | — | IN | WIN | IMM | IMM | LOW | IN | IN | WIN | IN | IN | WIN | IMM | IMM | LOW | WIN | IMM | WIN | IN | WIN | IN | WIN | IMM | IN | — | IN | — | WIN | IN | IN | — | OUT | | | |
| 7 | Génesis | IN | — | IN | IN | — | LOW | WIN | IMM | WIN | HIGH | IN | — | IN | — | IN | IN | IN | IN | — | IN | WIN | IN | LOW | IN | WIN | IN | — | IN | — | WIN | IN | LOW | IN | IN | WIN | IN | — | IMM | IMM | WIN | IMM | IMM | WIN | WIN | IN | — | WIN | IN | WIN | IMM | IMM | IN | — | IN | IN | WIN | IMM | LOW | WIN | IMM | WIN | WIN | IMM | IMM | IMM | IMM | LOW | IN | WIN | IN | — | IN | IN | IN | IN | WIN | IMM | IMM | WIN | WIN | IMM | IMM | IMM | IMM | LOW | IN | LOW | WIN | IN | IN | IN | IN | OUT | | | | | | | | | | | | |
| 8 | Helen | IN | — | IN | WIN | IN | WIN | IMM | IMM | IN | — | WIN | IN | IN | — | IN | IMM | IMM | IN | — | IN | WIN | IN | WIN | IMM | IMM | IN | — | IN | — | IN | — | LOW | IMM | IMM | IN | WIN | WIN | IMM | IMM | WIN | IMM | IMM | IN | — | IN | — | HIGH | — | WIN | IMM | IMM | IN | — | IN | IN | IN | IN | WIN | IMM | IMM | IN | — | IN | IN | WIN | IMM | LOW | IN | OUT | | | | | | | | | | | | | | | | LOW^{4} | IN | OUT | | | | | | | | | | | | | | | | | | |
| 9 | Sara | WIN | IN | IN | WIN | WIN | IMM | IMM | IMM | IN | — | IN | — | WIN | IN | WIN | IMM | IMM | IN | — | IN | WIN | IN | LOW | IN | IN | IN | — | WIN | IN | IN | — | LOW | IN | IN | IN | IN | — | WIN | IMM | LOW | IN | IN | WIN | WIN | IN | — | WIN | IN | WIN | IMM | IMM | IN | — | WIN | WIN | IMM | IMM | WIN | IMM | IMM | WIN | WIN | IMM | IMM | IMM | IMM | WIN | IMM | IMM | IN | — | IN | IN | IN | IN | LOW | IN | IN | IN | — | IN | IN | IN | OUT | | | | | | | | | | | | | | | | | | | | | |
| 10 | Juan Pablo | IN | — | IN | IN | — | WIN | IMM | IMM | IN | — | IN | — | IN | — | WIN | IMM | IMM | WIN | HIGH | IN | IN | — | WIN | IMM | IMM | IN | — | WIN | IN | WIN | IN | WIN | IMM | IMM | IN | WIN | IN | WIN | IMM | LOW | WIN | IMM | WIN | WIN | WIN | IN | LOW | — | LOW | IN | IN | WIN | IN | IN | IN | WIN | IMM | LOW | IN | IN | WIN | IN | IN | IN | IN | IN | WIN | IMM | IMM | WIN | IN | WIN | IN | WIN | IMM | LOW | IN | OUT | | | | | | | | | | | | | | | | | | | | | | | | | | | |
| 11 | Marisol | IN | — | IN | WIN | IN | LOW | IMM | IMM | IN | — | IN | — | IN | — | IN | WIN | IMM | WIN | HIGH | IN | IN | — | WIN | IMM | IMM | IN | — | IN | — | —N/a | —N/a | LOW | WIN | IMM | IN | IN | — | WIN | IMM | LOW | WIN | IMM | IN | — | IN | — | WIN | HIGH | LOW | IN | IN | IN | — | IN | IN | WIN | IMM | WIN | IMM | IMM | —N/a | —N/a | —N/a | —N/a | —N/a | —N/a | —N/a | IN | LOW | IN | — | IN | IN | IN | OUT | | | | | | | | | | | | | | | | | | | | | | | | | | | | | | |
| 12 | Eduardo | IN | — | WIN | IN | — | LOW | WIN | IMM | IN | — | WIN | IN | HIGH | — | IN | IMM | IMM | WIN | IN | IN | WIN | WIN | IMM | IMM | IMM | WIN | IN | IN | — | IN | — | WIN | IMM | IMM | IN | WIN | IN | WIN | IMM | WIN | IMM | IMM | WIN | IN | IN | — | HIGH | — | LOW | WIN | IMM | IMM | IN | WIN | WIN | IMM | IMM | LOW | IN | OUT | | | | | | | | | | | | | | | | | | | | | | | | | | | | | | | | | | | | | | | | | | | | | |
| 13 | Jose | IN | — | IN | IN | — | WIN | IMM | IMM | WIN | IN | IN | — | IN | — | IN | IMM | IMM | IN | — | IN | IN | — | LOW | IMM | IMM | IN | — | IN | — | WIN | IN | WIN | IMM | IMM | WIN | IN | — | IMM | IMM | LOW | IN | LOW | IN | — | IN | — | LOW | — | LOW | IN | IN | IN | — | IN | IN | IN | OUT | | | | | | | | | | | | | | | | | | | | | | | | | | | | | | | | | | | | | | | | | | | | | | | | |
| 14 | Tony | IN | — | IN | IN | — | LOW | IN | IN | IN | — | IN | — | WIN | IN | IN | IN | IN | WIN | IN | IN | IN | — | WIN | IMM | IMM | WIN | IN | IN | — | IN | — | LOW | IN | LOW | IN | IN | — | WIN | IMM | WIN | IMM | IMM | WIN | IN | IN | — | LOW | — | LOW | IN | OUT | | | | | | | | | | | | | | | | | | | | | | | | | | | | | | | | | | | | | | | | | | | | | | | | | | | | | | |
| 15 | Johnny | IN | — | IN | IN | — | LOW | WIN | IMM | IN | — | IN | — | IN | — | IN | IN | IN | WIN | WIN | IN | IN | — | WIN | IMM | IMM | IN | — | IN | — | IN | — | LOW | IMM | IMM | IN | IN | — | IN | LOW | LOW | IN | OUT | | | | | | | | | | | | | | | | | | | | | | | | | | | | | | | | | | | | | | | | | | | | | | | | | | | | | | | | | | | | | | | |
| 16 | Serrath | IN | — | WIN | WIN | IN | WIN | IMM | IMM | IN | — | IN | — | IN | — | WIN | IMM | IMM | IN | — | IN | WIN | IN | WIN | IMM | IMM | IN | — | IN | — | IN | — | LOW | IN | LOW | IN | IN | — | IN | OUT | | | | | | | | | | | | | | | | | | | | | | | | | | | | | | | | | | | | | | | | | | | | | | | | | | | | | | | | | | | | | | | | | | |
| 17 | Gaby | WIN | IN | WIN | IN | — | WIN | IMM | IMM | IN | — | WIN | WIN | HIGH | — | IMM | IMM | IMM | IN | — | IN | IN | — | WIN | IMM | IMM | IN | — | IN | — | —N/a | —N/a | WDR^{3} | | | | | | | | | | | | | | | | | | | | | | | | | | | | | | | | | | | | | | | | | | | | | | | | | | | | | | | | | | | | | | | | | | | | | | | | | |
| 18 | Gilberto | IN | — | IN | IN | — | LOW | IN | IN | WIN | WIN | IMM | IMM | IN | — | IMM | IMM | IMM | IN | — | IN | IN | — | LOW | IN | OUT | | | | | | | | | | | | | | | | | | | | | | | | | | | | | | | | | | | | | | | | | | | | | | | | | | | | | | | | | | | | | | | | | | | | | | | | | | | | | | | | |
| 19 | Regina | IN | — | IN | WIN | WIN | IMM | IMM | IMM | WIN | IN | IN | — | IN | — | IN | IN | OUT | | | | | | | | | | | | | | | | | | | | | | | | | | | | | | | | | | | | | | | | | | | | | | | | | | | | | | | | | | | | | | | | | | | | | | | | | | | | | | | | | | | | | | | | |
| 20 | Lorena | IN | — | IN | IN | — | LOW | IN | OUT | | | | | | | | | | | | | | | | | | | | | | | | | | | | | | | | | | | | | | | | | | | | | | | | | | | | | | | | | | | | | | | | | | | | | | | | | | | | | | | | | | | | | | | | | | | | | | | | | |

^Note 1: Laura was unable to participate in the challenges and Germán competed on her behalf.
^Note 2: Serrath was unable to participate in the challenges and Germán competed on her behalf.
^Note 3: Gaby decided to withdraw from the competition for personal reasons.
^Note 4: Helen and Jesús won the Re-entry Challenge and returned to the competition.

(WINNER) The chef won the season and was crowned "Top Chef".
(RUNNER-UP) The chef was a runner-up for the season.
(WIN) The celebrity won the Quickfire Challenge, Immunity Challenge, Safety Challenge, or Elimination Challenge.
(WIN) The celebrity was on the winning team in the Team Challenge and directly advanced to the next round.
(HIGH) The celebrity was selected as one of the top entries in an individual or team challenge, but did not win.
(IN) The celebrity was not selected as one of the top or bottom entries in an individual challenge and was safe.
(IN) The celebrity was not selected as a top or bottom entry in a Team Challenge.
(IMM) The celebrity didn't have to compete in that round of the competition and was safe from elimination.
(IMM) The celebrity had to compete in that round of the competition but was safe from elimination.
(—) The celebrity did not quality for a challenge.
(—) The celebrity was unable to participate due to personal reasons.
(LOW) The celebrity was selected as one of the bottom entries in the Elimination Challenge, but was not eliminated.
(LOW) The celebrity was one of the bottom entries in a Team Challenge.
(OUT) The celebrity lost the Elimination Challenge.

== Episodes ==
| No. overall | No. in season | Title | Original release date | US viewers (millions) |
|---|---|---|---|---|
| 36 | 1 | "El as bajo la manga" | April 25, 2023 | 0.97 |
Quickfire Challenge: The celebrities, working in pairs, had the free challenge to prepare a dish that reflects their personalities. The top two pairs advanced to the "Golden Knife" challenge.: Winners: Germán and Laura, Gaby and Sara; Golden Knife Challenge: The winners of the Quickfire challenge were given 60 minutes to prepare a dish using their favorite ingredient, which they were asked about before entering the competition. The winner received the Golden Knife that can be used to save anyone from the bottom entries, including themselves.: Winner: Germán
| 37 | 2 | "Ingenio, habilidad y sazón" | April 26, 2023 | 0.89 |
Quickfire Challenge: The celebrities, working in pairs assigned via knife draw, were given 60 minutes to cook any dish but had to be tied back to back and each member do 10-minute relays. The top two pairs became team captains in the next team challenge.: Winners: Eduardo and Sebastián, Gaby and Serrath; Skills Challenge: The remaining celebrities competed in a skills challenge of three stages: julienne an onion, separate ten eggs, and whisk the ten egg yolks with sugar. Once a celebrity completed the three stages they were able to choose which team they wanted to join. Lorena was the last to finish the challenge and was automatically on Eduardo's team.
| 38 | 3 | "En busca de la primera inmunidad" | April 27, 2023 | 0.77 |
Team Challenge: The celebrities were given 60 minutes to prepare an appetizer and a main course using the protein they were assigned. The winning team won the opportunity to compete for immunity.: Chicken: Serrath (C), Helen, Marisol, Regina, Sara; Fish: Eduardo (C), Alana, Arturo, Gilberto, Jose; Lamb: Sebastián (C), Germán, Johnny, Lorena, Tony; Pork: Gaby (C), Genesis, Jesús, Juan Pablo, Laura; Winners: Serrath, Helen, Marisol, Regina, Sara; Immunity Challenge: The celebrities were asked to prepare a dish inspired by the most embarrassing moment in their lives. The top two celebrities received immunity from elimination and became captains in the next team challenge.: Winners: Regina and Sara
| 39 | 4 | "En el mar la vida es más sabrosa" | April 28, 2023 | 0.87 |
Express Challenge: Team captains Regina and Sara were asked to prepare a Club Sandwich. The winner would get the first pick in choosing members of their team.: Winner: Sara; Team Challenge: The teams were challenged with preparing a brunch for 25 guests. The meal had to include a dish with eggs, a side dish, and a drink. The winning team received immunity from elimination, while the losing team was sent to the next elimination challenge. Germán was unable to compete in the challenge.: Green Team: Sara (C), Alana, Arturo, Gaby, Helen, Jose, Juan Pablo, Laura, Sebastián, Serrath; Burgundy Team: Regina (C), Eduardo, Génesis, Gilberto, Jesús, Johnny, Lorena, Marisol, Tony; Winners: Sara, Alana, Arturo, Gaby, Helen, Jose, Juan Pablo, Laura, Sebastián, Serrath
| 40 | 5 | "Emociones al toque" | May 1, 2023 | 0.96 |
Germán, winner of the Golden Knife, had to save one of the bottom entries. He decided to save Marisol. Safety Challenge: The celebrities working in pairs assigned via knife draw, were given two matches to use to shop in the pantry that is in absolute darkness. They were given 60 minutes to prepare a meal using the ingredients they gathered. The top two pairs were safe from elimination.: Génesis, Jesús; Germán, Gilberto; Johnny, Eduardo; Lorena, Tony; Winners: Génesis, Jesús, Johnny, Eduardo; Elimination Challenge: The celebrities were challenged with preparing stew in 60 minutes.: Eliminated: Lorena
| 41 | 6 | "Cocineros de cabeza" | May 2, 2023 | 0.88 |
Team Challenge: The celebrities, working in pairs or trios, had to make a dish that incorporated four ingredients provided by a moving conveyor belt. The top two teams won the opportunity to compete for immunity.: Marisol, Tony; Alana, Serrath, Gaby; Germán, Laura; Génesis, Gilberto; Helen, Jesús, Sara; Eduardo, Johnny; Arturo, Juan Pablo; Jose, Regina, Sebastián; Winners: Jose, Regina, Sebastián and Génesis, Gilberto; Immunity Challenge: The celebrities were asked to prepare a crepes. The winner received immunity from elimination.: Winner: Gilberto
| 42 | 7 | "Cachete y colita" | May 3, 2023 | 0.88 |
Team Challenge: The celebrities, working in teams, were asked to prepare a dish using pork cuts. The teams and their cuts of pork were assigned by Gilberto. The top two teams won the opportunity to compete for immunity.: Sara, Juan Pablo; Germán, Marisol, Regina; Johnny, Jose, Serrath; Alana, Eduardo, Sebastián; Génesis, Laura, Tony; Gaby, Helen, Jesús; Winners: Gaby, Helen, Jesús and Alana, Eduardo, Sebastián; Immunity Challenge: The winners of the team challenge were given a crate with their names on it and had three minutes to pick ingredients from the pantry. Afterwards, they drew a knife to determine the order they were going to steal each others crates. The celebrities had an hour to prepare any dish using their new ingredients. The winner received immunity from elimination.: Winner: Gaby
| 43 | 8 | "Innovar desde la tradición" | May 4, 2023 | 0.85 |
Quickfire Challenge: The celebrities were given 60 minutes to prepare arepas. The top four entries advanced to the "Golden Knife" challenge.: Winners: Tony, Alana, Sara, Jesús; Golden Knife Challenge: The winners of the "Quickfire Challenge" were randomly assigned a different color. The celebrities then had to prepare a dish based on the color assigned. The winner received the Golden Knife.: Winner: Alana
| 44 | 9 | "En la tierra del mariachi" | May 5, 2023 | 0.85 |
Express Challenge: The celebrities were asked to prepare guacamole. Once a celebrity completed the challenge they were allowed to pick their partner. Gaby and Gilberto, winners of the immunity challenges, picked Laura to form a trio. Team Challenge: The pairs and trio were challenged with preparing an appetizer for fifty guests. The top four pairs received immunity from elimination.: Gaby, Gilberto, Laura; Alana, Germán; Jesús, Juan Pablo; Helen, Marisol; Serrath, Arturo; Génesis, Eduardo; Regina, Jose; Sara, Sebastián; Johnny, Tony; Winners: Alana and Germán, Serrath and Arturo, Jesús and Juan Pablo, Sara and Sebastián
| 45 | 10 | "La muerte del bogavante" | May 8, 2023 | 1.00 |
Alana, winner of the Golden Knife, had to save three of the bottom entries. She decided to save Eduardo, Jose and Helen. Laura was unable to participate in the challenges and Germán competed on her behalf. Safety Challenge: They celebrities were asked to prepare a turkey dish. Each celebrity was given 5 minutes to shop in the pantry. Afterwards, they had to roll two dice that would determine how many ingredients they had to remove from their basket. The celebrities had 60 minutes of preparation time. The winner was safe from elimination.: Winner: Marisol; Elimination Challenge: The celebrities were given 45 minutes to prepare a lobster dish.: Eliminated: Regina
| 46 | 11 | "Por el "Cuchillo de oro"" | May 9, 2023 | 1.02 |
Quickfire Challenge: The celebrities, working in teams, were given 75 minutes to prepare a dish with a protein. The celebrities had to bid on the protein they wanted and in order to pay for it, they had to give up minutes from their cooking time. The top two teams advanced to the Golden Knife Challenge. The protein chosen and minutes reduced from their cooking time were: Alana, Arturo, Serrath: Stomach for 0 minutes; Johnny, Juan Pablo, Tony: Whitefish for 35 minutes; Jose, Sebastián: Beef tongue for 35 minutes; Germán, Gilberto, Sara: Chunchullo for 15 minutes; Eduardo, Jesús, Marisol: Duck magret for 10 minutes; Gaby, Génesis, Helen: Ribeye steak for 30 minutes; Winners: Eduardo, Jesús, Marisol and Juan Pablo, Johnny, Tony; Golden Knife Challenge: The winners of the Quickfire Challenge were challenged with preparing a dish using pork rinds as the main ingredient. The winner received the Golden Knife pin.: Winner: Johnny
| 47 | 12 | "Cocina del corazón" | May 10, 2023 | 0.81 |
Immunity Challenge: The celebrities were asked prepare a dish inspired by their mothers. The winner received immunity from elimination.: Winner: Laura
| 48 | 13 | "Sinergia gastronómica" | May 11, 2023 | 0.91 |
Quickfire Challenge: The celebrities each picked a mystery box and got to choose their partner. Afterwards, they had to combine the ingredients from their mystery boxes into one single dish. The top three teams advanced to the Immunity Challenge.: Alana (Green beans), Juan Pablo (Tapioca); Arturo (Oaxaca cheese), Gilberto (Jicama), Tony (Chickpeas); Eduardo (Fennel), Jesús (Black recado); Gaby (Mushrooms), Jose (Garam masala); Génesis (Passion fruit), Sara (Pork ribs); Germán (Clams), Marisol (Coconut milk); Helen (Achiote paste), Serrath (Guineafowl); Johnny (Whole squid), Sebastián (Guava); Winners: Helen and Serrath, Génesis and Sara, Eduardo and Jesús; Immunity Challenge: The winners of the Quickfire Challenge were given 60 minutes to prepare a tres leches cake. Each celebrity was randomly assigned an ingredient to add to their cake. The winner received immunity from elimination.: Eduardo (Red berries); Génesis (Ginger); Helen (Orange); Jesús (Cinnamon); Sara (Colombian coffee); Serrath (Chocolate); Winner: Eduardo
| 49 | 14 | "Inspirados en Oaxaca" | May 12, 2023 | 0.83 |
Duel of Captains: Team captains Eduardo and Laura were asked to prepare a prehispanic mole with the help of chef Abigail Mendoza Ruiz. The winner would get the first pick in choosing members of their team. However, the result was a tie and therefore a knife draw determined that Eduardo would get the first pick. Team Challenge: The teams were asked to prepare five servings of an appetizer and five of a main course, with the dishes being inspired by Oaxaca's gastronomy. The winning team received immunity from elimination.: Burgundy Team: Eduardo (C), Alana, Arturo, Génesis, Gilberto, Jesús, Jose, Sara, Sebastián; Blue Team: Laura (C), Gaby, Germán, Helen, Johnny, Juan Pablo, Marisol, Serrath, Tony; Winners: Laura, Gaby, Germán, Helen, Johnny, Juan Pablo, Marisol, Serrath, Tony
| 50 | 15 | "El último plato" | May 15, 2023 | 1.00 |
Johnny, winner of the Golden Knife, had to save two of the bottom entries. He decided to save Sebastián and Jose. Safety Challenge: The celebrities were challenged with preparing pork loin in 60 minutes. The pantry was open for the first twenty minutes. Afterwards, they had to incorporate a surprise ingredient into the dish every 10 minutes. The winner was safe from elimination.: Winner: Jesús; Elimination Challenge: The celebrities were given 60 minutes to cook any dish.: Winner: Génesis; Eliminated: Gilberto
| 51 | 16 | "A toda velocidad" | May 16, 2023 | 0.92 |
Team Challenge: The celebrities, in teams of four, participated in a Fast X-sponsored relay challenge. They had to prepare a dish inspired by a setting of the Fast & Furious franchise, with each team member being assigned a different task: garnish, preparing a sauce, cooking the protein, and plating the dish. Only the first two teams to complete their dish would be judged. The teams and countries were assigned via knife draw. The winning team advanced to the Immunity Challenge. Sebastián, who pulled a knife with the Fast X logo, did not have to compete and automatically advanced to the next challenge.: Brasil: Génesis, Germán, Juan Pablo, Laura; Los Angeles: Arturo, Eduardo, Jesús, Tony; Portugal: Alana, Johnny, Jose, Serrath; Rome: Gaby, Helen, Marisol, Sara; Winners: Arturo, Eduardo, Jesús, Tony; Immunity Challenge: The celebrities were asked to prepare a dish with coconut as the main ingredient. The winner received immunity from elimination.: Winner: Arturo
| 52 | 17 | "Platillos reciclados y tradicionales" | May 17, 2023 | 0.96 |
Team Challenge: The celebrities were challenged with preparing two dishes using only the ingredients found in the judges and host Carmen's refrigerator. A knife draw decided the order in which the teams picked a refrigerator. The winning team advanced to the Immunity Challenge.: Alana, Germán, Juan Pablo, Sara; Jose, Sebastían, Serrath, Tony; Gaby, Helen, Johnny, Marisol; Eduardo, Génesis, Jesús, Laura; Winners: Alana, Germán, Juan Pablo, Sara; Immunity Challenge: The celebrities were given 45 minutes to prepare a dish with huitlacoche as the main ingredient. The winner received immunity from elimination.: Winner: Alana
| 53 | 18 | "Clase magistral con la chef Adria" | May 18, 2023 | 0.86 |
Quickfire Challenge: The celebrities had to prepare a rice dish with a surprise ingredient. The celebrities were divided in groups of three and only the best dish of each group advanced to the Golden Knife challenge.: Black-eyed peas: Génesis, Helen, Serrath; Calamari rings: Alana, Sebastián, Tony; Chicken giblets: Eduardo, Germán, Laura; Mushrooms: Arturo, Jose, Sara; Pears: Jesús, Johnny, Juan Pablo; Winners: Génesis, Jose, Juan Pablo, Laura, Sebastián; Golden Knife Challenge: The celebrities were given 45 minutes to prepare any dish but could only use a spoon, knife, and a pan as their utensils. The winner received the Golden Knife.: Winner: Sebastián
| 54 | 19 | "A dominar el fuego" | May 19, 2023 | 0.76 |
Duel of Captains: Team captains Alana and Arturo were given 30 minutes to prepare three skewers. The winner would get the first pick in choosing members of their team.: Winner: Alana; Team Challenge: The teams were asked to prepare a family-style meal of four servings. The celebrities had to cook with firewood and charcoal. The winning team received immunity from elimination.: Burgundy Team: Alana (C), Eduardo, Germán, Jesús, Jose, Juan Pablo, Laura, Sebastián; Yellow Team: Arturo (C), Génesis, Helen, Johnny, Marisol, Sara, Serrath, Tony; Winners: Alana, Eduardo, Germán, Jesús, Jose, Juan Pablo, Laura, Sebastián
| 55 | 20 | "Armas de doble filo" | May 22, 2023 | 0.93 |
Sebastián, winner of the Golden Knife, had to save two of the bottom entries. He decided to save Johnny and Helen. Serrath was unable to participate in the challenges and Germán competed on her behalf. Safety Challenge: The celebrities were asked to prepare three churros. The winner was safe from elimination.: Winner: Marisol; Elimination Challenge: The celebrities were given 60 minutes to prepare a dish with an eggplant as the main ingredient. The judges decided not to eliminate anyone, as both Germán and Tony did poorly.
| 56 | 21 | "A la espera de un milagro" | May 23, 2023 | 0.77 |
Express Challenge: The celebrities were asked to prepare an omelette. The winners were named captains in the team challenge.: Winners: Jesús, Juan Pablo, Sebastián, Tony; Team Challenge: The celebrities were tested on their communication skills by playing a game of telephone with each other. The teams had to replicate an appetizer, main course, and dessert created by the judges using only their verbal and written descriptions as guidance. Each member of the team took a 15-minute turn in the kitchen and had two minutes to explain the recipes to the next member. The winning team received immunity from elimination.: Blue Team: Jesús (C), Germán, Eduardo, Marisol; Burgundy: Tony (C), Alana, Arturo, Johnny; Green Team: Sebastián (C), Génesis, Jose, Laura; Yellow Team: Juan Pablo (C), Helen, Sara, Serrath; Winners: Sebastián, Génesis, Jose, Laura
| 57 | 22 | "Mezclas insólitas" | May 24, 2023 | 0.95 |
Team Challenge: The celebrities, working in pairs, were given 60 minutes to make ice cream from scratch. The flavor of each pairs ice cream was assigned by a roulette wheel. The top three teams advanced to the Golden Knife Challenge.: Bacon: Génesis, Johnny; Black garlic: Eduardo, Jesús; Corn: Germán, Marisol; Ginger: Helen, Juan Pablo; Olive oil: Laura, Serrath; Rice pudding: Arturo, Sara; Tomato: Jose, Tony; Wasabi: Alana, Sebastián; Winners: Eduardo and Jesús, Helen and Juan Pablo, Alana and Sebastián; Golden Knife Challenge: In the final Golden Knife challenge, the celebrities were asked to prepare a dish fusing their own heritage with a country assigned by via knife draw. The winner received the Golden Knife.: France: Eduardo; Grecia: Helen; India: Alana; Japan: Juan Pablo; Spain: Jesús; Vietnam: Sebastián; Winner: Helen
| 58 | 23 | "Bajo presión" | May 25, 2023 | 0.87 |
The celebrities are informed that a surprise elimination challenge will take place. Helen, winner of the Golden Knife, had to save one of the bottom entries. She decided to save herself. Quickfire Challenge: The celebrities, working in groups assigned via knife draw, were given the same ingredients and had to prepare any dish using the ingredients provided. The pantry was closed. The top three groups were safe from elimination.: Alana, Arturo; Eduardo, Jesús; Germán, Johnny, Serrath; Juan Pablo, Tony; Marisol, Sara; Winners: Eduardo and Jesús, Marisol and Sara, Juan Pablo and Tony; Elimination Challenge: The celebrities were given 60 minutes to cook any dish.: Winner: Alana; Eliminated: Serrath
| 59 | 24 | "Fiesta de manteles largos" | May 26, 2023 | 0.77 |
Team Challenge: The celebrities catered two quinceañera parties (20 guests to be served per team). Each team prepared a different family style meal for each party. The teams were given 15 minutes to plan, and 75 minutes of preparation time. The winning team received immunity from elimination, while the losing team was sent to the elimination challenge.: Blue Team: Germán (C), Alana, Eduardo, Génesis, Helen, Jesús, Tony; Yellow Team: Laura (C), Arturo, Johnny, Jose, Juan Pablo, Marisol, Sara, Sebastián; Winners: Germán, Alana, Eduardo, Génesis, Helen, Jesús, Tony
| 60 | 25 | "Corazones desbocados" | May 29, 2023 | 0.87 |
Safety Challenge: The celebrities were given 60 minutes to prepare a tomahawk steak. The top three celebrities were safe from elimination.: Winners: Marisol, Juan Pablo, Arturo; Elimination Challenge: The celebrities were asked to prepare a dish that had to have garlic in it.: Winner: Sebastián; Eliminated: Johnny
| 61 | 26 | "Batalla por la capitanía" | May 30, 2023 | 0.87 |
Quickfire Challenge: The celebrities were allowed to choose their partners for the challenge. In a charades-like game, one partner was chosen to draw or act out the ingredients of a dish, while the other prepared the dish based on the indications given. The top three teams moved on to the next challenge.: Alana, Génesis; Arturo, Marisol; Eduardo, Tony; Germán, Laura; Helen, Jose; Juan Pablo, Sara; Jesús, Sebastián; Winners: Eduardo and Tony, Juan Pablo and Sara, Alana and Génesis; The celebrities were given 60 minutes to prepare a dish using the exotic protein assigned by a knife draw. The top three celebrities were named team captains for the next team challenge.: Beef udder: Alana; Brains: Génesis; Guinea pig: Eduardo; Kidney: Sara; Lung: Tony; Testicles: Juan Pablo; Winners: Sara, Juan Pablo, Génesis
| 62 | 27 | "A ciegas" | May 31, 2023 | 0.88 |
Team Challenge: The celebrities competed in the Black Box challenge. After entering the black box, which covered the celebrities in total darkness, each team had three minutes to taste, smell, and feel a mystery dish. Afterwards, the teams had 45 minutes to recreate the dish. The winning team advanced to the immunity challenge.: Green Team: Juan Pablo (C), Alana, Arturo, Jesús, Laura; Burgundy Team: Génesis (C), Helen, Marisol, Sebastián, Tony; Yellow Team: Sara (C), Eduardo, Germán, Jose; Winners: Juan Pablo, Alana, Arturo, Jesús, Laura; Immunity Challenge: The celebrities were given 45 minutes to prepare three snacks. The snacks had to be served in the serving dishes chosen by the judges. The winner received immunity from elimination.: Winner: Laura
| 63 | 28 | "En la trattoria" | June 1, 2023 | 0.83 |
Quickfire Challenge: The celebrities were given 60 minutes to prepare a dish from Italy. Guest judge Simone Mua picked the top eight dishes for the judges to taste. Afterwards, the top four celebrities moved on to the immunity challenge.: Winners: Génesis, Marisol, Sara, Sebastián; Immunity Challenge: The celebrities were challenged with preparing a dish using only the ingredients that the judges and host Carmen picked from the pantry. The winner received immunity from elimination.: Winner: Sebastián
| 64 | 29 | "Manos a la ubre" | June 2, 2023 | 0.72 |
Duel of Captains: Team captains Laura and Sebastián were asked to milk a cow and make cheese with it. They had 3 minutes to milk the cow and 60 minutes to prepare the cheese. The winner would get the first pick in choosing members of their team.: Winner: Laura; Team Challenge: The teams were given 45 minutes to prepare a beef or pork dish using ingredients that are grown on a farm. The winning team received immunity from elimination, while the losing team was sent to the elimination challenge.: Burgundy Team: Laura (C), Alana, Génesis, Germán, Helen, Jésus, Sara; Blue Team: Sebastián (C), Arturo, Eduardo, Jose, Juan Pablo, Marisol, Tony; Winners: Laura, Alana, Génesis, Germán, Helen, Jésus, Sara
| 65 | 30 | "Palpitaciones alteradas" | June 5, 2023 | 0.87 |
Safety Challenge: The celebrities were randomly assigned the heart of a different ingredient and had 45 minutes to prepare their dish. The winner was safe from elimination.: Artichoke: Juan Pablo; Cow: Marisol; Chicken: Eduardo; Heart of palm: Tony; Lamb: Jose; Pork: Arturo; Winner: Eduardo; Elimination Challenge: The celebrities were given 60 minutes to prepare any dish.: Eliminated: Tony
| 66 | 31 | "Un muro entre nosotros" | June 6, 2023 | 0.75 |
Quickfire Challenge: The celebrities had to prepare a dish while simultaneously giving instructions to their partner, hidden behind a wall, on how to cook the same dish. The partners were assigned via knife draw. The dishes had to resemble each other in taste and presentation. The winners advanced to the immunity challenge. Due to the odd number of competitors, Eduardo pulled a special knife that allowed him to automatically advance to the immunity challenge.: Alana, Jesús; Arturo, Marisol; Génesis, Sara; Germán, Sebastián; Helen, Jose; Juan Pablo, Laura; Winners: Juan Pablo and Laura, Alana and Jesús; Immunity Challenge: The celebrities were given two hours to prepare cake and had to use fondant for decoration. The winner received immunity from elimination.: Winner: Jesús
| 67 | 32 | "La unión hace la fuerza" | June 7, 2023 | 0.74 |
Quickfire Challenge: The celebrities worked in pairs to prepare a dish inspired by a proverb. The pairs and proverb were assigned via envelopes. The winners became captains in the team challenge.: Alana, Germán; Arturo, Juan Pablo; Eduardo, Génesis; Helen, Sara; Jose, Sebastián; Laura, Marisol; Winners: Eduardo and Génesis, Laura and Marisol; Team Challenge: The celebrities were challenged with preparing a steak tartare, a seafood tartare, and a vegetable tartare. The winning team received immunity from elimination.: Blue Team: Eduardo (C), Sara, Arturo; Burgundy Team: Marisol (C), Germán, Helen; Green Team: Génesis (C), Alana, Jose; Yellow Team: Laura (C), Sebastián, Juan Pablo; Winners: Eduardo, Sara, Arturo
| 68 | 33 | "Los espejos del chef" | June 8, 2023 | 0.82 |
Safety Challenge: The celebrities were challenged with preparing chef Benito Molina's seafood dish while following along his instructions. The top four celebrities were safe from elimination.: Winners: Marisol, Génesis, Alana, Juan Pablo; Elimination Challenge: The celebrities were given 45 minutes to prepare a dish that honored their roots.: Eliminated: Jose
| 69 | 34 | "Un chin de fritura tradicional" | June 9, 2023 | 0.66 |
The celebrities working in teams, were given 45 minutes to prepare a Picalonga dish. The winning team had the advantage of choosing three more celebrities to join their team in the team challenge.: Alana, Jesús, Sebastián; Arturo, Génesis, Helen; Eduardo, Germán, Sara; Juan Pablo, Laura, Marisol; Winners: Alana, Jesús, Sebastián; Team Challenge: The teams were asked to prepare a two-course meal, with the dishes being inspired by the Dominican Republic's gastronomy. The winning team received immunity from elimination. Chef María Marte helped judge the dishes.: Blue Team: Alana, Eduardo, Génesis, Jesús, Juan Pablo, Sebastián; Burgundy Team: Arturo, Germán, Helen, Laura, Marisol, Sara; Winners: Arturo, Germán, Helen, Laura, Marisol, Sara
| 70 | 35 | "No todo es cuestión de suerte" | June 12, 2023 | 0.86 |
Safety Challenge: The celebrities were given 60 minutes to prepare a dish that was randomly assigned by a slot machine. The slot machine assigned a protein, sauce, side dish, and number of identical dishes. The winners were safe from elimination.: Winners: Alana, Génesis; Elimination Challenge: The celebrities were asked to prepare a comfort food dish.: Eliminated: Eduardo
| 71 | 36 | "Arte culinario, risas y hasta boda" | June 13, 2023 | 0.82 |
Quickfire Challenge: The celebrities, working in teams, were given 60 minutes to cook any dish. Each team received help from a contestant from season one. The blue team was assisted by Héctor Suárez Gomís, the burgundy team was assisted by Chiky Bom Bom, the green team was assisted by Rodrigo Vidal, and the yellow team was assisted by Gregorio Pernía. The top two teams advanced to the immunity challenge.: Blue: Germán, Helen, Jesús; Burgundy: Arturo, Laura; Green: Alana, Génesis, Sebastián; Yellow: Juan Pablo, Sara; Winners: Alana, Génesis, Sebastián and Juan Pablo, Sara; Elimination Challenge: The celebrities were asked to prepare a vegetarian dish. Each celebrity once again received help from season one competitors. Gregorio assisted both Juan Pablo and Sara, Chiky assisted Génesis, Rodrigo assisted Sebastián, and Héctor assisted Alana. The winners received immunity from elimination.: Winners: Génesis, Sara
| 72 | 37 | "Verbena mexicana" | June 14, 2023 | 0.93 |
Team Challenge: The celebrities, working in pairs, were asked to prepare three different tostadas. Once again, season one competitors returned to assist the teams. Gregorio assisted the blue team, Rodrigo assisted the burgundy team, Héctor assisted the green team, and Chiky assisted the yellow team. The winning pair won two advantages for the safety challenge.: Blue Team: Germán, Juan Pablo; Burgundy Team: Arturo, Laura; Green Team: Alana, Sebastián; Yellow Team: Helen, Jesús; Winners: Alana, Sebastián; Safety Challenge: The celebrities, working in pairs, were challenged with preparing a dish using insects as the main ingredient, with Alana and Sebastián deciding the teams and their insects.: Tantarias and crickets: Alana, Sebastián; Escamol and Jumiles: Arturo, Germán; Jumiles and Maguey worms: Helen, Laura; Chicatana ants and Mezcal worms: Jesús, Juan Pablo; Winners: Alana, Sebastián
| 73 | 38 | "Un reto Elemental" | June 15, 2023 | 0.80 |
The bottom six celebrities competed in an Elemental-sponsored challenge, where they had to prepare a dish that combined different ingredients that represented the elements of nature. The winner was safe from elimination.: Winner: Helen; Elimination Challenge: The celebrities were asked to prepare a dish that can be paired with tequila.: Eliminated: Jesús
| 74 | 39 | "Tirantez en el viñedo" | June 16, 2023 | 0.90 |
The celebrities were given 30 minutes to prepare sangria. The top five celebrities formed one team in the team challenge and the remaining celebrities formed the second team.: Winners: Juan Pablo, Arturo, Laura, Sara, Sebastián; Team Challenge: The teams were asked to prepare a paella dish for fifty guests. The celebrities had 90 minutes of preparation time. The winning team received immunity from elimination.: Burgundy Team: Arturo, Juan Pablo, Laura, Sara, Sebastián; Green Team: Alana, Génesis, Germán, Helen; Winners: Arturo, Juan Pablo, Laura, Sara, Sebastián
| 75 | 40 | "Al cuadrilátero" | June 19, 2023 | 0.88 |
Safety Challenge: They celebrities were asked to prepare a breakfast dish. The winner was safe from elimination.: Winner: Germán; Elimination Challenge: The celebrities were given 60 minutes to cook any dish.: Winners: Alana and Génesis; Eliminated: Helen
| 76 | 41 | "Copiar al experto" | June 20, 2023 | 0.90 |
Quickfire Challenge: Top Chef VIP season one winner Lambda García returned and the celebrities were challenged with replicating one of his dishes. The winners advanced to the immunity challenge.: Winners: Alana, Germán, Juan Pablo, Sebastián; Immunity Challenge: Inspired by the 2023 FIFA Women's World Cup in Australia and New Zealand, the celebrities in teams of three were asked to prepare a Pavlova. The winner received immunity from elimination.: Winner: Germán
| 77 | 42 | "Aperitivo locochón" | June 21, 2023 | 0.85 |
Quickfire Challenge: The celebrities were asked to prepare four different snacks, all served on top of a cracker, for a Ritz Crackers-sponsored challenge. The winners became captains in the team challenge.: Winners: Alana and Juan Pablo; Team Challenge: The teams were given 60 minutes to prepare two servings of three different recipes, for a total of six dishes per team. From those six dishes the team captains had to choose only one to present to the judges. Germán is safe from elimination, but still had to participate in the challenge. The winners received immunity from elimination.: Blue Team: Germán (C), Marisol, Laura; Burgundy Team: Juan Pablo (C), Sara, Génesis; Yellow Team: Alana (C), Sebastián, Arturo; Winners: Alana, Sebastián, Arturo
| 78 | 43 | "Orientación de lujo" | June 22, 2023 | 0.90 |
Safety Challenge: Pastry chef Jordi Roca visited the Top Chef VIP kitchen and the bottom five celebrities were challenged with replicating one of his desserts. The winner was safe from elimination.: Winner: Juan Pablo; Elimination Challenge: The celebrities were asked to prepare a chile rellenos dish.: Eliminated: Marisol
| 79 | 44 | "Lucha callejera" | June 23, 2023 | 0.83 |
Express Challenge: The celebrities were given 20 minutes to prepare a sauce. The top two celebrities became captains in the team challenge.: Winners: Juan Pablo and Alana; Restaurant Wars Challenge: The celebrities competed in Top Chef's traditional Restaurant Wars challenge. The celebrities were split into two teams and were responsible for running a food truck. The teams were given 90 minutes to prepare a dish for twenty guests. The winning team received immunity from elimination.: Blue Team: Alana (C), Génesis, Laura, Sebastián; Green Team: Juan Pablo (C), Arturo, Germán, Sara; Winners: Alana, Génesis, Laura, Sebastián
| 80 | 45 | "Salvación con sabor a mar" | June 26, 2023 | 0.95 |
Safety Challenge: The celebrities were asked to prepare a shrimp dish. The winner was safe from elimination.: Winner: Germán; Elimination Challenge: The celebrities were given 60 minutes to prepare an empanada and a sauce.: Eliminated: Juan Pablo
| 81 | 46 | "Sabor a familia" | June 27, 2023 | 0.89 |
Quickfire Challenge: The celebrities were given 60 minutes to prepare an appetizer and a main course. They received help from their family members. The top four celebrities advanced to the immunity challenge.: Winners: Arturo, Alana, Génesis, Germán; Immunity Challenge: The celebrities were asked to prepare a dish that represents their astrological sign.: Winner: Génesis
| 82 | 47 | "Ni visitas, ni consejos" | June 28, 2023 | 0.86 |
Quickfire Challenge: The celebrities were given 60 minutes to cook any dish. The judges tasted the dishes without knowing who cooked them. The winner received an advantage in the team challenge.: Winner: Alana; Team Challenge: The celebrities were asked to prepare a dish using beef tongue. Alana had the advantage of deciding the teams. The winning team received immunity from elimination.: Blue Team: Alana, Sara; Green Team: Arturo, Germán; Yellow Team: Laura, Sebastián; Winners: Arturo and Germán
| 83 | 48 | "El reto más amargo" | June 29, 2023 | 0.93 |
Safety Challenge: The celebrities were challenged with preparing a dish that combined chocolate with two different ingredients. Chef José Ramón Castillo was the guest judge. The winner was safe from elimination.: Alana: Coriander and ginger; Laura: Orange and cardamom; Sara: Habanero and white pepper; Sebastián: Lavender and mushrooms; Winner: Laura; Elimination Challenge: Alana, Sara and Sebastián were asked to prepare a Spanish omelette.: Eliminated: Sara
| 84 | 49 | "Reencuentro en Cartagena" | June 30, 2023 | 0.91 |
Quickfire Challenge Ten of the previously eliminated celebrities competed against each other for a chance to re-enter the competition. They were given 60 minutes to prepare a dish inspired by Cartagena's gastronomy: Winners: Helen and Jesús; Team Challenge: The celebrities were given 60 minutes to prepare a seafood meal consisting of an appetizer and a main course. Returnees Helen and Jesús are named team captains. A knife draw determined Jesús would get first pick in choosing members of his team and which proteins to use for their dishes.: Burgundy Team: Helen (C), Arturo, Génesis, Germán; Appetizer: Squid; Main course: Octopus; Green Team: Jesús (C), Alana, Laura, Sebastián; Appetizer: Crab; Main course: Lobster; Winners: Jesús, Alana, Laura, Sebastián
| 85 | 50 | "Honrosa despedida" | July 3, 2023 | 0.89 |
Safety Challenge: The celebrities were given 60 minutes to prepare any dish but the total weight of their ingredients had to be less than four pounds. Each celebrity was given three minutes to shop in the pantry.: Winner: Arturo; Elimination Challenge: The celebrities were asked to prepare a dish with mushrooms as the main ingredient.: Winner: Germán; Eliminated: Helen
| 86 | 51 | "Feliz Día de la Independencia" | July 4, 2023 | 0.61 |
Quickfire Challenge: The celebrities, working in teams, were asked to prepare an American family-style barbecue meal. The judges decided that both teams passed the challenge and both advanced to the immunity challenge.: Blue Team: Alana, Arturo, Jesús, Sebastián; Burgundy Team: Génesis, Germán, Laura; Immunity Challenge: The celebrities were given 60 minutes to prepare a hamburger with a side dish and sauce. The winner received immunity from elimination.: Winner: Sebastián
| 87 | 52 | "Pelea por la salvación" | July 5, 2023 | 0.84 |
Quickfire Challenge: The celebrities were challenged with preparing street food from the country of their choosing. The winner received an advantage in the immunity challenge.: Colombia: Germán (Arepa); Italy: Génesis (Arancini); Japan: Laura (Sushi); Mexico: Jesús (Quesadilla); Peru: Arturo (Picarones); Spain: Alana (Spanish Croquette); Winner: Arturo; Immunity Challenge The celebrities, working in pairs, were asked to prepare three identical cupcakes. Arturo had the advantage of deciding the pairs. The winning pair received immunity from elimination.: Green Team: Alana, Germán; Orange Team: Arturo, Laura; Red Team: Génesis, Jesús; Winners: Alana and Germán
| 88 | 53 | "Cuatro celebridades están en riesgo" | July 6, 2023 | 0.90 |
Safety Challenge: The celebrities were asked to prepare a chorizo dish from scratch. The winner was safe from elimination.: Winner: Arturo; Elimination Challenge: The celebrities were given 45 minutes to cook any dish.: Eliminated: Génesis
| 89 | 54 | "Comienza la recta final" | July 7, 2023 | 0.85 |
Quickfire Challenge: The top six celebrities were asked to prepare fried chicken. The required pieces were a leg, wing, thigh, and breast. The top three celebrities advanced to the Semifinal Qualifying Challenge.: Winners: Alana, Germán, Jesús; Semifinal Qualification Challenge: Alana, Germán, and Jesús were challenged with preparing a Tex-Mex dish, assigned via knife draw, in 45 minutes. The winner advanced to the semifinal.: Burritos: Alana; Chili con carne: Jesús; Flautas: Germán; Winner: Alana
| 90 | 55 | "Con un toque personal" | July 10, 2023 | 0.97 |
Quickfire Challenge: The celebrities received a class from Chef Betty Vázquez on cooking techniques with fish. Afterwards, they were asked to cook a dish inspired by one of the dishes prepared by Chef Betty. The top three celebrities advanced to the Semifinal Qualifying Challenge.: Winners: Germán, Jesús, Laura; Semifinal Qualification Challenge: Germán, Jesús, and Laura were given 60 minutes to prepare a soup of three servings. The winner advanced to the semifinal.: Winner: Germán
| 91 | 56 | "Llueven las críticas" | July 11, 2023 | 0.88 |
Quickfire Challenge: Arturo, Germán, Jesús, and Laura were given 60 minutes to prepare any dish. Each of them received help from a guest chef. Arturo was assisted by Tania García, Jesús was assisted by Lula Martin Del Campo, Laura was assisted by Jacobo García, and Sebastián was assisted by Fabián Delgado. The top three celebrities advanced to the Semifinal Qualifying Challenge.: Winners: Arturo, Germán, Laura; Semifinal Qualification Challenge: Arturo, Germán, and Laura were challenged with preparing a dish using cauliflower as the main ingredient. The winner advanced to the semifinal.: Winner: Laura
| 92 | 57 | "A cuentagotas" | July 12, 2023 | 0.87 |
Quickfire Challenge: Arturo, Jesús, and Sebastián were asked to prepare a dish using beans as the main ingredient. Each of them received help from a semifinalist. Arturo was assisted by Germán, Jesús was assisted by Alana, and Sebastián was assisted by Laura. The top two celebrities advanced to the Semifinal Qualifying Challenge.: Winners: Jesús, Sebastián; Semifinal Qualification Challenge: Jesús and Sebastián were challenged with reinventing one of their worst dishes from the competition. The winner advanced to the semifinal.: Winner: Sebastián; Elimination Challenge: Arturo and Jesús were given 45 minutes to cook any dish.: Winner: Jesús; Eliminated: Arturo
| 93 | 58 | "El primer pase de la semifinal" | July 13, 2023 | 1.00 |
Semifinal: The top 5 celebrities were asked to prepare a dish inspired by Yucatán's gastronomy. Each celebrity had to present two servings of the same dish, one for the judges and another for the guest judges. The assignment of the dishes and cooking order was based on who qualified for the semifinal first. The winner advanced to the finale.: Stuffed cheese: Alana; Cochinita pibil: Germán; Relleno negro: Laura; Papadzules: Sebastián; Poc chuc: Jesús; Winner: Sebastián
| 94 | 59 | "Listos para la final" | July 14, 2023 | 0.92 |
Semifinal: The celebrities were given 60 minutes to prepare six servings of a dish that used ingredients from Yucatan cuisine. A random draw determined the cooking and presentation order. Season one finalists Mauricio, Zuleyka and Cristina helped judge the dishes. The top four celebrities advanced to the finale.: Eliminated: Jesús
| 95 | 60 | "La última batalla" | July 17, 2023 | 1.09 |
Finale: Alana, Germán, Laura and Sebastián were given two hours to prepare a three-course meal that included an appetizer, the main course, and a dessert.: Winner: Alana; Runners-up: Germán, Laura, Sebastián
