= Top Chef VIP season 3 =

Top Chef VIP
- Season 3
- Hosted by: Carmen Villalobos
- Judges: Antonio de Livier; Belén Alonso; Inés Páez Nin
- No. of contestants: 21
- Winner: Patricia Navidad
- No. of episodes: 60

Release
- Original network: Telemundo
- Original release: May 21 – July 29, 2024

Season chronology
- ← Previous; Season 2 Next → Season 4

The third season of the American competitive reality television series Top Chef VIP premiered on Telemundo on May 21, 2024. The season was announced on July 18, 2023. Carmen Villalobos returned as host. Antonio de Livier is the only judge to return from previous seasons. Belén Alonso and Inés Páez Nin replaced Adria Marina Montaño and Juan Manuel Barrientos as judges.

The season was won by Patricia Navidad, who received US$200,000, double the prize awarded in previous seasons.

== Contestants ==
Twenty celebrities were initially selected to compete in Top Chef VIP. Following Mark Tacher's withdrawal, Gabriel Coronel was selected as his replacement.

Name	Age	Hometown	Notability
Alejandro López	56	Bogotá, Colombia	Actor
Alicia Machado	47	Maracay, Venezuela	Actress & Miss Universe 1996
Carolina Tejera	47	Caracas, Venezuela	Actress
Daniela Castro	54	Mexico City, Mexico	Actress
Danka Castro	20	Mexico	Actress
David Salomón	45	Quintana Roo, Mexico	Fashion designer
Diana Reyes	44	La Paz, Mexico	Singer
Gabriel Coronel	37	Barquisimeto, Venezuela	Actor & singer
Gary Centeno	37	San Carlos, Costa Rica	Actor
Ivanna Jiménez	18	Mexico	Singer
Jason Romo	27	Mexico	Actor
José Luis "El Puma" Rodríguez	81	Caracas, Venezuela	Singer and actor
José María Galeano	44	Algeciras, Spain	Actor
Mariana Botas	34	Mexico City, Mexico	Actress
Mark Tacher	46	Mexico City, Mexico	Actor
Natalia Juárez	29	Mexico City, Mexico	Actress
Pancho Uresti	29	Nuevo Laredo, Mexico	Singer
Patricia Navidad	51	Culiacán, Mexico	Actress and singer
Polo Morín	33	Celaya, Mexico	Actor
Rosie Rivera	42	Long Beach, California	TV personality
Víctor Florencio "El Niño Prodigio"	41	Dominican Republic	Astrologer

== Contestant progress ==
Episode #		1		2		3		4			5	6		7		8		9		10		11		12		13		14		15		16		17	18		19		20	21			22		23		24		25		26		27		28		29	30		31		32		33		34		35	36		37		38		39		40		41	42		43		44		45		46^{2}		47	48		49		50		51		52		53		54		55		56		57			58	59	60
1	Paty	IN	—	WIN	HIGH	WIN	IN	—	—	—	—	—	—	—	—	WIN	WIN	IMM	IMM	WIN	IN	WIN	IMM	IMM	IMM	IN	—	WIN	IMM	IMM	IMM	IN	—	WIN	IMM	IMM	IN	—	WIN	IN	WIN	IMM	IN	WIN	IMM	IMM	IMM	IMM	WIN	IN	IN	WIN	IMM	IMM	WIN	HIGH	WIN	WIN	IN	WIN	IN	WIN	IMM	IMM	IMM	WIN	WIN	IMM	IMM	IMM	IN	—	IN	IN	WIN	WIN	IMM	IMM	IMM	IMM	IMM	WIN	IN	WIN	IMM	IMM	IMM	IMM	IMM	WIN	IMM	IMM	WIN	IN	WIN	IMM	IMM	IMM	WIN	HIGH	WIN	IMM	WIN	IN	WIN	WIN	IMM	IMM	IMM	IMM	IMM	WIN	IMM	WINNER
2	David	WIN	IN	WIN	HIGH	WIN	HIGH	WIN	IN	—	WIN	IMM	IMM	WIN	IN	WIN	WIN	IMM	IMM	WIN	IN	IN	WIN	IMM	IMM	WIN	IN	IN	WIN	IMM	IMM	WIN	IN	LOW	WIN	IMM	WIN	IN	IN	IN	WIN	IMM	IN	IN	WIN	WIN	IMM	IMM	IN	—	WIN	IMM	IMM	IMM	WIN	IN	WIN	IN	—	WIN	WIN	IMM	IMM	IMM	IMM	WIN	IN	LOW	IN	IN	WIN	HIGH	WIN	IMM	WIN	IN	WIN	IN	WIN	IMM	IMM	IN	—	HIGH	IN	WIN	IMM	IMM	IMM	WIN	IMM	IMM	WIN	WIN	IMM	IMM	IMM	IMM	IN	—	IN	IN	WIN	WIN	IMM	IMM	IMM	IMM	IMM	IMM	IMM	IN	WIN	RUNNER-UP
2	José María	WIN	IN	IN	—	WIN	WIN	IMM	IMM	IMM	IMM	IMM	IMM	IN	—	WIN	WIN	IMM	IMM	LOW	—	WIN	IMM	IMM	IMM	WIN	—	IN	WIN	IMM	IMM	IN	—	LOW	IN	LOW	WIN	IN	IN	IN	IN	WIN	IN	IN	WIN	WIN	IMM	IMM	WIN	IN	IN	IN	IN	IN	WIN	IN	WIN	IN	—	IN	—	WIN	IMM	IMM	IMM	IN	—	WIN	IMM	IMM	IN	—	IN	WIN	IN	—	WIN	WIN	IMM	IMM	IMM	IN	—	IN	IN	IN	LOW	IMM	IMM	IN	IN	IN	WIN	IN	IN	IN	IN	WIN	WIN	IN	IN	IN	WIN	IN	WIN	IN	WIN	IN	WIN	IMM	IMM	IN	WIN	RUNNER-UP
2	Niño	IN	—	IN	—	WIN	HIGH	WIN	IN	—	WIN	IMM	IMM	WIN	IN	LOW	—	WIN	IMM	LOW	—	IN	IN	WIN	IMM	WIN	WIN	IMM	IMM	IMM	IMM	IN	—	LOW	IN	IN	IN	—	IN	WIN	IMM	IMM	IN	IN	WIN	WIN	IMM	IMM	IN	—	IN	IN	WIN	IMM	IN	—	WIN	IN	—	IN	—	IN	IN	WIN	IMM	WIN	IN	WIN	IMM	IMM	IN	—	WIN	IMM	IN	—	WIN	IN	WIN	IMM	IMM	WIN	IN	IN	IN	IN	LOW	IMM	IMM	WIN	IMM	IMM	WIN	IN	WIN	IMM	IMM	IMM	WIN	WIN	IMM	IMM	IN	—	WIN	IN	IN	—	IN	IN	WIN	IN	WIN	RUNNER-UP
5	Gary	IN	—	IN	—	WIN	HIGH	IN	WIN	IN	LOW	IN	WIN	WIN	WIN	IMM	IMM	IMM	IMM	WIN	WIN	IMM	IMM	IMM	IMM	IN	HIGH	IN	LOW	WIN	IMM	IN	—	WIN	IMM	IMM	WIN	IN	IN	WIN	IMM	IMM	IN	IN	WIN	WIN	IMM	IMM	WIN	WIN	IMM	IMM	IMM	IMM	IN	—	WIN	WIN	WIN	IMM	IMM	IMM	IMM	IMM	IMM	—	—	—	—	—	IN	—	WIN	IMM	IN	—	IN	—	LOW	IN	WIN	WIN	WIN	IMM	IMM	IMM	IMM	IMM	IMM	IN	IN	IN	WIN	IN	IN	IN	IN	LOW	IN	—	IN	IN	IN	—	IN	—	WIN	IN	IN	WIN	IMM	IN	OUT	
5	Natalia	WIN	WIN	IMM	IMM	IMM	IMM	IMM	IMM	IMM	IMM	IMM	IMM	IN	—	LOW	—	WIN	IMM	WIN	IN	WIN	IMM	IMM	IMM	WIN	IN	HIGH	LOW	IN	LOW	IN	—	WIN	IMM	IMM	IN	—	IN	IN	IN	IN	IN	IN	IN	LOW	IN	OUT																																								WIN	IMM	IN	WIN	IMM	WIN	HIGH	IN	IN	WIN	IMM	IN	—	WIN	IMM	IN	—	IN	—	WIN	WIN	IMM	IMM	IMM	IN	OUT	
7	Alicia	WIN	IN	IN	—	IN	—	IN	IN	—	WIN	IN	WIN	WIN	—	LOW	—	IN	LOW	WIN	IN	IMM	IMM	IMM	IMM	IN	—	HIGH	LOW	IN	WIN	WIN	IN	LOW	IN	WIN	WIN	IN	IN	IN	IMM	IMM	IN	IN	WIN	WIN	IMM	IMM	IN	—	—	IN	IN	LOW	IN	—	WIN	IN	—	IN	—	IN	IN	IN	IN	IN	—	LOW	WIN	IMM	WIN	WIN	IMM	IMM	IN	—	IN	—	WIN	IMM	IMM	IN	—	HIGH	WIN	IMM	IMM	IMM	IMM	IN	WIN	IMM	IN	—	IN	WIN	IMM	IMM	IN	—	IN	IN	IN	—	IN	—	IN	—	IN	IN	OUT			
8	Carolina	IN	—	WIN	WIN	IMM	IMM	IMM	IMM	IMM	IMM	IMM	IMM	IN	—	WIN	WIN	IMM	IMM	LOW	—	IN	IN	IN	IN	IN	—	IN	WIN	IMM	IMM	WIN	IN	LOW	WIN	IMM	IN	—	IN	WIN	IMM	IMM	IN	IN	IN	LOW	WIN	IMM	WIN	IN	IN	IN	IN	LOW	IN	—	WIN	WIN	IN	WIN	IN	IN	IN	IN	IN	WIN	IN	LOW	IN	IN	WIN	IN	IN	LOW	WIN	IN	IN	—	WIN	IMM	IMM	IN	—	IN	IN	IN	WIN	IMM	IMM	WIN	IMM	IMM	IN	—	IN	HIGH	WIN	IMM	WIN	IN	IN	OUT												
9	Gabriel															WIN	WIN	IMM	IMM	WIN	IN	IN	IN	IN	IN	IN	—	IN	LOW	IN	IN	IN	—	WIN	IMM	IMM	WIN	IN	IN	WIN	IMM	IMM	IN	IN	IN	LOW	IN	IN	IN	—	IN	IN	IN	IN	WIN	WIN	WIN	WIN	IN	IN	—	IN	IN	IN	IN	IN	—	WIN	IMM	IMM	WIN	IN	IN	IN	WIN	IN	IN	—	LOW	WIN	IMM	WIN	IN	IN	IN	IN	IN	IMM	IMM	IN	IN	IN	IN	—	IN	IN	IN	OUT																
10	Mariana	IN	—	WIN	IN	IN	—	—	—	—	LOW	IN	LOW	IN	—	WIN	IN	IN	OUT																																																																	IN	WIN	IN	IN	OUT																										
11	Pancho	IN	—	IN	—	WIN	IN	IN	WIN	IN	WIN	IMM	IMM	WIN	IN	WIN	IN	IN	LOW	LOW	—	IN	IN	IN	LOW	IN	—	HIGH	WIN	IMM	IMM	—	—	LOW	IN	IN	IN	—	IN	WIN	IMM	IMM	IN	IN	IN	LOW	WIN	IMM	IMM	IN	IN	IN	IN	IN	IN	—	WIN	IN	—	WIN	IN	IN	IN	WIN	IMM	IN	—	WIN	IMM	IMM	IN	—	WIN	IMM	WIN	IN	WIN	IN	LOW	IN	LOW	WIN	IN	IN	IN	IN	OUT	IN	HIGH																									
12	Jason	IN	—	IN	—	IN	—	WIN	WIN	WIN	IMM	IMM	IMM	WIN	IN	LOW	—	IN	IN	LOW	—	IN	IN	IN	IN	IN	—	WIN	IMM	IMM	IMM	WIN	IN	WIN	IMM	IMM	IN	—	IN	IN	IN	LOW	WIN	IN	IN	LOW	IN	LOW	IN	—	IMM	IMM	IMM	IMM	IN	—	WIN	WIN	IN	IN	—	IN	WIN	IMM	IMM	WIN	IN	WIN	IMM	IMM	WIN	IN	WIN	IMM	IN	—	WIN	IN	LOW	IN	OUT							HIGH	IN																									
13	Polo	IN	—	IN	—	IN	—	IN	IN	—	LOW	IN	LOW	IN	—	WIN	WIN	IMM	IMM	WIN	IN	WIN	IMM	IMM	IMM	WIN	IN	IN	LOW	WIN	IMM	WIN	WIN	IMM	IMM	IMM	IN	—	IN	IN	IN	WIN	IN	IN	WIN	WIN	IMM	IMM	IN	—	IN	IN	WIN	IMM	WIN	IN	WIN	IN	—	WIN	IN	IN	WIN	IMM	IMM	WIN	IN	LOW	IN	IN	IN	—	IN	OUT														HIGH	IN																									
14	Rosie	IN	—	WIN	IN	IN	—	IN	IN	—	—	—	—	—	—	WIN	IN	IN	IN	LOW	—	IN	WIN	IMM	IMM	IN	—	HIGH	LOW	IN	WIN	IN	—	WIN	IMM	IMM	IN	—	IN	WIN	IMM	IMM	IN	IN	IN	LOW	IN	WIN	IN	—	IN	WIN	IMM	IMM	WIN	IN	WIN	IN	—	WIN	IN	IN	IN	IN	OUT																							IN	IN																									
15	Puma	IN	—	WIN	IN	DSQ	—	IN	IN	—	WIN	IMM	IMM	WIN	—	WIN	WIN	IMM	IMM	WIN	IN	IN	HIGH	WIN	IMM	IN	—	IN	WIN	IMM	IMM	IN	—	IMM	IMM	IMM	WIN	WIN	IMM	IMM	IMM	IMM	IN	IN	IN	LOW	IN	IN	IN	—	IN	IN	IN	OUT																																																												
16	Diana	IN	—	IN	—	IN	—	IN	WIN	IN	LOW	IN	LOW	WIN	—	LOW	—	IN	WIN	LOW	—	IN	WIN	IMM	IMM	IN	—	IN	WIN	IMM	IMM	IN	—	WIN	IMM	IMM	IN	—	WIN	IN	IN	OUT																																														HIGH	IN																									
17	Alejandro	IN	—	—	—	WIN	IN	IN	IN	—	IMM	IMM	IMM	WIN	—	WIN	WIN	IMM	IMM	LOW	—	IN	IN	WIN	IMM	IN	—	IN	WIN	IMM	IMM	IN	—	LOW	IN	OUT																																																				IN	IN																									
18	Danka	IN	—	IN	—	IN	—	IN	IN	—	—	IN	WIN	WIN	—	LOW	—	WIN	IMM	LOW	—	IN	HIGH	IN	LOW	IN	—	IN	LOW	IN	OUT																																																																																			
19	Ivanna	IN	—	IN	—	IN	—	IN	IN	—	LOW	WIN	IMM	IN	—	WIN	IN	WIN	IMM	WIN	IN	IN	HIGH	IN	OUT																																																															IN	IN																									
20	Daniela	IN	—	IN	—	WIN	IN	—	—	—	LOW	IN	OUT																																																																																																					
21	Mark	IN	—	IN	—	WIN	—	WDR^{1}																																																																																																										

^Note 1: Mark decided to withdraw from the competition for unknown reasons.
^Note 2: In this episode, eliminated contestants competed for a chance to re-enter the competition. Natalia and Mariana won the challenges and rejoined the competition.

(WINNER) The chef won the season and was crowned "Top Chef".
(RUNNER-UP) The chef was a runner-up for the season.
(WIN) The celebrity won the Quickfire Challenge, Immunity Challenge, Safety Challenge, or Elimination Challenge.
(WIN) The celebrity was on the winning team in the Team Challenge and directly advanced to the next round.
(HIGH) The celebrity was selected as one of the top entries in an individual or team challenge, but did not win.
(IN) The celebrity was not selected as one of the top or bottom entries in an individual challenge and was safe.
(IN) The celebrity was not selected as a top or bottom entry in a Team Challenge.
(IMM) The celebrity didn't have to compete in that round of the competition and was safe from elimination.
(IMM) The celebrity had to compete in that round of the competition but was safe from elimination.
(—) The celebrity did not quality for a challenge.
(—) The celebrity was unable to participate due to personal reasons.
(LOW) The celebrity was selected as one of the bottom entries in the Elimination Challenge, but was not eliminated.
(LOW) The celebrity was one of the bottom entries in a Team Challenge.
(DSQ) The celebrity was disqualified from a challenge.
(OUT) The celebrity lost the Elimination Challenge.
(WDR) The celebrity voluntarily withdrew from the competition.

== Episodes ==
No. overall	No. in season	Title	Original release date	US viewers (millions)
96	1	"La cocina abre sus puertas"	May 21, 2024	0.91
Quickfire Challenge: The celebrities had 60 minutes to prepare a dish that reflects their connection to cooking. The top four celebrities moved on to the Immunity Challenge.: Winners: José María, Alicia, David and Natalia; Immunity Challenge: José María, Alicia, David and Natalia must prepare three servings of three different pastas made from scratch: a long pasta, a stuffed pasta and a lasagna. Each could choose four other contestants to help them prepare their dishes, but only the captain could win immunity.: Burgundy Team: José María (C), Gary, Jason, Pancho, Paty; Blue Team: Alicia (C), Danka, Mariana, Niño Prodigio, El Puma; Yellow Team: David (C), Carolina, Daniela, Mark, Polo; Green Team: Natalia (C), Alejandro, Diana, Ivanna, Rosie; Winner: Natalia
97	2	"Una dificultad tras otra"	May 22, 2024	0.84
Express Challenge: The celebrities were asked to bread three egg yolks. Once a celebrity completed the challenge they were allowed to pick their partner. Due to the odd number of contestants, Alejandro was left without a partner. Natalia, who had won the previous immunity challenge, had to choose between giving him immunity or sending him directly to the elimination challenge. She chose the latter option. Quickfire Challenge: The celebrities, working in pairs, had 60 minutes to prepare any dish while cooking relay-style. The celebrities took turns cooking their team's dish, but were only allowed ten minutes each. The top three pairs moved on to the Immunity Challenge.: Winners: Puma and Mariana, Paty and David, Rosie and Carolina; Immunity Challenge: The celebrities were given 60 minutes to prepare any dish, but had to use a randomly assigned object as the plate for their dish. The winner received immunity from elimination.: Puma: Bird cage; Carolina: Elephant with bowl; Rosie: Stone; David: 3 tier stand; Mariana: Mousetrap; Paty: Articulated hand; Winner: Carolina
98	3	"El misterio en una caja"	May 23, 2024	0.87
Quickfire Challenge: The celebrities were allowed to choose their partners for the challenge. In a charades-like game, one partner was chosen to draw and act out the ingredients of a dish, while the other prepared it based on the indications given. The top five pairs moved on to the Immunity Challenge.: Winners: Niño and David, Gary and Alejandro, Paty and Mark, Natalia and Daniela, Pancho and José María; Immunity Challenge: The celebrities have 60 minutes to prepare a dish with ingredients chosen from the pantry by the celebrities who did not qualify for the challenge. The winner received immunity from elimination and a secret advantage.: Winner: José María
99	4	"Lidiar con la frustración"	May 24, 2024	0.84
Quickfire Challenge: The celebrities made dishes inspired by emojis. The top three celebrities became captains in the team challenge.: Winners: David, Jason and Niño; Team Challenge: The teams had 90 minutes to prepare a decorated cake. They had to measure the height of their cake as the team with the shortest cake would not be judged. The teams were picked by David, who had the best dish in the Quickfire challenge. The winning team won the opportunity to compete for immunity.: Yellow Team: David (C), Alicia, Danka, Polo; Blue Team: Jason (C), Diana, Gary, Pancho; Green Team: Niño (C), Ivanna, Puma, Rosie; Winners: Jason, Diana, Gary, Pancho; Immunity Challenge: The celebrities were asked to prepare tostones accompanied by a sauce. The winner received immunity from elimination.: Winner: Jason
100	5	"La búsqueda del tesoro"	May 26, 2024	0.64
Skills Challenge: Team captains Carolina, Jason, José María and Natalia competed in a skills challenge of four stages: preparing mashed potatoes, a dish using avocado as the main ingredient, grilled fish, and a dish using fruits. The winner of each stage had the advantage of assigning a celebrity to each team. Team Challenge: Carmen announces that the four teams must merge into two. Jason and Natalia merge their teams while Carolina and José María merge theirs. In a treasure hunt-like game, the teams must follow clues to find the ingredients that will allow them to complete their menu, consisting of an appetizer, a main course and a dessert. They are given two hours to complete the challenge. The winning team received immunity from elimination, while the losing team was sent to the elimination challenge.: Green Team: Carolina (C), José María (C), Alejandro, Alicia, David, Niño, Pancho, Puma; Yellow Team: Jason (C), Natalia (C), Daniela, Diana, Gary, Ivanna, Mariana, Polo; Winners: Carolina, José María, Alejandro, Alicia, David, Niño, Pancho, Puma
101	6	"Llega la primera eliminación"	May 27, 2024	0.83
Before the Safety Challenge began, José María's secret advantage was revealed: to swap one of the celebrities in danger of elimination for one of those who are safe. He decided to save Alejandro and swap him for Alicia. Safety Challenge: The celebrities were asked to prepare a dish inspired by their zodiac signs. The winner was safe from elimination.: Winner: Ivanna; Elimination Challenge: The celebrities were given 60 minutes to prepare a dish using only ingredients chosen by the judges.: Winners: Alicia, Danka and Gary; Eliminated: Daniela
102	7	"La visita de un experto"	May 28, 2024	0.89
Quickfire Challenge: The celebrities, working in pairs, have 60 minutes to make hot dogs with a side dish. Arturo Peniche from season 2 helped the celebrities prepare their sausages. The top five pairs moved on to the skills challenge.: Winners: Alicia and Niño, David and Jason, Danka and Gary, Alejandro and Puma, Diana and Pancho; Skills Challenge: The winners of the Quickfire Challenge competed in a skills challenge of three stages: peel 20 cloves of garlic, cut onions into 400 grams of slices, and whip egg whites by hand to stiff peaks. The first five to complete the stages advanced to the Immunity Challenge.: Winners: Pancho, Gary, Jason, Niño and David; Immunity Challenge: The celebrities had 60 minutes to prepare a dish with a protein. Pancho, having finished first in the skills challenge, had the advantage of assigning proteins to his competitors and how many minutes to take off their cooking time. The winner received immunity from elimination. The proteins assigned and minutes reduced by Pancho were: David: Pork rib, -50; Gary: Liver, -30; Jason: Lobster tail, -10; Niño: Tripe, -40; Pancho: Tomahawk steak, -5; Winner: Gary
103	8	"Entre gustos y colores"	May 29, 2024	0.85
Team Challenge: Working in trios, the celebrities must prepare two dishes with the ingredients they find in the judges' refrigerators. Gary assigned the fridges. Due to the absence of Paty and Rosie and the addition of Gabriel to the competition, they had to prepare three dishes. The winning teams advanced to the Quickfire Challenge.: Winners: Alejandro, Carolina and Ivanna; David, Polo and Puma; Gabriel, Paty and Rosie; José María, Mariana and Pancho; Quickfire Challenge: The celebrities, working in pairs, had 45 minutes to prepare a dish with the judges' most loved or most hated ingredient. The top four pairs were safe from elimination.: Mandarin orange: Alejandro, Puma; Flour: Ivanna, Pancho; Beets: Gabriel, José María; Cilantro: Carolina, Paty; Beef kidney: Mariana, Rosie; Sun-dried tomatoes: David, Polo; Winners: Alejandro and Puma, Gabriel and José María, Carolina and Paty, David and Polo
104	9	"Manos a la masa"	May 30, 2024	0.74
Safety Challenge: The celebrities were asked to prepare a pizza accompanied by a salad. The top four celebrities were safe from elimination.: Winners: Natalia, Ivanna, Niño, Danka; Elimination Challenge: The celebrities were given 60 minutes to cook any dish.: Winner: Diana; Eliminated: Mariana
105	10	"Ahí está el dilema"	May 31, 2024	0.80
Team Challenge: The celebrities were given 75 minutes to prepare a healthy dessert bar for 25 children. Chef Lauren Arboleda was the guest judge. The members of the winning team advanced to the Immunity Challenge.: Blue Team: David (C), Alicia, Gabriel, Gary, Ivanna, Natalia, Paty, Polo, Puma; Green Team: Alejandro (C), Carolina, Danka, Diana, Jason, José María, Niño, Pancho, Rosie; Winners: David, Alicia, Gabriel, Gary, Ivanna, Natalia, Paty, Polo, Puma; Immunity Challenge: The celebrities must recreate a dish from a Central American country. The winner received immunity from elimination and a secret advantage.: Belize: David (Chimole); Costa Rica: Gary (Casado), Natalia (Beef and potato picadillo); El Salvador: Alicia (Riguas), Paty (Pupusa); Guatemala: Polo (Jocón); Honduras: Puma (Chicken and rice); Nicaragua: Gabriel (Cuajada soup); Panama: Ivanna (Ropa vieja); Winner: Gary
106	11	"Sabor a triunfo"	June 2, 2024	N/A
Team Challenge: The teams had 60 minutes to prepare two different dishes. They had five minutes to shop in the pantry and plan their dishes. Due to the odd number of contestants, a knife draw granted Alicia automatic immunity from elimination and she did not have to compete in the challenge. However, Alicia would have to switch the teams from their initial workstations to a different station. Teams could start from scratch, continue the other team's recipe, or adjust it, but they could not go into the pantry for new ingredients. The winners were safe from the next elimination challenge.: Blue Team: Alejandro, Gabriel, Pancho, Rosie; Burgundy Team: Carolina, Diana, Ivanna, Niño; Green Team: José María, Natalia, Paty, Polo; Yellow Team: Danka, David, Jason, Puma; Winners: José María, Natalia, Paty, Polo; Quickfire Challenge: The celebrities, working in trios, were asked to prepare a brunch meal and drink. The winners were safe from the elimination challenge.: Winners: David, Diana, Rosie
107	12	"Miedo en la cocina"	June 3, 2024	N/A
Safety Challenge: The celebrities were given 75 minutes to prepare a dish with a protein. They had to bid on the protein they wanted and in order to pay for it, they had to give up minutes from their cooking time. The protein chosen and minutes reduced from their cooking time were: Alejandro: Rack of lamb for 10 minutes; Danka: Grouper for 30 minutes; Carolina: Rabbit for 35 minutes; Niño: Pig's trotter for 15 minutes; Gabriel: T-bone steak for 20 minutes; Jason: Stomach for 35 minutes; Ivanna: Tofu for 35 minutes; Pancho: Squid for 30 minutes; Puma: Sardines for 20 minutes; Winners: Niño, Alejandro, Puma; Elimination Challenge: The celebrities were asked to prepare a dish with corn as the main ingredient.: Eliminated: Ivanna
108	13	"Memorias"	June 4, 2024	N/A
Quickfire Challenge: The celebrities were challenged with preparing a dish based on their childhood memories. The top five celebrities moved on to the Immunity Challenge.: Winners: Polo, David, José María, Natalia, Niño; Immunity Challenge: Before the challenge began, Gary's secret advantage was revealed: trading one of the Quickfire Challenge winners for someone who didn't win. He decided to swap José María with himself. The celebrities were given 60 minutes to prepare a dish using beef tongue as their main ingredient. The winner received immunity from elimination.: Winner: Niño
109	14	"Llega el quinto"	June 5, 2024	N/A
Safety Challenge: The celebrities, working in pairs, have 60 minutes to cook any dish. One member of each pair had 3 minutes to shop in the pantry. Then, they had to roll a die and a spinning top. The die determined the number of ingredients and the spinning top determined what would happen to those ingredients. The winners were safe from elimination. The pairs and the results of their rolls were: Alejandro, Polo: Remove 2 of their own ingredients.; Alicia, Rosie: Exchange 6 ingredients with José María and Puma.; Carolina, Gabriel: : Remove one of their own ingredients.; Danka, Gary: Remove 5 of their own ingredients.; David, Diana: Remove 4 ingredients from José María and Puma.; Jason, Patricia: Remove 6 of their own ingredients.; José María, Puma: Remove 6 ingredients from David and Diana.; Natalia, Pancho: Remove 12 ingredients from Alicia and Rosie.; Winners: Jason and Patricia; Team Challenge: The teams, assigned by Jason and Patricia, were given 60 minutes to prepare a buffet that includes 3 warm dishes and 2 cold dishes. The winning team was safe from elimination.: Burgundy Team: Alicia, Danka, Gabriel, Gary, Natalia, Polo, Rosie; Yellow Team: Alejandro, Carolina, David, Diana, José María, Pancho, Puma; Winners: Alejandro, Carolina, David, Diana, José María, Pancho, Puma
110	15	"Besitos de coco"	June 6, 2024	N/A
Safety Challenge: The celebrities must prepare a dessert that incorporates macaroon cookies. The top two celebrities were safe from elimination.: Winners: Polo, Gary; Elimination Challenge: The celebrities were given 60 minutes to prepare a dish using potatoes as their main ingredient.: Winners: Alicia, Rosie; Eliminated: Danka
111	16	"El teléfono roto"	June 7, 2024	N/A
Team Challenge: In a game of telephone, the teams had to replicate an appetizer, main course, and dessert created by the judges using only their verbal and written descriptions as guidance. Each team member took a 15-minute turn in the kitchen and had two minutes to explain the recipes to the next member. The winning team advanced to the Immunity Challenge.: Burgundy Team: Niño (C), Gabriel, Natalia, Puma, Alejandro; Green Team: Paty (C), Gary, José María, Rosie, Diana; Yellow Team: Polo (C), David, Carolina, Jason, Alicia; Winners: Polo, David, Carolina, Jason, Alicia; Immunity Challenge: The celebrities were challenged with preparing a vegetarian version of their assigned dishes. The winner received immunity from elimination and a secret advantage.: Alicia: Cochinita pibil; Carolina: Birria tacos; David: Bœuf bourguignon; Jason: Peruvian ceviche; Polo: Pad thai; Winner: Polo
112	17	"Amigos y rivales"	June 9, 2024	N/A
Before the Express Challenge began, Polo's secret advantage was revealed: granting automatic immunity to a celebrity and, at the same time, making them captain of the opposing team in the Restaurant Wars challenge. Express Challenge: The celebrities were asked to prepare ceviche. Once a celebrity completed the challenge they were allowed to pick their team. Restaurant Wars Challenge: The celebrities competed in Top Chef's traditional Restaurant Wars challenge. Each team was responsible for running a seafood restaurant and their menu had to include an appetizer, main course and a dessert. The winning team received immunity from elimination.: Entre Mares: Polo (C), Diana, Gabriel, Gary, Jason, Natalia, Paty, Rosie; Espuma de Mar: Puma (C), Alejandro, Alicia, Carolina, David, José María, Niño, Pancho; Winners: Polo, Diana, Gabriel, Gary, Jason, Natalia, Paty, Rosie
113	18	"Quinta eliminación"	June 10, 2024	N/A
Safety Challenge: The celebrities must recognize herbs by smell or appearance. Only if they guess correctly will they be able to choose which one to cook with. If they fail, they must cook with the herb they did not recognize. The top two celebrities were safe from elimination.: Alejandro: Lettuce; Alicia: Sage; Carolina: Citron; David: Parsley; José María: Dill; Niño: Basil; Pancho: Cilantro; Winners: Carolina and David; Elimination Challenge: The celebrities were given 60 minutes to prepare an empanada and a sauce.: Winner: Alicia; Eliminated: Alejandro
114	19	"Postre sobre la mesa"	June 11, 2024	N/A
Quickfire Challenge: The celebrities, working in trios, were challenged with preparing a dessert and presenting it as art on a table. The winning trios advanced to the Immunity Challenge.: Winners: Puma, Alicia and Gary; Gabriel, David and José María; Immunity Challenge: The celebrities were given 45 minutes to prepare a dish inspired by a memorable romantic date. The winner received immunity from elimination and a secret advantage.: Winner: Puma
115	20	"Quesadillas, enfados y llanto"	June 12, 2024	N/A
Express Challenge: The celebrities must prepare quesadillas. The judges only tasted those they considered visually appealing. The top two celebrities won the advantage of assigning teams for the next challenge.: Winners: Paty and Diana
116	21	"La miel a veces es amarga"	June 13, 2024	N/A
Quickfire Challenge: The celebrities, working in pairs, were given 60 minutes to prepare any dish but had to be tied back to back and each member do 5-minute relays. The top three pairs were safe from elimination.: Winners: Gabriel and Niño, Gary and Pancho, Rosie and Carolina; Safety Challenge: Before the challenge began, Puma's secret advantage was revealed: save one celebrity from elimination or save two celebrities from elimination in exchange his immunity. He decided to keep his immunity and only save Alicia. The celebrities were given 60 minutes to prepare a surf and turf dish using only ingredients provided by the judges.: Winners: Paty and David; Elimination Challenge: The celebrities were challenged with preparing a dish using honey as their main ingredient.: Winners: José Maria and Polo; Eliminated: Diana
117	22	"Noche de emociones"	June 14, 2024	N/A
Quickfire Challenge: The celebrities were challenged with preparing a dish that maximized every ingredient. The winner received a secret advantage.: Winner: Jason; Immunity Challenge: The celebrities had 60 minutes to cook a dish inspired by their fathers. The winner received immunity from elimination.: Winner: Paty
118	23	"Ayudantes de lujo"	June 16, 2024	N/A
Quickfire Challenge: The celebrities are divided into two turns and in 60 minutes cook a dish with the help of their friends and family. The top three celebrities in each turn will team up with Paty in the Safety Challenge, while the losers will form the opposing team.: 1st Turn: David, Jason, José María, Niño, Pancho, Puma and Rosie were asked to prepare creamy rice with shrimp. The family members began cooking the dish, while the celebrities had to peel 30 shrimp before joining them.; Winners: David, José María, Niño; 2nd Turn: Alicia, Carolina, Gabriel, Gary, Natalia and Polo were asked to prepare cordon bleu with aligot. The family members began cooking the dish, while the celebrities had to peel 15 potatoes before joining them.; Winners: Polo, Alicia, Gary; Safety Challenge: The celebrities, working in teams, were given 75 minutes to prepare a family-style meal that included a savory and a sweet dish. The winning team was safe from elimination.: Burgundy Team: Paty (C), Alicia, David, Gary, José María, Niño, Polo; Yellow Team: Gabriel (C), Carolina, Jason, Natalia, Pancho, Puma, Rosie; Winners: Paty, Alicia, David, Gary, José María, Niño, Polo
119	24	"A oscuras"	June 17, 2024	N/A
Safety Challenge: The celebrities competed in A Quiet Place: Day One-sponsored challenge where they were given 60 minutes to prepare any dish but had to shop from the pantry in total darkness and make as little noise as possible. For every instance they made noise, 2 minutes were subtracted from their cooking time. The top two celebrities were safe from elimination.: Winners: Carolina and Pancho; Elimination Challenge: The celebrities were given 60 minutes to cook any dish.: Winner: Rosie; Eliminated: Natalia
120	25	"El muro"	June 18, 2024	N/A
Quickfire Challenge: The celebrities had to cook a dish while simultaneously giving instructions to their partner, hidden behind a wall, on how to prepare the same dish. The partners were assigned via knife draw. The dishes had to resemble each others other in taste and presentation. The winners advanced to the Immunity Challenge. Due to the odd number of competitors, Pancho pulled a special knife that allowed him to automatically advance to the Immunity Challenge.: Alicia, Puma; Jason, Niño; David, Rosie; Carolina, Gary; Gabriel, Polo; José María, Paty; Winners: José María and Paty, Carolina and Gary; Immunity Challenge: The celebrities were given 30 minutes to prepare eggs benedict. The winner was safe from elimination.: Winner: Gary
121	26	"Sabor mexicano"	June 19, 2024	N/A
Before the Quickfire Challenge began, Jason's secret advantage was revealed: automatic immunity from elimination. Quickfire Challenge: The celebrities were challenged with preparing four tacos and three different sauces. The winner received immunity from elimination.: Winner: David; Safety Challenge: The celebrities, working in pairs, were given 60 minutes to cook a micro-sized three-course meal. The winning pair was safe from elimination.: Winners: Paty and Rosie
122	27	"Una eliminación amarga"	June 20, 2024	N/A
Safety Challenge: The celebrities used a slot machine to determine the guidelines for their dish. The machine assigned a protein, sauce, side dish, and number of identical dishes to prepare. The winners were safe from elimination.: Winners: Polo and Niño; Elimination Challenge: The celebrities were given 60 minutes to prepare a dish using mushrooms as their main ingredient.: Eliminated: Puma
123	28	"Sexto sentido"	June 21, 2024	N/A
Quickfire Challenge: The celebrities, working in trios, competed in the Black Box challenge. After entering the black box, which covered the celebrities in total darkness, each team had three minutes to taste, smell and feel a mystery dish. The teams then had 45 minutes to recreate the dish. The two teams with the most similar dishes advanced to the Immunity Challenge.: Blue Team: José María, Paty, Rosie; Burgundy Team: David, Gabriel, Polo; Green Team: Alicia, Niño, Pancho; Yellow Team: Carolina, Gary, Jason; Winners: José María, Paty and Rosie; David, Gabriel and Polo; Immunity Challenge: The celebrities were asked to prepare three different arepas. The winner received the last secret advantage of the season and immunity from elimination.: Winner: Gabriel
124	29	"La boda"	June 23, 2024	N/A
Express Challenge: Team captains Gabriel and Jason must prepare three canapé's and three drinks. The winner was the first to choose the members of his team.: Winner: Jason; Team Challenge: The celebrities catered two weddings (40 guests to be served per team). Each team prepared a different menu for each wedding, consisting of an appetizer, the main course and a cake. The yellow team had the advantage of choosing which wedding to cater. The winning team received immunity from elimination, while the losing team was sent to the next elimination challenge. At the end of the challenge, the judges announced that they needed more time to decide which team was the winner.: Blue Team: Gabriel (C), Alicia, Carolina, David, Niño, Rosie; Yellow Team: Jason (C), Gary, José María, Paty, Pancho, Polo
125	30	"Al ritmo del chef"	June 24, 2024	N/A
The judges announce to the celebrities that both teams in the previous Team Challenge had an equal performance, so they suspend the Elimination Challenge. Quickfire Challenge: The celebrities must keep up with guest judge Chef Gerardo Vázquez Lugo in recreating his dish of coastal marinated fish. The five celebrities to best replicate the dish advanced to the Immunity Challenge.: Winners: Paty, Gabriel, Carolina, Jason, Gary; Immunity Challenge: The celebrities were given 60 minutes to prepare a dish using rice as their main ingredient. The winner received immunity from elimination.: Winner: Gary
126	31	"Personajes de película"	June 25, 2024	N/A
Quickfire Challenge: The celebrities, working in pairs, competed in a Despicable Me 4-sponsored challenge, where they had to prepare a dish inspired by a character from the film. The top three pairs moved on to the Immunity Challenge.: Gru: Jason, José María; Gru Jr.: Polo, Rosie; Lucy: Gabriel, Gary; Maxime Le Mal: Alicia, Niño; Poppy: David, Pancho; Valentina: Carolina, Paty; Winners: Carolina and Paty, David and Pancho, Polo and Rosie; Immunity Challenge: The celebrities had 60 minutes to cook any dish but every so often they had to add a mystery ingredient. The pantry was open for the first three minutes. The winner received immunity from elimination. The mystery ingredients were: Carolina: dashi, red lentil, tejate; David: tomatillo, couscous, condensed milk; Pancho: arugula, turmeric, blueberries; Paty: pomegranate, black tea, baby spinach; Polo: cucumber, pickles, hibiscus; Rosie: Mexican tea, lavender, soy sauce; Winner: David
127	32	"Vergüenza propia"	June 26, 2024	N/A
Quickfire Challenge: The celebrities were challenged with preparing a dish inspired by an embarrassing moment in their lives. The top two celebrities were safe from elimination.: Winners: Paty and José María; Safety Challenge: The celebrities, working in trios, were given 60 minutes to prepare three dishes individually. One member of the team had to taste the three dishes prepared and choose which one to present to the judges. The winning team was safe from elimination.: Blue Team: Gary (C), Gabriel, Niño; Burgundy Team: David (C), Alicia, Rosie; Green Team: Paty (C), Carolina, Pancho; Yellow Team: José María (C), Jason, Polo; Winners: José María, Jason, Polo
128	33	"Cuatro celebridades en riesgo"	June 27, 2024	N/A
Safety Challenge: The celebrities competed in a Royal Prestige-sponsored challenge where they were able to cook any dish but could only use three utensils from the cookware company. The top two celebrities were safe from elimination.: Winners: Niño and Pancho; Elimination Challenge: The celebrities were given 60 minutes to cook any dish.: Eliminated: Rosie
129	34	"Dulce y salado"	June 28, 2024	N/A
The celebrities cooked without knowing the rules or dish of the challenge. Those who guessed the dish correctly advanced to the Immunity Challenge. The correct dish was cupcakes.: Winners: Polo, David, Carolina, Niño, Jason, Paty; Immunity Challenge: The celebrities were given 60 minutes to prepare fried chicken with a sauce. The winner received immunity from elimination.: Winner: Paty
130	35	"La feria de las vanidades"	June 30, 2024	N/A
Express Challenge: The celebrities were asked to prepare churros. The top four celebrities joined Paty's team for the Team Challenge and had 500 extra points to spend in the pantry.: Winners: Carolina, Polo, Alicia, David; Team Challenge: The teams had 75 minutes to prepare three different carnival foods for 50 guests and the judges, with the guests voting for their favorite. In order to purchase ingredients, the celebrities played carnival games to win points to spend in the pantry. Each team received help from a finalist of the previous seasons. The burgundy team was assisted by Cristina Eustace and Sebastián Villalobos. The green team was assisted by Germán Montero and Jesús Moré. The winning team was safe from elimination. The Green team won 38-12.: Burgundy Team: Paty (C), Alicia, Carolina, David, Polo; Green Team: Pancho (C), Gabriel, Jason, José María, Niño; Winners: Pancho, Gabriel, Jason, José María, Niño
131	36	"Cuatro contra el mundo"	July 1, 2024	N/A
Safety Challenge: The celebrities were given 60 minutes to prepare a dish using an exotic protein. The winner was safe from elimination.: Alicia: pirarucu; Carolina: piranha; David: ostrich; Polo: guinea pig; Winner: Alicia; Elimination Challenge: Carolina, David and Polo were asked to prepare a dish using beans as their main ingredient. After the challenge ended, Gabriel's secret advantage was revealed: cancel one of the next two eliminations. He decided to use his advantage and canceled the elimination.
132	37	"Cinco exparticipantes de visita"	July 2, 2024	N/A
Quickfire Challenge: The celebrities were given 3 minutes to shop in the pantry. Afterwards, they had to swap cooking stations and had 60 minutes to prepare any dish using their new ingredients. The top five celebrities moved on to the Immunity Challenge.: Winners: David, Gabriel, Alicia, Jason, Carolina; Immunity Challenge: The celebrities were challenged with replicating a favorite dish of a contestant from previous seasons, who helped judge the dishes. The winner received immunity from elimination. The contestants and dishes chosen by the celebrities were: Alicia: Aida Cuevas – Huachinango a la Veracruzana; Carolina: Marlene Favela – Peruvian ceviche; David: Jose Gumbs – Dominican sancocho; Jason: Helen Ochoa – Mexican empanadas; Gabriel: Génesis Suero – Spaghetti alle vongole; Winner: Alicia
133	38	"Chefs a ciegas"	July 3, 2024	N/A
Safety Challenge: The celebrities had 60 minutes to cook any dish and the judges tasted the dishes without knowing who had prepared them. The top five celebrities were safe from elimination.: Winners: David, Niño, Jason, Pancho, Gary; Elimination Challenge: The celebrities were asked to prepare an appetizer and a main course, with one dish being cold and the other hot.: Winner: José María; Eliminated: Polo
134	39	"Happy 4th of July"	July 4, 2024	N/A
Quickfire Challenge: The celebrities were given 45 minutes to prepare a side dish typically found in an American diner. The top five celebrities advanced to the Immunity Challenge.: Winners: Paty, David, Pancho, Gabriel, Carolina; Immunity Challenge: The celebrities were challenged with preparing a hamburger accompanied by a side dish and a milkshake.: Winner: Paty
135	40	"Chispas en la cava"	July 5, 2024	N/A
Quickfire Challenge: The celebrities were asked to prepare a fusion dish that combined a classic Latin dish with ingredients from a country outside Latin America.: Winners: Jason, Niño, David, Pancho, José María; Immunity Challenge: The celebrities were challenged with scaling, filleting and cooking a fish.: Winner: José María
136	41	"Entre sustos y criaturas de terror"	July 7, 2024	N/A
Quickfire Challenge: Team captains José María and Paty were asked to prepare three different appetizers, each using a different insect as the main ingredient. The winner would get the first pick in choosing members of their team.: José María: grasshoppers, culona ants, Mojojoy; Paty: chicatana ants, maguey worms, lemon ants; Winner: Paty; Safety Challenge: The celebrities, working in teams, had 75 minutes to prepare a four-course meal. Each team had 16 baskets to shop in the pantry, which was located in a haunted house.: Burgundy Team: Paty (C), Alicia, Carolina, David, Niño; Yellow Team: José María (C), Gabriel, Gary, Jason, Pancho; Winners: Paty, Alicia, Carolina, David, Niño
137	42	"Los Mosqueteros en peligro"	July 8, 2024	N/A
Safety Challenge: Gabriel, Gary, Jason and Pancho were challenged with preparing a swiss roll.: Winner: Gabriel; Elimination Challenge: Gary, Jason and Pancho were given 60 minutes to prepare a dish using eggplant as their main ingredient.: Winner: Gary; Eliminated: Jason
138	43	"Guerra total"	July 9, 2024	N/A
Quickfire Challenge: The celebrities were given 60 minutes to prepare a dish using chili peppers as their main ingredient. They could pick any chili they liked, but they had to sacrifice cooking time. The top five celebrities moved on to the Immunity Challenge. The chili chosen and minutes reduced from their cooking time were: Alicia: Habanero for 15 minutes; Carolina: Rocoto for 20 minutes; David: Santandereano for 25 minutes; José María: Serrano pepper for 35 minutes; Gabriel: Ají dulce for 50 minutes; Gary: Ají amarillo for 30 minutes; Niño: Ghost pepper for 10 minutes; Pancho: Jalapeño for 40 minutes; Paty: Carolina Reaper for 5 minutes; Winners: Paty, Niño, Gary, Pancho, Gabriel; Immunity Challenge: The celebrities were challenged with preparing a dish based on the color that was randomly assigned to them. The winner received immunity from elimination.: Winner: Gary
139	44	"Dulce salvación"	July 10, 2024	N/A
Quickfire Challenge: The celebrities were given 60 minutes to make ice cream from scratch with unconventional flavors. The flavor of their ice cream was assigned by a roulette wheel. The winner was safe from elimination.: Alicia: Salsa verde; Carolina: Caviar; David: Morita pepper; Gabriel: Beer; José María: Grilled corn; Niño: Japanese pepper; Pancho: Black garlic; Paty: Spanish omelette; Winner: Paty; Safety Challenge: The celebrities, working in pairs, were challenged with replicating a cake in the shape of a television set, designed by chef Samuel Araque. Due to the odd number of competitors, Alicia formed a trio with Gary and Paty. The winners were safe from elimination.: Winners: Alicia, Gary, Paty
140	45	"La eliminación más decepcionante"	July 11, 2024	N/A
Safety Challenge: The celebrities were asked to prepare a Tex-Mex dish with their own personal touch. The winner was safe from elimination.: Winner: David; Elimination Challenge: The celebrities were given 60 minutes to cook any dish.: Winner: Carolina; Eliminated: Pancho
141	46	"Reencuentro no tan deseado"	July 12, 2024	N/A
Nine previously eliminated celebrities competed against each other in two Quickfire Challenges for a chance to re-enter the competition. Quickfire Challenge #1: The eliminated contestants were given 60 minutes to reinvent one of their worst dishes they had ever prepared. The winner, chosen by the judges, returned to the competition.: Winner: Natalia; Quickfire Challenge #2: The eliminated contestants were challenged with preparing a family-style dish. The celebrities who are still in the competition voted for the eliminated contestant they wanted to return to the competition.: Winner: Mariana
142	47	"Batalla sobre ruedas"	July 14, 2024	N/A
Express Challenge: The celebrities were asked to prepare chips and dip. Once a celebrity completed the challenge they were allowed to pick their partner. Restaurant Wars Challenge: The celebrities were split into five pairs and were responsible for running a food truck, each one serving different meals. They had 90 minutes to prepare meals for sixty guests. José María and Gary had the advantage of assigning food trucks. The top two pairs were safe from elimination.: Carolina and David: Quesadillas and tostones; José María and Gary: Shawarma and kibbeh; Mariana and Gabriel: Tacos and burritos; Natalia and Alicia: Chicken sandwich and esquites; Niño and Paty: Pizza and arancini; Winners: Carolina and David, Niño and Paty
143	48	"Una nueva despedida"	July 15, 2024	N/A
Safety Challenge: The celebrities were given 60 minutes to prepare any dish but the total weight of their ingredients had to be less than seven pounds. Each celebrity was given three minutes to shop in the pantry. The top two celebrities were safe from elimination.: Winners: Alicia and Natalia; Elimination Challenge: The celebrities were asked to prepare a dish with bananas as the main ingredient.: Eliminated: Mariana
144	49	"Alanadas para la inmunidad"	July 16, 2024	N/A
Skills Challenge: The celebrities, working in trios, competed in a two part Skills Challenge. In the first part, each team member was assigned a prep task: cut a chicken breast into eight cutlets, supreme three oranges, and peel four yuca's. Afterwards, they had to use these ingredients to prepare a dish in 60 minutes. The members of the top two teams advanced to the Immunity Challenge.: Blue Team: Alicia, Carolina, Gabriel; Burgundy Team: Natalia, Niño, Paty; Yellow Team: David, Gary, José María; Winners: David, Gary, José María; Natalia, Niño, Paty; Immunity Challenge: The celebrities were challenged with preparing a dish using the molecular gastronomy technique, and were guided by season 2 winner Alana Lliteras.: Winner: David
145	50	"Cocina con corazón"	July 17, 2024	N/A
Safety Challenge #1: The celebrities were asked to prepare a dish with ingredients from a region of Mexico. The regions were assigned by David. Chef Betty Vázquez was the guest judge. The top two celebrities were safe from elimination.: Alicia: Gulf coast; Carolina, Gabriel: Baja California Peninsula; Gary, Niño: Yucatán Peninsula; José María: North Mexico; Paty: Pacific coast; Natalia: Central Mexico; Winners: Paty and Niño; Safety Challenge #2: The celebrities were randomly assigned the heart of a different ingredient and had 60 minutes to prepare their dish. The winner was safe from elimination.: Alicia: goat; Carolina: cheep; Gabriel: artichoke; Gary: pork; José María: chicken; Natalia: beef; Winner: Alicia
146	51	"Décima tercera eliminación"	July 18, 2024	N/A
Safety Challenge: The celebrities were given 60 minutes to prepare a tamale. The winner was safe from elimination.: Winners: Carolina and Natalia; Elimination Challenge: Gabriel, Gary and José María were challenged with preparing a dish using shellfish.: Winner: José María; Eliminated: Gabriel
147	52	"La última inmunidad"	July 19, 2024	N/A
Quickfire Challenge: The celebrities, working in teams, had 60 minutes to prepare two dishes, one sweet and one savory, with cocoa as the main ingredient. The members of the winning team advanced to the Immunity Challenge.: Burgundy Team: David (C), Alicia, Gary, Natalia; Yellow Team: Paty (C), Carolina, José María, Niño; Winners: Paty, Carolina, José María, Niño; Immunity Challenge: Inspired by the reality competition series La isla: desafío extremo, the celebrities were given 45 minutes to prepare a dish using heart of palm as the main ingredient. The winner received the final immunity of the season.: Winner: Niño
148	53	"Eliminación sin electricidad"	July 21, 2024	N/A
Safety Challenge: The celebrities were assigned different types of grills and had 40 minutes to prepare kebabs with a sauce. The grills were assigned by Niño. The top two celebrities were safe from elimination.: Square grill: David; Robata grill: Gary; Rotisserie grill: Alicia; Charcoal grill: Paty; Argentine grill: Natalia; Gas grill: José María; Kamado grill: Carolina; Winners: Natalia and Paty; Elimination Challenge: The celebrities were asked to prepare any dish, but had to share the same fire pit, with the option of using a griddle and a kamado grill. They were assisted by Natalia, Patricia and Niño.: Eliminated: Carolina
149	54	"Primer semifinalista"	July 22, 2024	N/A
Quickfire Challenge: The celebrities were given 60 minutes to prepare a paella. The top three celebrities advanced to the Semifinal Qualifying Challenge.: Winners: Paty, David, José María; Semifinal Qualification Challenge: Paty, David and José María were challenged with preparing a dessert with vegetables and fruits. The winner advanced to the Semifinal.: Winner: David
150	55	"Que la suerte te acompañe"	July 23, 2024	N/A
Quickfire Challenge: The celebrities were randomly assigned a Chinese dish and had 60 minutes to prepare it. The top three celebrities advanced to the Semifinal Qualifying Challenge.: Alicia: Fried rice; Gary: Kung Pao chicken; José María: Spring roll; Natalia: Chow mein; Niño: Chop suey; Paty: Jiaozi; Winners: Niño, Paty, José María; Semifinal Qualification Challenge: Niño, Paty and José María were challenged with preparing three different tartares. The winner advanced to the Semifinal.: Winner: Paty
151	56	"Con las emociones a flor de piel"	July 24, 2024	N/A
Quickfire Challenge: The celebrities had 60 minutes to cook any dish and present it in three different plating styles. The top three celebrities advanced to the Semifinal Qualifying Challenge.: Winners: Gary, Natalia, José María; Semifinal Qualification Challenge: Gary, Natalia and José María were challenged with preparing a dish that incorporated textures. The winner advanced to the Semifinal.: Winner: Natalia
152	57	"Se acaban los cupos"	July 25, 2024	N/A
Semifinal Qualification Challenge #1: Alicia, Gary, José María and Niño were asked to prepare a dish with cheese as the main ingredient. The winner advanced to the Semifinal.: Winner: José María; Semifinal Qualification Challenge #2: Alicia, Gary and Niño were given 60 minutes to prepare a dish using apples as the main ingredient. They were assisted by a semifinalist, with José María assigning partners. Gary was assisted by Paty, while Niño was assisted by David, and Alicia was assisted by Natalia. The winner advanced to the Semifinal.: Winner: Gary; Semifinal Qualification Challenge #3: Alicia and Niño were challenged with creating a unique variation of their best dish in the competition. The winner became the sixth and final semifinalist.: Winner: Niño; Eliminated: Alicia
153	58	"Primer finalista"	July 26, 2024	N/A
Semifinal: The top 6 celebrities were given 60 minutes to prepare any dish. Each celebrity had to present two servings of the same dish, one for the judges and another for guest food critics, who happened to be their relatives. The cooking order was based on who qualified for the semifinal first. The winner advanced to the Finale.: Winner: Paty
154	59	"A un paso"	July 28, 2024	N/A
Semifinal: David, José María, Gary, Natalia and Niño were given 75 minutes to prepare six servings of a dish that used ingredients from Colombian cuisine. World-renowned chefs Denise Monroy, Francis Pena, and Pablo Bonilla served as guest judges. A knife draw determined the cooking order. The top three celebrities advanced to the Finale.: Winners: Niño, David, José María; Eliminated: Gary, Natalia
155	60	"El menú de la victoria"	July 29, 2024	1.30
