= Top Chef VIP season 1 =

Top Chef VIP
- Season 1
- Hosted by: Carmen Villalobos
- Judges: Antonio de Livier; Adria Marina Montaño; Juan Manuel Barrientos
- No. of contestants: 16
- Winner: Lambda García
- No. of episodes: 35

Release
- Original network: Telemundo
- Original release: August 9 – September 26, 2022

Season chronology
- Next → Season 2

The first season of the American competitive reality television series Top Chef VIP premiered on Telemundo on August 9, 2022, and concluded on September 26, 2022. The season is hosted Carmen Villalobos, with Antonio de Livier, Adria Marina Montaño and Juan Manuel Barrientos as judges. The season was won by actor Lambda García, who received US$100,000.

== Contestants ==
Sixteen celebrities were selected to compete.

Name	Age	Hometown	Notability
Aida Cuevas	58	Mexico City, Mexico	Singer/actress
Chiky Bom Bom	34	Dominican Republic	Internet personality
Cristina Eustace	43	Chihuahua, Mexico	Singer
Ferdinando Valencia	40	Comala, Mexico	Actor
Graciela Beltrán	47	Los Angeles, California	Singer
Gregorio Pernía	52	Cúcuta, Colombia	Actor
Héctor Suárez Gomís	53	Mexico City, Mexico	Actor
Horacio Pancheri	39	Esquel, Argentina	Actor
Jennifer Peña	38	San Antonio, Texas	Singer
Lambda García	35	Mexico City, Mexico	Actor
Luis Coronel	26	Tucson, Arizona	Singer
Marlene Favela	45	Santiago Papasquiaro, Mexico	Actress
Mauricio Islas	48	Mexico City, Mexico	Actor
Rodrigo Vidal	49	Mexico City, Mexico	Actor
Scarlet Ortiz	48	Caracas, Venezuela	Actress
Zuleyka Rivera	34	Cayey, Puerto Rico	Miss Universe 2006

== Contestant progress ==
Episode #		1	2	3		4	5		6		7		8		9		10		11		12		13		14	15		16		17		18		19	20		21		22		23		24	25		26		27		28		29		30		31		32		33	34	35
Quickfire Challenge Winner(s)		Chiky	Ferdinando; Héctor; Rodrigo; Zuleyka	—N/a	—N/a	—N/a	—N/a	—N/a	—N/a	Héctor; Zuleyka	Zuleyka	—N/a	—N/a	—N/a	—N/a	—N/a	—N/a	—N/a	Horacio	—N/a	Rodrigo	—N/a	—N/a	—N/a	—N/a	—N/a	—N/a	Horacio	Chiky; Zuleyka	—N/a	—N/a	—N/a	—N/a	—N/a	—N/a	—N/a	—N/a	—N/a	Mauricio	—N/a	—N/a	—N/a	—N/a	—N/a	—N/a	—N/a	Lambda; Zuleyka	Chiky; Cristina; Rodrigo	—N/a	—N/a	—N/a	Mauricio; Lambda; Zuleyka	—N/a	Chiky; Héctor; Marlene; Zuleyka	—N/a	Cristina; Lambda; Chiky	—N/a	—N/a	—N/a	—N/a	—N/a	—N/a
1	Lambda	IN	IN	IN	—	WIN	IMM	IMM	IN	IN	—N/a	WIN	IMM	IMM	HIGH	WIN	IMM	IMM	HIGH	IN	—N/a	HIGH	WIN	IMM	WIN	IMM	IMM	IN	IN	—N/a	IN	IN	OUT										WIN^{2}	IMM	IMM	IN	WIN	—N/a	IN	WIN	IMM	WIN	WIN	IN	—N/a	WIN	IMM	WIN	IMM	WIN	IMM	WINNER
2	Cristina	IN	IN	IN	—	LOW	IN	LOW	IN	IN	—N/a	IN	HIGH	IN	IN	LOW	WIN	IMM	IN	IN	—N/a	IN	HIGH	WIN	LOW	WIN	IMM	IN	IN	—N/a	IN	WIN	IMM	LOW	WIN	IMM	HIGH	IN	—N/a	IN	IN	IN	WIN	IMM	IMM	IN	IN	WIN	WIN	IMM	IMM	IN	WIN	IN	—N/a	WIN	IMM	WIN	IMM	IN	IN	RUNNER-UP
2	Mauricio	—N/a^{1}	—N/a^{1}	—N/a^{1}		WIN	IMM	IMM	IN	IN	—N/a	WIN	IMM	IMM	HIGH	WIN	IMM	IMM	IN	IN	—N/a	HIGH	IN	LOW	WIN	IMM	IMM	IN	HIGH	—N/a	WIN	IMM	IMM	LOW	WIN	IMM	IN	WIN	WIN	IN	IN	IN	WIN	IMM	IMM	IN	IN	WIN	WIN	IMM	IMM	WIN	WIN	IN	—N/a	IN	IN	IN	IN	IN	IN	RUNNER-UP
2	Zuleyka	HIGH	WIN	IN	—	WIN	IMM	IMM	IN	WIN	IMM	IMM	IMM	IMM	HIGH	WIN	IMM	IMM	IN	IN	—N/a	IN	IN	LOW	LOW	IN	WIN	HIGH	WIN	IMM	IN	WIN	IMM	LOW	WIN	IMM	HIGH	HIGH	—N/a	IN	IN	IN	LOW	IN	LOW	IN	WIN	—N/a	IN	IN	IN	WIN	WIN	WIN	WIN	IMM	IMM	WIN	IMM	IN	IN	RUNNER-UP
5	Chiky	WIN	IN	WIN	IN	IMM	IMM	IMM	IN	IN	—N/a	IN	IN	IN	WIN	WIN	IMM	IMM	IN	WIN	IMM	IMM	IMM	IMM	LOW	IN	WIN	IN	WIN	IMM	WIN	IMM	IMM	LOW	IN	IN	IN	WIN	IN	IN	WIN	IMM	WIN	IMM	IMM	IN	IN	WIN	WIN	IMM	IMM	IN	WIN	WIN	IN	WIN	IMM	IN	IN	IN	OUT	
5	Ferdinando	IN	WIN	IN	—	—N/a^{1}	HIGH	IN	IN	HIGH	—N/a	IN	HIGH	IN	WIN	WIN	IMM	IMM	IN	IN	—N/a	HIGH	IN	LOW	LOW	IN	WIN	IN	IN	—N/a	IN	HIGH	WIN	LOW	WIN	IMM	IN	HIGH	—N/a	IN	WIN	IMM	WIN	IMM	IMM	WIN	IMM	IMM	IMM	IMM	IMM	IN	WIN	IN	—N/a	IN	IN	IN	IN	IN	OUT	
7	Marlene	—N/a^{1}	—N/a^{1}	WIN	WIN	IMM	IMM	IMM	IN	IN	—N/a	IN	IN	IN	IN	LOW	HIGH	LOW	IN	IN	—N/a	WIN	IMM	IMM	WIN	IMM	IMM	IN	IN	—N/a	IN	IN	LOW	LOW	IN	LOW	IN	IN	—N/a	WIN	IMM	IMM	LOW	IN	WIN	IN	IN	LOW	IN	IN	IN	IN	WIN	WIN	IN	IN	IN	IN	OUT			
8	Héctor	IN	WIN	WIN	IN	WIN	IMM	IMM	IN	WIN	IMM	IMM	IMM	IMM	WIN	WIN	IMM	IMM	IN	IN	—N/a	IN	HIGH	WIN	LOW	IN	OUT																LOW^{2}	IN	LOW	IN	IN	LOW	IN	IN	IN	IN	WIN	WIN	IN	IN	OUT					
9	Rodrigo	IN	WIN	WIN	IN	WIN	IMM	IMM	HIGH	IN	—N/a	IN	WIN	IMM	IN	LOW	IN	WIN	IN	WIN	IMM	IMM	IMM	IMM	WIN	IMM	IMM	IN	HIGH	—N/a	IN	HIGH	WIN	LOW	IN	LOW	WIN	IMM	IMM	IMM	IMM	IMM	LOW	WIN	IMM	IN	IN	LOW	IN	IN	OUT											
10	Gregorio	HIGH	IN	—N/a^{1}		WIN	IMM	IMM	HIGH	IN	—N/a	WIN	IMM	IMM	IN	LOW	IN	WIN	IN	WIN	IMM	IMM	IMM	IMM	WIN	IMM	IMM	IN	IN	—N/a	IN	IN	WIN	LOW	IN	LOW	HIGH	IN	—N/a	WIN	IMM	IMM	LOW	IN	OUT																	
11	Aida	HIGH	IN	WIN	IN	—N/a^{1}	IN	IN	WIN	IMM	IMM	IMM	IMM	IMM	WIN	WIN	IMM	IMM	IN	IN	—N/a	WIN	IMM	IMM	WIN	IMM	IMM	IN	IN	—N/a	WIN	IMM	IMM	LOW	IN	IN	IN	IN	—N/a	IN	IN	OUT																				
12	Horacio	IN	—N/a^{1}	—N/a^{1}		LOW	WIN	IMM	IN	HIGH	—N/a	WIN	IMM	IMM	IN	LOW	IN	LOW	WIN	IMM	IMM	IMM	IMM	IMM	LOW	IN	LOW	WIN	IMM	IMM	IMM	IMM	IMM	LOW	IN	OUT																										
13	Graciela	HIGH	IN	WIN	HIGH	LOW	IN	WIN	IN	HIGH	—N/a	IN	IN	LOW	IN	LOW	IN	LOW	IN	IN	—N/a	IN	IN	OUT																																						
14	Luis	IN	IN	IN	—	LOW	HIGH	IN	IN	IN	—N/a	IN	IN	LOW	HIGH	LOW	IN	OUT																																												
15	Jennifer	—N/a^{1}	—N/a^{1}	—N/a^{1}		—N/a^{1}	WIN	IMM	IN	HIGH	—N/a	IN	IN	OUT																																																
16	Scarlet	HIGH	IN	IN	—	LOW	IN	OUT																																																						

^Note 1: The celebrity was unable to compete in the challenge for personal reasons.
^Note 2: Héctor and Lambda won the Re-entry Challenge and returned to the competition.

(WINNER) The chef won the season and was crowned "Top Chef".
(RUNNER-UP) The chef was a runner-up for the season.
(WIN) The chef won an individual challenge (Quickfire Challenge, Immunity Challenge, Safety Challenge, or Elimination Challenge).
(WIN) The chef was on the winning team in the Team Challenge and directly advanced to the next round.
(HIGH) The chef was selected as one of the top entries in an individual or team challenge, but did not win.
(IN) The chef was not selected as one of the top or bottom entries in an individual challenge and was safe.
(IN) The chef was not selected as a top or bottom entry in a Team Challenge.
(IMM) The chef didn't have to compete in that round of the competition and was safe from elimination.
(IMM) The chef had to compete in that round of the competition but was safe from elimination.
(—) The chef was on the losing team in the Team Challenge and was unable to compete in the Immunity Challenge.
(LOW) The chef was selected as one of the bottom entries in the Elimination Challenge, but was not eliminated.
(LOW) The chef was one of the bottom entries in a Team Challenge.
(OUT) The chef lost the Elimination Challenge.

== Episodes ==
No. overall	No. in season	Title	Original release date	US viewers (millions)
1	1	"Se encienden los fogones"	August 9, 2022	1.11
Quickfire Challenge: The celebrities had the free challenge to prepare something that reflects their personality. The winner received immunity from elimination.: Winner: Chiky
2	2	"Cocineros en aprietos"	August 10, 2022	1.05
Quickfire Challenge: Working in pairs, each celebrity had to select a knife and the one with the same number would be their partner. Each celebrity chose a box with a random secret ingredient and combine it with their partners ingredient into one dish. Instead of immunity, the winners became team captains in the next team challenge.: Team 1: Ferdinando, Zuleyka; Team 2: Chiky, Graciela; Team 3: Cristina, Lambda; Team 4: Scarlet, Gregorio; Team 5: Aída, Luis; Team 6: Héctor, Rodrigo; Winners: Ferdinando, Zuleyka, Héctor, Rodrigo; Skills Challenge: The remaining celebrities competed in a skills challenge of three stages: cook a fried egg, a poached egg and make meringue. Once a celebrity completed the three stages they were able to choose which team they wanted to join. Aída and Graciela were the last to finish the challenge and were automatically on the Héctor's team.
3	3	"Tras un gol culinario"	August 11, 2022	0.83
Team Challenge: Inspired by the 2022 FIFA World Cup in Qatar, the celebrities in teams of three were asked to prepare an Arabian dish with a Latin twist. The members of the top two teams won the opportunity to compete for immunity.: Blue Team: Zuleyka (C), Lambda, Scarlet; Burgundy Team: Héctor (C), Aída, Graciela; Black Team: Ferdinando (C), Cristina, Luis; Yellow Team: Rodrigo (C), Chiky, Marlene; Winners: Aída, Graciela, Héctor, Chiky, Marlene, Rodrigo; Immunity Challenge: The celebrities that won the team challenge were asked to prepare a typical Latin dish using at least 3 spices. The winner received immunity from elimination.: Winner: Marlene
4	4	"Sol, arena y buena masa"	August 12, 2022	0.83
Restaurant Wars Challenge: The celebrities competed in Top Chef's traditional Restaurant Wars challenge. The contestants, split into two teams, were responsible for transforming an empty space into a fully functioning pop-up restaurant within 24 hours. The teams were led by Marlene and Chiky, who were safe for the week but still has to participate. The team captains first had the challenge to prepare four cocktail drinks, with the winner being allowed to pick the members of their team. The winning team received immunity from elimination, while the losing team was sent to the elimination challenge.: Raíces del Caribe: Marlene (C), Gregorio, Héctor, Lambda, Mauricio, Rodrigo, Zuleyka; Sal Si Puedes: Chiky (C), Cristina, Graciela, Horacio, Luis, Scarlet; Winners: Marlene, Gregorio, Héctor, Lambda, Mauricio, Rodrigo, Zuleyka
5	5	"En la cuerda floja"	August 15, 2022	0.92
Safety Challenge: The losing team of the Restaurant Wars challenge, and Ferdinando and Jennifer, who were unable to participate in the challenge, were asked to prepare a dish with avocado as the main ingredient of the dish. The celebrities worked in pairs. The winners were safe from elimination.: Aida, Graciela; Cristina, Scarlet; Ferdinando, Luis; Horacio, Jennifer; Winners: Horacio and Jennifer; Elimination Challenge: The celebrities must make a pasta dish from scratch.: Winner: Graciela; Eliminated: Scarlet
6	6	"Drama, sabor y diversion"	August 16, 2022	0.87
Immunity Challenge: The celebrities were given 60 minutes to create a dish that reminds them of their families. The winner received immunity from elimination and became a captain for the next team challenge.: Winner: Aída; Quickfire Challenge: The celebrities work in pairs to prepare a dish inspired by a place in the world; the countries were randomly assigned via knife draw. The winners received immunity from elimination and became captains for the next team challenge.: Chiky, Lambda; Cristina, Luis; Ferdinando, Horacio; Graciela, Jennifer; Gregorio, Rodrigo; Héctor, Zuleyka; Marlene, Mauricio; Winners: Héctor and Zuleyka
7	7	"Misión imposible"	August 17, 2022	1.00
Quickfire Challenge: Team captains Aída, Héctor and Zuleyka were challenged to create a dish featuring beans. The winner was able to choose the members of their team.: Winner: Zuleyka; Team Challenge: The celebrities were tested on their communication skills by playing a game of telephone with each other. The celebrities had to replicate three dishes created by the judges using only their verbal and written descriptions as guidance. Each member of the team took a 15-minute turn in the kitchen. The winners received immunity from elimination.: Yellow Team: Zuleyka (C), Gregorio, Horacio, Lambda, Mauricio; Burgundy Team: Aída (C), Ferdinando, Graciela, Marlene, Rodrigo; Green Team: Héctor (C), Chiky, Cristina, Jennifer, Luis; Winners: Zuleyka, Gregorio, Horacio, Lambda, Mauricio
8	8	"Al borde del precipicio"	August 18, 2022	0.98
Safety Challenge: Inspired by the film Beast, the celebrities were asked to prepare a dish using a chili pepper chosen randomly. The winner was safe from elimination.: Winner: Rodrigo; Elimination Challenge: The bottom seven celebrities had the free challenge to prepare a dish full of creativity.: Eliminated: Jennifer
9	9	"Banquete con nervios de acero"	August 19, 2022	0.97
The celebrities working in pairs assigned via knife draw, were challenged with preparing the judges favorite breakfast dishes. The top two pairs won the advantage of choosing three more celebrities to join their team in the next team challenge.: Aída, Ferdinando; Chiky, Héctor; Cristina, Marlene; Graciela, Horacio; Gregorio, Rodrigo; Luis, Lambda; Mauricio, Zuleyka; Winners: Aída, Ferdinando, Chiky, Héctor; Team Challenge: The celebrities catered two weddings (25 guests to be served per team). Each team prepared a different menu for each wedding. The Green Team had the advantage of choosing which wedding to cater. The teams were given 30 minutes to plan, and 90 minutes of preparation time. The winning team received immunity from elimination, while the losing team was sent to the next elimination challenge.: Green Team: Mauricio (C), Aída, Ferdinando, Chiky, Héctor, Lambda, Zuleyka; Burgundy Team: Marlene (C), Cristina, Graciela, Horacio, Gregorio, Luis, Rodrigo; Winners: Mauricio, Aída, Ferdinando, Chiky, Héctor, Lambda, Zuleyka
10	10	"Uno menos"	August 22, 2022	1.06
Safety Challenge: The celebrities were asked to prepare a dessert inspired by their worst nightmare. The winner was safe from elimination.: Winner: Cristina; Elimination Challenge: The celebrities were challenged with preparing a soup, broth, or chowder.: Winners: Rodrigo, Gregorio; Eliminated: Luis
11	11	"Superar el rechazo"	August 23, 2022	0.97
Quickfire Challenge: The celebrities were asked to prepare three tacos and two salsas. Each celebrity was given five minutes to shop in the pantry. The celebrities had to swap cooking stations and cook with the other's ingredients. The winner received immunity from elimination.: Winner: Horacio; Immunity Challenge: The celebrities, working in teams, were challenged with preparing a dish with an ingredient that children dislike the most. The teams and their ingredient were randomly assigned via knife draw. The winners received immunity from elimination.: Anchovies: Cristina, Graciela, Lambda; Broccoli: Aída, Mauricio, Zuleyka; Celery: Chiky, Gregorio, Rodrigo; Spinach: Ferdinando, Héctor, Marlene; Winners: Chiky, Gregorio, Rodrigo
12	12	"Viva la fritanga"	August 24, 2022	1.08
Quickfire Challenge: The winners of the challenges in the previous episode were named team captains. They were challenged with making French fries. The winner would get the first pick in choosing members of their team.: Winner: Rodrigo; Team Challenge: The celebrities were asked to make three hamburgers, each one representing the personality of the judges. The winning team received immunity from elimination.: Yellow Team: Rodrigo (C), Ferdinando, Lambda, Mauricio; Green Team: Chiky (C), Héctor, Zuleyka; Blue Team: Gregorio (C), Aída, Marlene; Burgundy Team: Horacio (C), Cristina, Graciela; Winners: Gregorio, Aída, Marlene
13	13	"Perder para ganar"	August 25, 2022	1.04
Safety Challenge: The celebrities in the bottom were given 75 minutes to prepare a dish with the protein of their choice. In order to pay for the protein they wanted, the celebrities had to give up minutes from their cooking time. The winner was safe from elimination. The protein chosen and minutes reduced from their cooking time were: Cristina: Ribeye steak for 25 minutes; Ferdinando: Pork ribs for 20 minutes; Graciela: Beef shanks for 15 minutes; Héctor: Sardines for 10 minutes; Lambda: Bass for 30 minutes; Mauricio: Quail for 20 minutes; Zuleyka: Octopus for 10 minutes; Winner: Lambda; Elimination Challenge: The celebrities were given 60 minutes to prepare a tamale.: Winners: Cristina, Héctor; Eliminated: Graciela
14	14	"Homenaje al "Divo de Juárez""	August 26, 2022	1.04
The remaining twelve celebrities were split into six pairs, randomly assigned via knife draw, and competed in head-to-head battles to determine the two teams for the next team challenge. In the battles, the celebrities were asked to prepare a dishes inspired by Juan Gabriel's life. The winners of each battle formed one team and the losers the other team. The head-to-head battles were (winners noted in **bold**): Carnitas: Mauricio and **Zuleyka**; Burrito: **Cristina** and Gregorio; Tapas: **Chiky** and Rodrigo; Salmon: **Héctor** and Lambda; Morisqueta: **Ferdinando** and Marlene; Thai dish: Aída and **Horacio**; Team Challenge: The teams were challenged with preparing a dish in tribute to Juan Gabriel. The winning team received immunity from elimination, while the losing team was sent to the next elimination challenge.: Green Team: Chiky, Cristina, Ferdinando, Héctor, Horacio, Zuleyka; Yellow Team: Aída, Gregorio, Lambda, Marlene, Mauricio, Rodrigo; Winners: Aída, Gregorio, Lambda, Marlene, Mauricio, Rodrigo
15	15	"Llanto en la cocina"	August 29, 2022	0.90
Safety Challenge: The celebrities in the bottom were given 60 minutes to prepare four different snacks for the judges and host Carmen, using Ritz Crackers as their base. The winner was safe from elimination.: Winner: Cristina; Elimination Challenge: The celebrities were asked to prepare a seafood dish in 60 minutes.: Eliminated: Héctor
16	16	"La dulce inmunidad"	August 30, 2022	0.90
Quickfire Challenge: The celebrities had to prepare a dish with chocolate as the main ingredient. The winner received immunity from elimination and became a captain in the next team challenge.: Winner: Horacio; Quickfire Challenge: The celebrities, working in pairs, were challenged with preparing a dish that combined two of the five basic tastes. The tastes were randomly assigned via knife draw. The winning pair became captains in the next team challenge.: Aída (Bitterness), Gregorio (Umami); Chiky (Sourness), Zuleyka (Sweetness); Cristina (Saltiness), Lambda (Sweetness); Ferdinando (Bitterness), Marlene (Umami); Mauricio (Sourness), Rodrigo (Saltiness); Winners: Chiky and Zuleyka
17	17	"A jugar, 'Verdad o Reto'"	August 31, 2022	1.19
Team captains Chiky, Horacio, and Zuleyka had to prepare a liver and onions dish in 20 minutes. The celebrities were unable to shop in the pantry. The winner would get the first pick in choosing members of their team.: Winner: Horacio; Team Challenge: The celebrities competed in a "black box challenge". The celebrities were first split into teams. After entering the black box, which covered the celebrities in total darkness, each team member had one minute to taste, smell, and feel a mystery dish. Once their time expired, another team member had one minute to do the same. Once all members had a turn in the black box they began trying to recreate the dish. The winner received immunity from elimination.: Blue Team: Horacio (C), Ferdinando, Gregorio, Marlene; Burgundy Team: Zuleyka (C), Cristina, Lambda, Rodrigo; Green Team: Chiky (C), Aída, Mauricio; Winners: Chiky, Aída, Mauricio
18	18	"Proteína de alto riesgo"	September 1, 2022	0.94
Safety Challenge: The celebrities were asked to prepare a rabbit dish in 60 minutes. The celebrities first had to roll dice to determine the number of ingredients they were allowed to use. The top two celebrities were safe from elimination.: Winners: Cristina, Zuleyka; Elimination Challenge: The celebrities were given 45 minutes to prepare chicken wings.: Winners: Ferdinando, Gregorio, Rodrigo; Eliminated: Lambda
19	19	"Pecados imperdonables"	September 2, 2022	1.02
Skills Challenge: The top 10 celebrities competed in a skills challenge of three stages: prepare a fresh salsa, a cooked salsa, and a hollandaise or béarnaise sauce. The first five celebrities to complete the three stages formed one team for the Restaurant Wars challenge and the remaining five formed the second team. Restaurant Wars Challenge: In the second Restaurant Wars challenge of the season, the contestants were split into two teams and were responsible for running a food truck. The teams were led by Marlene and Rodrigo. Each team and had to prepare one type of sandwich and a side dish. Marlene's team had the advantage of choosing which type of sandwich to prepare. The judges decided that both teams failed the challenge and sent both to the elimination challenge.: Pork Sandwich: Marlene (C), Aída, Chiky, Ferdinando, Mauricio; Chicken Sandwich: Rodrigo (C), Cristina, Gregorio, Horacio, Zuleyka
20	20	"Todos corren peligro"	September 5, 2022	1.14
Safety Challenge: The celebrities working in pairs assigned via knife draw, were challenged with preparing a dish using mushrooms as the main ingredient of the dish. The winners were safe from elimination and became a captain for the next team challenge.: Aída, Gregorio; Chiky, Rodrigo; Cristina, Zuleyka; Ferdinando, Mauricio; Horacio, Marlene; Winners: Cristina, Zuleyka, Ferdinando, Mauricio; Elimination Challenge: The celebrities were asked to prepare a dish using bananas as the main ingredient of the dish.: Eliminated: Horacio
21	21	"Preparando con amor"	September 6, 2022	1.02
Immunity Challenge: The celebrities were asked to prepare a dessert inspired by a memorable romantic date. The winner received immunity from elimination.: Winner: Rodrigo; The celebrities, working in pairs, were asked to prepare a dish using beef cuts. The pairs and their cuts of beef were assigned by Rodrigo. The winning pair became captains in the next team challenge.: Aída, Cristina; Chiky, Mauricio; Ferdinando, Zuleyka; Gregorio, Marlene; Winners: Chiky, Mauricio
22	22	"La ruleta de la suerte"	September 7, 2022	1.14
Quickfire Challenge: Team captains Rodrigo, Chiky, and Mauricio were challenged with preparing a meal that was randomly assigned by a slot machine. The slot machine assigned the protein, side dish, sauce, and preparation time of the meal. The winner got the first pick in choosing members of their team.: Winner: Mauricio; Team Challenge: The celebrities were split into teams of three. Each member of the teams was asked to prepare a dish individually. The team captains had to taste the three dishes prepared by their team and choose which one to present to the judges. The winning team received immunity from elimination.: Burgundy Team: Mauricio (C), Aída, Cristina; Blue Team: Chiky (C), Ferdinando, Zuleyka; Green Team: Rodrigo (C), Gregorio, Marlene; Winners: Rodrigo, Gregorio, Marlene
23	23	"Un sueño que termina"	September 8, 2022	1.06
Safety Challenge: The celebrities in the bottom were challenged with preparing a cake using one of six available ingredients. The top two cakes were safe from elimination.: Winners: Chiky, Ferdinando; Elimination Challenge: The celebrities were given 60 minutes to prepare risotto.: Eliminated: Aída
24	24	"Bienvenidos"	September 9, 2022	1.01
Re-entry Challenge: Previously eliminated celebrities competed against each other for a chance to re-enter the competition. The celebrities were given 60 minutes to cook fish.: Winners: Lambda, Héctor; Team Challenge: The celebrities visit a coffee plantation and were given 75 minutes to prepare a dish for six guests, with coffee as the main ingredient. The winning team received immunity from elimination, while the losing team was sent to the next elimination challenge.: Blue Team: Héctor (C), Gregorio, Marlene, Rodrigo, Zuleyka; Yellow Team: Lambda (C), Chiky, Cristina, Ferdinando, Mauricio; Winners: Lambda, Chiky, Cristina, Ferdinando, Mauricio
25	25	"Quesadillas de pesadilla"	September 12, 2022	1.00
Safety Challenge: The celebrities were asked to prepare quesadillas. The winners was safe from elimination.: Winner: Rodrigo; Elimination Challenge: The celebrities were challenged with cooking any dish.: Winner: Marlene; Eliminated: Gregorio
26	26	"Cata a ciegas"	September 13, 2022	1.07
Immunity Challenge: The celebrities were given 60 minutes to cook any dish with the help of guest judge Alfonso Cadena. The judges tasted the dishes without knowing who cooked them. The winner received immunity from elimination.: Winner: Ferdinando; Quickfire Challenge: The celebrities worked in pairs to prepare a dish inspired by a proverb. The pairs and proverb were randomly assigned via envelopes. The winning pair became members of Ferdinando's team in the next team challenge.: Chiky, Marlene; Cristina, Mauricio; Héctor, Rodrigo; Lambda, Zuleyka; Winners: Lambda, Zuleyka
27	27	"Entre gustos y colores"	September 14, 2022	1.05
Quickfire Challenge: The celebrities were given 30 minutes to prepare a creative hot dog. The top three celebrities formed the second team in the next team challenge and the remaining celebrities formed the third team.: Winners: Chiky, Cristina, Mauricio; Team Challenge: The celebrities were asked to prepare a vegetarian version of cochinita pibil, tacos al pastor and meatballs. The winning team received immunity from elimination.: Blue Team: Chiky, Cristina, Mauricio; Burgundy Team: Ferdinando, Lambda, Zuleyka; Green Team: Héctor, Marlene, Rodrigo; Winners: Chiky, Cristina, Mauricio
28	28	"El peso de lo inesperado"	September 15, 2022	0.95
Safety Challenge: The celebrities were given 60 minutes to cook any dish but the total weight of their ingredients had to be less than five pounds. Each celebrity was given three minutes to shop in the pantry.: Winner: Lambda; Elimination Challenge: The celebrities were given 75 minutes to prepare a pizza. The winner was safe from elimination.: Eliminated: Rodrigo
29	29	"Sabor a hispanidad"	September 16, 2022	0.83
Quickfire Challenge: The celebrities were asked to prepare a dish that represents them. The top three celebrities became captains in the team challenge.: Winners: Mauricio, Lambda, Zuleyka; Team Challenge: The celebrities were given 60 minutes to prepare a sweet or savory dish with corn as the main ingredient of the dish. The judges decided not send any team to the elimination challenge, as all teams performed well.: Blue Team: Lambda (C), Cristina, Héctor; Green Team: Zuleyka (C), Ferdinando, Zuleyka; Yellow Team: Mauricio (C), Marlene, Chiky
30	30	"Cuenta regresiva"	September 19, 2022	0.98
Quickfire Challenge: Working in pairs assigned via knife draw, the celebrities were challenged with preparing a dish that used the judges and host Carmen's favorite ingredients. The top two pairs were able to compete for immunity.: Chiky, Zuleyka; Cristina, Lambda; Ferdinando, Mauricio; Héctor, Marlene; Winners: Chiky, Zuleyka and Héctor, Marlene; Immunity Challenge: Chiky, Héctor, Marlene and Zuleyka were asked to prepare an empanada and a salsa. The winner was safe from elimination.: Winner: Zuleyka
31	31	"Oído chef"	September 20, 2022	1.09
Quickfire Challenge: The celebrities were asked to prepare any dish with the guidance of a professional chef who offered advice on their dishes. The celebrities were given 15 minutes to plan, and 60 minutes of preparation time. The top three celebrities were safe from elimination.: Winner: Cristina, Lambda, Chiky; Elimination Challenge: Ferdinando, Héctor, Marlene, and Mauricio were challenged with preparing any dish using only the ingredients available at their cooking stations and were not allowed to shop in the pantry.: Eliminated: Héctor
32	32	"Dulce y amargo"	September 21, 2022	1.18
Safety Challenge: The celebrities were given 75 minutes to prepare their own version of a classic dessert. The desserts were randomly assigned via knife draw. The top three celebrities were safe from elimination and advanced to the semifinals.: Cheesecake: Chiky; Chocoflan: Ferdinando; Donuts: Lambda; Lemon Pie: Zuleyka; Swiss roll: Cristina; Tres leches cake: Mauricio; Tiramisu: Marlene; Winners: Cristina, Lambda, Zuleyka; Elimination Challenge: The celebrities were given 60 minutes to prepare a complete meal that included a protein, side dish, and sauce.: Eliminated: Marlene
33	33	"Cocina con magia"	September 22, 2022	1.01
Semifinal: The top 6 celebrities were asked to prepare two servings of the same dish for the judges and three guests, with a knife draw deciding the order in which they presented their dishes. The winner advanced to the finale.: Winner: Lambda
34	34	"Un nivel de excelencia"	September 23, 2022	1.17
Semifinal: Chiky, Cristina, Ferdinando, Mauricio, and Zuleyka took over the kitchen of a real restaurant under the guidance of chef Juan Manuel and served the judges and five guests. Each celebrity was in charge of preparing one of the five dishes on the menu. The top three celebrities advanced to the finale.: Eliminated: Chiky and Ferdinando
35	35	"Una experiencia incomparable"	September 26, 2022	1.26
The four finalists each prepared a three-course meal that included an appetizer, the main course, and a dessert.: Winner: Lambda; Runners-up: Cristina, Mauricio, Zuleyka
