= Jose Gumbs =

American football player (born 1988)

No. 48
- Position: Safety

Personal information
- Born: April 20, 1988 (age 38); Queens, New York, U.S.
- Listed height: 5 ft 10 in (1.78 m)
- Listed weight: 210 lb (95 kg)

Career information
- High school: Hebron (ME)
- College: Monmouth
- NFL draft: 2012: undrafted

Career history
- New Orleans Saints (2012)*; Kansas City Chiefs (2012-2013)*; Washington Redskins (2013)
- * Offseason or practice squad member only

Career NFL statistics
- Tackles: 6
- Pass deflections: 1
- Interceptions: 1
- Stats at Pro Football Reference

Jose Gumbs (born April 20, 1988) is an American former professional football player who was a safety in the National Football League (NFL). He was signed by the New Orleans Saints as an undrafted free agent in 2012. He began playing football at Hebron Academy and later for Monmouth University at the collegiate level. He was also a member of the Kansas City Chiefs and Washington Redskins.

== Professional career ==
=== New Orleans Saints ===
Gumbs signed with the New Orleans Saints after not being selected in the 2012 NFL draft on April 30, 2012. The Saints released him on September 7.

=== Kansas City Chiefs ===
The Kansas City Chiefs signed Gumbs to their practice squad on December 5, 2012.

=== Washington Redskins ===
Gumbs was signed by the Washington Redskins on July 25, 2013. He made his NFL debut in Week 6 against the Dallas Cowboys. In his second career game, Gumbs made an explosive special teams tackle against the kick returner Eric Weems. He would have his first career start against the Denver Broncos in Week 8 with starting safeties Brandon Meriweather suspended and Reed Doughty out with a concussion. Gumbs made his first career interception against Matt Ryan, quarterback of the Atlanta Falcons.

On March 3, 2014, the Redskins re-signed Gumbs to a one-year, $495,000 contract. He was released on May 17, 2014.
