= Juan Manuel Barrientos Valencia =

Colombian chef and businessman (born 1983)

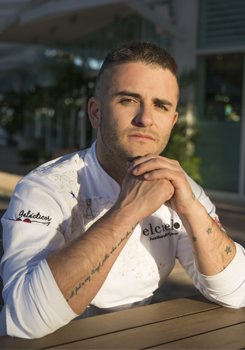
- Occupation: businessman
- Known for: founder of El Cielo restaurant chain

Juan Manuel Barrientos Valencia is a Colombian chef and businessman.

== Early life and education ==
Juan Manuel was born in Medellin, Colombia. He studied at Colegiatura Colombiana in Medellin and Mariano Moreno in Buenos Aires. He is also recognized as "Juanma.”

He founded the El Cielo restaurant chain in 2006. In 2015, Juan opened the original Elcielo Miami which received Michelin star in Florida's first-ever Michelin Guide in 2022.

== Awards and recognition ==
He has been named one of the 50 best chefs of Latin America, and was awarded the Revelation Chef Award by Madrid Fusion.

He is the recipient of Michelin Award.

== Advocate of Peace ==
One of his projects is translated as "In El Cielo, we are cooking up peace in Colombia" ("En El Cielo, estamos cocinando la paz de Colombia").
