= Top Chef VIP season 4 =

Top Chef VIP
- Season 4
- Hosted by: Carmen Villalobos
- Judges: Antonio de Livier; Inés Páez Nin; Betty Vázquez
- No. of contestants: 20
- Winner: Cristina Porta
- No. of episodes: 66

Release
- Original network: Telemundo
- Original release: July 22 – October 6, 2025

Season chronology
- ← Previous; Season 3 Next → Season 5

The fourth season of the American competitive reality television series Top Chef VIP premiered on Telemundo on July 22, 2025. The season was announced on May 8, 2025. Carmen Villalobos returned as host. Antonio de Livier and Inés Páez Nin returned as judges, with Betty Vázquez replacing Belén Alonso as the third judge.

The season was won by Cristina Porta, who received US$200,000.

== Contestants ==
Twenty celebrities were selected to compete in Top Chef VIP. The first group of celebrities was announced on July 1, 2025. The second group of celebrities was announced on July 8, 2025.

Name	Age	Hometown	Notability
Angélica Celaya	43	Tucson, Arizona	Actress
Celinee Santos	25	Santo Domingo, Dominican Republic	Miss Dominican Republic 2024
Christopher Vélez	29	Loja, Ecuador	Singer
Cristina Porta	35	Lleida, Spain	Journalist & TV personality
Elvis Crespo	53	Guaynabo, Puerto Rico	Singer
Héctor Sandarti	57	Guatemala City, Guatemala	TV host
Jerry Bazúa	40	Culiacán, Mexico	Singer
Juan Soler	59	San Miguel de Tucumán, Argentina	Actor
Karina Moreno	56	Venezuela	Singer
Lorena Herrera	58	Mazatlán, Mexico	Actress & singer
Matías Ochoa	26	San Luis, Argentina	Influencer
Nicole Curiel	23	Mexico City, Mexico	Actress
Norkys Batista	47	Caracas, Venezuela	Actress
Paco Pizaña	35	Poza Rica, Mexico	Actor
Salvador Zerboni	46	Mexico City, Mexico	Actor
Sergio Goyri	66	Puebla, Mexico	Actor
Sergio Sendel	58	Mexico City, Mexico	Actor
Valeria Cuevas	29	Mexico City, Mexico	Singer
Yany Prado	34	Havana, Cuba	Actress
Zelma "Curvy" Cherem	33	Mexico City, Mexico	TV personality

== Contestant progress ==
Episode #		1	2		3		4		5	6		7		8		9		10		11	12		13		14		15		16		17	18		19		20		21		22		23	24		25		26		27		28		29	30		31		32		33		34		35	36		37		38		39		40		41	42		43		44		45		46		47		48		49		50		51		52		53		54		55		56		57		58		59		60		61		62		63			64	65	66
1	Cristina	HIGH	IN	WIN	WIN	IN	IN	—	WIN	IMM	IMM	WIN	—	IN	WIN	IMM	IMM	IN	—	WIN	IMM	IMM	WIN	HIGH	IN	WIN	IMM	IMM	IN	—	LOW	WIN	IMM	IN	—	IN	WIN	IMM	IMM	WIN	IMM	IMM	IMM	IMM	WIN	WIN	IMM	IMM	IMM	IMM	IN	—	LOW	IN	—	HIGH	IN	WIN	IMM	IN	—	IN	—	LOW	WIN	IMM	IN	—	WIN	IMM	WIN	IN	IN	—	LOW	WIN	IMM	IN	—	WIN	IMM	IMM	IMM	WIN	IN	IMM	IMM	IMM	IMM	WIN	HIGH	IN	—	WIN	IMM	WIN	WIN	IMM	IMM	IMM	IMM	IN	—	WIN	WIN	IMM	IMM	IMM	IMM	WIN	IN	WIN	WIN	IMM	IMM	IMM	IMM	IMM	IMM	IMM	IN	WIN	WINNER
2	Lorena	HIGH	IN	WIN	WIN	HIGH	IN	—	WIN	IMM	IMM	IN	—	WIN	IMM	IMM	IMM	IN	—	WIN	IMM	IMM	WIN	WIN	IMM	IMM	IMM	IMM	WIN	IN	LOW	IN	WIN	IN	—	IN	WIN	IMM	IMM	IN	IN	LOW	WIN	IMM	IN	—	WIN	IMM	IMM	IMM	WIN	HIGH	WIN	WIN	HIGH	HIGH	WIN	IMM	IMM	WIN	IN	WIN	IN	—	IN	IN	WIN	IN	IN	WIN	WIN	IN	WIN	IN	LOW	IN	IN	IN	IN	IN	IN	IN	IN	WIN	IN	IMM	IMM	IMM	IMM	WIN	IN	WIN	WIN	IMM	IMM	IN	—	WIN	IN	IN	IN	IN	—	WIN	IN	WIN	IN	IN	WIN	WIN	WIN	IMM	IMM	IMM	IMM	IMM	IMM	IMM	IMM	IMM	IN	WIN	RUNNER-UP
2	Paco	IN	IN	NOM	—	—	IN	—	NOM	WIN	IMM	IN	—	IN	WIN	IMM	IMM	WIN	IN	WIN	IMM	IMM	WIN	IN	IN	LOW	WIN	IMM	WIN	WIN	IMM	IMM	IMM	IN	IN	IN	WIN	IMM	IMM	WIN	IMM	IMM	IMM	IMM	WIN	IN	HIGH	WIN	IMM	IMM	IN	—	LOW	WIN	WIN	IMM	IMM	IMM	IMM	WIN	WIN	IMM	IMM	IMM	IMM	IMM	IN	—	HIGH	WIN	WIN	WIN	IMM	IMM	IMM	IMM	IMM	IN	IN	IN	IN	IN	OUT			IN	IN	WIN	WIN	WIN	IN	IN	—	WIN	IMM	WIN	IN	IN	—	WIN	IMM	WIN	WIN	IMM	IMM	IMM	IMM	IMM	IMM	IN	—	IN	—	WIN	IN	WIN	WIN	IMM	IMM	IMM	IN	WIN	RUNNER-UP
2	Salvador	IN	IN	WIN	LOW	—	IN	—	WIN	IMM	IMM	IN	—	IN	IN	IN	IN	IN	—	LOW	IN	IN	IN	—	IN	LOW	WIN	IMM	WIN	WIN	IMM	IMM	IMM	IN	IN	IN	WIN	IMM	IMM	IN	IN	WIN	IMM	IMM	IN	—	IN	IN	WIN	IMM	WIN	IN	LOW	WIN	HIGH	LOW	—	WIN	IMM	IN	—	WIN	WIN	IMM	IMM	IMM	WIN	IN	IN	WIN	IN	—	IN	—	WIN	IMM	IMM	IN	—	IN	IN	WIN	IMM	WIN	WIN	IMM	IMM	IMM	IMM	IMM	IMM	IMM	IMM	IMM	IMM	IN	—	WIN	IN	WIN	IMM	WIN	IN	IN	—	WIN	WIN	IMM	IMM	IN	—	WIN	IN	IN	—	WIN	IN	IN	—	WIN	WIN	IMM	RUNNER-UP
5	Angélica	IN	IN	WIN	—	—	IN	—	WIN	IMM	IMM	IN	—	IN	IN	IN	WIN	IN	—	LOW	IN	IN	IN	—	IN	WIN	IMM	IMM	IN	—	WIN	IMM	IMM	WIN	WIN	IMM	IMM	IMM	IMM	WIN	IMM	WIN	IMM	IMM	IN	—	IN	IN	WIN	IMM	WIN	WIN	IMM	IMM	IMM	IMM	IMM	IMM	IMM	IN	—	WIN	IN	WIN	IMM	IMM	IN	—	HIGH	WIN	IN	—	IN	—	HIGH	IN	IN	WIN	WIN	IMM	IMM	IMM	IMM	WIN	IN	IMM	IMM	IMM	IMM	WIN	IN	WIN	WIN	IMM	IMM	WIN	IN	WIN	WIN	IMM	IMM	WIN	IN	IN	—	IN	—	IN	IN	—	—	IN	—	WIN	WIN	IMM	IMM	IMM	IMM	IMM	IN	OUT	
5	Matías	HIGH	IN	WIN	LOW	—	IN	—	LOW	WIN	IMM	WIN	IN	IN	IN	WIN	IMM	WIN	IN	LOW	IN	LOW	IN	—	IN	LOW	IN	IN	IN	—	LOW	WIN	IMM	WIN	IN	IN	IN	IN	IN	IN	LOW	WIN	IMM	IMM	WIN	IN	IN	IN	WIN	IMM	WIN	IN	WIN	WIN	IN	HIGH	IN	IN	LOW	IN	—	IN	—	WIN	IMM	IMM	IN	—	IN	WIN	IN	—	WIN	WIN	LOW	IN	IN	IN	—	IN	WIN	IMM	IMM	WIN	IN	IMM	IMM	IMM	IMM	IN	—	IN	—	IN	LOW	IN	—	WIN	WIN	IMM	IMM	IN	—	IN	—	WIN	IN	IN	IN	—	—	IN	—	IN	—	IN	—	WIN	WIN	IMM	IN	OUT	
7	Yany	IN	IN	LOW	WIN	WIN	IMM	LOW	LOW	WIN	IMM	IN	—	IN	IN	WIN	IMM	WIN	IN	LOW	WIN	IMM	IN	—	IN	WIN	IMM	IMM	IN	—	WIN	IMM	IMM	—	—	—	—	—	—	—	—	—	—	—	WDR																																									WIN	IMM	IMM	IMM	WIN	WIN	IMM	IMM	IMM	IMM	WIN	IN	IN	—	IN	WIN	IN	—	WIN	IN	IN	—	WIN	IMM	WIN	IN	WIN	IN	WIN	IN	WIN	IN	WIN	IN	OUT			
8	Juan	WIN	IMM	IMM	IMM	IMM	IMM	IMM	IMM	IMM	IMM	IN	—	IN	IN	WIN	IMM	IN	—	LOW	WIN	IMM	WIN	HIGH	WIN	IMM	IMM	IMM	IN	—	WIN	IMM	IMM	WIN	IN	WIN	IMM	IMM	IMM	IN	LOW	WIN	IMM	IMM	IN	—	HIGH	WIN	IMM	IMM	WIN	IN	LOW	WIN	IN	HIGH	WIN	IMM	IMM	WIN	IN	WIN	IN	LOW	IN	IN	WIN	WIN	IMM	IMM	IMM	IMM	WIN	IMM	IMM	IMM	IMM	—	—	IN	IN	IN	IN	WIN	IN	IMM	IMM	IMM	IMM	IN	—	WIN	IN	WIN	IMM	WIN	IN	IN	—	IN	IN	IN	—	—	—	—	—	WDR															
9	Valeria	IN	IN	LOW	WIN	IN	IN	—	LOW	IN	WIN	IN	—	IN	IN	WIN	IMM	IN	—	LOW	IN	WIN	IN	—	IN	WIN	IMM	IMM	—	—	WIN	IMM	IMM	IN	—	IN	IN	IN	OUT																																															IN	WIN	IMM	IMM	IN	—	IN	—	IN	WIN	IN	—	IN	—	IN	OUT																						
10	Curvy	IN	IN	WIN	WIN	IN	IN	—	WIN	IMM	IMM	WIN	IN	IN	WIN	IMM	IMM	WIN	IN	WIN	IMM	IMM	WIN	IN	WIN	IMM	IMM	IMM	WIN	IN	WIN	IMM	IMM	IN	—	WIN	IMM	IMM	IMM	WIN	IMM	LOW	IN	LOW	IN	—	WIN	IMM	IMM	IMM	IN	—	WIN	IN	—	WIN	IMM	IMM	IMM	IN	—	IN	—	WIN	IMM	IMM	WIN	IN	IN	WIN	WIN	IN	WIN	IN	LOW	IN	IN	IN	IN	IN	IN	IN	IN	WIN	IN	IMM	IMM	IMM	IMM	IN	—	WIN	IN	IN	OUT																												
11	Celinee	IN	IN	LOW	WIN	IN	IN	—	LOW	IN	LOW	IN	—	IN	IN	—	—	—	—	—	—	—	—	—	—	—	—	—	WIN	IN	LOW	—	LOW	IN	—	WIN	—	—	IN	WIN	IMM	LOW	IN	WIN	WIN	IN	IN	IN	IN	IN	WIN	IN	WIN	IN	—	LOW	—	IN	WIN	WIN	IN	IN	—	LOW	IN	OUT																				IN	HIGH	IN																																			
12	Nicole	IN	IN	WIN	WIN	IN	IN	—	WIN	IMM	IMM	IN	IN	IN	WIN	IMM	IMM	WIN	WIN	IMM	IMM	IMM	IN	—	IMM	IMM	IMM	IMM	IN	—	LOW	IN	WIN	—	—	IN	IN	IN	LOW	IN	IN	LOW	WIN	IMM	IN	—	IN	IN	IN	IN	IN	—	WIN	WIN	IN	LOW	—	IN	OUT																											IN	IN	IN																																			
13	Norkys	HIGH	IN	LOW	WIN	IN	IN	—	WIN	IMM	IMM	IN	—	IN	IN	WIN	IMM	IN	—	LOW	IN	LOW	IN	—	IN	LOW	IN	IN	IN	—	LOW	IN	LOW	IN	—	IN	IN	WIN	IMM	WIN	IMM	WIN	IMM	IMM	WIN	IN	IN	IN	IN	OUT																																				IN	IN	WIN	IN																																		
14	Héctor	IN	IN	WIN	LOW	—	IN	—	WIN	IMM	IMM	IN	—	IN	IN	IN	IN	IN	—	WIN	IMM	IMM	WIN	IN	IN	LOW	IN	IN	IN	—	WIN	IMM	IMM	—	—	—	—	—	WIN	IN	IN	LOW	IN	OUT																																																																															
15	Jerry	IN	IN	NOM	—	—	IN	—	NOM	IN	WIN	WIN	IN	IN	IN	IN	IN	WIN	IN	WIN	IMM	IMM	IN	—	IN	LOW	WIN	IMM	—	—	WIN	IMM	IMM	IN	—	WIN	IMM	IMM	IMM	IN	OUT																																													IN	IN	IN																																			
16	Sergio S.	IN	IN	LOW	LOW	—	WIN	WIN	IMM	IMM	IMM	WIN	WIN	IMM	IMM	IMM	IMM	IN	—	WIN	IMM	IMM	IN	—	IN	WIN	IMM	IMM	WIN	IN	LOW	IN	OUT																																																																																										
17	Elvis	IN	WIN	IMM	LOW	—	IN	—	LOW	IN	LOW	IN	—	IN	IN	IN	IN	—	—	—	WIN	IMM	IN	—	IN	WIN	IMM	WDR																																																																																															
18	Karina	HIGH	IN	LOW	—	—	IN	—	LOW	IN	WIN	IN	—	WIN	IMM	IMM	IMM	WIN	IN	LOW	IN	OUT																																																																																																					
19	Christopher	IN	IN	WIN	LOW	—	IN	—	LOW	WIN	IMM	IN	—	IN	IN	IN	OUT																																																																	IN	IN	IN																																							
20	Sergio G.	IN	IN	WIN	LOW	—	IN	—	LOW	IN	OUT																																																																																																																

(WINNER) The chef won the season and was crowned "Top Chef".
(RUNNER-UP) The chef was a runner-up for the season.
(WIN) The celebrity won the Quickfire Challenge, Immunity Challenge, Safety Challenge, or Elimination Challenge.
(WIN) The celebrity was on the winning team in the Team Challenge and directly advanced to the next round.
(HIGH) The celebrity was selected as one of the top entries in an individual or team challenge, but did not win.
(IN) The celebrity was not selected as one of the top or bottom entries in an individual challenge and was safe.
(IN) The celebrity was not selected as a top or bottom entry in a Team Challenge.
(IMM) The celebrity didn't have to compete in that round of the competition and was safe from elimination.
(IMM) The celebrity had to compete in that round of the competition but was safe from elimination.
(—) The celebrity did not quality for a challenge.
(—) The celebrity was unable to participate due to personal reasons.
(LOW) The celebrity was selected as one of the bottom entries in an individual challenge, but was not eliminated.
(LOW) The celebrity was one of the bottom entries in a Team Challenge.
(NOM) The celebrity lost an individual or team challenge and was nominated for elimination.
(NOM) The celebrity was nominated for elimination but had to compete in that round of the competition.
(OUT) The celebrity lost the Elimination Challenge.
(WDR) The celebrity voluntarily withdrew from the competition.

== Episodes ==
No. overall	No. in season	Title	Original release date
156	1	"La primera inmunidad culinaria"	July 22, 2025
Quickfire Challenge: The celebrities had 60 minutes to prepare a dish that showcases who they are. The winner received immunity and a secret advantage.: Winner: Juan
157	2	"Celos, gritos y acusaciones"	July 23, 2025
Express Challenge: The celebrities competed in an express challenge of three stages: separate ten eggs, bread and fry three egg yolks, and whip egg whites by hand to stiff peaks. The winner didn't have to compete in the team challenge.: Winner: Elvis; Team Challenge: The teams had 75 minutes to prepare a cake with at least 4 layers of different colors, however, only one teammate could prepare the cake at a time. The losing team was nominated for elimination. Juan used his secret advantage to save Salvador and Sergio Goyri from nomination.: Aquamarine Team: Karina, Norkys; Blue Team: Salvador, Sergio G.; Brown Team: Celinee, Sergio S.; Maroon Team: Jerry, Paco; Green Team: Angélica, Lorena; Pink Team: Curvy, Nicole; Purple Team: Christopher, Héctor; Red Team: Valeria, Yany; Yellow Team: Cristina, Matías; Nominated: Jerry and Paco
158	3	"Personajes de película contrarreloj"	July 24, 2025
Team Challenge: The celebrities competed in a The Bad Guys 2-sponsored challenge, where each team had to prepare a three-course meal inspired by characters from the film. Héctor solved a puzzle to take off 20 minutes from the female team's cooking time. The winning team moved on to the Immunity Challenge.: Female Team: Lorena (C), Celinee, Cristina, Curvy, Nicole, Norkys, Valeria, Yany; Male Team: Sergio G. (C), Christopher, Elvis, Héctor, Matías, Salvador, Sergio S.; Winners: Lorena, Celinee, Cristina, Curvy, Nicole, Norkys, Valeria, Yany; Immunity Challenge: The celebrities were given 60 minutes to cook any dish. The pantry was open for three minutes. Afterwards, the celebrities had to swap cooking stations and cook with the other's ingredients. The winner received immunity from elimination.: Winner: Yany
159	4	"El robo de la inmunidad"	July 25, 2025
The celebrities had 45 minutes to prepare two empanadas. Juan and Yany blind tasted them and unknowingly chose their opponent for the Immunity Heist. The winner also received a secret advantage.: Winner: Sergio S.; Immunity Heist: Juan, Yany and Sergio Sendel were give 45 minutes to cook any dish. Sergio decided to challenge Yany's dish and stole her immunity.: Winner: Sergio S.
160	5	"Sabor español en un pueblo colonial"	July 27, 2025
Quickfire Challenge: In the first stage, Juan and Sergio Sendel were asked to prepare two different tapas, with the winner assigning two celebrities to each team. In the second stage, the two members of each team prepared three different types of tapas, with the winners picking three more celebrities for each team. In the final round, three teammates prepared four tapas and the winning team assigned the final four members for each team. Team Challenge: The teams were asked to prepare a three-course meal for 100 guests. The meal consisted of a tapas-style appetizer, paella for the main course and the dessert of their choice. The winning team received immunity from elimination, while the losing team was sent to the elimination challenge.: Maroon Team: Juan (C), Angélica, Cristina, Curvy, Héctor, Lorena, Nicole, Norkys, Paco, Salvador; Yellow Team: Sergio S. (C), Celinee, Christopher, Elvis, Jerry, Karina, Matías, Sergio G., Valeria, Yany; Winners: Juan, Angélica, Cristina, Curvy, Héctor, Lorena, Nicole, Norkys, Paco, Salvador
161	6	"Primera eliminación a fuego alto"	July 28, 2025
Top Chef: Portland contestant Maria Mazon served as guest judge for this episode. Safety Challenge: The celebrities, working in pairs assigned via knife draw, were given 75 minutes to prepare a dish using an ingredient for which they had to bid on by giving up minutes of their cooking time. The pair that failed to buy an ingredient in the end kept the one that was left, but was subtracted the time of the pair that bid the most minutes. The top two pairs were safe from elimination.: Celinee, Sergio G.: Yuca for 10 minutes; Christopher, Matías: Pistachio for 45 minutes; Karina, Valeria: Octopus for 45 minutes; Paco, Yany: Chocolate for 15 minutes; Elvis, Jerry: Tomahawk steak for 40 minutes; Winners: Paco and Yany, Christopher and Matías; Elimination Challenge: The celebrities were given 60 minutes to prepare any dish.: Eliminated: Sergio Goyri
162	7	"Enfados, juegos de azar y lágrimas"	July 29, 2025
Top Chef VIP 2 winner Alana Lliteras served as guest judge for this episode. Quickfire Challenge: The celebrities, working in teams assigned via knife draw, had 60 minutes to prepare three servings of an appetizer and a main dish. Throughout the challenge, team captains could sabotage a team with challenges such as: peeling grapes, peeling bananas, slice 250 grams of onion, among others. The winners moved on to the Immunity Challenge.: Winners: Jerry, Cristina, Curvy, Matías, Sergio S.; Before the Immunity Challenge began, Sergio Sendel's secret advantage was revealed: to swap one of the celebrities who won the Quickfire Challenge for one who lost it. He decided to swap Cristina out for Nicole. Immunity Challenge: The celebrities had 60 minutes to cook any dish, with the pantry being open for three minutes. Afterwards, they had to roll a die and a spinning top. The die determined the number of ingredients and the spinning top determined what would happen to those ingredients. The results of their rolls were: Curvy: Remove 4 ingredients from Matías; Jerry: Remove 12 ingredients from Matías; Matías: Remove 2 ingredients from Curvy; Nicole: Exchange 4 ingredients with Matías; Sergio S.: Remove 2 ingredients from Jerry; Winner: Sergio S.
163	8	"Cabeza de uno y manos de otro"	July 30, 2025
Chef Grace Ramirez served as guest judge for this episode. Quickfire Challenge: The celebrities, working in pairs, had 60 minutes to cook any dish. However, the pairs had to share a coat, one teammate being the eyes and the other the hands while cooking. The winners were safe from elimination.: Winners: Karina and Lorena; Safety Challenge: The celebrities, working in teams, had 45 minutes to prepare a main dish and a dessert, but could only use the ingredients chosen by the judges. The winning team was safe from elimination.: Blue Team: Norkys (C), Christopher, Valeria, Yany; Green Team: Cristina (C), Curvy, Nicole, Paco; Maroon Team: Juan (C), Celinee, Elvis, Jerry; Yellow Team: Angélica (C), Héctor, Matías, Salvador; Winners: Cristina, Curvy, Nicole, Paco
164	9	"Salvar el cuello"	July 31, 2025
Safety Challenge: The celebrities, working in pairs, had 60 minutes to prepare two stuffed chicken necks, each with a different filling, as well as a side dish and sauce. The winners were safe from elimination.: Winners: Juan and Matías; Norkys, Valeria and Yany; Elimination Challenge: The celebrities were given 45 minutes to prepare a picada.: Winner: Angélica; Eliminated: Christopher
165	10	"Mercado a ciegas"	August 1, 2025
Quickfire Challenge: The celebrities, working in teams, had 60 minutes to prepare a main dish and a dessert. Two members of each team had three minutes to shop in the pantry, which was pitch black, while being guided by their teammates' voices. The top two teams advanced to the Immunity Challenge.: Winners: Curvy, Nicole, Paco and Yany; Jerry, Karina and Matías; Immunity Challenge: The celebrities were given 60 minutes to recreate a dish prepared by former Top Chef VIP judge Juan Manuel Barrientos. The winner received a secret advantage and immunity from elimination.: Winner: Nicole
166	11	"El dominio del fuego"	August 3, 2025
Express Challenge: The celebrities were asked to prepare salsa. Once a celebrity completed the challenge they were allowed to pick their team. Safety Challenge: The celebrities, working in teams, were given 60 minutes to grill meat, seafood, and vegetables. They also had to prepare three servings of a dessert. Chef Adrián Reyes served as guest judge. The winning team was safe from elimination.: Maroon Team: Nicole (C), Cristina, Curvy, Héctor, Jerry, Lorena, Paco, Sergio S.; Yellow Team: Angélica (C), Juan, Karina, Matías, Norkys, Salvador, Valeria, Yany; Winners: Nicole, Cristina, Curvy, Héctor, Jerry, Lorena, Paco, Sergio S.
167	12	"La sopa de la eliminación"	August 4, 2025
Before the Safety Challenge began, Nicole's secret advantage was revealed: to swap one celebrity in danger of elimination for one who is safe, swap two celebrities in danger and put herself at risk of elimination, or keep everything the same. She chose the third option. Safety Challenge: The celebrities at risk of elimination had 60 minutes to cook any dish, but an immune celebrity had to shop in the pantry for them. The top three celebrities were safe from elimination.: Winners: Juan, Elvis, Yany; Elimination Challenge: The celebrities were given 45 minutes to prepare three servings of a soup.: Winner: Valeria; Eliminated: Karina
168	13	"Demasiado corazón"	August 5, 2025
Quickfire Challenge: The celebrities worked in pairs to prepare a dish inspired by a proverb. The pairs and proverbs were assigned via envelopes. The top three teams advanced to the Immunity Challenge.: Winners: Juan and Lorena, Cristina and Curvy, Héctor and Paco; Immunity Challenge: The celebrities were randomly assigned the heart of a different ingredient and had 45 minutes to prepare their dish. The winner received a secret advantage and immunity from elimination.: Cristina: lamb; Curvy: chicken; Héctor: artichoke; Juan: beef; Lorena: pork; Paco: heart of palm; Winner: Lorena; After the Immunity Challenge ended, Lorena's secret advantage was revealed: share her immunity with another celebrity. She gave immunity to Nicole.
169	14	"Celia Cruz y los clásicos mexicanos"	August 6, 2025
Quickfire Challenge: The celebrities, working in trios and a duo assigned by Lorena, had 90 minutes to recreate chef Javier Azocar's Celia Cruz tribute cake on a smaller scale. The winners were safe from elimination.: Winners: Curvy and Juan; Safety Challenge: The celebrities, working in teams, were asked to prepare two traditional Mexican dishes with a modern twist. The winners were safe from elimination.: Maroon Team: Yany (C), Angélica, Cristina, Elvis, Sergio S., Valeria; Yellow Team: Matías (C), Héctor, Jerry, Norkys, Paco, Salvador; Winners: Yany, Angélica, Cristina, Elvis, Sergio S., Valeria
170	15	"Una eliminación inesperada"	August 7, 2025
Safety Challenge: The six celebrities at risk of elimination had 15 minutes to memorize a recipe from Chef Toño. They took turns reading the recipe, splitting the time to memorize it, and were given 45 minutes to prepare it. The top three celebrities were safe from elimination.: Winners: Jerry, Paco, Salvador; Elimination Challenge: Héctor, Matías and Norkys were asked to prepare a dessert using fruits. Before the judges announced the eliminated celebrity, Elvis decided to withdraw from the competition in lieu of an elimination.: Withdrew: Elvis
171	16	"Regreso polémico y doble inmunidad"	August 8, 2025
Celinee returned to the competition after missing several episodes. Carmen informs Celinee that due to her extended medical leave, she will have to directly face the next two elimination challenges, without being able to win immunity or safety. However, she could still participate in team challenges to help out her fellow competitors. Quickfire Challenge: The celebrities, working in pairs, were given 60 minutes to prepare fried chicken accompanied by a side dish and a sauce. The top three pairs advanced to the Immunity Challenge.: Winners: Lorena and Curvy, Paco and Salvador, Celinee and Sergio S.; Immunity Challenge: The celebrities, working in pairs assigned via knife draw, were asked to prepare an appetizer and a main dish, combining sweet and savory flavors. The winners received a shared secret advantage, immunity from elimination, and were named captains for the next team challenge.: Winners: Paco and Salvador
172	17	"Una promesa de amor en el Caribe"	August 10, 2025
Duel of Captains: Team captains Paco and Salvador were asked to prepare two appetizers and a beverage. The winner would choose two members for his team.: Winner: Salvador; Team Challenge: The teams catered a wedding with more than fifty guests. They were given 60 minutes to prepare the appetizer, 30 for the main course and 30 for the dessert table. The winning team received immunity from elimination.: Maroon Team: Salvador (C), Angélica, Curvy, Héctor, Juan, Jerry, Valeria, Yany; Yellow Team: Paco (C), Celinee, Cristina, Lorena, Matías, Nicole, Norkys, Sergio S.; Winners: Salvador, Angélica, Curvy, Héctor, Jerry, Juan, Valeria, Yany
173	18	"Lágrimas en la quinta eliminación"	August 11, 2025
Safety Challenge: The celebrities had to keep up with guest judge Chef Claudia Sandoval in recreating her grilled swordfish dish. The two celebrities to best replicate the dish were safe from elimination.: Winners: Cristina, Matías; Elimination Challenge: The celebrities were given 45 minutes to prepare a dish using mushrooms as their main ingredient.: Winners: Lorena, Nicole; Eliminated: Sergio Sendel
174	19	"Reencuentros y reloj implacable"	August 12, 2025
Quickfire Challenge: The celebrities, working in trios, were given 60 minutes to individually prepare two servings of a dish. The team captain had to taste the three dishes prepared and choose which one to present to the judges. The winning team advanced to the Immunity Challenge.: Winners: Angélica, Juan, Matías; Before the Immunity Challenge began, Paco and Salvador's shared secret advantage was revealed: automatic qualification into the Immunity Challenge. Immunity Challenge: The celebrities had 60 minutes to prepare a dish with a protein. Salvador, having won a knife draw, had the advantage of assigning proteins to his competitors and how many minutes to take off their cooking time. The winner received immunity from elimination. The proteins assigned and minutes reduced by Salvador were: Angélica: Pork belly, -20; Juan: Pig's trotter, -45; Matías: Beef tongue, -30; Paco: Rabbit, -40; Salvador: Beef tenderloin, -5; Winner: Angélica
175	20	"Tradición italiana con desacuerdos"	August 13, 2025
Quickfire Challenge: The celebrities, working in pairs, were randomly assigned a cocktail that they had to transform into a dessert. The winners were safe from elimination.: Celinee, Juan: Espresso martini; Cristina, Paco: Piña colada; Curvy, Jerry: Mojito; Lorena, Nicole: Strawberry daiquiri; Matías, Norkys: Margarita; Salvador, Valeria: Negroni; Winners: Curvy and Jerry, Celinee and Juan; Safety Challenge: The celebrities were given 60 minutes to prepare pasta. The pasta types were assigned via knife draw, with Norkys and Paco being able to select the pasta of their choice. The top four celebrities were safe from elimination.: Dried pasta: Matías, Nicole; Fresh pasta: Lorena, Norkys, Salvador; Stuffed pasta: Cristina, Paco, Valeria; Winners: Salvador, Paco, Lorena, Cristina
176	21	"Diferencias irreconciliables"	August 14, 2025
Safety Challenge: The celebrities were given 45 minutes to cook any dish but the total weight of their ingredients had to be less than seven pounds. The pantry was open for three minutes. The winner was safe from elimination.: Winner: Norkys; Elimination Challenge: The celebrities had 60 minutes to prepare any dish.: Winner: Héctor; Eliminated: Valeria
177	22	"La sorpresa que nadie querría"	August 15, 2025
Immunity Challenge: The celebrities, working in pairs and a trio, were asked to prepare a surf and turf dish using only ingredients provided by the judges. The top three teams received immunity from elimination.: Winners: Cristina and Paco, Celinee and Curvy, Angélica and Norkys; Elimination Challenge: In a surprise Elimination Challenge, the celebrities had 60 minutes to prepare a tamale.: Eliminated: Jerry
178	23	"Batalla sobre ruedas"	August 17, 2025
Quickfire Challenge: The celebrities were asked to prepare a spring roll with a sauce. Once a celebrity completed the challenge they were allowed to pick their team for the team challenge. Restaurant Wars Challenge: The celebrities were split into two teams and each team was responsible for running a food truck. The teams had 75 minutes to prepare three dishes for fifty guests. Cristina had the advantage of choosing a food truck and her team's dishes first. The winning team was safe from elimination.: Maroon Team: Paco (C), Celinee, Curvy, Héctor, Lorena, Nicole (Tempura, Ramen, Bibimbap); Yellow Team: Cristina (C), Angélica, Juan, Matías, Norkys, Salvador (Sushi, Pad Thai, Dim Sum); Winners: Cristina, Angélica, Juan, Matías, Norkys, Salvador
179	24	"Noche de octava eliminación"	August 18, 2025
Safety Challenge: The celebrities were asked to prepare a monochromatic dish. Top Chef VIP 3 runner-up El Niño Prodigio served as guest judge for this challenge. The top two celebrities were safe from elimination.: Winners: Lorena, Nicole; Elimination Challenge: Celinee, Curvy and Héctor had 45 minutes to prepare a vegetarian dish.: Winner: Celinee; Eliminated: Héctor
180	25	"Niños al poder y nueva inmunidad"	August 19, 2025
Carmen informs the celebrities that Yany withdrew from the competition for personal reasons. Quickfire Challenge: The celebrities, working in teams, were asked to prepare a dish with an ingredient that children hate. The top two teams qualified for the Immunity Challenge.: Beige Team: Juan, Lorena, Salvador (Beet); Blue Team: Norkys and Paco (Blood sausage); Green Team: Celinee, Cristina, Matías (Liver); Red Team: Angélica, Curvy, Nicole (Spinach); Winners: Celinee, Cristina and Matías; Norkys and Paco; Immunity Challenge: The celebrities were given 60 minutes to prepare a dish using an exotic protein. The winner received immunity from elimination.: Celinee: escamol; Cristina: quail; Matías: pirarucu; Norkys: beef brain; Paco: guinea pig; Winner: Cristina
181	26	"Infracciones y mentiras"	August 20, 2025
Quickfire Challenge: The celebrities were given 45 minutes to prepare four tacos with a sauce. Top Chef VIP 3 contestant Pancho Uresti was the guest judge. The top two celebrities were safe from elimination.: Winners: Curvy, Lorena; Safety Challenge: The celebrities, working in pairs, were randomly assigned a variety of rice and had 60 minutes to prepare three servings of their dish. The winning pair was safe from elimination.: Blue Team: Juan and Paco (Wild rice); Green Team: Angélica and Salvador (Basmati); Pink Team: Celinee and Norkys (White rice); Purple Team: Matías and Nicole (Arborio); Winners: Juan and Paco
182	27	"Seis robos y una eliminación"	August 21, 2025
Safety Challenge: Each celebrity at risk of elimination was given a basket with 15 ingredients. One at a time, the celebrities had to take 10 ingredients from one or more baskets. Afterwards, they had to cook with the ingredients that they stole and the top three celebrities were safe from elimination.: Winners: Angélica, Salvador, Matías; Elimination Challenge: Celinee, Nicole and Norkys had 60 minutes to prepare a dish using fish as their protein.: Eliminated: Norkys
183	28	"Un muro entre los dos"	August 22, 2025
Quickfire Challenge: The celebrities had to cook a dish while simultaneously giving instructions to their partner, hidden behind a wall, on how to prepare the same dish. The dishes had to resemble each others other in taste and presentation. The top three pairs qualified for the Immunity Challenge.: Winners: Lorena and Matías, Juan and Salvador, Angélica and Celinee; Immunity Challenge: The celebrities were given 45 minutes to prepare two arepas. Top Chef VIP 3 contestant Gabriel Coronel was the guest judge. The winner received a secret advantage and immunity from elimination.: Winner: Angélica
184	29	"Capitana por descarte y sabotaje"	August 24, 2025
Express Challenge: The celebrities had to choose a contestant they wanted to face in a duel in which they had to prepare a classic French dish. Celinee did not have an opponent and was named captain of the yellow team. The winner of each duel could choose their team first.: Lorena vs. Salvador: croque madame; Curvy vs. Juan: omelette; Cristina vs. Nicole: poached egg; Matías vs. Paco: pain perdeu; Before the Team Challenge began, Angélica's secret advantage was revealed: she could save all the celebrities from the next elimination, but her team had to lose the team challenge. Only Carmen and Angélica knew about the secret advantage. Team Challenge: The teams had 90 minutes to prepare six different types of crepes for fifty guests. Angélica successfully sabotaged her team and lost the challenge, ensuring that everyone was safe from the next elimination.: Maroon Team: Angélica (C), Cristina, Juan, Paco, Salvador; Yellow Team: Celinee (C), Curvy, Lorena, Matías, Nicole; Winners: Celinee, Curvy, Lorena, Matías, Nicole
185	30	"¿Lágrimas simuladas o reales?"	August 25, 2025
Quickfire Challenge: The celebrities, working in pairs assigned by Angélica, used a slot machine to determine the guidelines for their dish. The machine assigned a protein, sauce, side dish, and number of servings to prepare. The top three pairs advanced to the Immunity Challenge.: Winners: Lorena and Matías, Juan and Salvador, Nicole and Paco; Immunity Challenge: The celebrities were given 60 minutes to cook duck breast. When indicated by Carmen, the celebrities had to incorporate a new ingredient to their dish. The winner received immunity from elimination. The ingredients incorporated were: Juan: habanero peppers, rice paper, agave syrup; Lorena: katsuobushi, ullucus, anise; Matías: oyster mushrooms, sun-dried tomatoes, polenta; Nicole: sumac, lard, strawberries; Paco: mango, powdered sugar, garlic powder; Salvador: gochujang, allspice, lulo; Winner: Paco
186	31	"Inmunes y rivales"	August 26, 2025
Quickfire Challenge: The celebrities were given 60 minutes to make ice cream from scratch with unconventional flavors. Top Chef VIP 3 contestant Alicia Machado was the guest judge. Juan, Lorena, Cristina, Matías and Curvy are chosen as the top five, and Curvy wins immunity from elimination, while the rest of them compete in the Safety Challenge.: Celinee: roasted jalapeño; Cristina: caviar; Curvy: olive oil; Juan: beer; Lorena: hibiscus with mezcal; Matías: avocado; Nicole: morita pepper; Salvador: grilled corn; Winner: Curvy; Safety Challenge: Cristina, Juan, Lorena and Matías had 75 minutes to prepare a pizza. The top two celebrities were safe from elimination.: Winners: Juan, Lorena
187	32	"Familia disfuncional"	August 27, 2025
Safety Challenge: Celinee, Cristina, Matías, Nicole and Salvador were given 60 minutes to prepare a Caribbean dish using only ingredients provided by the judges. Top Chef VIP 1 contestant Chiky Bom Bom was the guest judge. The top two celebrities were safe from elimination.: Winners: Cristina, Salvador; Elimination Challenge: Celinee, Matías and Nicole were asked to prepare a dish using eggplant as their main ingredient.: Winner: Celinee; Eliminated: Nicole
188	33	"Citas románticas y granos milenarios"	August 28, 2025
Quickfire Challenge: The celebrities were asked to prepare a dish inspired by a romantic date. The top four celebrities qualified for the Immunity Challenge.: Winners: Paco, Celinee, Juan, Lorena; Immunity Challenge: Celinee, Juan, Lorena and Paco had 60 minutes to prepare a dish using ancient grains. The winner received immunity from elimination.: Winner: Paco
189	34	"Invitados VIP y lucha por inmunidad"	August 29, 2025
Quickfire Challenge: The celebrities were split into two teams and were responsible for running a restaurant, serving 45 guests that would vote for the winner. Top Chef VIP 3 contestant El Puma was a special guest and his vote counted for five. The menus had to include a cold and a hot appetizer, a main dish with meat protein and another with pasta, and one dessert. Chef Toño and Chef Betty were the team captains. Chef Tita was the captain of the dining room, serving as a liaison between the dining room and the kitchen. The Maroon Team won by a vote of 27–23 and competed in the Immunity Challenge.: Maroon Team: Chef Betty (C), Angélica, Juan, Lorena, Salvador; Yellow Team: Chef Toño (C), Celinee, Cristina, Curvy, Matías; Winners: Angélica, Juan, Lorena, Salvador; Immunity Challenge: Angélica, Juan, Lorena, Salvador had 45 minutes to prepare two dishes using only the ingredients found in the fridges of Carmen and Top Chef VIP 3 contestants Danka Castro, David Salomón and Jason Romo. A knife draw decided the order in which the celebrities picked a refrigerator. The winner received to the Immunity Challenge.: Winner: Salvador
190	35	"Joropo y cocina llanera"	August 31, 2025
Express Challenge: The celebrities were given 45 minutes to prepare llanero rice bread and the ranking of the dishes determined the order in which they picked their teams. Team Challenge: The teams had 90 minutes to prepare a llanero meal consisting of llanero-style meat, two cold side dishes, two hot side dishes, three sauces and rice bread. Each team served 45 guests. The winning team received immunity from elimination.: Maroon Team: Salvador (C), Angélica, Curvy, Matías; Yellow Team: Paco (C), Celinee, Cristina, Juan; Winners: Salvador, Angélica, Curvy, Matías
191	36	"Rivales en la cava y lucha en cocina"	September 1, 2025
Safety Challenge: Celinee, Cristina, Juan and Lorena were asked to prepare a pork dish. A knife draw determined which cut they would cook with. The winner was safe from elimination.: Celinee: ham; Cristina: loin; Juan: jowl; Lorena: ribs; Winner: Cristina; Elimination Challenge: Celinee, Juan and Lorena were given 60 minutes to prepare any dish.: Eliminated: Celinee
192	37	"Partido por la inmunidad"	September 2, 2025
Quickfire Challenge: The celebrities, working in pairs, competed in the Black Box challenge. After entering the black box, which covered the celebrities in total darkness, each team had three minutes to taste, smell and feel a mystery dish. The teams then had 60 minutes to recreate the dish. The two teams with the most similar dishes advanced to the Immunity Challenge.: Blue Team: Juan, Salvador; Maroon Team: Angélica, Matías; Green Team: Curvy, Lorena; Yellow Team: Cristina, Paco; Winners: Juan and Salvador, Curvy and Lorena; Immunity Challenge: Inspired by the opening game of the 2025 NFL season between the Philadelphia Eagles and the Dallas Cowboys, the celebrities had 45 minutes to prepare dishes representative of the two teams' host cities. Fajitas represented Dallas and Philly cheesesteak represented Philadelphia. The dishes were assigned via knife draw and the winner received immunity from elimination.: Fajitas: Curvy, Salvador; Philly cheesesteak: Juan, Lorena; Winner: Juan
193	38	"Promesas incumplidas y un veredicto"	September 3, 2025
Quickfire Challenge: The celebrities were given 75 minutes to replicate pastry chef Jesús Escalera's dessert. The winner was safe from elimination.: Winner: Cristina; Safety Challenge: The celebrities, working in trios, had to prepare three servings of a meat tartare, a seafood tartare and a vegetarian tartare. The winning trio was safe from elimination.: Maroon Team: Lorena, Matías, Paco; Yellow Team: Angélica, Curvy, Salvador; Winners: Lorena, Matías, Paco, Angélica, Curvy, Salvador
194	39	"Una preparación impecable"	September 4, 2025
Quickfire Challenge: The celebrities had 60 minutes to prepare a dish that showcased the techniques they have learned throughout the competition. The top four celebrities advanced to the Immunity Challenge.: Winners: Cristina, Curvy, Lorena, Paco; Immunity Challenge: Cristina, Curvy, Lorena and Paco completed a mise en place of three stages: shell peas, debone chicken leg and thigh, and julienne six onions. Once the tasks were finished, they were able to start preparing their dishes using the ingredients from the mise en place. The winner received immunity from elimination.: Winner: Paco
195	40	"La última ventaja en juego"	September 5, 2025
Quickfire Challenge: The celebrities were given 60 minutes to cook any dish and the judges tasted them without knowing who cooked them. The top four celebrities competed in the secret advantage challenge.: Winners: Curvy, Matías, Lorena, Juan; Secret Advantage Challenge: Curvy, Juan, Lorena and Matías were given 60 minutes to prepare a dish using chili peppers as their main ingredient. Chef Lupita Vidal served as guest judge. The winner received the last secret advantage of the season.: Winner: Matías
196	41	"El fútbol como protagonista"	September 7, 2025
The celebrities had 30 minutes to prepare an appetizer. The ranking of the dishes determined the order in which they picked their partner for the Safety Challenge..: Angélica: jalapeño poppers; Cristina: yuca/cassava chips; Curvy: curly fries; Lorena: mozzarella sticks; Matías: onion rings; Salvador: esquite; Safety Challenge: Inspired by the 2026 FIFA World Cup, the celebrities competed in a mini-tournament for safety from elimination. The four pairs were divided into two matches and the winner of each match competed in a final showdown. In each round they were to prepare seven servings of their dish, for the three judges and four guests: former soccer players Carlos Bocanegra, Anisa Guajardo and Maza Rodríguez, and Exatlón Estados Unidos host Frederik Oldenburg.: Round 1: The pairs were given 60 minutes to prepare classic stadium food. Paco and Salvador defeated Curvy and Lorena in a 6–1 vote, while Angélica and Juan defeated Cristina and Matías, also in a 6–1 vote.; Barbecue wings: Curvy, Lorena; Burrito: Angélica, Juan; Chicken sandwich: Paco, Salvador; Hamburger: Cristina, Matías; Winners: Paco and Salvador, Angélica and Juan; Round 2: The remaining pairs had 30 minutes to prepare finger foods. Paco and Salvador won by a vote of 6–1 and were safe from elimination.; Winners: Paco and Salvador
197	42	"Eliminación sin precedentes"	September 8, 2025
Safety Challenge: The celebrities were given 60 minutes to prepare a savory dish using cheese as their main ingredient. The winner was safe from elimination.: Winner: Cristina; Elimination Challenge: Angélica, Curvy, Lorena and Matías were asked to prepare their comfort food. Matías is eliminated, but reveals his secret advantage: cancel one of the next two eliminations. He decides to cancel the elimination to remain in the competition.
198	43	"Sabores de México, enfado y huelga"	September 9, 2025
Quickfire Challenge: The celebrities were asked to prepare a Mexican snack served on a spoon shaped plate. Chef Claudette Zepeda was the guest judge. The top four celebrities advanced to the Immunity Challenge.: Winners: Angélica, Curvy, Lorena, Paco; Immunity Challenge: Angélica, Curvy, Lorena and Paco were given 60 minutes to prepare chile en nogada. The winner received immunity from elimination.: Winner: Angélica
199	44	"A las puertas de una eliminación"	September 10, 2025
Quickfire Challenge: The celebrities were given 60 minutes to prepare a dish using garlic as their main ingredient. The winner was safe from elimination.: Winner: Cristina; Safety Challenge: The celebrities were asked to prepare a dish using only ingredients chosen by the judges. The winner was safe from elimination.: Winner: Matías
200	45	"Desconcierto y lágrimas"	September 11, 2025
Safety Challenge: The celebrities were given 60 minutes to cook any dish but could only use the utensils provided by the judges.: Winner: Salvador; Elimination Challenge: Curvy, Juan, Lorena and Paco had 45 minutes to prepare a seafood dish.: Eliminated: Paco
201	46	"Remanso de paz"	September 12, 2025
Quickfire Challenge: The celebrities, working in teams, had 60 minutes to prepare a three-course meal, presenting three servings of each dish. Each team received help from a contestant from previous seasons. The aquamarine team was assisted by season 3 contestant Gary Centeno, the pink team was assisted by season 2 contestant Sebastián Villalobos, and the purple team was assisted by season 1 contestant Héctor Suárez Gomís. The judges decide that all teams performed well and that everyone would compete in the Immunity Challenge.: Aquamarine Team: Cristina, Matías; Pink Team: Angélica, Curvy, Salvador; Purple Team: Juan, Lorena; Immunity Challenge: The celebrities were given 30 minutes to prepare an appetizer using frog legs. The winner received immunity from elimination.: Winner: Salvador
202	47	"El pasado regresa, parte 1"	September 14, 2025
Celinee, Christopher, Jerry, Nicole, Norkys, Paco, Valeria and Yany Quickfire Challenge #1: The eliminated celebrities were asked to prepare a dish inspired by Colombia. Chef Álvaro Clavijo was the guest judge. The winner, chosen by the judges, returned to the competition.: Winner: Yany; Quickfire Challenge #2: The eliminated contestants had 60 minutes to prepare a meal for the eight celebrities still in the competition, who would then vote for the contestant they wanted to return to the competition. Valeria wins with 5 votes, followed by Celinee in second place with 2 votes.: Winner: Valeria
203	48	"El pasado regresa, parte 2"	September 15, 2025
Celinee, Christopher, Jerry, Nicole, Norkys and Paco continued to compete for a chance to re-enter the competition. Quickfire Challenge #1: The eliminated celebrities had 60 minutes to prepare a dish from a Central American country. The top two celebrities advanced to a second Quickfire Challenge.: Costa Rica: Christopher (Casado), Paco (Beef and potato picadillo); El Salvador: Jerry (Pupusa); Guatemala: Nicole (Kak'ik); Nicaragua: Norkys (Tres leches dessert); Panama: Celinee (Guacho); Winners: Paco, Norkys; Quickfire Challenge #2: Paco and Norkys were given 60 minutes to prepare any dish. The winner returned to the competition.: Winner: Paco
204	49	"El maíz y el camino a la inmunidad"	September 16, 2025
Quickfire Challenge: The celebrities were asked to prepare four servings of a dish that used corn or huitlacoche as their main ingredient. Chef Celia Florian served as guest judge. The top five celebrities advanced to the Immunity Challenge.: Winners: Angélica, Cristina, Paco, Lorena, Yany; Immunity Challenge: The celebrities were given 60 minutes to prepare any dish, but they could only shop in the pantry once in order to reduce waste as much as possible. The winner received immunity from elimination.: Winner: Yany
205	50	"Catering y platos con insectos"	September 17, 2025
Quickfire Challenge: The celebrities, working in teams, were asked to prepare a buffet that included 5 dishes. The winners competed in the Immunity Challenge.: Maroon Team: Yany (C), Cristina, Matías, Paco, Valeria; Yellow Team: Salvador (C), Angélica, Curvy, Juan, Lorena; Winners: Salvador, Angélica, Curvy, Juan, Lorena; Immunity Challenge: Angélica, Curvy, Juan and Lorena were given 60 minutes to prepare a dish using three different insects. The top two celebrities were safe from elimination.: Winners: Angélica, Lorena
206	51	"Clásicos internacionales y un adiós"	September 18, 2025
Safety Challenge: The celebrities were challenged with preparing a vegetarian version of a classic dish. The top three celebrities were safe from elimination.: Cristina: Chicken tikka masala; Curvy: Beef bourguignon; Juan: Shepherd's pie; Paco: Cochinita pibil; Matías: Goulash; Valeria: Spaghetti and meatballs; Winners: Juan, Paco, Cristina; Elimination Challenge: Curvy, Matías and Valeria were given 60 minutes to prepare fish and chips.: Winner: Valeria; Eliminated: Curvy
207	52	"Papas y huevos para la inmunidad"	September 19, 2025
Quickfire Challenge: The celebrities were given 60 minutes to prepare a dish using potatoes as their main ingredient. Chef Oscar González was the guest judge. The top five celebrities advanced to the Immunity Challenge.: Winners: Paco, Cristina, Yany, Angélica, Juan; Immunity Challenge: Angélica, Cristina, Juan, Paco and Yany had 30 minutes to prepare eggs benedict. The winner received immunity from elimination.: Winner: Cristina
208	53	"Teléfono descompuesto y mini postres"	September 21, 2025
Quickfire Challenge: In a game of telephone, the teams had to replicate an appetizer, main course, and dessert created by the judges using only their verbal and written descriptions as guidance. Each team member took a 15-minute turn in the kitchen and had two minutes to explain the recipes to the next member. The winning team advanced to the Safety Challenge.: Maroon Team: Matías (C), Angélica, Lorena, Salvador; Yellow Team: Paco (C), Juan, Valeria, Yany; Winners: Matías, Angélica, Lorena, Salvador; Safety Challenge: Inspired by the film Gabby's Dollhouse: The Movie, Angélica, Lorena, Matías and Salvador were given 60 minutes to prepare a miniature dessert. The top two celebrities were safe from elimination.: Angélica: churros; Lorena: cinnamon roll; Matías: donut; Salvador: milhojas; Winners: Angélica, Matías
209	54	"Del abismo al cielo en un mismo día"	September 22, 2025
Safety Challenge: The celebrities were given 75 minutes to prepare a sandwich, with the bread being made from scratch. The top two celebrities were safe from elimination.: Winners: Paco, Salvador; Elimination Challenge: Juan, Lorena, Valeria and Yany had 60 minutes to cook pork belly.: Winner: Yany; Eliminated: Valeria
210	55	"Las reglas son para cumplirlas"	September 23, 2025
Quickfire Challenge: The celebrities had 60 minutes to replicate Paty Navidad's winning dish from season three. The three celebrities to best replicate the dish competed in the Immunity Challenge.: Winners: Salvador, Paco, Angélica; Immunity Challenge: Angélica, Paco, and Salvador were given 60 minutes to prepare any dish, but they had to use the ingredients that the judges selected from the pantry. The winner received immunity from elimination.: Winner: Paco
211	56	"Dos retos para una inmunidad"	September 24, 2025
Quickfire Challenge: The celebrities were asked to prepare a dish using ingredients they could see in a transparent box or to choose ingredients blindly from a black box. Cristina, Matías and Yany chose the transparent box and had 40 minutes to cook their dish, while Angélica, Lorena and Salvador chose the black box and had 60 minutes to cook. The top three celebrities advanced to the Immunity Challenge.: Winners: Cristina, Yany, Lorena; Immunity Challenge: Cristina, Yany, Lorena had 60 minutes to prepare a dish that that incorporated three textures.: Winner: Cristina
212	57	"Regreso sorpresivo"	September 25, 2025
Quickfire Challenge: The celebrities were given 60 minutes to prepare two servings of a soup. The soups were assigned via a roulette wheel. Top Chef VIP 3 contestant Diana Reyes and eliminated contestants Héctor and Karina served as guest judges. The six judges rated the soups on a scale of one to five points. The three celebrities with the highest scores competed in the Safety Challenge.: Angélica: Sancocho; Lorena: Minestrone; Matías: Mondongo; Salvador: Ramen; Yany: Pozole; Winners: Lorena, Salvador, Matías; Safety Challenge: Lorena, Matías and Salvador had 45 minutes to prepare risotto. A knife draw determined the order in which they would choose the type of risotto to cook.: Lorena: Mushroom risotto; Matías: Black risotto; Salvador: Seafood risotto; Winner: Salvador
213	58	"Un giro asombroso"	September 26, 2025
Juan announces that he is withdrawing from the competition for medical reasons. Because of this, the judges cancel the elimination and announce that qualification for the Semifinal would begin. Due to having won immunity from elimination, Cristina, Paco and Salvador automatically advanced to the first Semifinal Qualification Challenge. Quickfire Challenge #1: Angélica, Lorena, Matías and Yany were given 70 minutes to prepare a swiss roll. The winner was able to compete for a spot in the Semifinal.: Winner: Yany; Quickfire Challenge #2: Angélica, Lorena and Matías had to recognize herbs by smell or appearance. Only if they guessed correctly could they choose which one to cook with. If they failed, they had to cook with the herb they had not recognized. Afterwards, they had 45 minutes to prepare their dish. The winner was able to compete for a spot in the Semifinal.: Winner: Lorena
214	59	"El primer cupo en la semifinal"	September 28, 2025
Quickfire Challenge: The celebrities had 60 minutes to prepare a dish inspired by an emoji. The top three celebrities competed in the Semifinal Qualifying Challenge. The emojis picked were: Cristina: woman dancing; Lorena: shrimp; Paco: broken heart; Salvador: hot pepper; Yany: chef; Winners: Yany, Lorena, Cristina; Semifinal Qualifying Challenge: Cristina, Lorena, Yany were given 60 minutes to cook a dish using tubers and bulbs. The winner advanced to the Semifinal.: Winner: Lorena
215	60	"Cacao, cítricos y muchos nervios"	September 29, 2025
Quickfire Challenge: The celebrities were given 60 minutes to prepare a dish using cacao as their main ingredient. The top three celebrities advanced to the Semifinal Qualifying Challenge.: Winners: Cristina, Yany, Salvador; Semifinal Qualifying Challenge: Cristina, Salvador and Yany had 60 minutes to cook a dish using citrus fruits as their main ingredient. The winner qualified for the Semifinal.: Winner: Cristina
216	61	"Sabor peruano rumbo a la semifinal"	September 30, 2025
Quickfire Challenge: The celebrities were given 60 minutes to cook a dish using Peruvian ingredients. Chef Palmiro Ocampo was the guest judge. The top three celebrities advanced to the Semifinal Qualifying Challenge.: Winners: Paco, Yany, Angélica; Semifinal Qualifying Challenge: Inspired by the reality series La isla: desafío extremo, Angélica, Paco, Yany had to pick 15 ingredients from three chests. Afterwards, they had 60 minutes to prepare their dish. The winner advanced to the Semifinal.: Winner: Angélica
217	62	"Fusión latina por el cuarto pase"	October 1, 2025
Quickfire Challenge: Matías, Paco, Salvador and Yany were asked to prepare a fusion dish that combined a classic Latin dish with the flavor profile of a New York City neighborhood. The top three celebrities advanced to the Semifinal Qualifying Challenge. The dishes and neighborhoods assigned were: Matías: Arepa and Astoria; Paco: Chile en nogada and Curry Hill; Salvador: Bandeja paisa and Koreatown; Yany: Tamale and Little Odessa; Winners: Paco, Yany, Salvador; Semifinal Qualifying Challenge: Paco, Salvador and Yany had 60 minutes to cook ribs. The winner qualified for the Semifinal.: Paco: fish ribs; Salvador: tomahawk pork chop; Yany: tomahawk steak; Winner: Paco
218	63	"Seis semifinalistas, un triste adiós"	October 2, 2025
Quickfire Challenge: Matías, Salvador, and Yany had 60 minutes to prepare any dish, but they had to plate it in three different ways. The winners competed in the first Semifinal Qualifying Challenge.: Winners: Matías, Yany; Semifinal Qualifying Challenge #1: Matías and Yany were given 45 minutes to prepare an improved version of a dish they had previously presented that they felt had more potential. The winner advanced to the semifinal.: Winner: Matías; Semifinal Qualifying Challenge #2: Salvador and Yany had 60 minutes to cook any dish. The winner became the sixth semifinalist.: Winner: Salvador; Eliminated: Yany
219	64	"Primer finalista desde Barranquilla"	October 3, 2025
Semifinal: The top 6 celebrities were given 60 minutes to prepare any dish. Each celebrity had to present two servings of the same dish, one for the judges and another for guest food critics, who happened to be their friends and family. The cooking order was based on who qualified for the semifinal first. The winner advanced to the Finale.: Winner: Salvador
220	65	"Tres finalistas y dos despedidas"	October 5, 2025
Angélica, Cristina, Lorena, Paco and Matías were given 75 minutes to prepare six servings of a dish that used ingredients from Colombian cuisine. World-renowned chefs Jaime Rodríguez, Marsia Taha, and Bittor Sierra served as guest judges. A knife draw determined the cooking order. The top three celebrities advanced to the Finale.: Winners: Paco, Lorena, Cristina; Eliminated: Angélica, Matías
221	66	"Tres platos hacia la victoria"	October 6, 2025
Finale: Cristina, Lorena, Paco and Salvador were asked to prepare a three-course meal. They had 60 minutes to prepare an appetizer, 90 minutes for the main course, and 90 minutes for a dessert.: Winner: Cristina; Runners-up: Lorena, Paco, Salvador
