= Top Chef VIP =

American television series

- Genre: Reality competition; Cooking show
- Based on: Top Chef
- Presented by: Carmen Villalobos
- Judges: Antonio de Livier; Adria Marina Montaño; Juan Manuel Barrientos; Belén Alonso; Inés Páez Nin; Betty Vázquez
- Country of origin: United States
- Original language: Spanish
- No. of seasons: 5
- No. of episodes: 281 (list of episodes)

Production
- Executive producers: Francisco Suarez; Luciano Cardinali; Fernando Lorente
- Running time: 82-128 minutes
- Production company: RCN Televisión

Original release
- Network: Telemundo
- Release: August 9, 2022 – present

Top Chef VIP is an American reality competition television series that premiered on Telemundo on August 9, 2022. The show is produced by RCN Televisión for Telemundo. It is the second Spanish-language adaptation of the Top Chef format in the United States after Top Chef Estrellas, which was also broadcast on Telemundo between 2014 and 2015.

In October 2025, the series was renewed for a fifth season that premiered on August 11, 2026.

== Format ==
A group of celebrities put their cooking skills to the test and are judged by a panel of professional chefs with two contestants eliminated each week. The winner receives the grand cash prize.

In the Quickfire Challenge, celebrities compete individually or in teams and must cook a dish that meets certain guidelines. They are usually given an hour or less to complete the challenge. The judges select one or more celebrities as the winners of the challenge. Early in the season, the winning celebrities qualify for the episode's immunity challenge. As the number of contestants dwindles, immunity is withdrawn, and instead, the winner advances to the Semifinal Qualification Challenge for a place in the semifinal of the season.

In the Immunity Challenge, celebrities compete individually and prepare cook a dish using specific ingredients. The winning celebrity receives immunity from that week's elimination.

In the Express Challenge, celebrities are given 20 minutes or less to prepare a quick dish (for example, a sandwich, quesadilla, omelet) or sauce. This challenge is used to assign teams for the Team Challenge.

In the Skills Challenge, celebrities perform a list of common cooking techniques or styles (for example, peeling/chopping vegetables, whip/whisk eggs). Like the Express Challenge, this challenge is done to assign team members for the team challenge.

In the Team Challenge, celebrities are split into teams by a knife draw, team captains, or an express/skills challenge. The challenge usually consists of preparing a meal for a large group of guests or a "Restaurant Wars" challenge, where the celebrities must transform an empty space into a functioning pop-up restaurant. The winning team is safe from elimination, while the losing team participates in the Safety Challenge to avoid elimination.

In the Safety Challenge, the celebrities, competing individually or in pairs, have one last chance to save themselves from elimination.

In the Elimination Challenge, the celebrities must cook a dish using a certain ingredient. On some occasions, they can cook any dish of their choice.

== Seasons ==
Season	Winner	Runners-up			Original air dates
1	Lambda García	Cristina Eustace	Mauricio Islas	Zuleyka Rivera	August 9 – September 26, 2022
2	Alana Lliteras	Germán Montero	Laura Zapata	Sebastián Villalobos	April 25 – July 17, 2023
3	Patricia Navidad	David Salomón	José María Galeano	Víctor Florencio "Niño Prodigio"	May 21 – July 29, 2024
4	Cristina Porta	Lorena Herrera	Paco Pizaña	Salvador Zerboni	July 22 – October 6, 2025
5	Guty Carrera	Kelly Ríos	Lupillo Rivera	Ninel Conde	August 11 – October 19, 2026

== Production ==
=== Development ===
On May 12, 2022, it was announced that Telemundo had ordered Top Chef VIP. On September 24, 2022, host Carmen Villalobos announced that the series was renewed for a second season. The second season premiered on April 25, 2023. On July 18, 2023, Telemundo renewed the series for a third season. The third season premiered on May 21, 2024. On May 8, 2025, Telemundo renewed the series for a fourth season. The fourth season premiered on July 22, 2025. On October 6, 2025, Telemundo renewed the series for a fifth season. The fifth season is premiered on August 11, 2026.

=== Casting ===
On July 20, 2022, Carmen Villalobos was announced as host of the show. That same day, Antonio de Livier, Adria Marina Montaño and Juan Manuel Barrientos were announced as judges. On April 15, 2024, it was announced that Montaño and Barrientos would not be returning for the third season. They were replaced by Belén Alonso and Inés Páez Nin. On July 15, 2025, it was announced that Alonso would not return for the fourth season and was replaced by Betty Vázquez.

== Reception ==
=== Ratings ===
Viewership and ratings per season of Top Chef VIP
Season	Timeslot (ET)	Episodes	First aired		Last aired		Avg. viewers (millions)
Season	Timeslot (ET)	Episodes	Date	Viewers (millions)	Date	Viewers (millions)	Avg. viewers (millions)
1	Mon–Fri 7:00 p.m.	35	August 9, 2022	1.11	September 26, 2022	1.26	1.02
2	Mon–Fri 7:00 p.m.	60	April 25, 2023	0.97	July 17, 2023	1.09	0.87
3	Sun–Fri 7:00 p.m.	60	May 21, 2024	0.91	July 29, 2024	1.30	0.86
4	Sun–Fri 7:00 p.m.	66	July 22, 2025	0.92	October 6, 2025	1.80	1.20
5	Sun–Fri 7:00 p.m.	60	August 11, 2026	N/A	October 19, 2026	1.30	N/A

=== Awards and nominations ===
Year	Award	Category	Nominated	Result	Ref
2023	Produ Awards	Best Adapted Cooking Competition Series	Top Chef VIP	Nominated	
2025	Rose d'Or Latinos Awards	Best Reality Competition	Top Chef VIP	Nominated	
