= Top Chef VIP season 5 =

Top Chef VIP
- Season 5
- Hosted by: Carmen Villalobos
- Judges: Antonio de Livier; Inés Páez Nin; Betty Vázquez
- No. of contestants: 20
- Winner: Guty Carrera
- No. of episodes: 60

Release
- Original network: Telemundo
- Original release: August 11 – October 19, 2026

Season chronology
- ← Previous; Season 4

The fifth season of the American competitive reality television series Top Chef VIP premiered on Telemundo on August 11, 2026. The season was announced on October 6, 2025. Carmen Villalobos returned as host. Antonio de Livier, Inés Páez Nin and Betty Vázquez returned as judges.

This season introduced new rules to the competition. If a contestant obtains 8 immunities throughout the season, they will automatically become a semifinalist; if they obtain 12 immunities, they will automatically become a finalist. The contestants are also given the opportunity to earn Silver Spoons, which they can exchange for advantages in the competition.

The season was won by Guty Carrera, who received US$200,000.

== Contestants ==
Twenty celebrities were selected to compete in Top Chef VIP.

Name	Age	Hometown	Notability
Athenea Pérez	30	Murcia, Spain	Miss Universe Spain 2023
Aylín Mújica	51	Havana, Cuba	Actress
Carlos "Caramelo" Cruz	36	New York City, New York	Influencer
Carlos Ferro	42	Torreón, Mexico	Actor
Carlos Ponce	53	Santurce, Puerto Rico	Actor & singer
Diana Haro	25	Guadalajara, Mexico	Actress
Gaby Borges	27	Miami, Florida	Actress
Guty Carrera	35	Guayaquil, Ecuador	TV personality
José Joel	50	Mexico	Actor & singer
Kelly Ríos	32	Dibulla, Colombia	Athlete & influencer
Lupillo Rivera	54	Long Beach, California	Singer
Mauricio Garza	34	Monterrey, Mexico	Actor
Miguel Arce	41	Lima, Peru	Actor
Nailea Norvind	56	Mexico City, Mexico	Actress
Nievelis González	27	San Juan, Puerto Rico	TV personality
Ninel Conde	49	Toluca, Mexico	Actress & singer
Pedro Figueira "La Divaza"	28	Maracay, Venezuela	Influencer
Roberto Romano	36	Toluca, Mexico	Actor
Sheynnis Palacios	26	Managua, Nicaragua	Miss Universe 2023
Stephanie Salas	56	Mexico City, Mexico	Singer & actress

== Contestant progress ==
Episode #		1	2		3		4		5	6		7		8		9		10		11	12		13		14		15		16		17	18		19		20		21		22		23	24		25		26	27		28		29	30		31		32		33		34		35	36		37		38		39		40		41		42		43		44		45		46		47	48		49		50		51		52		53		54		55		56		57			58	59	60
1	Guty	IN	IN	IN	IN	—	WIN	IN	WIN	IMM	IMM	WIN	IN	IN	WIN	IMM	IMM	IN	—	LOW	IN	IN	IMM	IMM	IMM	IMM	IMM	IMM	IN	—	IN	WIN	IMM	WIN	WIN	IMM	IMM	IMM	IMM	IN	—	WIN	IMM	IMM	WIN	IN	IN	WIN	IMM	WIN	IN	WIN	WIN	IN	WIN	IN	WIN	WIN	IMM	IMM	WIN	IN	WIN	IMM	IMM	IN	—	WIN	IN	IN	IN	IN	—	IMM	IMM	IMM	IMM	IN	—	WIN	IN	IN	IN	WIN	WIN	IMM	IMM	IMM	WIN	WIN	IMM	IMM	IMM	IMM	IN	—	IN	—	WIN	IMM	IN	—	IN	—	IN	WIN	IMM	IN	WIN	WINNER
2	Kelly	IN	IN	HIGH	WIN	HIGH	IN	—	WIN	IMM	IMM	IN	—	IN	IN	WIN	IMM	WIN	WIN	IMM	IMM	IMM	WIN	IN	IN	—	IN	IN	IN	—	IN	IN	WIN	WIN	IN	WIN	WIN	IMM	IMM	WIN	WIN	IMM	IMM	IMM	IN	—	HIGH	WIN	IMM	WIN	IN	WIN	WIN	WIN	IMM	IMM	IMM	IMM	IMM	IMM	WIN	IN	IN	IN	WIN	WIN	IN	IN	—	WIN	IMM	WIN	IN	IMM	IMM	IMM	IMM	WIN	WIN	IMM	IMM	IMM	IMM	WIN	IN	LOW	IN	IN	IN	—	WIN	WIN	IMM	IMM	IN	—	WIN	WIN	IMM	IMM	WIN	IN	WIN	WIN	IMM	IMM	IMM	IN	WIN	RUNNER-UP
2	Lupillo	IN	IN	HIGH	IN	—	WIN	WIN	IMM	IMM	IMM	WIN	WIN	IMM	IMM	IMM	IMM	WIN	IN	WIN	IMM	IMM	IN	—	WIN	WIN	IMM	IMM	WIN	IN	WIN	IMM	IMM	IN	—	IN	—	WIN	IMM	—	—	—	IN	IN	WIN	IN	IN	WIN	IMM	WIN	IN	WIN	IN	—	WIN	IN	IN	—	WIN	IMM	IN	—	IN	WIN	IMM	WIN	IN	IN	—	IN	WDR			IN	WIN	IMM	IMM	WIN	IN	IN	—	WIN	IMM	—	—	—	WIN	IMM	IN	—	IN	—	WIN	IMM	WIN	IN	IN	—	WIN	IMM	—	—	IN	—	WIN	IMM	IMM	WIN	IMM	RUNNER-UP
2	Ninel	HIGH	IN	IN	WIN	WIN	IMM	IMM	IMM	IMM	IMM	WIN	HIGH	IN	IN	WIN	IMM	WIN	HIGH	LOW	WIN	IMM	IN	—	WIN	IN	WIN	IMM	IN	—	WIN	IMM	IMM	WIN	IN	IN	—	WIN	IMM	WIN	IN	WIN	IMM	IMM	IN	—	HIGH	WIN	IMM	—	—	WIN	IN	—	IN	—	WIN	IN	WIN	IMM	IN	—	WIN	IMM	IMM	IN	—	WIN	IN	IN	IN	IN	—	IMM	IMM	IMM	IMM	IN	—	IN	—	WIN	IMM	—	—	—	WIN	IMM	IN	—	WIN	WIN	IMM	IMM	WIN	WIN	IMM	IMM	IMM	IMM	IN	—	WIN	WIN	IMM	IMM	IMM	WIN	IMM	RUNNER-UP
5	Mauricio	HIGH	IN	IN	WIN	HIGH	IN	—	LOW	WIN	IMM	IN	—	IN	IN	WIN	IMM	IN	—	LOW	IN	IN	WIN	IN	IN	—	WIN	IMM	WIN	IN	IN	WIN	IMM	WIN	IN	WIN	WIN	IMM	IMM	WIN	IN	LOW	WIN	IMM	WIN	WIN	IMM	IMM	IMM	IN	—	WIN	WIN	IN	IN	—	IN	—	IN	WIN	WIN	IN	HIGH	IN	IN	WIN	WIN	IMM	IMM	IMM	IMM	IN	—	IMM	IMM	IMM	IMM	IN	—	WIN	IN	IN	IN	IN	—	WIN	IMM	IMM	IN	—	WIN	IN	IN	IN	IN	—	WIN	IN	IN	WIN	WIN	WIN	IMM	IMM	IMM	IMM	IMM	IN	OUT	
5	Roberto	HIGH	IN	HIGH	WIN	IN	WIN	IN	WIN	IMM	IMM	WIN	IN	IN	IN	WIN	IMM	IN	—	LOW	WIN	IMM	HIGH	—	WIN	WIN	IMM	IMM	WIN	WIN	IMM	IMM	IMM	WIN	IN	WIN	WIN	IMM	IMM	IN	—	WIN	IMM	IMM	WIN	IN	IN	WIN	IMM	IN	—	WIN	WIN	IN	WIN	WIN	IMM	IMM	IMM	IMM	IN	—	HIGH	WIN	IMM	IN	—	WIN	WIN	IMM	IMM	WIN	IN	IMM	IMM	IMM	IMM	WIN	IN	WIN	WIN	IMM	IMM	WIN	IN	WIN	IMM	IMM	IN	—	IN	—	WIN	IMM	WIN	IN	WIN	WIN	IMM	IMM	IN	—	WIN	IN	IN	IN	WIN	IN	OUT	
7	Aylín	WIN	IMM	IMM	IMM	IMM	IMM	IMM	IMM	IMM	IMM	WIN	IN	IN	IN	IN	IN	IN	—	LOW	IN	IN	—	—	—	—	—	—	WIN	IN	IN	WIN	IMM	IN	—	IN	—	—	—	NOM	—	NOM	IN	LOW	WIN	IN	WIN	IMM	IMM	IN	—	WIN	IN	—	IN	—	WIN	WIN	IMM	IMM	WIN	IN	HIGH	WIN	IMM	IN	—	WIN	WIN	IMM	IMM	WIN	WIN	IMM	IMM	IMM	IMM	IMM	IMM	IMM	IMM	IMM	IMM	IN	—	LOW	IN	IN	WIN	IN	IN	—	WIN	IMM	IN	—	WIN	IN	IN	LOW	WIN	IN	IN	—	IN	IN	OUT			
8	Miguel	IN	IN	HIGH	WIN	IN	WIN	IN	LOW	IN	IN	IN	—	IN	IN	IN	IN	IN	—	LOW	IN	IN	IN	—	WIN	IN	WIN	IMM	IN	—	IN	IN	IN	IN	—	WIN	WIN	IMM	IMM	IN	—	LOW	IN	IN	IN	—	IN	IN	IN	WIN	WIN	IMM	IN	—	IN	—	IN	—	WIN	IMM	WIN	WIN	IMM	IMM	IMM	IN	—	IN	—	IN	IN	IN	—	IMM	IMM	IMM	IMM	WIN	IN	WIN	WIN	IMM	IMM	WIN	HIGH	LOW	IN	IN	WIN	IN	IN	—	IN	LOW	WIN	IN	IN	—	IN	OUT										
9	Nievelis	IN	IN	IN	IN	—	IN	—	LOW	IN	IN	WIN	IN	IN	IN	WIN	IMM	WIN	IN	LOW	IN	IN	WIN	IN	IN	—	IN	IN	IN	—	IN	IN	IN	IN	—	WIN	WIN	IMM	IMM	WIN	IN	LOW	WIN	IMM	WIN	IN	IN	IN	OUT																									IN	IN	WIN	WIN	IN	—	WIN	IN	WIN	IMM	IN	—	WIN	IMM	IMM	IN	—	WIN	IN	IN	OUT																
10	Nailea	HIGH	IN	NOM	NOM	—	—	—	NOM	WIN	IMM	IN	—	IN	IN	IN	IN	IN	—	LOW	WIN	IMM	HIGH	—	WIN	IN	WIN	IMM	IN	—	IN	WIN	IMM	IN	—	IN	—	IN	IN	IN	—	LOW	IN	LOW	IN	—	IN	IN	IN	WIN	IN	WIN	IN	—	IN	—	IN	—	IN	LOW	IN	—	HIGH	IN	LOW	IN	—	IN	—	IN	IN	WIN	IN	IMM	IMM	IMM	IMM	WIN	IN	WIN	IN	IN	IN	IN	—	LOW	IN	OUT																						
11	José	IN	IN	IN	IN	—	IN	—	WIN	IMM	IMM	WIN	IN	IN	WIN	IMM	IMM	IN	—	LOW	IN	IN	IN	—	IN	—	IN	LOW	WIN	IN	IN	IN	OUT																																									WIN	IMM	IMM	IMM	IN	—	IN	—	IN	OUT																											
12	Stephanie	IN	IN	WIN	WIN	IN	WIN	IN	LOW	WIN	IMM	WIN	HIGH	IN	WIN	IMM	IMM	IN	—	WIN	IMM	IMM	HIGH	—	WIN	IN	WIN	IMM	IN	—	IN	IN	IN	WIN	IN	IN	—	IN	IN	IN	—	WIN	IMM	IMM	IN	—	HIGH	WIN	IMM	WIN	IN	WIN	WIN	IN	IN	—	WIN	IN	IN	IN	—	—	IN	IN	OUT																																													
13	Carlos P.	IN	IN	IN	WIN	IN	IN	—	WIN	IMM	IMM	IN	—	WIN	IMM	IMM	IMM	IN	—	LOW	IN	IN	WIN	WIN	IMM	IMM	IMM	IMM	WIN	IN	WIN	IMM	IMM	IN	—	WIN	WIN	IMM	IMM	IN	—	WIN	IMM	IMM	IN	—	IN	IN	LOW	IN	—	WIN	IN	—	WIN	IN	IN	—	IN	OUT															IN	WIN	IN																																	
14	Diana	IN	IN	IN	IN	—	IN	—	LOW	IN	WIN	IN	—	IN	IN	IN	WIN	IN	—	LOW	IN	IN	IN	—	WIN	WIN	IMM	IMM	—	—	WIN	IMM	IMM	IN	—	IN	—	IN	LOW	WIN	IN	LOW	IN	OUT																														IN	IN	WIN	IN																																	
15	Gaby	IN	IN	IN	IN	—	IN	—	LOW	WIN	IMM	WIN	HIGH	IN	IN	WIN	IMM	WIN	IN	WIN	IMM	IMM	HIGH	—	WIN	WIN	IMM	IMM	IN	—	WIN	IMM	IMM	IN	—	IN	—	IN	OUT																																																																							
16	Athenea	IN	IN	IN	IN	—	IN	—	LOW	IN	IN	IN	—	IN	WIN	IMM	IMM	IN	—	LOW	WIN	IMM	IN	—	IN	—	IN	OUT																																														IN	IN	IN																																		
17	Sheynnis	HIGH	—	—	—	—	IN	—	WIN	IMM	IMM	IN	—	IN	IN	IN	IN	WIN	IN	WIN	IMM	IMM	—	—	—	—	WDR																																																																																			
18	Carlos F.	IN	WIN	WIN	IMM	IMM	IMM	IMM	IMM	IMM	IMM	IN	—	WIN	IMM	IMM	IMM	IN	—	WIN	IMM	WDR																																																																																								
19	Divaza	IN	IN	IN	IN	—	WIN	IN	WIN	IMM	IMM	IN	—	IN	IN	IN	OUT																																																									IN	IN	IN																																		
20	Caramelo	IN	IN	NOM	NOM	—	IN	—	LOW	IN	OUT																																																															IN	IN	IN																																		

(WINNER) The chef won the season and was crowned "Top Chef".
(RUNNER-UP) The chef was a runner-up for the season.
(WIN) The celebrity won the Quickfire Challenge, Immunity Challenge, Safety Challenge, or Elimination Challenge.
(WIN) The celebrity was on the winning team in the Team Challenge and directly advanced to the next round.
(HIGH) The celebrity was selected as one of the top entries in an individual or team challenge, but did not win.
(IN) The celebrity was not selected as one of the top or bottom entries in an individual challenge and was safe.
(IN) The celebrity was not selected as a top or bottom entry in a Team Challenge.
(IMM) The celebrity didn't have to compete in that round of the competition and was safe from elimination.
(IMM) The celebrity had to compete in that round of the competition but was safe from elimination.
(—) The celebrity did not quality for a challenge.
(—) The celebrity was unable to participate due to personal reasons.
(LOW) The celebrity was selected as one of the bottom entries in the Elimination Challenge, but was not eliminated.
(LOW) The celebrity was one of the bottom entries in a Team Challenge.
(NOM) The celebrity lost an individual or team challenge and was nominated for elimination.
(NOM) The celebrity was already nominated for elimination but had to compete in that round of the competition.
(WDR) The celebrity voluntarily withdrew from the competition.
(OUT) The celebrity lost the Elimination Challenge.

== Episodes ==
No. overall	No. in season	Title	Original release date
222	1	"El origen del sabor"	August 11, 2026
Quickfire Challenge: The celebrities had 60 minutes to prepare a dish that told their personal story. The winner received immunity and a secret advantage.: Winner: Aylín
223	2	"Cuatro manos, una meta"	August 12, 2026
Express Challenge: The celebrities competed in an express challenge of three stages: separate ten eggs, bread and fry three egg yolks, and whip egg whites by hand to stiff peaks. The winner received immunity from elimination.: Winner: Carlos F.; Team Challenge: The teams were given 60 minutes to prepare three different empanadas: one empanada with animal protein, one vegetarian empanada, and a third empanada of their choice. The members of the winning team each received four Silver Spoons to exchange for advantages in the competition, while the worst team was nominated for elimination.: Aquamarine Team: Nailea, Caramelo; Blue Team: Miguel, Lupillo; Beige Team: Kelly, Roberto; Gray Team: Gaby, José; Green Team: Nievelis, Athenea; Maroon Team: Divaza, Diana; Pink Team: Ninel, Mauricio; Red Team: Carlos F., Stephanie; Yellow Team: Guty, Carlos P.; Winners: Carlos F. and Stephanie; Nominated: Nailea and Caramelo
224	3	"La puntería decide"	August 13, 2026
Quickfire Challenge: The celebrities, working in teams assigned via knife draw, had 60 minutes to prepare three servings of any dish. Throughout the challenge, team captains could sabotage a team with challenges such as: slice 250 grams of onion, peel ginger, clean shrimp, among others. The top two teams moved on to the Immunity Challenge and each team member received three Silver Spoons.: Winners: Carlos F., Kelly, Mauricio, Ninel and Roberto; Carlos P., Miguel, Nailea and Stephanie; Immunity Challenge: The celebrities had to knock down bowling pins to obtain the ingredients written on them. Afterwards, they had 60 minutes to prepare their dish.: Winner: Ninel
225	4	"Empastelados"	August 14, 2026
Before the Quickfire Challenge began, Aylín's secret advantage was revealed: save one of the nominees, Caramelo or Nailea, from elimination. She decided to save Caramelo. Quickfire Challenge: The celebrities, working in pairs, had 75 minutes to recreate a cake. However, each member took turns preparing the cake within a specific time interval. The top three teams advanced to the Immunity Challenge.: Aquamarine Team: Athenea, José (6-layer chocolate cake with white chocolate filling); Beige Team: Caramelo, Gaby (4-layer vanilla cake with buttercream and strawberry filling); Blue Team: Divaza, Miguel (7-layer rainbow cake with pastry cream filling and buttercream frosting); Gray Team: Diana, Nievelis (8-layer chocolate cake with chocolate ganache and walnut filling); Green Team: Guty, Roberto (3-layer red velvet cake with cream cheese frosting filling); Pink Team: Kelly, Mauricio (10-layer coffee cake with caramel cream filling); Purple Team: Carlos P., Sheynnis (9-layer caramel cake with coconut pastry cream filling and buttercream); Red Team: Lupillo, Stephanie (5-layer poppy cake with lemon ganache); Winners: Guty and Roberto, Lupillo and Stephanie, Divaza and Miguel; Immunity Challenge: The celebrities were given 45 minutes to prepare hot dogs from scratch. The winner received immunity from elimination.: Winner: Lupillo
226	5	"Guerra de restaurantes"	August 16, 2026
Express Challenge: Immune celebrities Aylín, Carlos F., Lupillo and Ninel were asked to prepare seafood kabobs. The winner became a team captain in the Restaurant Wars Challenge and also named the captain of the opposing team.: Winner: Lupillo; Restaurant Wars Challenge: The celebrities competed in Top Chef's traditional Restaurant Wars challenge. Each team was responsible for running a restaurant that would serve 40 guests. The menus had to include a cold and a hot appetizer, two main dishes, one of them being vegetarian, and one dessert. The winning team was safe from elimination. Following the challenge, Ninel decided to withdraw from the competition, feeling she was not suited to compete in the show.: Boca de Cielo: Lupillo (C), Aylín, Carlos F., Carlos P., Divaza, Guty, José, Kelly, Roberto, Sheynnis; Camino al Paraíso: Ninel (C), Athenea, Caramelo, Diana, Gaby, Mauricio, Miguel, Nailea, Nievelis, Stephanie; Winners: Lupillo, Aylín, Carlos F., Carlos P., Divaza, Guty, José, Kelly, Roberto, Sheynnis
227	6	"La receta de la despedida"	August 17, 2026
Before the Safety Challenge began, Ninel decided to remain in the competition. Safety Challenge: The celebrities at risk of elimination selected a recipe written in emojis and had to interpret it in order to cook their dish and complete the challenge. The top four celebrities received three Silver Spoons each and were safe from elimination.: Athenea: Boneless chicken leg with lentil pâté; Caramelo: Creamy rice with chorizo and octopus; Diana: Salmon with pistachio and za'atar crust, cauliflower puree and sauce; Gaby: Chicken stuffed with spinach and blue cheese on a bed of polenta; Nailea: Risotto with cheese and caramelized walnuts; Nievelis: Meatballs in curry sauce served with basmati rice; Mauricio: Ribeye steak with miso butter served with orzo; Miguel: Tamarind and coffee glazed ribs served with aligot; Stephanie: Crispy chicken with sweet and sour sauce; Winners: Stephanie, Nailea, Mauricio, Gaby; Elimination Challenge: Athenea, Caramelo, Diana, Nievelis and Miguel had 45 minutes to prepare any dish.: Winner: Diana; Eliminated: Caramelo
228	7	"Un mercado inesperado"	August 18, 2026
Quickfire Challenge: The celebrities, working in teams assigned via knife draw, had 75 minutes to prepare a three-course meal, presenting three servings of each dish. Guty had the advantage of assigning the menus to each team. The top two teams moved on to the Immunity Challenge.: Winners: Aylín, José, Lupillo, Ninel and Roberto; Gaby, Guty, Nievelis and Stephanie; Immunity Challenge: The celebrities were given 45 minutes to cook any dish. The pantry was open for three minutes. Afterwards, the celebrities had to swap cooking stations and cook with the other's ingredients. The winner received immunity from elimination.: Winner: Lupillo; Since Lupillo won using Gaby's ingredients, she received four Silver Spoons.
229	8	"Platos que dejaron huella"	August 19, 2026
Safety Challenge #1: The celebrities, working in pairs, were asked to prepare a dish based on a memorable moment from previous seasons. The winners were from elimination.: Winners: Carlos F. and Carlos P.; Safety Challenge #2: The celebrities, working in teams of four, were given 60 minutes to individually prepare two servings of a dish. The team captain had to taste the four dishes prepared and choose which one to present to the judges. The winners were safe from elimination.: Winners: Athenea, Guty, José and Stephanie
230	9	"Complot a la cara"	August 20, 2026
Safety Challenge: The celebrities, working in pairs, had 45 minutes to cook any dish. The pantry was open for three minutes. Afterwards, they had to roll a die and a spinning top. The die determined the number of ingredients and the spinning top determined what would happen to those ingredients. The top three pairs were safe from elimination. The results of their rolls were: Aylín, Diana: Remove 5 of their own ingredients; Divaza, Sheynnis: Exchange 5 ingredients with Aylín and Diana; Gaby, Mauricio: Remove 5 of their own ingredients; Kelly, Ninel: Remove 4 ingredients from Aylín and Diana; Miguel, Nailea: Exchange 3 ingredients with Divaza and Sheynnis; Nievelis, Roberto: Remove 6 ingredients from Miguel and Nailea; Winners: Nievelis and Roberto, Kelly and Ninel, Gaby and Mauricio; Elimination Challenge: The celebrities were given 45 minutes to prepare soup.: Winner: Diana; Eliminated: Divaza
231	10	"La cocina se complica"	August 21, 2026
Quickfire Challenge: The celebrities, working in pairs, were given 40 minutes to prepare three servings of a dish that used chili peppers as the main ingredient. The pantry was open for three minutes. Carlos F. and Miguel redeemed seven of their Silver Spoons to receive three advantages: 60 minutes of cook time, an open pantry, and present only one serving of their dish to the judges. The top three teams advanced to the Immunity Challenge.: Aylín and Mauricio: rocoto; Athenea and Stephanie: jalapeño; Carlos F. and Miguel: poblano; Carlos P. and Guty: puya; Diana and Nailea: habanero; Gaby and Ninel: chiltepín; José and Roberto: chile de árbol; Kelly and Nievelis: ghost pepper; Lupillo and Sheynnis: Carolina reaper; Winners: Gaby and Ninel, Lupillo and Sheynnis, Kelly and Nievelis; Immunity Challenge: The celebrities had 45 minutes to prepare a dish using ingredients provided the judges and three mystery canned ingredients. The winner received immunity from elimination and a secret advantage.: Winner: Kelly
232	11	"Batalla de Food Trucks"	August 23, 2026
Express Challenge: The celebrities were asked to prepare mozzarella sticks with a sauce. Once a celebrity completed the challenge they were allowed to pick their team. Team Challenge: The celebrities were split into three teams and each team was responsible for running a food truck. The teams had 75 minutes to prepare three dishes for sixty guests. Kelly had the advantage of assigning the food trucks and dishes. The winning team was safe from elimination and each member received five Silver Spoons.: Blue Team: Nailea (C), Aylín, Carlos P., Guty, Miguel, Nievelis (Sushi, Pho, Thai fried rice); Maroon Team: Ninel (C), Athenea, Diana, José, Mauricio, Roberto (Patacones rellenos, Enchiladas, Nacatamales); Yellow Team: Kelly (C), Carlos F., Gaby, Lupillo, Sheynnis, Stephanie (Patatas bravas, Squid sandwich, Stuffed mushrooms); Winners: Kelly, Carlos F., Gaby, Lupillo, Sheynnis, Stephanie
233	12	"El ingrediente inesperado"	August 24, 2026
Safety Challenge: The celebrities at risk of elimination had 60 minutes to prepare a dish using an exotic protein. The top four celebrities were safe from elimination.: Athenea: pig head; Aylín: testicles; Carlos P.: chicken feet; Diana: beef heart; Guty: beef kidneys; José: chicken neck; Mauricio: suckermouth catfish; Miguel: beef tongue; Nailea: guinea pig; Nievelis: sea urchin; Ninel: beef brain; Roberto: tripe; Winners: Roberto, Ninel, Nailea, Athenea; Elimination Challenge: The celebrities were asked to prepare a dish using garlic and mushrooms as the main ingredients. Before the judges announced the eliminated celebrity, Carlos F. decided to withdraw from the competition in lieu of an elimination.: Withdrew: Carlos F.
234	13	"Sabores olvidados"	August 25, 2026
Before the Quickfire Challenge began, Kelly's secret advantage was revealed: give immunity to the celebrity of her choice. She chose Guty. Quickfire Challenge: The celebrities had to keep up with guest judge Chef Ruffo Ibarra in recreating his salmon with hollandaise sauce dish. The four celebrities to best replicate the dish advanced to the Immunity Challenge.: Winners: Carlos P., Nievelis, Kelly, Mauricio; Immunity Challenge: Carlos P., Kelly, Mauricio and Nievelis competed in a Forgotten Island-sponsored challenge, where they had 45 minutes to prepare a filipino dish. They were allowed to pick two celebrities to help them prepare their dish. The recipes were displayed on screens and the teams had to memorize them before they disappeared. The winner received immunity from elimination and shared a secret advantage with their teammates.: Aquamarine Team: Carlos P., Lupillo, Stephanie; Green Team: Kelly, Gaby, Ninel; Pink Team: Nievelis, Diana, Roberto; Purple Team: Mauricio, Guty, Nailea; Winner: Carlos P.
235	14	"Tensión a la mexicana"	August 26, 2026
Quickfire Challenge: The celebrities, working in teams, were asked to prepare a buffet that included three hot dishes and two cold dishes, one of them being Chiles en nogada. The top two teams competed in the Safety Challenge.: Blue Team: Athenea (C), José, Kelly, Mauricio, Nievelis; Maroon Team: Nailea (C), Carlos P., Guty, Lupillo, Miguel; Yellow Team: Stephanie (C), Diana, Gaby, Ninel, Roberto; Winners: Nailea, Carlos P., Guty, Lupillo and Miguel; Stephanie, Diana, Gaby, Ninel and Roberto; Safety Challenge: The celebrities, working in pairs, were given 45 prepare three servings of a main course and a dessert that used corn as the main ingredient. Gaby and Roberto redeemed seven of their Silver Spoons to receive three advantages: an open pantry, prepare an appetizer instead of a dessert, and present only one serving of their dishes to the judges. The top two pairs were safe from elimination.: Winners: Diana and Lupillo, Gaby and Roberto
236	15	"Noche de doble despedida"	August 27, 2026
Before the Safety Challenge began, Sheynnis announces that she has withdrawn from the competition for health reasons. Safety Challenge: The celebrities at risk of elimination were each given a basket with 15 ingredients. One at a time, the celebrities had to take 10 ingredients from one or more baskets. Afterwards, they had to cook with the ingredients that they stole and the top five celebrities were safe from elimination.: Winners: Ninel, Nailea, Miguel, Stephanie, Mauricio; Elimination Challenge: Athenea, José, Kelly and Nievelis had 45 minutes to prepare a dish using onions as the main ingredient.: Eliminated: Athenea
237	16	"Entre crepas y sombras"	August 28, 2026
Team Challenge: The teams were given 45 minutes to prepare three servings of any dish. One member of each team had three minutes to shop in the pantry, which was pitch black, while being guided by their teammates' voices. The top two teams advanced to the Immunity Challenge.: Aquamarine Team: Carlos P., Lupillo, Mauricio; Gray Team: Aylín, José, Roberto; Pink Team: Kelly, Nailea; Purple Team: Miguel, Nievelis, Stephanie; Red Team: Gaby, Guty, Ninel; Winners: Aylín, José, Roberto; Carlos P., Lupillo, Mauricio; Immunity Challenge: The celebrities were asked to prepare crepes. They had 10 minutes to shop in the pantry and prepare their mix, 20 minutes of mise en place, and 5 minutes to prepare their crepes in front of the judges. The winner received immunity from elimination.: Winner: Roberto
238	17	"El menú del sí, acepto"	August 30, 2026
Quickfire Challenge: Team captains Aylín, Lupillo and Roberto were challenged with preparing a bite-sized appetizer that would please a table composed of a pregnant woman, a 70-year-old man, a person on a gluten-free diet, a 7-year-old child, and a demanding foodie. The winner assigned the teams and the course they had to prepare in the Team Challenge.: Winner: Lupillo; Team Challenge: The teams catered a wedding with 100 guests. The blue team had 75 minutes to prepare the appetizer, the maroon team had 90 minutes to prepare the main course, and the yellow team was given 105 minutes to prepare the dessert. The winning team was safe from elimination.: Blue Team: Lupillo (C), Carlos P., Diana, Gaby, Ninel; Maroon Team: Aylín (C), Guty, José, Nailea, Stephanie; Yellow Team: Roberto (C), Kelly, Mauricio, Miguel, Nievelis; Winners: Lupillo, Carlos P., Diana, Gaby, Ninel
239	18	"Ingredientes de la discordia"	August 31, 2026
Safety Challenge: The celebrities at risk of elimination had 60 minutes to cook any dish, but an immune celebrity had to shop in the pantry for them. The top four celebrities were safe from elimination.: Winners: Guty, Nailea, Aylín, Mauricio; Elimination Challenge: The celebrities were given 45 minutes to prepare any dish.: Winner: Kelly; Eliminated: José
240	19	"La receta dibujada"	September 1, 2026
Quickfire Challenge: The celebrities were allowed to choose their partners for this challenge. In a charades-like game, one partner was chosen to draw and act out the ingredients of a dish, while the other prepared it based on the indications given. The top three pairs moved on to the Immunity Challenge.: Winners: Mauricio and Ninel, Kelly and Stephanie, Guty and Roberto; Immunity Challenge: The celebrities had 60 minutes to prepare a dish with a protein. Roberto, having won a knife draw, had the advantage of assigning proteins to his competitors and how many minutes to take off their cooking time. The winner received immunity from elimination. The proteins assigned and minutes reduced by Roberto were: Guty: Liver, -45; Kelly: Chunchullo, -30; Ninel: Osso Buco, -10; Mauricio: Duck magret, -40; Roberto: Tomahawk, -5; Stephanie: Pork ribs, -20; Winner: Guty
241	20	"Fogones al rojo vivo"	September 2, 2026
Quickfire Challenge: The celebrities, working in teams, were given 75 minutes to recreate a three-dimensional cake. The top two teams moved on to the Safety Challenge and each teammate received three Silver Spoons.: Blue Team: Aylín, Nailea, Ninel, Stephanie (Ribs cake); Green Team: Kelly, Nievelis, Roberto (Spaghetti cake); Maroon Team: Diana, Gaby, Lupillo (Hamburger cake); Yellow Team: Carlos P., Mauricio, Miguel (Nachos cake); Winners: Kelly, Nievelis and Roberto; Carlos P., Mauricio and Miguel; Safety Challenge: The celebrities, working in pairs, had 60 minutes to prepare a dish inspired by a holiday. The holidays were assigned via knife draw. The judges decided that all three pairs performed well and were saved from elimination.: Christmas: Roberto, Mauricio; Halloween: Carlos P., Miguel; Thanksgiving: Kelly, Nievelis
242	21	"La papa que deslumbra"	September 3, 2026
Safety Challenge: The celebrities were given 45 minutes to cook a dish inspired by the judges. The top two celebrities were safe from elimination.: Winners: Lupillo, Ninel; Eliminated Challenge: Diana, Gaby, Nailea and Stephanie were asked to prepare a dish using potatoes as the main ingredient.: Eliminated: Gaby
243	22	"Pequeños jueces, gran desafío"	September 4, 2026
Quickfire Challenge: The celebrities, working in teams, were asked to prepare a dish with an ingredient that children hate. The gray team redeemed eleven of their Silver Spoons to receive three advantages: choosing their ingredients first, assigning the selection order to the other teams, and 60 minutes of cook time. The top two teams qualified for the Immunity Challenge.: Aquamarine Team: Aylín, Diana, Nievelis (Eggplant); Gray Team: Kelly, Mauricio, Ninel (Spinach); Pink Team: Carlos P., Miguel, Nailea (Broccoli); Purple Team: Guty, Roberto, Stephanie (Blue cheese); Winners: Aylín, Diana and Nievelis; Kelly, Mauricio and Ninel; Immunity Challenge: The celebrities were randomly assigned a pasta and had 45 minutes to prepare it from scratch. The winner received immunity from elimination.: Diana: gnocchi; Kelly: pappardelle; Mauricio: ravioli; Nievelis: spaghetti; Ninel: cappelletti; Winner: Kelly
244	23	"Entre humo y sabor"	September 6, 2026
Express Challenge: The celebrities had to prepare a salad. Once a celebrity completed the challenge they were allowed to pick their team. Team Challenge: The teams were given 75 minutes to prepare a surf and turf barbecue meal accompanied by two sauces and a dessert. The winning team was safe from elimination.: Maroon Team: Guty (C), Aylín, Carlos P., Ninel, Roberto, Stephanie; Yellow Team: Nailea (C), Diana, Kelly, Mauricio, Miguel, Nievelis; Winners: Guty, Aylín, Carlos P., Ninel, Roberto, Stephanie
245	24	"Todos contra la paella"	September 7, 2026
Safety Challenge: The celebrities competed in a Royal Prestige-sponsored challenge where they had 60 minutes to prepare paella using the cookware company's 14-inch paella pan. The top two celebrities were safe from elimination.: Winners: Nievelis, Mauricio; Eliminated Challenge: The celebrities were given the same ingredients and had 45 minutes to prepare their dish. The pantry was closed.: Eliminated: Diana
246	25	"Refrán servido"	September 8, 2026
Quickfire Challenge: The celebrities worked in pairs to prepare a dish inspired by a proverb. The top three teams advanced to the Immunity Challenge.: Winners: Aylín and Roberto, Lupillo and Nievelis, Guty and Mauricio; Immunity Challenge: The celebrities were given 45 minutes to prepare a cold and a warm dish using geoduck as the main ingredient.: Ẃinner: Mauricio
247	26	"¡Manos a la pizza!"	September 9, 2026
Quickfire Challenge: The celebrities competed in a Quickfire Challenge of three stages. In the first stage, the celebrities were given 20 minutes to prepare a New York–style pizza, with the top eight advancing to the second stage. In the second stage, the celebrities had 20 minutes to prepare a calzone, with the top four advancing to the third stage. In the third stage, the celebrities were given 20 minutes to prepare a neapolitan pizza. The winner of the final round received immunity from elimination.: Ẃinner: Aylín
248	27	"Un plato en cada puerto"	September 10, 2026
Safety Challenge: The celebrities, working in pairs, had 60 minutes to prepare a dish inspired by different ports. The top three pairs were safe from elimination.: Blue Team: Guty, Roberto (Port Panama: Corvina ceviche); Green Team: Nailea, Nievelis (Port Croatia: Brudet); Maroon Team: Kelly, Stephanie (Port Fiji: Kokoda); Pink Team: Lupillo, Ninel (Port Bermuda: Fish chowder); Yellow Team: Carlos P., Miguel (Port Montenegro: Buzara); Winners: Kelly and Stephanie, Lupillo and Ninel, Guty and Roberto; Eliminated Challenge: Carlos P., Miguel, Nailea and Nievelis were given 45 minutes to prepare any dish.: Eliminated: Nievelis
249	28	"Sabores con encanto boricua"	September 11, 2026
Quickfire Challenge: The celebrities, working in pairs, were given 60 minutes to prepare three different dishes from Puerto Rico. The top three teams competed for immunity.: Winners: Kelly and Lupillo, Guty and Miguel, Nailea and Stephanie; Immunity Challenge: The celebrities had 70 minutes to prepare a Swiss roll and were randomly assigned a fruit for the filling flavor. Stephanie redeemed fifteen of her Silver Spoons to receive three advantages: the recipe to prepare a Swiss roll, 90 minutes of cook time, and exchange her assigned fruit. The winner received immunity from elimination.: Guty: Spanish lime; Kelly: strawberry; Lupillo: uchuva; Miguel: mandarin orange; Nailea: feijoa; Stephanie: lulo; Winner: Miguel
250	29	"Entre milhojas e insultos"	September 13, 2026
Quickfire Challenge: The celebrities were given 60 minutes to prepare milhojas. The winner was named team captain and had first pick in choosing their teammates.: Winner: Aylín; Team Challenge: Each team was responsible for running a food delivery service that would serve 40 customers. The menus had to include four protein options, four side dish options, one salad, one soup, and sauce options. The judges decided that both teams passed the challenge and both were safe from elimination.: Blue Team: Aylín (C), Carlos P., Guty, Lupillo, Ninel, Stephanie; Red Team: Miguel (C), Kelly, Mauricio, Nailea, Roberto
251	30	"Gajos de tensión"	September 14, 2026
Quickfire Challenge: The celebrities, working in teams, were given 45 minutes to cook any dish but the total weight of their ingredients had to be less than five pounds. The pantry was open for two minutes. The top two teams moved on to the Immunity Challenge.: Winners: Guty and Roberto; Kelly, Mauricio and Stephanie; Immunity Challenge: Guty, Kelly, Mauricio, Roberto and Stephanie were asked to prepare a dish using citric fruits as the main ingredient. The winner received immunity from elimination.: Winner: Kelly
252	31	"Nada se desaprovecha"	September 15, 2026
Quickfire Challenge: The celebrities, working in pairs, were given 60 minutes to prepare any dish, but they could only shop in the pantry once in order to reduce waste as much as possible. The top two teams advanced to the Immunity Challenge.: Winners: Carlos P. and Lupiilo, Guty and Roberto; Immunity Challenge: Carlos P., Guty, Lupillo and Roberto were given three minutes to shop in the pantry and 45 minutes to prepare any dish. When indicated, they had to choose a mystery box and add the ingredient it contained to their dish. The winner received immunity from elimination.: Winner: Roberto
253	32	"El "no" de la discordia"	September 16, 2026
Quickfire Challenge: The celebrities were given 45 minutes to prepare three tacos, three quesadillas, and a sauce. The top four celebrities moved on to the Safety Challenge.: Winners: Guty, Ninel, Aylín, Stephanie; Safety Challenge: The celebrities had 45 minutes to prepare a fusion dish. Guty competed against Ninel to prepare a dish combining ratatouille and filet mignon, while Aylín competed against Stephanie to prepare a dish combining moussaka and duck breast with orange sauce. The winner of each duel was safe from elimination.: Winners: Guty, Aylín
254	33	"Entre hierbas y discordias"	September 17, 2026
Safety Challenge: The celebrities were asked to recognize three herbs by smell or appearance and guess correctly in order to receive a herb. Afterwards, they had 45 minutes to prepare their dish. The top three celebrities were safe from elimination.: Winners: Ninel, Lupillo, Miguel; Elimination Challenge: Carlos P., Mauricio, Nailea and Stephanie had 60 minutes to prepare a stew.: Winner: Mauricio; Eliminated: Carlos P.
255	34	"Sabores a ciega"	September 18, 2026
Quickfire Challenge: The celebrities, working in teams, competed in the Black Box challenge. After entering the black box, which covered the celebrities in total darkness, each team had three minutes to taste, smell and feel a mystery dish. The teams then had 45 minutes to recreate the dish. The two teams with the most similar dishes advanced to the Immunity Challenge.: Winners: Aylín, Mauricio and Miguel; Guty and Kelly; Immunity Challenge: Aylín, Guty, Kelly, Mauricio and Miguel were challenged with scaling, filleting and cooking fish in 45 minutes. The winner received immunity from elimination.: Winner: Miguel
256	35	"Un bocado inconfundible"	September 20, 2026
Express Challenge: The celebrities had 20 minutes to prepare a cheese snack that had three textures. The winner assigned the pairs for the Safety Challenge.: Winner: Stephanie; Safety Challenge: The celebrities, working in pairs, were given 60 minutes to prepare a dish for 30 guests that used cheese as the main ingredient. The winning team was safe from elimination.: Winners: Guty, Ninel
257	36	"La presión de elegir"	September 21, 2026
Safety Challenge: The celebrities were given 45 minutes to cook any dish but could only use four utensils.: Winners: Lupillo, Roberto, Aylín; Elimination Challenge: Kelly, Mauricio, Nailea and Stephanie had 60 minutes to prepare a dish using root vegetables as their main ingredients.: Winner: Kelly; Eliminated: Stephanie
258	37	"El reto mejor guardado"	September 22, 2026
Quickfire Challenge: The celebrities, working in trios assigned via knife draw, had 45 minutes to prepare two dishes using only the ingredients found in the fridges of Top Chef VIP 4 contestants Angélica Celaya, Matías Ochoa and Norkys Batista. The winning trio advanced to the Immunity Challenge.: Winners: Kelly, Lupillo, Mauricio; Immunity Challenge: Kelly, Lupillo and Mauricio were given 75 minutes to butcher a pig and prepare a dish using four different cuts. The winner received immunity from elimination.: Winner: Mauricio
259	38	"Cita con sabor a verdad"	September 23, 2026
Quickfire Challenge: The celebrities were given 45 minutes to prepare a dish inspired by a romantic date. The top four celebrities moved on to the Safety Challenge.: Winners: Guty, Aylín, Ninel, Roberto; Safety Challenge: Aylín, Roberto, Ninel and Guty worked in pairs and had 35 minutes to prepare three servings of three different tartares: beef, seafood, and beet. The winning pair was safe from elimination.: Winners: Aylín, Roberto
260	39	"Una prueba accidentada"	September 24, 2026
Safety Challenge: The celebrities were challenged with preparing a vegetarian version of a classic international dish.: Winner: Kelly; Elimination Challenge: The celebrities had 45 minutes to prepare a lobster dish. While presenting his dish, Lupillo announces that he is withdrawing from the competition.: Withdrew: Lupillo
261	40	"Un festín a la española"	September 25, 2026
Quickfire Challenge: The celebrities were given 45 minutes to prepare a dish using cold cuts as their main ingredient. The top four celebrities competed for immunity.: Winners: Aylín, Roberto, Kelly, Nailea; Immunity Challenge: Aylín, Kelly, Nailea and Roberto were challenged with preparing a dessert that combined chocolate and avocado.: Winner: Aylín
262	41	"De regreso al fogón"	September 27, 2026
Eight previously eliminated celebrities competed against each other in two Re-entry Challenges for a chance to return the competition. Re-entry Challenge #1: The eliminated contestants were given 60 minutes to prepare a dish using tuna fish for the nine celebrities still in the competition, who would then vote for the contestant they wanted to return to the competition.: Winner: José Joel; Re-entry Challenge #2: The eliminated contestants were challenged with reinventing one of their previous dishes. The winner, chosen by the judges, returned to the competition.: Winner: Lupillo
263	42	"Una segunda oportunidad"	September 28, 2026
Athenea, Caramelo, Carlos P., Diana, Divaza and Nievelis continued to compete for a chance to re-enter the competition. Re-entry Challenge #1: The eliminated contestants were given 70 minutes to prepare a dish with a protein. They had to bid on the protein they wanted and in order to pay for it, they had to give up minutes from their cooking time. The top three celebrities advanced to a second Quickfire Challenge. The protein chosen and minutes reduced from their cooking time were: Athenea: chicken wings for 20 minutes; Caramelo: pork kidney for 15 minutes; Carlos P.: duck breast for 15 minutes; Diana: short rib for 15 minutes; Divaza: tofu for 20 minutes; Nievelis: tomahawk pork chop for 15 minutes; Winners: Carlos P., Nievelis, Diana; Re-entry Challenge #2: Carlos P., Diana and Nievelis had 60 minutes to prepare any dish. The winner returned to the competition.: Winner: Nievelis
264	43	"La batalla del brunch"	September 29, 2026
Quickfire Challenge: The celebrities, working in teams, were asked to prepare a brunch buffet for the judges and 40 guests that would vote for the winner. The buffets had to included a cold dish, hot dish, sweets, and drinks. The blue team redeemed eleven of their Silver Spoons to add Aylín, who was immune from elimination, to their team. The blue team won by a vote of 26–17 and competed in the Immunity Challenge.: Blue Team: Aylín, Kelly, Lupillo, Miguel, Nailea, Roberto; Red Team: Guty, José, Mauricio, Nievelis, Ninel; Winners: Aylín, Kelly, Lupillo, Miguel, Nailea, Roberto; Immunity Challenge: Kelly, Lupillo, Miguel, Nailea, Roberto had 45 minutes to transform street food into a gourmet dish. Kelly won a knife draw that allowed her to assign the street foods. The winner received a secret advantage and immunity from elimination.: Kelly: burrito; Lupillo: hamburger; Miguel: Philly cheesesteak; Nailea: Korean fried chicken; Roberto: gyros; Winner: Kelly
265	44	"Recetas a imagen y semejanza"	September 30, 2026
Quickfire Challenge: The celebrities had to cook a dish while simultaneously giving instructions to their partner, hidden behind a wall, on how to prepare the same dish. They were judged based on how closely both dishes resembled each other in terms of taste and presentation. The top three pairs qualified for the Safety Challenge.: Winners: Guty and Nievelis, Mauricio and Nailea, Miguel and Roberto; Safety Challenge: The celebrities, who once again worked with their Quickfire Challenge partners, were given 60 minutes to prepare three tamales. The winning pair was safe from elimination.: Winners: Miguel and Roberto
266	45	"Por un lugar en el Top 10"	October 1, 2026
Safety Challenge: The celebrities were given two minutes to shop in the pantry. A knife draw was held to determine the order the celebrities would exchange baskets. Afterwards, they had 45 minutes to prepare a dish with their new ingredients. The winners were safe from elimination.: Winners: Nievelis, Lupillo, Ninel; Elimination Challenge: Guty, José, Mauricio and Nailea had 60 minutes to prepare any dish.: Eliminated: José
267	46	"El sabor del merengue"	October 2, 2026
Quickfire Challenge: The celebrities had 60 minutes to prepare a dish that included meringue. Top Chef VIP 4 contestant Elvis Crespo was the guest judge. The top four celebrities competed in the Immunity Challenge.: Winners: Guty, Kelly, Roberto, Miguel; Immunity Challenge: Guty, Kelly, Roberto, Miguel were given 45 minutes to prepare a seafood dish. The winner received immunity from elimination.: Winner: Guty
268	47	"Desayuno con turbulencias"	October 4, 2026
Quickfire Challenge: The celebrities were given 30 minutes to prepare a breakfast meal. The winner was named captain of the Yellow Team and assigned the teams.: Winner: Nailea; Team Challenge: The teams were asked to prepare a pasta dish and a chicken dish for 20 guests. The winning team was safe from elimination.: Maroon Team: Guty (C), Nievelis, Mauricio, Roberto; Yellow Team: Nailea (C), Aylín, Kelly, Miguel; Winners: Guty, Nievelis, Mauricio, Roberto
269	48	"El amargo sabor de la despedida"	October 5, 2026
Safety Challenge: The celebrities had 45 minutest to prepare stuffed arepas. The top two celebrities were safe from elimination.: Winners: Lupillo, Ninel; Elimination Challenge: Aylín, Kelly, Miguel and Nailea were given 60 minutes to cook a pork belly dish.: Eliminated: Nailea
270	49	"En buenas manos"	October 6, 2026
Before the Quickfire Challenge began, it was revealed that Kelly's unused secret advantage was the ability to annul José Joel or Nailea's elimination. Quickfire Challenge: The celebrities, working in trios, were given 75 minutes to prepare a four-course meal. The teams were assisted by Top Chef VIP 2 winner Alana Lliteras. The winning team competed in the Immunity Challenge.: Winners: Aylín, Guty, Miguel; Immunity Challenge: Aylín, Guty, Miguel were asked to prepare a dish using ingredients they could see from a transparent box or choose ingredients blindly from a black box. Guty and Miguel chose the black box and had 60 minutes to cook their dish, while Aylín redeemed five Silver Spoons to have the advantage of cooking with ingredients from both boxes and also had 60 minutes of cooking time. The winner received five Silver Spoons and immunity from elimination.: Winner: Guty
271	50	"Sin memoria no hay paraíso"	October 7, 2026
Quickfire Challenge: The celebrities competed in a Sin senos sí hay paraíso 4-sponsored challenge, where they had to prepare a dish inspired by a character from the series. The top four celebrities competed in the Safety Challenge.: Winners: Ninel, Nievelis, Mauricio, Kelly; Safety Challenge: Kelly, Mauricio, Nievelis and Ninel, working in pairs, were given 45 minutes to prepare fried chicken accompanied by three different sauces: one raw, one roasted, and one sweet and sour. The winning pair was safe from elimination.: Winners: Kelly, Ninel
272	51	"Una estrella en la cocina"	October 8, 2026
Safety Challenge: The celebrities had 45 minutes to prepare a dish that combined ingredients from three regions (Desert, Sea, Valley) of Baja California. The top three celebrities were safe from elimination.: Winners: Aylín, Lupillo, Roberto; Elimination Challenge: Mauricio, Miguel and Nievelis were given 45 minutes to prepare any dish.: Eliminated: Nievelis
273	52	"A prueba de favoritismos"	October 9, 2026
Quickfire Challenge: The celebrities were given 45 minutes to cook any dish and the judges blind tasted them. The top four celebrities competed in the final Immunity Challenge.: Winners: Roberto, Miguel, Ninel, Lupillo; Immunity Challenge: Lupillo, Miguel, Ninel and Roberto had 45 minutes to prepare a dish using insects as their main ingredient. The winner received the final immunity from elimination.: Winner: Ninel
274	53	"La receta ganadora"	October 11, 2026
Quickfire Challenge: The celebrities had 75 minutes to replicate Cristina Porta's winning dish from season four. The four celebrities to best replicate the dish competed in the Safety Challenge.: Winners: Mauricio, Kelly, Aylín, Roberto; Safety Challenge: Aylín, Kelly, Roberto and Mauricio, working in pairs, were given 45 minutes to prepare a Caribbean appetizer and main dish. The winning pair was safe from elimination.: Winners: Kelly, Roberto
275	54	"Tres mesas, miles de sabores"	October 12, 2026
Safety Challenge: Aylín, Guty, Lupillo, Mauricio and Miguel were challenged with preparing a dish served in three different types of plating. The winners were safe from elimination.: Winners: Guty, Lupillo; Elimination Challenge: Aylín, Mauricio and Miguel had 45 minutes to cook a dish using the judges' favorite ingredients.: Winner: Mauricio; Eliminated: Miguel
276	55	"Chefs de un solo color"	October 13, 2026
Quickfire Challenge: The celebrities were randomly assigned a color and had 45 minutes to prepare a monochromatic dish. The top three celebrities advanced to the Semifinal Qualifying Challenge.: Winners: Aylín, Mauricio, Kelly; Semifinal Qualifying Challenge: Aylín, Kelly and Mauricio were given 60 minutes to prepare a dessert. They were only allowed to enter the pantry once. The winner advanced to the Semifinal.: Winner: Mauricio
277	56	"Platos con sabor a infancia"	October 14, 2026
Quickfire Challenge: The celebrities were challenged with preparing a dish based on their childhood memories. The top three celebrities moved on to the Semifinal Qualifying Challenge.: Winners: Ninel, Kelly, Roberto; Semifinal Qualifying Challenge: Kelly, Ninel and Roberto were given 60 minutes to prepare a classic Latin dish using at least three ingredients from another region. The top two celebrities qualified for the Semifinal. The dishes and regions assigned were: Kelly: Reina pepiada and North Africa; Ninel: Tiradito and Asia; Roberto: Cochinita pibil and India; Winners: Kelly, Ninel
278	57	"Con el fuego al máximo"	October 15, 2026
Semifinal Qualifying Challenge #1: Aylín, Guty, Lupillo and Roberto were given 45 minutes to prepare a dish using rabbit, pork or lamb. The winner became the fourth semifinalist.: Winner: Lupillo; Semifinal Qualifying Challenge #2: Aylín, Guty and Roberto had 45 minutes to prepare a dish using poultry. The winner became the fifth semifinalist.: Winner: Guty; Semifinal Qualifying Challenge #3: Aylín and Roberto were given 45 minutes to prepare a seafood dish. The winner became the sixth and final semifinalist.: Winner: Roberto; Eliminated: Aylín
279	58	"Una mesa muy especial"	October 16, 2026
Semifinal: The top 6 celebrities were given 60 minutes to prepare a family-style dish. Each celebrity had to present two servings of the same dish, one for the judges and another for their friends and family. The cooking order was based on who qualified for the semifinal first. The winners advanced to the Finale.: Winners: Lupillo, Ninel
280	59	"La última oportunidad"	October 18, 2026
Semifinal: Guty, Kelly, Mauricio and Roberto were given 75 minutes to prepare five servings of a dish that included ingredients from Colombian cuisine. World-renowned chefs Patrick Cros and Jacobo Bonilla served as guest judges. A knife draw determined the cooking order. The winners advanced to the Finale.: Winners: Guty, Kelly; Eliminated: Mauricio, Roberto
281	60	"El título está servido"	October 19, 2026
Finale: Guty, Kelly, Lupillo and Ninel had to prepare a three-course meal. They were given 60 minutes to prepare an appetizer, 75 minutes for the main course, and 90 minutes for a dessert.: Winner: Guty; Runners-up: Kelly, Lupillo, Ninel
