= List of Top Chef VIP episodes =

Top Chef VIP is an American reality competition television series that premiered on August 9, 2022, on Telemundo. The show features celebrities competing against each other in various culinary challenges. They are judged by a panel of professional chefs with two or more contestants eliminated each week. In October 2025, Telemundo renewed the series for a fifth season that premiered on August 11, 2026.

As of October 19, 2026, 281 episodes of Top Chef VIP have aired, concluding the fifth season.

== Series overview ==
Season	Episodes	Originally released	
Season	Episodes	First released	Last released
1	35	August 9, 2022	September 26, 2022
2	60	April 25, 2023	July 17, 2023
3	60	May 21, 2024	July 29, 2024
4	66	July 22, 2025	October 6, 2025
5	60	August 11, 2026	October 19, 2026

== Episodes ==
=== Season 1 (2022) ===
No. overall	No. in season	Title	Original release date	US viewers (millions)
1	1	"Se encienden los fogones"	August 9, 2022	1.11
2	2	"Cocineros en aprietos"	August 10, 2022	1.05
3	3	"Tras un gol culinario"	August 11, 2022	0.83
4	4	"Sol, arena y buena masa"	August 12, 2022	0.83
5	5	"En la cuerda floja"	August 15, 2022	0.92
6	6	"Drama, sabor y diversion"	August 16, 2022	0.87
7	7	"Misión imposible"	August 17, 2022	1.00
8	8	"Al borde del precipicio"	August 18, 2022	0.98
9	9	"Banquete con nervios de acero"	August 19, 2022	0.97
10	10	"Uno menos"	August 22, 2022	1.06
11	11	"Superar el rechazo"	August 23, 2022	0.97
12	12	"Viva la fritanga"	August 24, 2022	1.08
13	13	"Perder para ganar"	August 25, 2022	1.04
14	14	"Homenaje al "Divo de Juárez""	August 26, 2022	1.04
15	15	"Llanto en la cocina"	August 29, 2022	0.90
16	16	"La dulce inmunidad"	August 30, 2022	0.90
17	17	"A jugar, 'Verdad o Reto'"	August 31, 2022	1.19
18	18	"Proteína de alto riesgo"	September 1, 2022	0.94
19	19	"Pecados imperdonables"	September 2, 2022	1.02
20	20	"Todos corren peligro"	September 5, 2022	1.14
21	21	"Preparando con amor"	September 6, 2022	1.02
22	22	"La ruleta de la suerte"	September 7, 2022	1.14
23	23	"Un sueño que termina"	September 8, 2022	1.06
24	24	"Bienvenidos"	September 9, 2022	1.01
25	25	"Quesadillas de pesadilla"	September 12, 2022	1.00
26	26	"Cata a ciegas"	September 13, 2022	1.07
27	27	"Entre gustos y colores"	September 14, 2022	1.05
28	28	"El peso de lo inesperado"	September 15, 2022	0.95
29	29	"Sabor a hispanidad"	September 16, 2022	0.83
30	30	"Cuenta regresiva"	September 19, 2022	0.98
31	31	"Oído chef"	September 20, 2022	1.09
32	32	"Dulce y amargo"	September 21, 2022	1.18
33	33	"Cocina con magia"	September 22, 2022	1.01
34	34	"Un nivel de excelencia"	September 23, 2022	1.17
35	35	"Una experiencia incomparable"	September 26, 2022	1.26

=== Season 2 (2023) ===
No. overall	No. in season	Title	Original release date	US viewers (millions)
36	1	"El as bajo la manga"	April 25, 2023	0.97
37	2	"Ingenio, habilidad y sazón"	April 26, 2023	0.89
38	3	"En busca de la primera inmunidad"	April 27, 2023	0.77
39	4	"En el mar la vida es más sabrosa"	April 28, 2023	0.87
40	5	"Emociones al toque"	May 1, 2023	0.96
41	6	"Cocineros de cabeza"	May 2, 2023	0.88
42	7	"Cachete y colita"	May 3, 2023	0.88
43	8	"Innovar desde la tradición"	May 4, 2023	0.85
44	9	"En la tierra del mariachi"	May 5, 2023	0.85
45	10	"La muerte del bogavante"	May 8, 2023	1.00
46	11	"Por el "Cuchillo de oro""	May 9, 2023	1.02
47	12	"Cocina del corazón"	May 10, 2023	0.81
48	13	"Sinergia gastronómica"	May 11, 2023	0.91
49	14	"Inspirados en Oaxaca"	May 12, 2023	0.83
50	15	"El último plato"	May 15, 2023	1.00
51	16	"A toda velocidad"	May 16, 2023	0.92
52	17	"Platillos reciclados y tradicionales"	May 17, 2023	0.96
53	18	"Clase magistral con la chef Adria"	May 18, 2023	0.86
54	19	"A dominar el fuego"	May 19, 2023	0.76
55	20	"Armas de doble filo"	May 22, 2023	0.93
56	21	"A la espera de un milagro"	May 23, 2023	0.77
57	22	"Mezclas insólitas"	May 24, 2023	0.95
58	23	"Bajo presión"	May 25, 2023	0.87
59	24	"Fiesta de manteles largos"	May 26, 2023	0.77
60	25	"Corazones desbocados"	May 29, 2023	0.87
61	26	"Batalla por la capitanía"	May 30, 2023	0.87
62	27	"A ciegas"	May 31, 2023	0.88
63	28	"En la trattoria"	June 1, 2023	0.83
64	29	"Manos a la ubre"	June 2, 2023	0.72
65	30	"Palpitaciones alteradas"	June 5, 2023	0.87
66	31	"Un muro entre nosotros"	June 6, 2023	0.75
67	32	"La unión hace la fuerza"	June 7, 2023	0.74
68	33	"Los espejos del chef"	June 8, 2023	0.82
69	34	"Un chin de fritura tradicional"	June 9, 2023	0.66
70	35	"No todo es cuestión de suerte"	June 12, 2023	0.86
71	36	"Arte culinario, risas y hasta boda"	June 13, 2023	0.82
72	37	"Verbena mexicana"	June 14, 2023	0.93
73	38	"Un reto Elemental"	June 15, 2023	0.80
74	39	"Tirantez en el viñedo"	June 16, 2023	0.90
75	40	"Al cuadrilátero"	June 19, 2023	0.88
76	41	"Copiar al experto"	June 20, 2023	0.90
77	42	"Aperitivo locochón"	June 21, 2023	0.85
78	43	"Orientación de lujo"	June 22, 2023	0.90
79	44	"Lucha callejera"	June 23, 2023	0.83
80	45	"Salvación con sabor a mar"	June 26, 2023	0.95
81	46	"Sabor a familia"	June 27, 2023	0.89
82	47	"Ni visitas, ni consejos"	June 28, 2023	0.86
83	48	"El reto más amargo"	June 29, 2023	0.93
84	49	"Reencuentro en Cartagena"	June 30, 2023	0.91
85	50	"Honrosa despedida"	July 3, 2023	0.89
86	51	"Feliz Día de la Independencia"	July 4, 2023	0.61
87	52	"Pelea por la salvación"	July 5, 2023	0.84
88	53	"Cuatro celebridades están en riesgo"	July 6, 2023	0.90
89	54	"Comienza la recta final"	July 7, 2023	0.85
90	55	"Con un toque personal"	July 10, 2023	0.97
91	56	"Llueven las críticas"	July 11, 2023	0.88
92	57	"A cuentagotas"	July 12, 2023	0.87
93	58	"El primer pase de la semifinal"	July 13, 2023	1.00
94	59	"Listos para la final"	July 14, 2023	0.92
95	60	"La última batalla"	July 17, 2023	1.09

=== Season 3 (2024) ===
No. overall	No. in season	Title	Original release date	US viewers (millions)
96	1	"La cocina abre sus puertas"	May 21, 2024	0.91
97	2	"Una dificultad tras otra"	May 22, 2024	0.84
98	3	"El misterio en una caja"	May 23, 2024	0.87
99	4	"Lidiar con la frustración"	May 24, 2024	0.84
100	5	"La búsqueda del tesoro"	May 26, 2024	0.64
101	6	"Llega la primera eliminación"	May 27, 2024	0.83
102	7	"La visita de un experto"	May 28, 2024	0.89
103	8	"Entre gustos y colores"	May 29, 2024	0.85
104	9	"Manos a la masa"	May 30, 2024	0.74
105	10	"Ahí está el dilema"	May 31, 2024	0.80
106	11	"Sabor a triunfo"	June 2, 2024	N/A
107	12	"Miedo en la cocina"	June 3, 2024	N/A
108	13	"Memorias"	June 4, 2024	N/A
109	14	"Llega el quinto"	June 5, 2024	N/A
110	15	"Besitos de coco"	June 6, 2024	N/A
111	16	"El teléfono roto"	June 7, 2024	N/A
112	17	"Amigos y rivales"	June 9, 2024	N/A
113	18	"Quinta eliminación"	June 10, 2024	N/A
114	19	"Postre sobre la mesa"	June 11, 2024	N/A
115	20	"Quesadillas, enfados y llanto"	June 12, 2024	N/A
116	21	"La miel a veces es amarga"	June 13, 2024	N/A
117	22	"Noche de emociones"	June 14, 2024	N/A
118	23	"Ayudantes de lujo"	June 16, 2024	N/A
119	24	"A oscuras"	June 17, 2024	N/A
120	25	"El muro"	June 18, 2024	N/A
121	26	"Sabor mexicano"	June 19, 2024	N/A
122	27	"Una eliminación amarga"	June 20, 2024	N/A
123	28	"Sexto sentido"	June 21, 2024	N/A
124	29	"La boda"	June 23, 2024	N/A
125	30	"Al ritmo del chef"	June 24, 2024	N/A
126	31	"Personajes de película"	June 25, 2024	N/A
127	32	"Vergüenza propia"	June 26, 2024	N/A
128	33	"Cuatro celebridades en riesgo"	June 27, 2024	N/A
129	34	"Dulce y salado"	June 28, 2024	N/A
130	35	"La feria de las vanidades"	June 30, 2024	N/A
131	36	"Cuatro contra el mundo"	July 1, 2024	N/A
132	37	"Cinco exparticipantes de visita"	July 2, 2024	N/A
133	38	"Chefs a ciegas"	July 3, 2024	N/A
134	39	"Happy 4th of July"	July 4, 2024	N/A
135	40	"Chispas en la cava"	July 5, 2024	N/A
136	41	"Entre sustos y criaturas de terror"	July 7, 2024	N/A
137	42	"Los Mosqueteros en peligro"	July 8, 2024	N/A
138	43	"Guerra total"	July 9, 2024	N/A
139	44	"Dulce salvación"	July 10, 2024	N/A
140	45	"La eliminación más decepcionante"	July 11, 2024	N/A
141	46	"Reencuentro no tan deseado"	July 12, 2024	N/A
142	47	"Batalla sobre ruedas"	July 14, 2024	N/A
143	48	"Una nueva despedida"	July 15, 2024	N/A
144	49	"Alanadas para la inmunidad"	July 16, 2024	N/A
145	50	"Cocina con corazón"	July 17, 2024	N/A
146	51	"Décima tercera eliminación"	July 18, 2024	N/A
147	52	"La última inmunidad"	July 19, 2024	N/A
148	53	"Eliminación sin electricidad"	July 21, 2024	N/A
149	54	"Primer semifinalista"	July 22, 2024	N/A
150	55	"Que la suerte te acompañe"	July 23, 2024	N/A
151	56	"Con las emociones a flor de piel"	July 24, 2024	N/A
152	57	"Se acaban los cupos"	July 25, 2024	N/A
153	58	"Primer finalista"	July 26, 2024	N/A
154	59	"A un paso"	July 28, 2024	N/A
155	60	"El menú de la victoria"	July 29, 2024	1.30

=== Season 4 (2025) ===
No. overall	No. in season	Title	Original release date
156	1	"La primera inmunidad culinaria"	July 22, 2025
157	2	"Celos, gritos y acusaciones"	July 23, 2025
158	3	"Personajes de película contrarreloj"	July 24, 2025
159	4	"El robo de la inmunidad"	July 25, 2025
160	5	"Sabor español en un pueblo colonial"	July 27, 2025
161	6	"Primera eliminación a fuego alto"	July 28, 2025
162	7	"Enfados, juegos de azar y lágrimas"	July 29, 2025
163	8	"Cabeza de uno y manos de otro"	July 30, 2025
164	9	"Salvar el cuello"	July 31, 2025
165	10	"Mercado a ciegas"	August 1, 2025
166	11	"El dominio del fuego"	August 3, 2025
167	12	"La sopa de la eliminación"	August 4, 2025
168	13	"Demasiado corazón"	August 5, 2025
169	14	"Celia Cruz y los clásicos mexicanos"	August 6, 2025
170	15	"Una eliminación inesperada"	August 7, 2025
171	16	"Regreso polémico y doble inmunidad"	August 8, 2025
172	17	"Una promesa de amor en el Caribe"	August 10, 2025
173	18	"Lágrimas en la quinta eliminación"	August 11, 2025
174	19	"Reencuentros y reloj implacable"	August 12, 2025
175	20	"Tradición italiana con desacuerdos"	August 13, 2025
176	21	"Diferencias irreconciliables"	August 14, 2025
177	22	"La sorpresa que nadie querría"	August 15, 2025
178	23	"Batalla sobre ruedas"	August 17, 2025
179	24	"Noche de octava eliminación"	August 18, 2025
180	25	"Niños al poder y nueva inmunidad"	August 19, 2025
181	26	"Infracciones y mentiras"	August 20, 2025
182	27	"Seis robos y una eliminación"	August 21, 2025
183	28	"Un muro entre los dos"	August 22, 2025
184	29	"Capitana por descarte y sabotaje"	August 24, 2025
185	30	"¿Lágrimas simuladas o reales?"	August 25, 2025
186	31	"Inmunes y rivales"	August 26, 2025
187	32	"Familia disfuncional"	August 27, 2025
188	33	"Citas románticas y granos milenarios"	August 28, 2025
189	34	"Invitados VIP y lucha por inmunidad"	August 29, 2025
190	35	"Joropo y cocina llanera"	August 31, 2025
191	36	"Rivales en la cava y lucha en cocina"	September 1, 2025
192	37	"Partido por la inmunidad"	September 2, 2025
193	38	"Promesas incumplidas y un veredicto"	September 3, 2025
194	39	"Una preparación impecable"	September 4, 2025
195	40	"La última ventaja en juego"	September 5, 2025
196	41	"El fútbol como protagonista"	September 7, 2025
197	42	"Eliminación sin precedentes"	September 8, 2025
198	43	"Sabores de México, enfado y huelga"	September 9, 2025
199	44	"A las puertas de una eliminación"	September 10, 2025
200	45	"Desconcierto y lágrimas"	September 11, 2025
201	46	"Remanso de paz"	September 12, 2025
202	47	"El pasado regresa, parte 1"	September 14, 2025
203	48	"El pasado regresa, parte 2"	September 15, 2025
204	49	"El maíz y el camino a la inmunidad"	September 16, 2025
205	50	"Catering y platos con insectos"	September 17, 2025
206	51	"Clásicos internacionales y un adiós"	September 18, 2025
207	52	"Papas y huevos para la inmunidad"	September 19, 2025
208	53	"Teléfono descompuesto y mini postres"	September 21, 2025
209	54	"Del abismo al cielo en un mismo día"	September 22, 2025
210	55	"Las reglas son para cumplirlas"	September 23, 2025
211	56	"Dos retos para una inmunidad"	September 24, 2025
212	57	"Regreso sorpresivo"	September 25, 2025
213	58	"Un giro asombroso"	September 26, 2025
214	59	"El primer cupo en la semifinal"	September 28, 2025
215	60	"Cacao, cítricos y muchos nervios"	September 29, 2025
216	61	"Sabor peruano rumbo a la semifinal"	September 30, 2025
217	62	"Fusión latina por el cuarto pase"	October 1, 2025
218	63	"Seis semifinalistas, un triste adiós"	October 2, 2025
219	64	"Primer finalista desde Barranquilla"	October 3, 2025
220	65	"Tres finalistas y dos despedidas"	October 5, 2025
221	66	"Tres platos hacia la victoria"	October 6, 2025

=== Season 5 (2026) ===
No. overall	No. in season	Title	Original release date
222	1	"El origen del sabor"	August 11, 2026
223	2	"Cuatro manos, una meta"	August 12, 2026
224	3	"La puntería decide"	August 13, 2026
225	4	"Empastelados"	August 14, 2026
226	5	"Guerra de restaurantes"	August 16, 2026
227	6	"La receta de la despedida"	August 17, 2026
228	7	"Un mercado inesperado"	August 18, 2026
229	8	"Platos que dejaron huella"	August 19, 2026
230	9	"Complot a la cara"	August 20, 2026
231	10	"La cocina se complica"	August 21, 2026
232	11	"Batalla de Food Trucks"	August 23, 2026
233	12	"El ingrediente inesperado"	August 24, 2026
234	13	"Sabores olvidados"	August 25, 2026
235	14	"Tensión a la mexicana"	August 26, 2026
236	15	"Noche de doble despedida"	August 27, 2026
237	16	"Entre crepas y sombras"	August 28, 2026
238	17	"El menú del sí, acepto"	August 30, 2026
239	18	"Ingredientes de la discordia"	August 31, 2026
240	19	"La receta dibujada"	September 1, 2026
241	20	"Fogones al rojo vivo"	September 2, 2026
242	21	"La papa que deslumbra"	September 3, 2026
243	22	"Pequeños jueces, gran desafío"	September 4, 2026
244	23	"Entre humo y sabor"	September 6, 2026
245	24	"Todos contra la paella"	September 7, 2026
246	25	"Refrán servido"	September 8, 2026
247	26	"¡Manos a la pizza!"	September 9, 2026
248	27	"Un plato en cada puerto"	September 10, 2026
249	28	"Sabores con encanto boricua"	September 11, 2026
250	29	"Entre milhojas e insultos"	September 13, 2026
251	30	"Gajos de tensión"	September 14, 2026
252	31	"Nada se desaprovecha"	September 15, 2026
253	32	"El "no" de la discordia"	September 16, 2026
254	33	"Entre hierbas y discordias"	September 17, 2026
255	34	"Sabores a ciega"	September 18, 2026
256	35	"Un bocado inconfundible"	September 20, 2026
257	36	"La presión de elegir"	September 21, 2026
258	37	"El reto mejor guardado"	September 22, 2026
259	38	"Cita con sabor a verdad"	September 23, 2026
260	39	"Una prueba accidentada"	September 24, 2026
261	40	"Un festín a la española"	September 25, 2026
262	41	"De regreso al fogón"	September 27, 2026
263	42	"Una segunda oportunidad"	September 28, 2026
264	43	"La batalla del brunch"	September 29, 2026
265	44	"Recetas a imagen y semejanza"	September 30, 2026
266	45	"Por un lugar en el Top 10"	October 1, 2026
267	46	"El sabor del merengue"	October 2, 2026
268	47	"Desayuno con turbulencias"	October 4, 2026
269	48	"El amargo sabor de la despedida"	October 5, 2026
270	49	"En buenas manos"	October 6, 2026
271	50	"Sin memoria no hay paraíso"	October 7, 2026
272	51	"Una estrella en la cocina"	October 8, 2026
273	52	"A prueba de favoritismos"	October 9, 2026
274	53	"La receta ganadora"	October 11, 2026
275	54	"Tres mesas, miles de sabores"	October 12, 2026
276	55	"Chefs de un solo color"	October 13, 2026
277	56	"Platos con sabor a infancia"	October 14, 2026
278	57	"Con el fuego al máximo"	October 15, 2026
279	58	"Una mesa muy especial"	October 16, 2026
280	59	"La última oportunidad"	October 18, 2026
281	60	"El título está servido"	October 19, 2026
