= Inés Páez Nin =

Dominican chef, activist and television personality

Inés Páez Nin (Chef Tita)
- Born: 1979 (age 46–47); Santo Domingo, Dominican Republic
- Other name: Chef Tita
- Occupations: Chef; Activist; Television celebrity
- Notable work: MasterChef República Dominicana (2018)

Inés Páez Nin (born in 1979 in Santo Domingo), also known as Chef Tita, is a Dominican chef, activist and television personality. Owner of MoriSoñando and Aguají restaurants, Páez is a member of the Dominican Chefs Association, has been a judge on several versions of the reality show MasterChef and has represented her country in different international cooking festivals.

Páez participated in the creation of the Gastronomic Diplomacy program with the Ministry of External Relations of the Dominican Republic, with which she has visited several countries around the world promoting the gastronomic culture of her country. In 2023, she was included in the list of the 50 Powerful Women in the Dominican Republic, created by Forbes magazine.

== Biography ==
=== Beginnings and academic background ===
Working as a cook since the age of seventeen, Paez graduated in Hotel Management and Tourism at the Universidad Iberoamericana UNIBE with an internship at the Tryp Bosque Hotel in Palma de Mallorca, where she worked with chef Martín Berasategui. She later obtained a diploma in Culinary Arts at the Pontificia Universidad Catolica Madre y Maestra and a certification from the Culinary Institute of America.

=== Career ===
Representing the Dominican Republic, Páez has participated in several international gastronomic festivals like Sabores Barranquilla and the Guadalupe Gastronomic Festival in 2013, the Latin American Gastronomy Festival in New Delhi in 2014 and the Dominican Gastronomic Festival in La Florida in 2015 and 2017, among others. In 2013 she was in charge of the gala dinner of the Economic Commission for Latin America, held at the National Palace.

In 2017 she was recognized by the United States Congress "for her work to rescue, reinvent and project Dominican gastronomy". Two years later she received the Personaje Excelencia Gourmet award in a ceremony held during the International Tourism Fair in Madrid. In 2021 she received the Medal of Merit for Dominican Women in the category of culture and culinary arts, in an event held at the Eduardo Brito National Theater. In 2023 she won an award at the La Liste Special Awards in Paris, France.

She is the owner of MoriSoñando restaurant, opened in 2020 and located at Las Américas International Airport, in which "she has created a line of cuisine focused on the rescue of the native gastronomic heritage", according to Santo Domingo Times. In 2023 Páez opened a new restaurant at The Ocean Club hotel in Puerto Plata called Aguají, inspired by the indigenous cultures of Dominican Republic.

Parallel to her work as an entrepreneur, she has participated as a guest or judge in reality shows like MasterChef República Dominicana, MasterChef Celebrity and MasterChef Junior, among others. Páez is a member of initiatives and institutions like the Dominican Chefs Association, Slow Food, Chaines des Rotisseurs, Chefs Against Hunger and Marine Stewardship Council.

=== Activism ===
Working with the Ministry of External Relations of the Dominican Republic, Paez participated in the creation of the Gastronomic Diplomacy program, through which she has visited several countries around the world to promote the culinary culture of the island. She was also responsible for promoting the island's first Gastronomic Legislation, which recognizes Dominican gastronomy as an intangible heritage of the nation.

During the COVID-19 pandemic, Páez promoted the initiative Fogones y Gastronomía Solidaria in collaboration with the Ministry of External Relations and the Food and Agriculture Organization of the United Nations, with the aim of supplying food to health personnel and the island's poor population. Páez also founded and directs the IMA Foundation, which promotes agricultural production in local communities.

== Filmography ==
Year	Title	Role	Notes
2018	De Calle con Dafne	Guest	1 episode
2018-2019	MasterChef República Dominicana	Judge	40 episodes
2019	MasterChef Celebrity República Dominicana	Judge	10 episodes
2019-2020	MasterChef Junior República Dominicana	Judge	7 episodes
2024–present	Top Chef VIP	Judge	seasons 3-5

== Bibliography ==
- 2014 - La nueva cocina dominicana (Ediciones Crisol)
