= Picada (Colombian cuisine) =

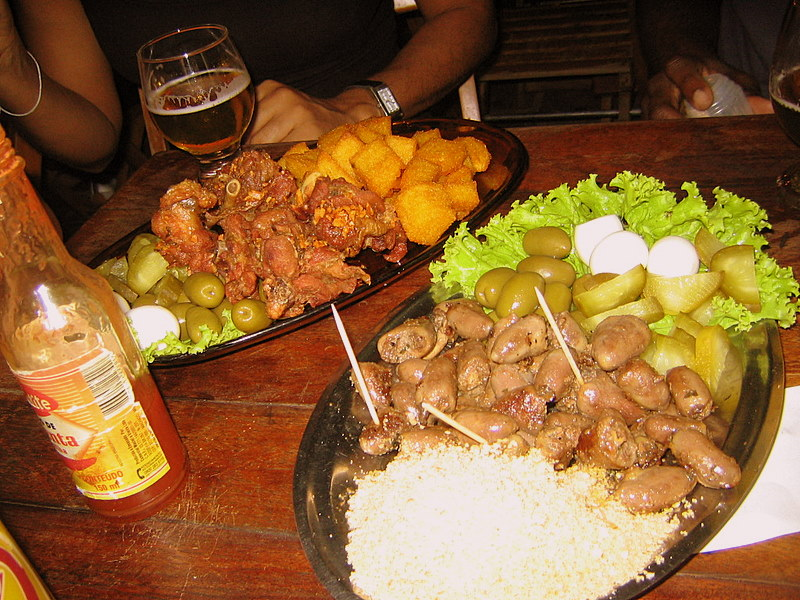
Una picada

Picada or Picada Colombiana is a Colombian cuisine dish prepared with pieces of steak, chicken, arepa, potato, yuca (cassava), morcilla, chorizo, chicharron, carne de cerdo and plantain. The ingredients are usually fried. The word picada means chopped in Spanish. Often served on large platters, picadas are usually served at gatherings and for special occasions.

Other types of Colombian picada can include chopped seafood (such as picada del mar).
