= Gabriel Teodros =

American rapper (born 1981)

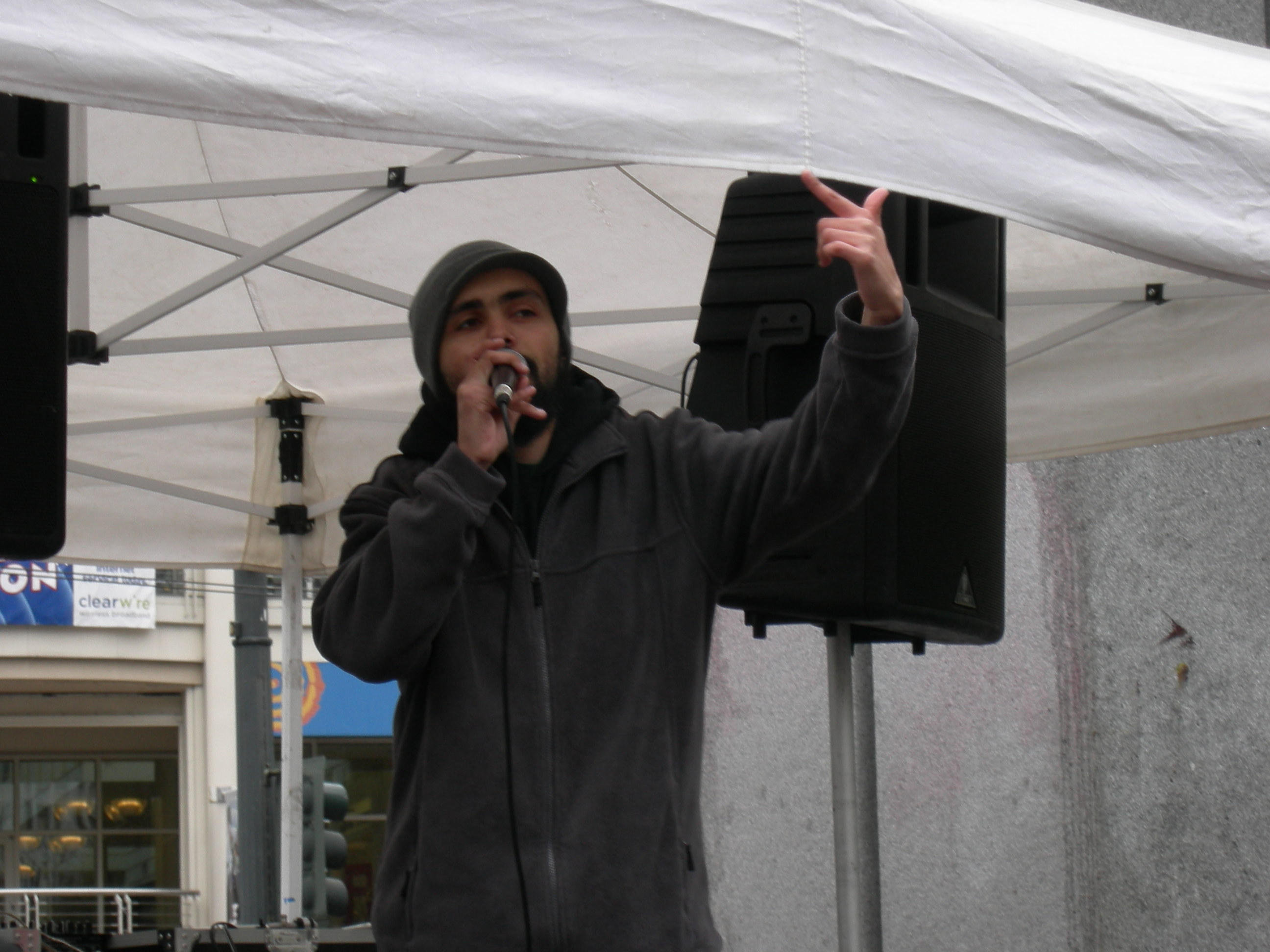

Background information
- Born: 1981 (age 44–45)
- Origin: Beacon Hill, Seattle, Washington
- Genres: Hip hop, Northwest hip hop
- Occupation: Rapper
- Years active: 1999–present
- Labels: Independent, Fresh Chopped Beats, MADK, MassLine, Porto Franco Records
- Member of: Abyssinian Creole, CopperWire
- Spouse: Ijeoma Oluo (m. 2022)
- Website: gabrielteodros.com

Gabriel Teodros (born 1981) is a hip hop artist and a member of the groups Abyssinian Creole and CopperWire. He was raised on Beacon Hill, Seattle, Washington. Teodros' music often features socially conscious themes, and he was a catalyst in the surge of dynamic underground rap acts from the Pacific Northwest during the first decade of the 2000s.

== Early life ==
Teodros was born and raised in Seattle, Washington. His parents met through anti-war organizing in the 1970s, and they split up around the time Gabriel was born. He stayed with his mother who was from Ethiopia, and met grandparents, uncles, aunts, and cousins as they first emigrated to the United States and all stayed in the same house.

Teodros's relationship with hip hop culture began at a young age within the South Seattle neighborhood of Beacon Hill. "A lot of kids in my neighborhood were affected by gang culture. And I kind of had a death wish. I felt like, at an early age, that I wasn’t going to live to 21," he said in an interview with Sheeko Magazine. He spent his high school years in Las Vegas, Nevada where as one out of approximately 30 students of color in a predominantly white school, something within him changed. "It was the first time I understood that there was a system in place that wanted kids like me to want to die. And understanding that in high school made me want to live," he said in the same interview. The former breakdancer, graffiti writer and closet-emcee finally began to take his career path seriously at age 16, using hip hop to both understand and explain his world.

== Music career ==
=== 1999–2005: Beginnings and Abyssinian Creole ===
Teodros began his musical career around 1999, when he returned to Seattle and began working with a live band called 500 Years. That same year, he met an MC named Khalil Crisis (better known as Khingz), from the group Maroon Colony. The two groups began sharing bills together all over Seattle and the two MCs also began working with a community organization called Youth Undoing Institutionalized Racism. In 2001, YUIR sent them to a conference in New Orleans, and it was there that Teodros and Khingz saw how much they had in common outside of music. They formed the group Abyssinian Creole to both represent their peoples and the bridges between them.

Also in 2001, Teodros released his first solo album, entitled Sun To A Recycled Soul.

In 2002, he was featured on the song "Liquid Sunshine", from the album Flood by Moka Only, which was his first appearance on vinyl and was recorded prior to his the release of his debut album. He later described Moka as a mentor, stating "When I was 19 years old, he kind of took me under his wing and showed me what it was like to have a home studio and how to do all this stuff independently."

In 2005, Abyssinian Creole released its debut album, Sexy Beast, a record that gives expression to the post-1990s cosmopolitanism thriving in South Seattle. The album's featured guests include Moka Only, Geologic of Blue Scholars and Macklemore. What Sexy Beast made apparent was the diversity of Northwest hiphop: It can come from anywhere (East Africa, Haiti) and be about anything (love, immigration, meditation).

=== 2006–2007: Lovework ===
In the spring of 2006, Teodros completed the entire Lovework album with producer Amos Miller, around the same time MassLine Media was being formed with Teodros, Blue Scholars and Common Market. Lovework had additional beat contributions from Sabzi of Blue Scholars, Moka Only, Kitone, and Specs One. Its sound was primarily influenced by Seattle veteran Vitamin D (who also mixed the record) and the late J Dilla. The album title, Lovework was inspired by bell hooks and her book All About Love: New Visions, where hooks insists that to truly know love, one must agree that love is a verb. She goes further to say to truly know love, one must work to undo every system of domination that stops people from truly loving. The title was also inspired by a quote from Kahlil Gibran's The Prophet: "Work is love made visible".

Also in 2006, Good Medicine was formed: a four-person group composed of Teodros, Khingz, Macklemore and Geologic of Blue Scholars. Good Medicine have headlined a handful of shows in the Seattle area but have never released any music as a group. Towards the end of that year, Teodros independently released a mix-tape/CD entitled Westlake: Class of 1999, which was a collection of his unreleased songs recorded in four different cities between 2002 and 2006.

The Lovework album was released on February 27, 2007, on MassLine, to critical acclaim. The album topped the CMJ Hip Hop charts for two weeks and came in at No. 19 for the year 2007. Teodros was also named as one of URB Magazine's "Next 100".

=== 2009–2010: Air 2 A Bird and GT's Ethiopium ===
In the fall of 2009, after being deported from the London-Heathrow Airport and having to cancel a European tour, Teodros found himself in a Brooklyn, New York recording studio with Lovework producer Amos Miller. They spent two weeks together crafting a 12 track album produced using mostly GarageBand, a piano, and the recordings of actual birds. The result was Air 2 A Bird's Crow Hill, released independently in the summer of 2010.

In December 2009, Teodros released GT's Ethiopium: A Jitter Generation Mixtape. This release shined a light on the realities of Ethiopia, touched on America's own imperfections and stressed the importance of exploring one's own intelligence and spirituality. It was made completely using instrumentals from Oh No's Ethiopium, which was made completely using old-school and rare samples of Ethiopian music.

=== 2012: Colored People's Time Machine and CopperWire ===
In January 2012, Teodros released Colored People's Time Machine, his first full-length solo album since Lovework. Colored People's Time Machine was recorded in Seattle and Brooklyn and is a multi-lingual, multi-genre album that featured vocal, instrumental, and production collaborations with 20 different artists. On it, he explored themes of love (Goodnight, a brief interlude on a long-distance relationship), cultural identity (Blossoms of Fire), personal identity (Alien Native, a biographical tale), the concept of home (Diaspora and Beit), loss (Ella Mable Bright, a tribute to his grandmother featuring Meklit Hadero), music (Colored People’s Time Machine, and Sun and Breeze, also featuring Meklit Hadero and Amos Miller), and the music industry (You A Star, on which he warns about the pitfalls of the industry and the danger of buying into the illusion of stardom). Other guests on the album include Mexico City's Bocafloja, Los Angeles emcee SKIM, and Palestinian wordsmith Sabreena Da Witch.

On April 17, 2012, CopperWire's debut album Earthbound was released on Porto Franco Records. CopperWire is a group composed of Teodros, Meklit Hadero and Burntface. All three celebrate their Ethiopian ancestry on the album, but do so through the characters of galactic fugitives aboard a hijacked starship. Earthbound's story, as described in liner notes by award-winning science fiction author Nnedi Okorafor, casts CopperWire members as characters that journey to Earth in the year 2089 to learn what it means to be human. They include mad scientist Scholar Black (Burntface), alien-human hybrid Getazia (Gabriel Teodros) and interstellar telepath Ko Ai (Meklit Hadero). The album uses metaphors of intergalactic distances to talk about diaspora and cultural connection and disconnection. The album also uses sonified light curves (that is the sound of stars, processed through Fourier analysis into frequencies that can be heard by humans) courtesy of SETI Institute researcher and NASA Kepler Labs analyst Jon Jenkins.

=== 2014: Children of the Dragon and Evidence of Things Not Seen ===
On May 7, 2014, Teodros independently released the album Children of the Dragon with Washington, DC–based producer AirMe. Teodros met AirMe in 2011 during a 24-hour layover in Washington, DC while traveling between the cities of Addis Ababa, Ethiopia and Seattle, WA. They recorded their first song together that day, before co-creating 20 more tracks together the following month. The title Children of the Dragon is a reference to mythology Teodros first heard of in Haile Gerima's film Teza.

On October 28, 2014, Teodros released the album Evidence of Things Not Seen with Auckland, New Zealand–based producer SoulChef, and featured vocals from Jonathan Emile, Shakiah and Sarah MK. The album and its title were largely inspired by James Baldwin, and it was released within a full-size book of Teodros' lyrics. City Arts Magazine described it as the best album of Teodros' career.

=== 2018: History Rhymes If It Doesn't Repeat (A Southend Healing Ritual) ===
On September 21, 2018, Teodros released his fifth solo album, History Rhymes If It Doesn't Repeat (A Southend Healing Ritual), a concept album about healing from trauma that was partially inspired by Bessel van der Kolk's book The Body Keeps the Score: Brain, Mind, and Body in the Healing of Trauma. The album's featured guests included Meklit Hadero, Khingz, Nikkita Oliver, Essam, Shakiah, Mikaela Romero, Otieno Terry and it was entirely produced by Moka Only. NPR Music featured the album in a story titled "Beyond Grunge: 15 Artists Redefining Seattle Music" where they declared "Gabriel Teodros is one of the bravest rappers currently working in Seattle."

=== 2020: What We Leave Behind ===
On June 24, 2020, in light of the COVID-19 pandemic and on the 20th anniversary of his first solo show at the Rainier Valley Cultural Center in South Seattle, Teodros released What We Leave Behind, a collection of previously unreleased tracks spanning decades in their creation, along with a few new songs recorded specifically for the release. Some of the track highlights included a Sandra Bland, Angela Davis and James Baldwin-inspired collaboration with Aisha Fukushima titled "If They Come for Me in the Morning...", a DJ B-Girl-produced meditation on the pandemic's early months titled "Listening to Bill Withers", and "Solidarity" an anthem for Black & Asian solidarity with Kimmortal and Wundrkut on production.

=== 2023–2024: From the Ashes of Our Homes and Embers ===
On September 23, 2023, Teodros released his sixth solo album From the Ashes of Our Homes. The album's themes range from a tragic fire that he and his spouse, Ijeoma Oluo, had to flee from in September 2020, to longtime friends that have died, and a shifting landscape wracked by the pandemic, wars, and the climate catastrophe. Alex Ruder at KEXP wrote "From the Ashes of Our Homes finds strength in its honest and reflective lyrics that focus on building and nurturing relationships, both at home and in the community." Ashes also marks Teodros introduction to the world as a beat producer on a majority of the tracks.

On May 31, 2024, Teodros released Embers, a collection of new songs alongside previously unreleased remixes and reimagined songs from past projects.

== Touring ==
As a part of Abyssinian Creole, Teodros performed alongside Khingz at the Under the Volcano Festival in North Vancouver, BC in 2003, 2004 and 2009.

Teodros performed at the Bumbershoot Festival in Seattle, Washington in 2006 (with Abyssinian Creole), 2007 (as a solo artist, and with Good Medicine), and in 2010 (with Air 2 A Bird).

In 2007, Teodros toured the Western part of the United States with Blue Scholars and Common Market, for the first and only MassLine Tour. Also in 2007, Teodros performed at the Sasquatch! Music Festival, which was headlined by Björk, and also featured Manu Chao and Ozomatli. Teodros also performed at the Trinity International Hip Hop Festival in Hartford, Connecticut in 2007 (as a solo artist), and in 2008 (as a part of Abyssinian Creole).

In the summer of 2009, Teodros toured in Mexico with Bocafloja, Eternia and Para La Gente.

In 2011, Teodros toured Ethiopia alongside Meklit Hadero and Burntface, where they did 12 shows including the first Hip Hop shows to ever happen in the cities of Harar and Gondar. He recorded an album in Washington, DC inspired by the experience, that was released in May 2014

Teodros has also performed in the United States alongside the likes of Lupe Fiasco, Black Star, K'naan, Zap Mama, Fishbone, KRS-One and The Coup.

== Other work ==
Teodros currently hosts a mixshow and podcast titled Worldwide Underground focused on the art and politics of storytelling across every medium.

Teodros leads writing workshops with youth, has helped spearhead after-school programs, and organizes all-ages events.

In November 2012, Teodros did a TED Talk about hip hop and science fiction, at TEDxRainier in Seattle, Washington. The Pittsburgh-based artist Alisha Wormsley cites this TED Talk as an inspiration in her afro-futurist project There Are Black People In The Future.

In 2015, Teodros wrote curriculum, taught and helped launch The Residency, a summer program focused on youth development through hip-hop, in partnership with the Museum of Pop Culture, Arts Corps, and Macklemore & Ryan Lewis.

Also in 2015, Teodros made his speculative fiction debut with a time-travel story titled "Lalibela" published in the anthology Octavia's Brood: Science Fiction Stories from Social Justice Movements (AK Press). In 2016 he graduated from the Clarion West Writers Workshop for Speculative Fiction.

From 2017 to 2023 Teodros was a DJ and Host on KEXP 90.3 FM in Seattle, WA. He started with an overnight show, and launched the show Early in the summer of 2020, which aired every weekday from 5–7 a.m., Pacific Time. Teodros also served as Associate Music Director at the station, and he had a hand in bringing in shows like Sounds of Survivance and Overnight Afrobeats to the station.

In 2023, Teodros co-taught an interdisciplinary course in the University of Washington's Honors program called "Lovework: an unfinished syllabus", named for his 2007 LP and inspired by the work of bell hooks.

== Discography ==
=== Solo albums ===
- Sun To A Recycled Soul (independent, August 16, 2001)
- Lovework (Massline, February 27, 2007)
- Colored People's Time Machine (Fresh Chopped Beats/MADK Productions, January 19, 2012)
- Children of The Dragon (produced by AirMe) (Independent, May 7, 2014)
- Evidence of Things Not Seen (produced by SoulChef) (independent, October 28, 2014)
- History Rhymes If It Doesn't Repeat (A Southend Healing Ritual) (produced by Moka Only) (independent, September 21, 2018)
- What We Leave Behind (independent, June 24, 2020)
- From the Ashes of Our Homes (independent, September 23, 2023)
- Embers (independent, May 31, 2024)

=== Collaborative albums ===
- Sexy Beast (with Khingz, as Abyssinian Creole) (MADK/Pangea, November 30, 2005)
- Crow Hill (with Amos Miller, as Air 2 A Bird) (independent, July 22, 2010)
- Earthbound (with Meklit Hadero & Burntface, as CopperWire) (Porto Franco Records, April 7, 2012)

=== EPs ===
- Sexy Beast EP (with Khingz, as Abyssinian Creole) (MADK/Pangea, 2005)
- No Label (Massline, 2007)
- The Lentil Soup EP (produced by DJ Ian Head) (Everyday Beats, May 2011)
- The Anniversary EP (independent, December 9, 2019)

=== Mixtapes ===
- Westlake: Class of 1999 (Independent, September 11, 2006)
- GT's Ethiopium: A Jitter Generation Mixtape (Independent, December 15, 2009)
- GT REMIXES Vol. 1 (Independent, December 24, 2024)

=== Non-album singles ===
- "Me & You" featuring Silver Shadow D (independent, July 28, 2009)
- "Black Love (OCnotes Remix)" with Sarah MK (independent, October 1, 2014)
- "Domestic Imperialism" with SoulChef (independent, August 25, 2016)
- "The World Is a Hidmo" (independent, August 29, 2020)
- "Nothing" with Jonathan Emile (Mindpeacelove/Tuff Gong, September 11, 2020)
- "Coffee & Sage" with Third Eye Bling (independent, October 7, 2022)
- "POW" b/w "Violent State" (People Need Water, February 3, 2026)

=== Guest appearances ===
- Moka Only – Flood – "Liquid Sunshine" featuring Gabriel T. (Underworld Inc., 2002)
- Macklemore – The Language of My World – "Claiming The City" featuring Abyssinian Creole (independent, 2005)
- Common Market – Common Market – "Every Last One (Cornerstone Remix)" featuring Geologic (of Blue Scholars) & Gabriel Teodros (MassLine, 2006)
- Nam – Exhale – "Ghetto" featuring Gabriel Teodros & Toni Hill (independent, 2008)
- The Kafa Beanz – Andromeda: The Chronicles of Blackopia Volume 1 – "Tizita" – Gabriel Teodros featuring B Sheba (Burntface Media, 2008)
- DJ Ian Head – Pieces – "Sippin Coffee" featuring Abyssinian Creole (independent, 2008)
- Khingz – From Slaveships To Spaceships – "Boi Caimen At Adwa" featuring Gabriel Teodros (Fresh Chopped Beats/MADK, 2009)
- Big World Breaks – 4 Those Lost... – "Emerald City Step" featuring Yirim Seck, Khingz, B-Flat, Gabriel Teodros, okanomodé (independent, 2009)
- The LivinYard – Summer's Here / Society Of Summer – Khingz, Nam & Gabriel Teodros (independent, 2009)
- Canary Sing – Boss Ladies: A Mixtape – "Raindrops" featuring Gabriel Teodros, Slay, Chev, One. Two (independent, 2010)
- Sabreena Da Witch – A Woman Under The Influence – "Beit / Home" featuring Gabriel Teodros (independent, 2010)
- Random Abiladeze – Indubitably! – "On My Feet" featuring Gabriel Teodros & Uptown Swuite (independent, 2011)
- Bocafloja – Patologías del Invisible Incómodo – "Agonia" featuring Gabriel Teodros & Hollis Wong-Wear (Quilomboarte, 2012)
- KA.LIL (Khingz) – Between Saturday Night & Sunday Morning – "Year 3000" featuring Gabriel Teodros (Wandering Worx, 2013)
- SoulChef – Food For Thought – "Black Love" featuring Gabriel Teodros & Sarah MK (independent, 2013)
- Hightek Lowlives – Humanoid Void – "Humanoid Void" & "Believe In Me" featuring Gabriel Teodros (Cabin Games, 2014)
- BluRum13 & Conn-Shawnery – BluConnspiracy – "Mr. Brainwash" & "Unify the Body" featuring Gabriel Teodros (independent, 2016)
- Rebel Diaz – You Mad! – "You Mad!" featuring Gabriel Teodros (independent, 2018)
- Chris Carroll – Blue – "Blue" featuring Gabriel Teodros (Raindrop Sound, 2021)
- Khingz – A Safe Place For Us – "Badtz Maru", "No Perfect Person" & "Ashes '95" featuring Gabriel Teodros (OTOW/freshcutlowers, 2023)
- Bocafloja – Después de Mañana – "Fanonian" featuring Gabriel Teodros & Aisha Fukushima (independent, 2023)
- Rell Be Free – Everything Is Everything – "Metro Joe" & "Manifesto" featuring Gabriel Teodros (People Need Water, 2026)

=== Production credits ===
- Rell Be Free – Everything Is Everything – (People Need Water, 2026)

=== Music videos ===
- 2007: "No Label (Esma Remix)"
- 2007: "Don't Cry For Us" featuring Khingz & Toni Hill
- 2008: "Third World Wide"
- 2008: "Tizita"
- 2011: "Computer Parlor"
- 2012: "Blossoms of Fire"
- 2012: CopperWire "Phone Home"
- 2012: Bocafloja "Agonia" featuring Gabriel Teodros & Hollis Wong-Wear
- 2012: "Mind Power"
- 2014: "Black Love" featuring Sarah MK
- 2014: "Light Attracts Light & Everything Else Too"
- 2015: "Greeny Jungle" featuring Shakiah
- 2016: "Domestic Imperialism"
- 2022: "Coffee & Sage" with Third Eye Bling
- 2022: "Open Letter"
- 2023: "Spacetime"
- 2023: "You & Me" featuring Aisha Fukushima & Ijeoma Oluo
