= Abyssinian Creole =

American hip hop group

- Origin: Seattle, Washington, United States
- Genres: Hip hop, Northwest hip hop
- Years active: 2001–Present
- Members: Khingz & Gabriel Teodros

Abyssinian Creole is a hip hop duo composed of Khingz and Gabriel Teodros.

== History ==
The MC's of Abyssinian Creole met each other in 1999. Khingz (who was then known as Khalil Crisis) was in a live band called Maroon Colony, and Gabriel Teodros was in a live band called 500 Years. The 2 groups began sharing bills together all over Seattle and the 2 MC's also began working with a community organization called Youth Undoing Institutionalized Racism. In 2001, YUIR sent them to a conference in New Orleans, and it was there that Teodros and Khingz saw how much they had in common outside of music. They formed the group Abyssinian Creole to both represent their peoples and the bridges between them.

DJ WD4D and producer Kitone joined the group separately years later.

In 2005 Abyssinian Creole released their first album, entitled Sexy Beast, an album that gave expression to the post-1990s cosmopolitanism thriving in South Seattle. The albums featured guests included Moka Only, Geologic of Blue Scholars and Macklemore. What Sexy Beast made apparent was the diversity of Northwest hiphop: It can come from anywhere (East Africa, Haiti) and be about anything (love, immigration, meditation).

In 2006, Good Medicine was formed: a four-person group composed of Abyssinian Creole, Macklemore and Geologic of Blue Scholars. Good Medicine have headlined a handful of shows in the Seattle area but have never released any music as a group.

Abyssinian Creole has performed at the Under the Volcano Festival in North Vancouver, BC in 2003, 2004 and 2009. They have also performed at the Bumbershoot Festival in Seattle, WA in 2006, and in 2007 (with Good Medicine). In 2008 Abyssinian Creole performed at the Trinity International Hip Hop Festival in Hartford, CT. They have also performed alongside the likes of Black Star, K'naan. Lyrics Born and The Coup.

== Discography ==
=== Albums ===
- Abyssinian Creole Sexy Beast (MADK/Pangea, 2005)

=== EPs ===
- Abyssinian Creole Sexy Beast (MADK/Pangea, 2005)

=== Guest appearances ===
- Gabriel Teodros Sun To A Recycled Soul "Gold" featuring Khingz (independent, 2001)
- Macklemore The Language of My World "Claiming The City" featuring Abyssinian Creole (independent, 2005)
- Gabriel Teodros Lovework "Don't Cry For Us" featuring Khingz & Toni Hill (MassLine, 2007)
- Khingz From Slaveships To Spaceships "Boi Caimen At Adwa" featuring Gabriel Teodros (Fresh Chopped Beats/MADK, 2009)
- Big World Breaks 4 Those Lost... "Emerald City Step" featuring Yirim Seck, Khingz, B-Flat, Gabriel Teodros, okanomodé (independent, 2009)
- The LivinYard Summer's Here / Society Of Summer - Khingz, Nam & Gabriel Teodros (independent, 2009)
- Suntonio Bandanaz Who Is Suntonio Bandanaz!?! "Meditate" featuring Abyssinian Creole (Fresh Chopped Beats/MADK, 2009)
- Gabriel Teodros Colored People's Time Machine "You A Star" featuring Khingz (Fresh Chopped Beats/MADK Productions, 2012)
