= Tobacco Road (Common Market album) =

Studio album by Common Market
- Released: September 9, 2008
- Recorded: 2007
- Studios: London Bridge Studios; Shoreline, WA
- Genre: Alternative hip hop
- Length: 60:28
- Labels: Hyena Records; Massline Media
- Producer: Sabzi

Common Market chronology
Black Patch War (2008)	Tobacco Road (2008)	The Winter's End (2009)

Professional ratings
Review scores
Source	Rating
AllMusic	favorable
Exclaim!	favorable
PopMatters	6/10 stars
RapReviews.com	6.5/10
Spin	favorable

Tobacco Road is the second studio album by Seattle-based hip-hop duo Common Market. It was released on September 9, 2008, via Hyena Records and Massline Media. The album's title is a reference to the tobacco-producing region of North Carolina.

== Production ==
The album was close to completion in September 2007, but for reasons unrevealed, the album fell apart and the duo lost 15 weeks worth of work. However, a friend of the group pulled some strings and managed to get them some studio time at London Bridge Studios in Shoreline, WA. Five days later, a second cut of the album was complete.

== Release ==
In an October 2007 interview on Seattle radio station 107.7 The End, the duo joked that it is scheduled for release "on your mom's 50th birthday." They later confirmed that it was due in early 2008. However, the duo had problems securing distribution, despite interest from several of the labels they shopped it to. Instead, they took a similar approach to the release of their self-titled debut, opting to take out a $3,500 loan to manufacture the album and distribute it through locally owned Massline Media.

In the interim, they released the Black Patch War EP. With little promotion, the EP caught many fans, friends of the band, and even RA Scion's mother by surprise. According to RA Scion, the EP was meant to represent "the essence of compromise," meaning they would continue shopping Tobacco Road around on the condition that they would release new material in May.

On June 27, 2008, music website Spin.com released an official track listing, release date, and free mp3 download of the title track.

== Track listing ==
No.	Title	Length
1.	"Service"	1:25
2.	"Trouble Is"	3:21
3.	"Gol'Dust"	3:43
4.	"Slow Cure"	4:07
5.	"Back Home (The Return)"	3:03
6.	"40 Furrows"	1:57
7.	"House"	3:40
8.	"Winter Takes All"	3:19
9.	"Weather Vane"	5:20
10.	"40 Acres"	2:37
11.	"Spits"	2:05
12.	"Nina Sing" (featuring Funklove)	3:09
13.	"Certitude" (featuring Chev)	2:51
14.	"Crucible" (featuring Geologic)	2:51
15.	"40 Thieves"	3:08
16.	"Nothin' at All"	5:28
17.	"Swell"	3:48
18.	"Tobacco Road"	4:36

== Personnel ==
- Sabzi – producer
- RA Scion – vocals
- Vitamin D – mixing

== Charts ==
Chart	Peak position
US Heatseekers Albums (Billboard)	50
