= Common Market (album) =

Studio album by Common Market
- Released: February 13, 2005; Re-released October 17, 2006
- Recorded: 2005
- Genre: Hip hop, alternative hip hop, northwest hip hop
- Length: 53:28
- Label: Massline Media
- Producer: Sabzi

Common Market chronology
Common Market (2005)	Black Patch War EP (2008)

Alternate album covers
- Original Cover

Professional ratings
Review scores
Source	Rating
AllMusic	3.5/5 stars
RapReviews	9/10

Common Market is the self-titled debut album from Seattle-based hip-hop duo Common Market consisting of rapper RA Scion and DJ/producer Sabzi. The album was fully produced by Sabzi, who is also a member of another Seattle hip-hop group, Blue Scholars.

== Release ==
The album was initially released February 13, 2005 independently. Following the well received local response, the album caught the attention of KRS-One, who would expose Common Market to a wider audience when KRS-One brought them on the Temple of Hip-hop tour. One year later, the album was re-released October 17 on Massline Media. The re-release adds one bonus track and revised cover art. The bonus track on the re-released version of the album is a remixed version of a Blue Scholars song from their 2005 The Long March EP. It features Geologic and Gabriel Teodros.

== Influences ==
"G'Dang Diggy" is a reference to the New York Rap Battle involving KRS-One of Boogie Down Productions.

== Track listing ==
No.	Title	Length
1.	"Re-Fresh"	3:43
2.	"Push"	3:23
3.	"G'Dang Diggy"	4:15
4.	"Connect For"	3:17
5.	"Crossbow"	3:29
6.	"Every Last One"	2:41
7.	"Poison"	4:13
8.	"Trinity"	4:46
9.	"Kampo"	1:57
10.	"Love One"	3:24
11.	"Succor MC's"	2:45
12.	"My Pathology"	3:13
13.	"Keep Track"	3:19
14.	"Doors"	4:57

2006 Re-release
No.	Title	Length
15.	"Every Last One (Cornerstone Remix)" (featuring Geologic & Gabriel Teodros)	4:06
