= Píib =

Earth oven from the Yucatán peninsula

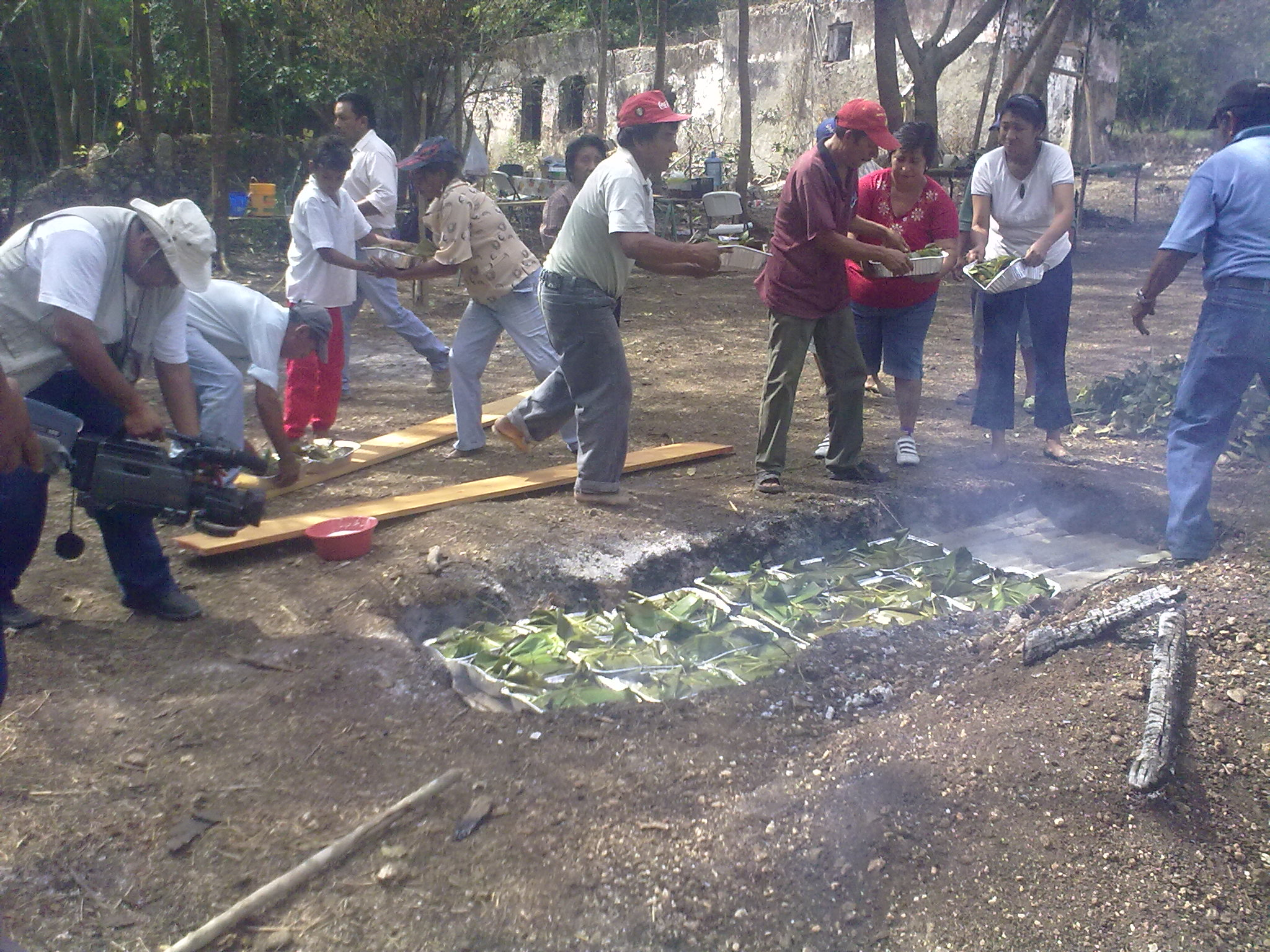
Burying the pibipollos, in Campeche.

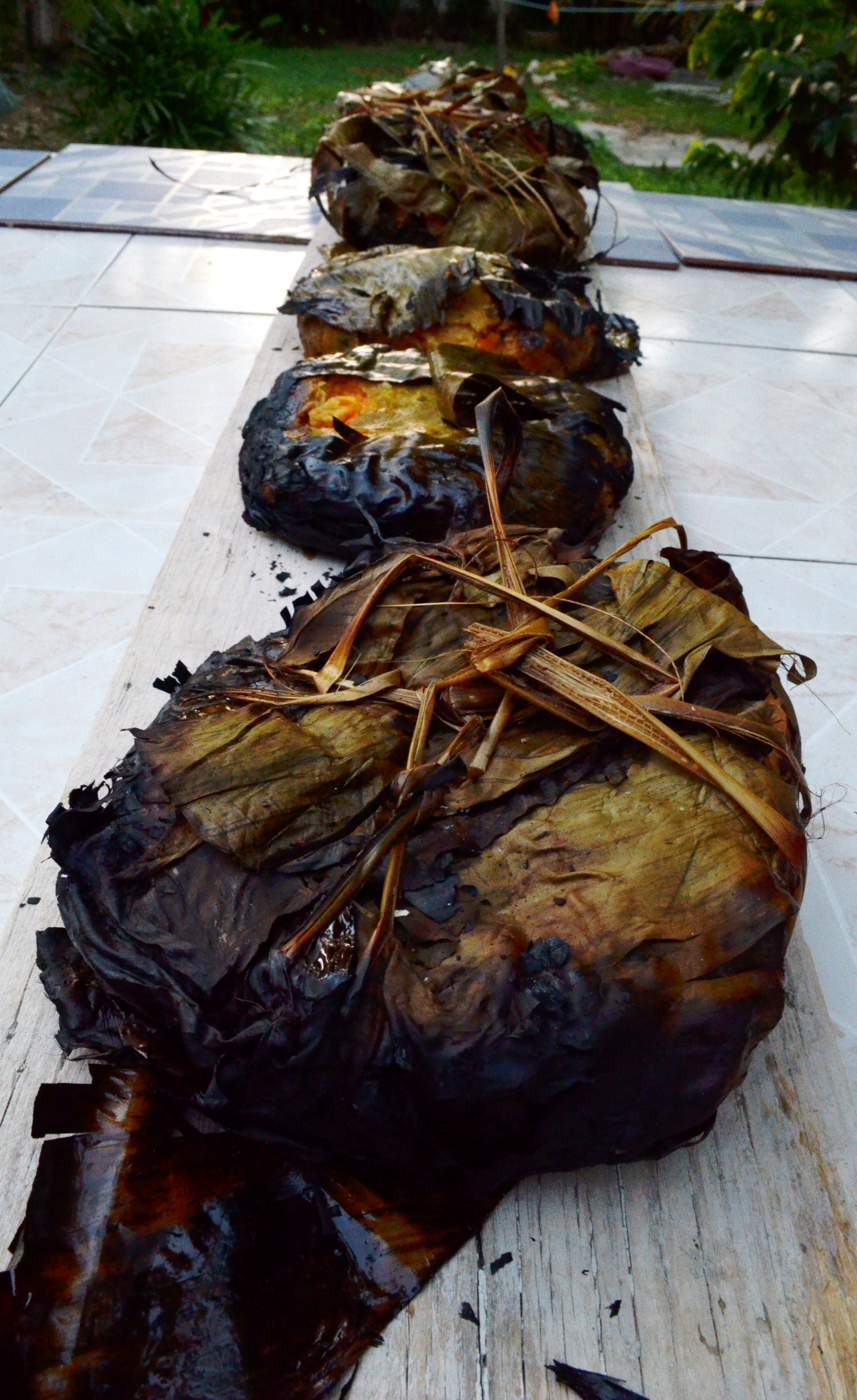
Chachak waaj (pibil tamale) fresh out of the piib for Hanal Pixan (Mayan Day of the Dead)

Pib (in Spanish) or píib (in Yucatec Maya, pronounced [píːɓ] or [píːʔ]), is a typical earth oven of the Yucatán peninsula, in Mexico. This technique probably has a pre-Hispanic origin. It consists of digging a hole, lighting a stove with firewood and stones, and cooking the food (traditionally pork or chicken) over low heat, all covered with more soil. Today, many people in Mexico believe that "pib" refers to tamales cooked in the earth oven (called chachak waaj in Mayan) and not to the oven itself. This confusion is quite widespread.

A piib oven can feed up to forty people, so it is typical to prepare it during local festivities. For example, in Kantunilkín, the municipal seat of Lázaro Cárdenas, the piib is prepared for December 8, the day of the Immaculate Conception, the patron saint of the town. Relleno negro is also made for Hanal Pixan, as well as torteado or vaporcito tamales.

== Etymology ==
In Yucatán it is mostly known as pib, or píib according to the current Mayan spelling promoted by the Academy of the Mayan Language. In some contexts also pii'. The plural is formed as píibo'ob, not "pibs", and the verb is formed as píib (translatable as 'to make a piib').

Food cooked in a piib is called pibil. It is mistakenly thought that "pibil" means that they include recado. The suffix -bil indicates participle: pib-bil ('[thing] roasted'), muk-bil ('[thing] buried'), etc. In the Mayan language, it is placed before the name of the food, while in Spanish it is the other way around, for example: the famous cochinita pibil, Mayans call it piibi'k'éek'en.

== History ==
The piib is not explicitly explained in any pre-Hispanic codex, however, experts have come to the conclusion that it is a technique that has already been practiced before colonization. The reasons are various; On the one hand, the earth oven has never been part of the Hispanic tradition, so it could not be brought by the conquerors. On the other hand, the practice of the earth oven extends to other Mesoamerican indigenous peoples.

Other forms of earth ovens are also found in the rest of Mexico, such as the ximbó of Hidalgo, of Otomee origin, or the classic Mexican barbecue. However, nowhere are they as common as in the Yucatán. Earth ovens are practiced by both indigenous and mestizo people. Peasants in Mexico roast the whole lamb, typically on Sundays and holidays.

A 2012 study carried out in Xocén, led by researcher Carmen Salazar from UADY, revealed that traditional piib'ob are prepared with native animals and plants, which suggests a continuity of piib practice dating back to pre-Columbian times. At that time, the earth oven may have been a preservation method, rather than cooking, especially in hunts, which could last several days. Furthermore, the study shows the close relationship between the piib and the kool (Mayan milpa), and that both could have the same age (approximately 3400-3000 BCE). Another indication is in the discovery of bones of animals from a very old time that do not show cutting and fleshing features but do show heat marks, which is consistent with cooking in pib.

In the Palenque site, Chiapas, the word pib can be read written in various hieroglyphs, although not to refer particularly to the oven, but with a related meaning. For example, one of the temples reads: u-pibnahil ("steam bath temple"). Pib'naah means "steam bath".

The oldest written record of "pib" is found in the Calepino Maya de Motul (16th century), a dictionary of Mayan terms that defines it as "bath or temazcal in which the women in labor or recently given birth were purified, and the stove in which pumpkins, meats, etc. were roasted under the ground" (noun), and also as "roasted meat, squash, etc. under ground." (verb). In another book of the time, Bocabulario Maya Than, defines it in a similar way.

More currently, one of the main anthropo-culinary studies on contemporary piib was in 2019, led by chef Wilson Alonzo, a researcher on the traditional cuisine of the Mayan ethnic group. This study was carried out in twelve municipalities in Yucatán.

== Technique ==
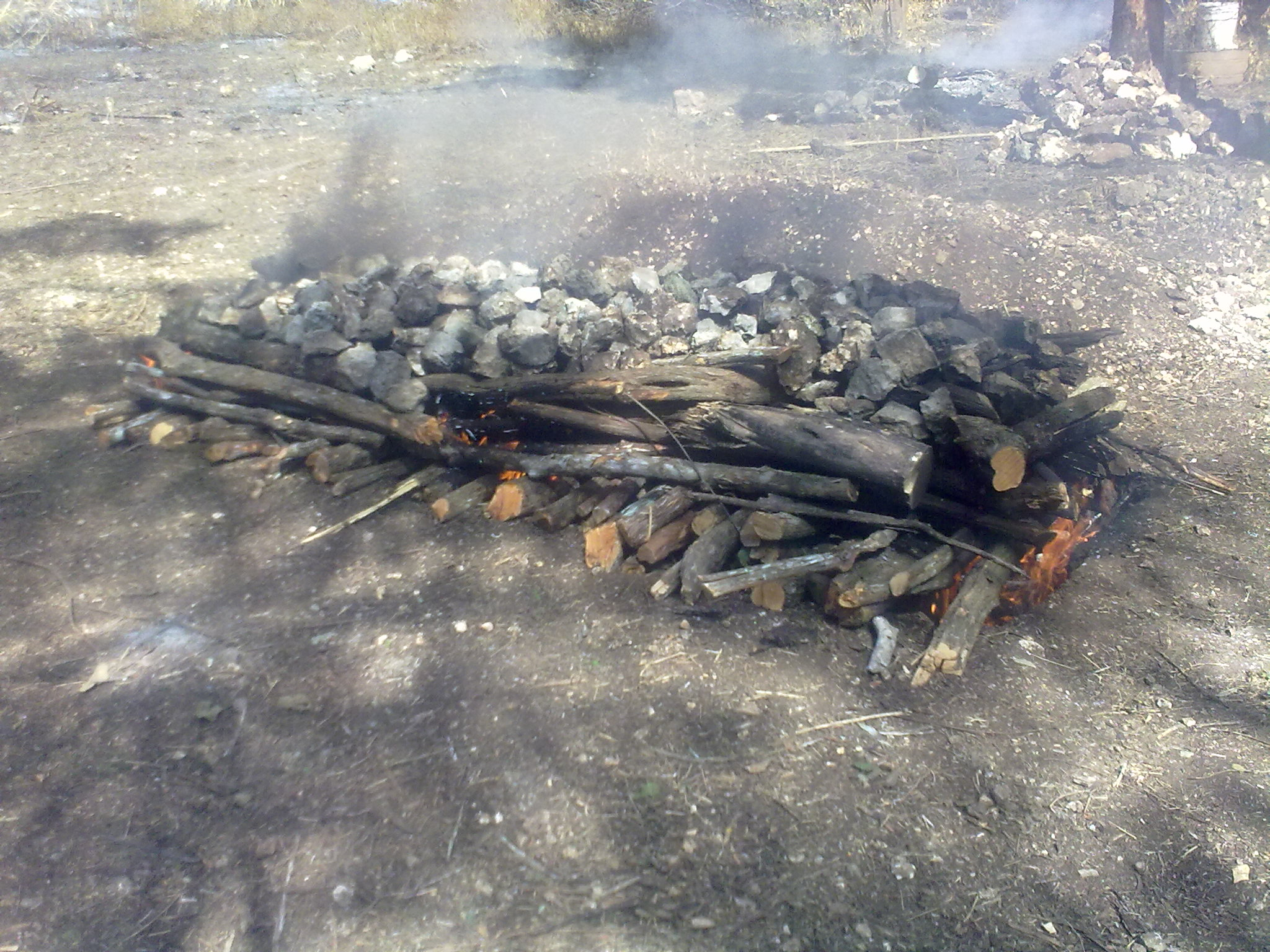
Preparation of piib.

=== Size and shape ===
The size of the hole depends on the amount of food. In addition, the technique of preparing a piib varies from region to region. In the west of the peninsula (Maxcanú, Hopelchén, ...) the ovens have a square shape, approximately 1 m (3 ft) per side. In the east (Valladolid, Tizimín, ...), as well as in the south (Peto, Tekax, ...), rectangular and elongated holes are dug. This is due to the fact that in it, several large pots are arranged in a row, which can be up to a dozen. On the north coast it is possible to find circular ovens. According to the locals, this is due to the strong coastal wind. The depth of the piib varies markedly between a few centimeters (inches) to approximately 1 m (3 ft).

=== Preparation ===
The piib is prepared from the day before, digging a hole in red earth (K'an kab in Mayan). In coastal areas such as the port of Progreso, the hole is dug in beach sand. Ways to prepare also vary from region to region. In some places, dry palm leaves (zohol) or newspaper sheets are placed underneath so that the firewood ignites faster. In the west area, the wood is placed under the stones, while in the East, the stones go below and the wood above. Wood and stones are arranged in a kind of pyramid.

The stones must be of medium size, and it is essential that they be solid (si'in túun), since they retain heat better. It is checked whether a stone is solid if they sound hollow when they collide with each other (like river stones). Limestone rocks are useless since they crumble easily. The larger stones are reserved for prolonged cooking.

As for firewood (si'), the most typical trees are catzín (box kaatsim), kitinché (kitam che'), chaká (chakaj), jabín (ja'abin) or chukum, which are hard woods to generate a lasting combustion. Aromatic woods such as oak may be also used. In the case of cooking that lasts for several hours, both dry and green wood (freshly cut) are added, so that the charcoal remains hot for longer. It is lit and allowed to consume all the wood until it becomes charcoal.

=== Cooking ===
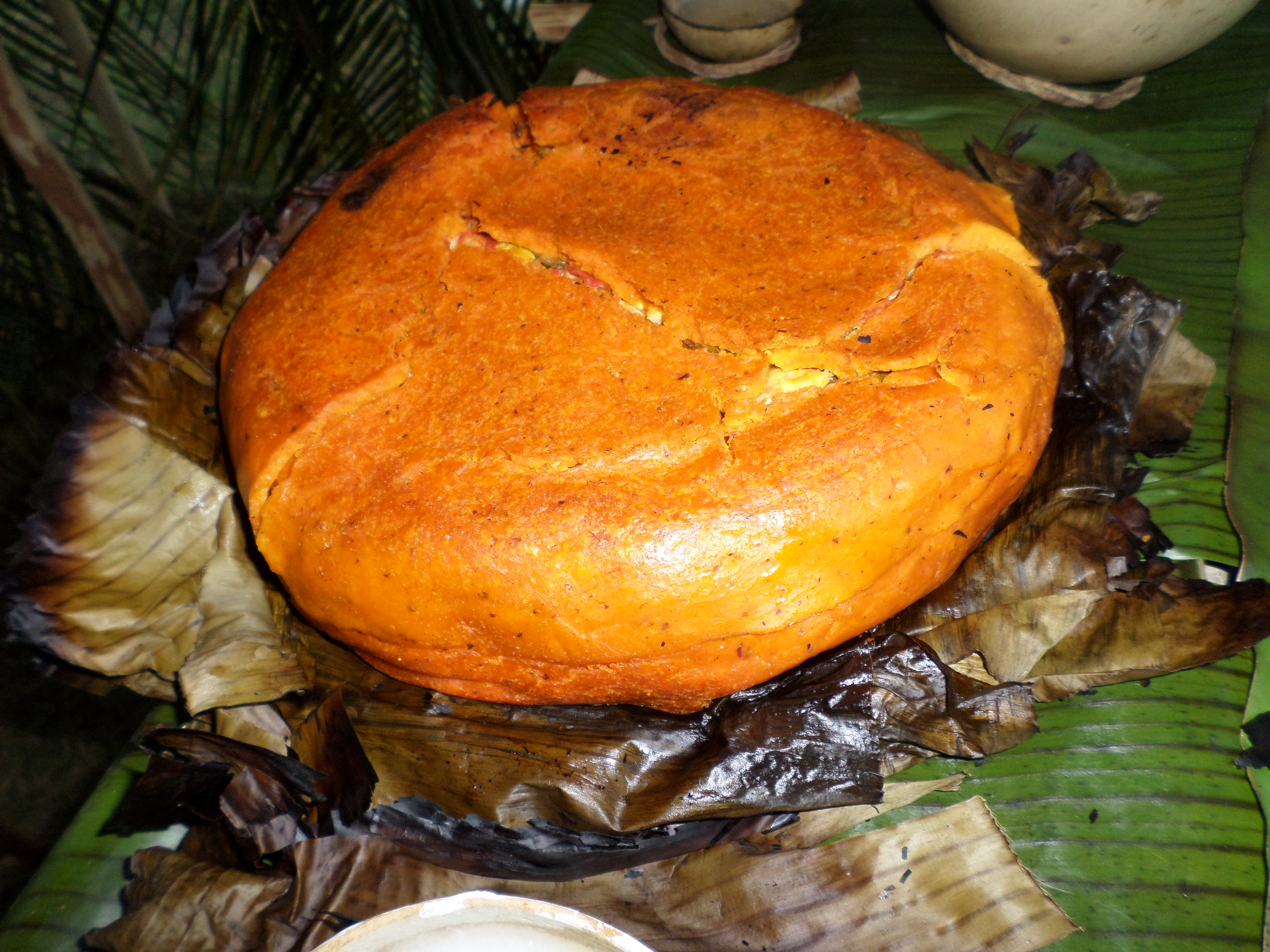
Pibil waaj.

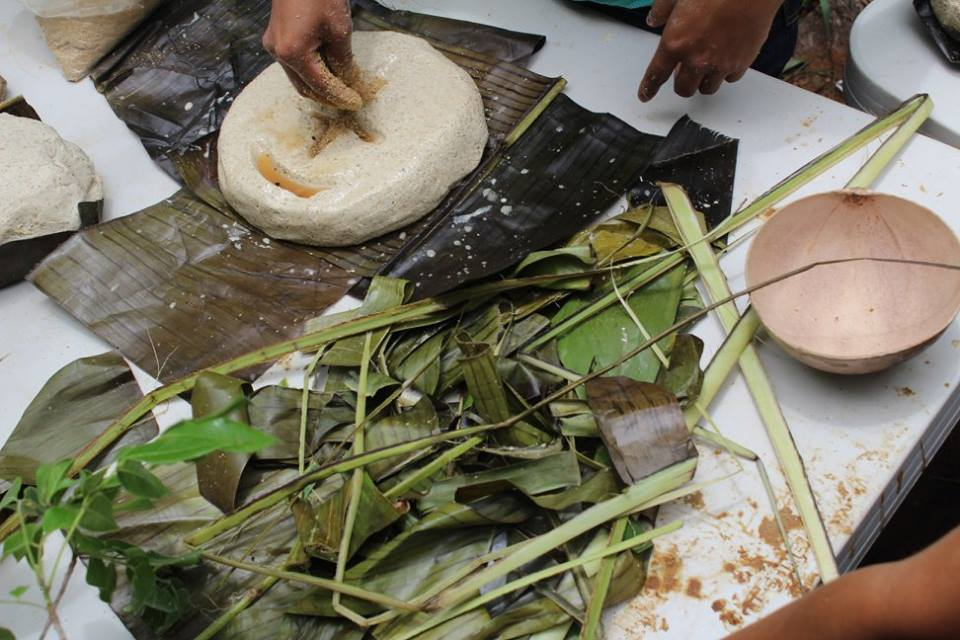
Noj waaj.

Cooking times also vary greatly; a chicken pibil may need an hour and a half, while a cochinita pibil takes up to 16h. It is a tradition to roast whole animals on the pitch. Some, like the cochinita, are placed wrapped in a banana leaf, in a refractory or pot. Dry foods are placed directly on the stone, if they are stews, the pots are placed on the stones. Certain dishes are often cooked in the piib are:

- Piibi'k'éek'en (Mayan), cochinita pibil (Spanish)
- Pibipollo, mukbil pollo or pollo pibil (M. and S.)
- Relleno negro pibil (S.)
- Piibinaal (M.), pibinales or elote pibil (S.), corn
- Píibil k'úum (M.), calabaza pibil (S.), pumpkin
- Píibilwaaj (M.), tamal pibil (S.), tamale of masa
- Píibil yuuk (M.), yuk pibil (S.), brocket deer
- Píibilwech (M.) huech pibil (S.), armadillo

The tamales (waaj) that are cooked in the piib are various: chachak waaj, piibil waaj, k'axbil waaj, mukbil waaj, to'obil waaj or noj waaj. They are mistakenly called pib.

The piib is covered again with earth but not before putting a layer of wild leaves (le') to keep the steam. They serve many different types of leaves: jabín, pixoy, palma de huano, etc. The banana peel is also used as a lid; In contrast, the banana leaf is not good to cover because its wax or resin is flammable. When covered with aromatic leaves, new flavors are added to the food. The amount of le' will also depend on the season of the year: in the rainy season, more firewood will be put but less cover, and in the dry season, it will be the other way around; the more leaf, the more steam. On rainy days it is imperative to prepare the oven from the day before, to dry the ground.

== Associated rites ==
During Hanal Pixan or Janal Pixán (Day of the Dead), the food of the piib is offered to the souls of the beloved ones. At the end of the holidays, the hole is no longer used. First, the hole is cleaned. On it, a cross made of banana leaves and sacred sipiche leaves is placed, and then it is blessed with water. The ritual ends by closing the hole and praying a meal.

According to tradition, not everyone can cook a piib; the sis-k'aab ('cold hands') are those people who cannot even get close, since when they try to help, the pib is spoiled. People who cook the piib are called j-piib (if it is a man), or x-piib (if it is a woman).

== See also ==
- Curanto, Mapudungun earth oven
- Pachamanca, Andean earth oven
- Ximbó, Ñähñú earth oven
