= Black Patch War (EP) =

EP by Common Market
- Released: May 20, 2008
- Recorded: 2008
- Genre: Hip-hop
- Length: 22:05
- Label: Massline Media
- Producer: Sabzi

Common Market chronology
| Common Market (2006) | Black Patch War (2008) | Tobacco Road (2008) |

Black Patch War is an EP from American hip-hop duo, Common Market. It is the group's second release. The title is a reference to the American Black Patch Tobacco Wars of the early 20th century, a continuation of the title of the group's forthcoming full-length album, Tobacco Road which takes its name from the tobacco-producing region of North Carolina.

According to lyricist RA Scion, the EP "represents the essence of compromise." After having much difficulty securing distribution for Tobacco Road, the duo opted to hold on to the album on the condition that they would release new material in May 2008.

With little promotion and the initial expectation of an early-2008 release for Tobacco Road, the EP caught many fans, friends of the band, and even RA Scion's mother by surprise.

In a series of posts on his blog, "six minutes to sunrise," RA Scion posted the lyrics to the songs and detailed the references in the lyrics. The specific song posts are referenced in the track listing below.

== Track listing ==
1. "Black Patch War" (3:16)
2. "Oldham Era" (2:19)
3. "Watership Down" (3:14)
4. "Red Leaves" (4:11)
5. "His Eminence" (2:41)
6. "Trouble Is" (3:19)
7. "Bonanza" (3:02)

== Credits ==
- Sabzi - beats, producer
- RA Scion - rhymes
