= Cochinita pibil =

Mexican slow-roasted pork dish

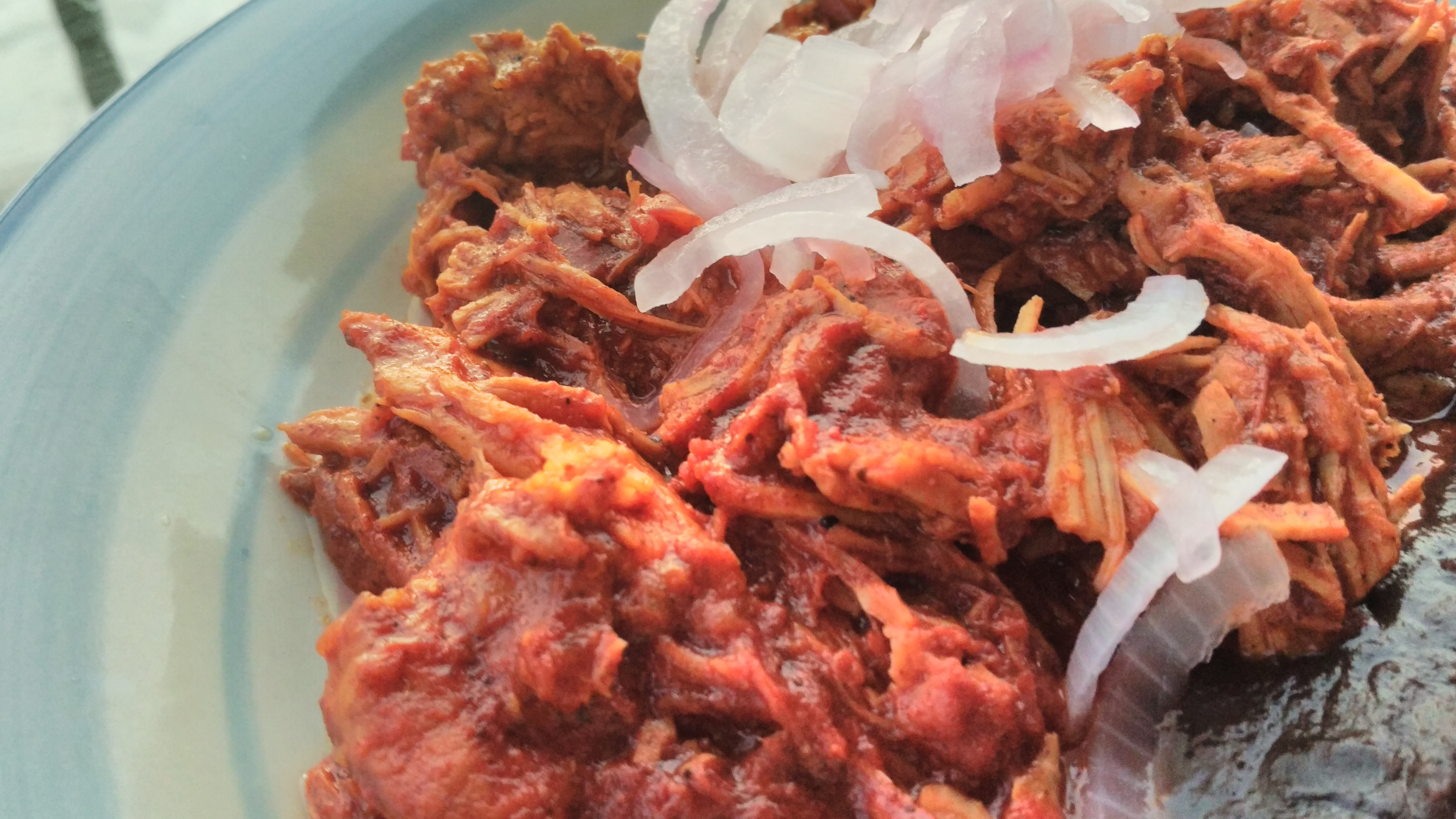
Puerco pibil

Cochinita pibil (also puerco pibil or cochinita con achiote) is a traditional Yucatec Mayan slow-roasted pork dish from the Yucatán Peninsula of Mexico. Preparation of traditional cochinita involves marinating the meat in strongly acidic citrus juice, adding annatto seed, which imparts a vivid burnt orange color, and roasting the meat in a píib while it is wrapped in banana leaf.

== Methods ==
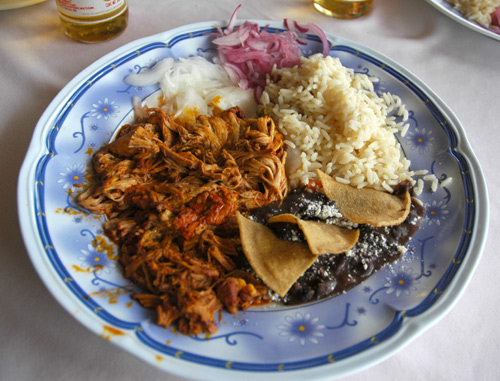
Cochinita

Cochinita means baby pig, so true cochinita pibil involves roasting a whole suckling pig. Alternatively, pork shoulder (butt roast) or pork loin are used in many recipes. The high acid content of the marinade and the slow cooking time tenderize the meat, allowing otherwise tough pieces of meat to be used. The Yucatecan recipes always employ the juice of Seville or bitter oranges for marinating. In areas where bitter oranges are not common, the juice of sweet oranges combined with lemons, limes, or vinegar is employed to approximate the effect of the bitter orange on the meat. Another important ingredient in all Pibil recipes is achiote (annatto), which gives the dish its characteristic color and adds flavour. It is usually eaten with side dishes such as yellow corn tortillas, red pickled onions, refried black beans, and habanero chilies. Traditionally, cochinita pibil is buried in a pit with a fire at the bottom to roast it.

== In popular culture ==
Cochinita pibil is a recurring element of the movie Once Upon a Time in Mexico, in which it is the favorite food of a CIA agent played by Johnny Depp.

Cochinita pibil appears as "Xibruq pibil" in the video game Final Fantasy XIV: Dawntrail in which it plays a vital role in the trials for the selection of the new Dawnservant.

== See also ==
- Barbacoa
- Birria
- Carnitas
- Pulled pork
- Lechón asado
- List of Mexican dishes
- List of pork dishes
- Pozole
