= Common Market (hip-hop group) =

American hip hop group

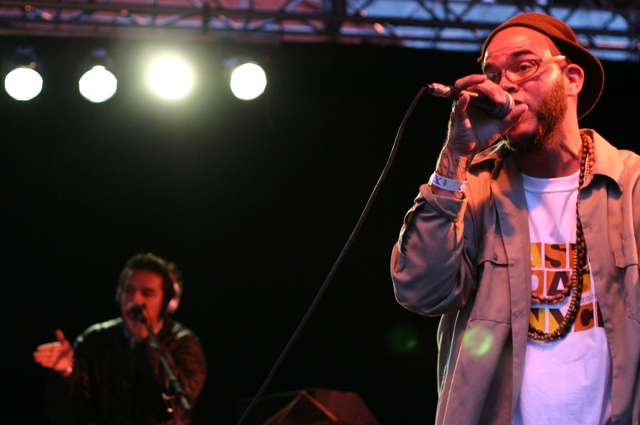
- Common Market performs at the Capitol Hill Block Party in Seattle, July 2006.

Background information
- Origin: Seattle, Washington, U.S.
- Genres: Hip-hop, Northwest hip-hop
- Years active: 2005–2009; 2019-present
- Label: Massline Media
- Members: RA Scion; Sabzi

Common Market is an American hip-hop duo based in Seattle, Washington, active from 2005 through 2009 and from 2019 to present. Both members, DJ/Producer Sabzi (Saba Mohajerjasbi) and MC RA Scion (Ryan Abeo), had been active hip-hop artists in the Pacific Northwest for three years before they combined their talents in 2005 to form Common Market. Together they have released two albums, three EPs, and have gone on several tours.

== Early beginnings ==
Sabzi started his career as DJ and producer in another hip-hop duo, Blue Scholars, in Seattle, Washington. RA Scion gained musical skill while in Louisville, Kentucky, before moving to Seattle. RA Scion and Sabzi's paths crossed through the Northwest hip-hop scene, where they bonded over their Baháʼí Faith contacts, and their political and spiritual approach to hip-hop music.

== Musical career ==
=== 2005-2007: Common Market, self titled LP and touring ===
After collaborating on a pair of tracks on RA Scion's 2004 solo project, Live and Learn, the duo began working in an attic-based studio for what would eventually become the 14-track self-titled debut, released in October 2005. An advance copy caught the ear of KRS-One, who praised the album and RA Scion for "spitting in the tradition of the conscious hiphop movement." KRS-One then drove up to perform at Common Market's album release party in Seattle, then taking the duo on the road with him on the Temple of Hiphop tour.

The album was hailed by fans as a remarkable improvement over any of their previous works. Common Market takes on questions about religion, politics and the state of mainstream hip-hop. At the core of Common Market's music is a critical, unapologetic world view that change is not only necessary, it is inevitable, and can only come about through having love for and serving the people.

Shortly after the release of their debut album, Common Market gathered praise as Seattle Weekly's 2006 Best New Artist and performing slots on grand stages such as the Sasquatch Festival and The Capitol Hill Block Party. They have shared the stage with KRS-One, Zion I, Ghostface Killah, The Coup, Guru of Gang Starr, and the Blue Scholars. The album's regional success, along with the wave of Northwest hip-hop, poised the group for a serious push into the national scene, and the Common Market LP has been mixed and mastered by Seattle music engineer Martin Feveyear and repackaged with new album cover art. Their debut album was also the first official new release of Mass Line, a co-op indie record label run by Common Market, Blue Scholars and Gabriel Teodros. The now-defunct label's mission statement included the goal of using hip-hop as a means of grassroots community organizing and youth outreach.

=== 2007-2009: Tobacco Road ===
In a 2007 interview on Seattle radio station 107.7 The End, the duo stated that their new album would be titled Tobacco Road and is scheduled for release "on your mom's 50th birthday." In preparation for the album release, Common Market released the EP Black Patch War on May 20, 2008. Tobacco Road was released September 9, 2008, followed by a CD release party on September 11, 2008, at Neumo's in Seattle. Later that month, the album climbed to #50 on the U.S. Billboard Heatseekers chart. In September 2008, Common Market released a music video for the single "Trouble Is." The video was shot by director Zia Mohajerjasbi and was filmed at sites around Monroe, Washington. Common Market were winners in the eighth annual Independent Music Award for Rap/Hip-Hop Album in 2009 for Tobacco Road. A second (and final) EP, The Winter's End, followed in March 2009.

== Hiatus ==
In 2009, RA Scion announced that The Winter's End would be the final release by the group via bandcamp, with both artists going their separate artistic ways.

== Reunion ==
On July 12, 2019, Common Market played again live at West Seattle Summer Fest after a ten-year hiatus. That week they also released a new EP titled Triple Crown. The group has also announced a forthcoming album, titled Pegasus Parade, which will be released in 2020.

== Name ==
RA Scion cites the name's origin from Common's song Communism from his 1994 album Resurrection.

== Discography ==
=== Albums ===
- Common Market (Pacific Northwest release: SCIONtific, October 24, 2005; National release: Massline, October 17, 2006)
- Tobacco Road (Massline/Hyena, September 9, 2008)

=== EPs ===
- Black Patch War (Massline, May 13, 2008)
- The Winter's End (Massline/Hyena, March 24, 2009)
- Triple Crown (Self Released, July 19, 2019)

=== Singles ===
- Connect For (Massline, Jul 2006)

=== Non-album tracks ===
- Spread (Jul 2007)
- Tobacco and Snow Covered Roads (Jan 2009; web video release)

== Videography ==
- 2008: "Trouble Is"
- 2009: "Tobacco and Snow Covered Roads"
- 2009: "Escaping Arkham"
