= Bocafloja =

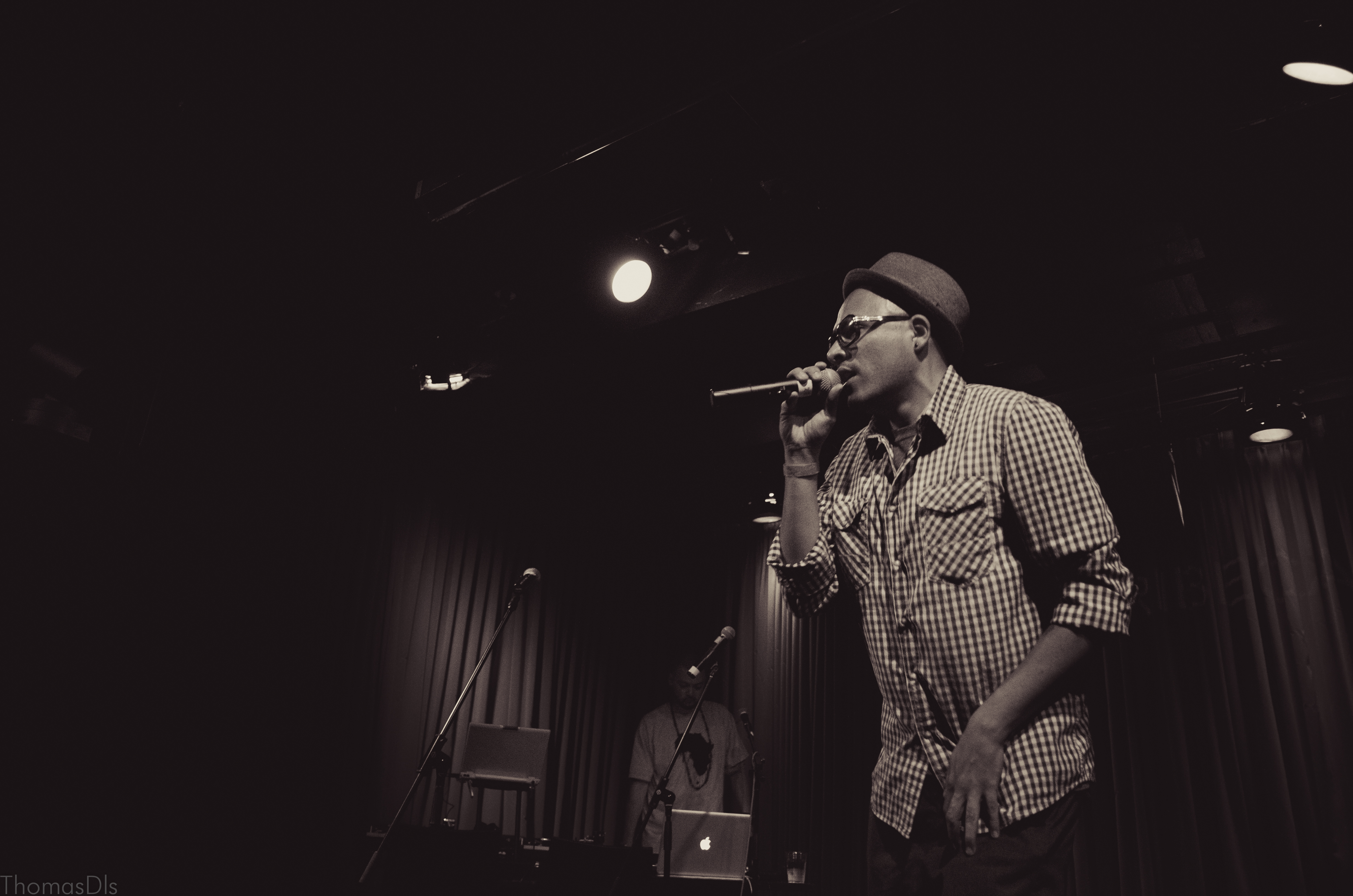
- Bocafloja performing in New York City, 2012

Background information
- Born: Aldo Villegas; July 12, 1978 (age 48)
- Origin: Mexico City, Mexico
- Genres: Hip hop, spoken word, world
- Occupations: Rapper, spoken word artist, poet, lecturer
- Years active: 1995 – present
- Label: Quilomboarte
- Website: Official website

Aldo Villegas (born 12 July 1978), better known by his stage name Bocafloja, is a rapper, poet, spoken word artist, and outspoken social communicator from Mexico City, Mexico. Bocafloja began his musical career in the mid-1990s with the groups Lifestyle (1996–1998) and Microphonk (1999). As a solo artist since 2000, he released his demo EP album Lengua Insurrecta in 2002. Bocafloja burst on the Mexican hip hop scene with the release of his debut album, Pienso Luego Existo, in 2003. Followed by the successes of Jazzyturno in 2004, A Titulo Personal in 2005, El Manual de la Otredad in 2007, and Existo: Matriz Preludio al Pienso in 2009, Bocafloja has transgressed into one of the most revered icons in the hip hop scene in Mexico. Lyrically Bocafloja critically addresses topics such as institutionalized racism, social and political oppression, mental slavery, colonialism, and other human conditions. Bocafloja's most recent album Patologías del Invisible Incómodo, released in 2012, is a concept album which narrates the experience of the body of the oppressed as a vehicle of transgression to hegemonic structures. Bocafloja is projected to release by 2014, a music video for each of the album's 16 tracks.

Bocafloja is recognized in Mexico as the pioneer of the utilization of hip hop culture as an alternative tool to create awareness, developing a different form for political participation that reaches and is more relevant to marginalized youth. Bocafloja lives in New York City.

== Biography ==
=== Early days (1995–1999) ===
Bocafloja, like many other young people in Mexico, was first exposed to hip hop thanks to immigration patterns between the United States and Mexico. Bocafloja was drawn to rap music from a young age even without fully understanding hip hop culture. His initial musical influences were completely varied, referencing hip hop artists from the United States, given at the time Spanish language rappers were limited if not non-existent. In 1993 groups of young people who were fans of hip hop in Mexico City began to come together at small house parties. The number of youth that were associated with the hip hop scene during the early 1990s was relatively small, most of them knowing each other personally.

In 1995 Bocafloja began to write his own rhymes but did not start recording until 1996. His first tracks were recorded in rudimentary home studios. Bocafloja's early rhymes reflected his adolescence and state of maturity, mimicking the excesses of commercialism: money, women, etc. It was not until years later as Bocafloja passed through a process of political awareness, in 1999, when the content of his lyrics dramatically changed as a natural product of personal transformation.

=== Professional career (2000–present) ===
In 2002 Bocalfoja released his demo EP album Lengua Insurrecta. The album, which established Bocafloja as a solo artist, represented a radical departure from his previous musical projects in his initial career with its politically infused lyrics. The LP contains 6 songs and was distributed by hand and gained underground popularity by word of mouth.

2003 marked the release of Pienso Luego Existo whose subject matter struck cords among his peers and established Bocafloja with respect and following within the burgeoning hip hop community in Mexico City and beyond. With many of the tracks the artist recounts his experiences of life in the second largest metropolis in the world and critiques the political and religious systems within the country. The album spawned several hit singles which became instant classics, "Chillatown", "Los Diez Mandamientos", "Avasallando" and "Pasado, Presente, y Futuro". Bocafloja utilized the production of ED One and collaborated with fellow MC's JR (now known as Akil Ammar), SPIA, Epik and NedMan.

In 2004, Bocafloja released Jazzyturno. A departure from his previous album with jazz-infused beats. Noteworthy singles include "El Día de mi Suerte" which samples Hector Lavoe's song of the same title, "Mi Gente", "Mujer Ser" and "Sector Lucido". The album features collaborations with Akil Ammar, Miguel Contreras, Skool 77, and Ximbo. Tracks are produced by Skool 77, Ed-One, Matheus Pinguim, Mother Tongue Productions, Nemezyz Beats, Nugit Productions, and Ximbo.

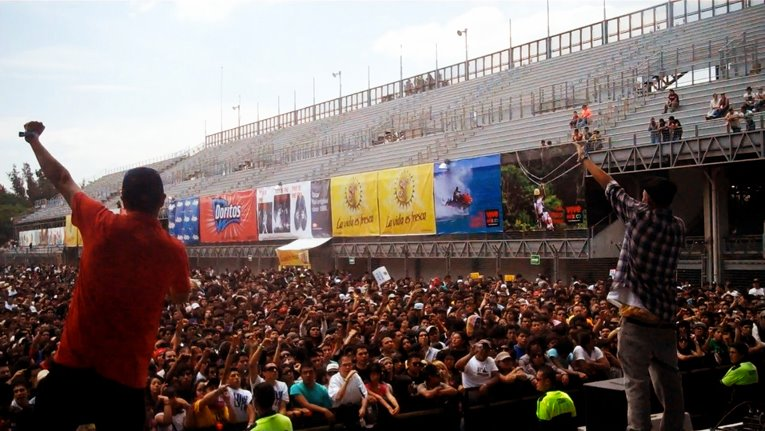
Bocafloja Performance, Vive Latino, Mexico, 2010

In 2005 Bocafloja released A Titulo Personal. The album, produced in grand part by Soulman, contains tracks with a soulful feel. The album contains the hit single "Tiempo", which has proven to be Bocafloja's most famous single. The video "Tiempo" gained popularity with frequent media rotation on various cable and network channels in Mexico. A Titulo Personal features collaborations with Menuda Coincidencia, Nico Royale (Italy), and Denisse of the group Anastasias (Brazil). The album's success gave way for Bocafloja's to win the DJ & Clubbing Awards' Hip Hop Artist of the Year Award 2006 in Mexico.

El Manual de la Otredad, the artist's fourth full-length album, was released in 2007. In this album Bocafloja experiments with a new sound, utilizing stylized mainstream hip hop beats. It was the artist's intent to juxtapose fiercely politically charged lyrics with beats that the hip hop community would deem "commercial." The album's singles included "Autónomo" and "Soulrebel" and contains collaborations with Malena Actitud Maria Marta (Argentina), Moyenei (Chile), Tek-One (Puerto Rico), and SieteNueve (Puerto Rico). For the album El Manual de la Otredad Bocafloja was awarded Hip Hop Album of the Year 2008 by the Indie-O Awards in Mexico. The album has also been the subject of several academic studies and research projects in the United States and Latin America for its poetic contribution and connection with political processes.

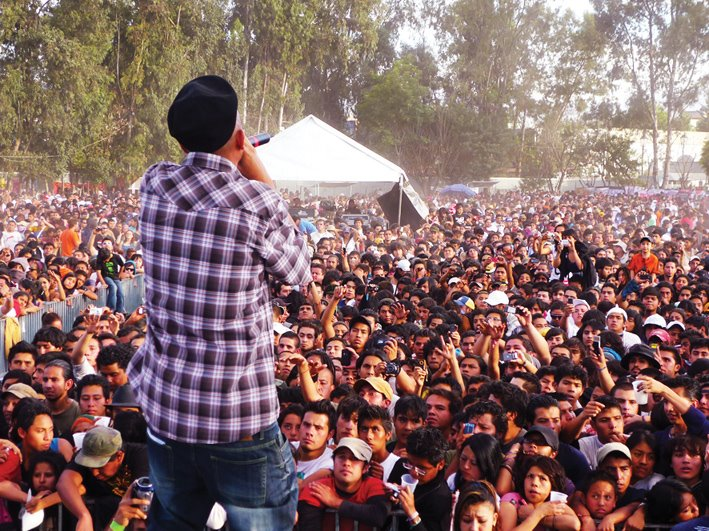
Bocafloja performance, Festival de las Resistencias, Mexico City, 2010

Existo: Matriz Preludio al Pienso, released in 2009, was the first album Bocafloja wrote and released after moving to the United States in 2008. Existo's sound is reminiscent of early 1990s classic hip hop albums with its jazz-influenced beats—a trademark of Bocafloja. The album's content does not cease to push the envelope with Bocafloja's politically infused lyric, but "Existo" stands out among previous albums with its sophisticated poetic discourse. The majority of the tracks are produced by Nuff Ced (Puerto Rico), Yallzee (Puerto Rico), and Jim B (Spain). Bocafloja collaborates with classic global hip hop artists, such as Afu-Ra, Velco (Puerto Rico), Hache ST (Dominican Republic) and Cambio from the group Para la Gente, with whom Bocafloja has formed an artistic alliance. "Quilombo" and "Las Estaciones", which was produced by Hexsagon, are the album's top singles.

In 2012, Bocafloja released Patologías del Invisible Incómodo. In this album, Bocafloja deals with the concept of the body as a vehicle of transgression toward hegemony. It is a project that speaks about the invisibility of people of color and the discomfort that individuals cause in certain settings. The album is composed of 16 soul and jazz-infused beats with profound, insightful, and always critical lyricism. The artist's website is quoted as stating, "Patologías del Invisible Incómodo is a concept album, where the interconnection & interdependence of each track signifies and globalizes a musical and discursive experience. It is not about a collection of singles." In this album, Bocafloja features collaborations with his fellow Quilomboarte collective, Cambio, Hache ST, Michelle Ricardo and Fabian Villegas, as well as Moyenei, Favi, Gabriel Teodoros, Siaira Harris, Alexandra Blakely, Guerrilla Queenz, Hollis Wong, R.E.A.L.I.D.A.D., and Indee Styla. Tracks are produced by Jim B, Danny B, Best Quality, Vnerable, Andino, Hexsagon, BeanOne, Kajmir, SK1, and Aaron Moore.

Bocafloja has shared the stage with such artists as Dead Prez, Afu-Ra, Bahamadia, Tony Touch, Ozomatli, MV Bill (Brazil), Brother Ali, J-Live, The Beatnuts, Freestyle Fellowship, Immortal Technique, K'naan, Rascalz, Intifada (Puerto Rico), Actitud Maria Marta (Argentina), and SieteNueve (Puerto Rico), among others.

=== Personal life ===
Bocafloja and his wife, Monica Haro Garcia met in Mexico City, Mexico in 2006 and later married in 2008, in New York City. The couple has one child, son Emir Villegas-Garcia (born 2009). Bocafloja lives with his family in New York City.

== Literary projects ==
In 2008 Bocafloja is in collaboration with Fabián Villegas published ImaRginación: La poética del Hip Hop como desmesura de lo político. ImaRginacion es una colección de poemas y ensayos que exploran la posibilidad de otorgarle un nuevo significado a lo político desarmando el discurso dominante del saber sometido. El texto invita al lector a un viaje en donde la resistencia, la rabia, la dignidad, el placer, el deseo, la lucha y la creación se unen en un profundo proceso en busca de la emancipación. ImaRginacion is the first literary project produced by members of the Hip Hop community in Mexico and is one of the first of its kind in the rest of Latin America and the Spanish speaking countries.

== Social and political views ==
Bocafloja understands the inherent political nature of hip hop, as a musical genre born out of marginalized communities worldwide. For that reason he utilizes his musical and literary careers as a manifestation of resistance and political participation. Bocafloja's lyrics harshly critique the oppressive nature of capitalism and first world imperialism. He has been influenced by Black and Brown political struggles throughout history. Bocafloja has been connected with several political organizations that support emancipatory and anti-colonial struggles.

== Discography ==
=== Solo albums ===
- 2002: Lengua Insurrecta (EP)
- 2003: Pienso Luego Existo
- 2004: Jazzyturno
- 2005: A Titulo Personal
- 2007: El Manual de la Otredad
- 2009: Existo: Matriz Preludio al Pienso
- 2012: Patologías del Invisible Incómodo
- 2015: Antología 2012-2015

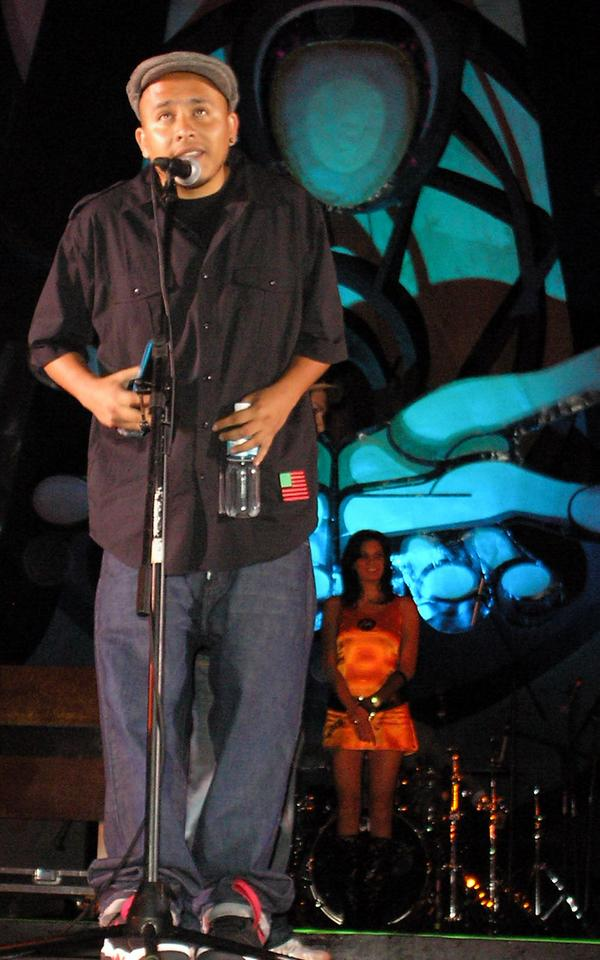
Bocafloja accepts Indie-O Award, 2008

=== Compilation albums ===
- 2006: Universo Mixtape
- 2008: Quilombo Radio: Progreso Rhythms: Vol. 1
- 2010: Quilombo Radio 2: De Diáspora, Colonia, Melanina y otras Rimas

=== Awards ===
- 2006: DJ & Clubbing Awards, Hip Hop Artist of the Year (Winner)
- 2007: Festival Pantalla de Cristal, Best Song for Film or Documentary (Winner)
- 2008: Indie-O Awards, Hip Hop/Rap Album of the Year (Winner)
- 2009: Indie-O Awards, Hip Hop/Rap Album of the Year (Winner)

== Videography ==
- 2006: Tiempo
- 2008: Soul Rebel
- 2008: Imarginación
- 2008: Autónomo
- 2009: Las Estaciones
- 2009: Quilombo Mocambo
- 2009: Iconoclasta: Microdocumental
- 2010: People
- 2010: Testigo
- 2011: Caleidoscopio: One Shot video
- 2012: Patologías del Invisible Incómodo (Short Documentary)
- 2012: Good Man
- 2012: Memoria
- 2012: Agonía
- 2012: Selva
- 2012: Segundos
- 2013: Caleidoscopio
- 2013: Keep in Moving (Native Sun)
- 2013: Aire
- 2013: Especiales Musicales de Central Once (Music Documentary for Mexican TV Station)
- 2014: Seis 25
- 2014: Mecanica
- 2014: Obsolescencia Programada
- 2015: Nana Dijo
