= Jonathan Emile =

Jamaican-Canadian rapper, singer and record producer

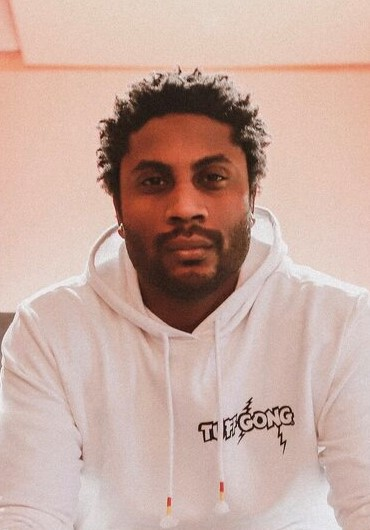
- Emile during a recording session in 2019

Background information
- Birth name: Jonathan Whyte Potter-Mäl
- Also known as: Jon E
- Born: February 19, 1986 (age 39); Montreal, Quebec, Canada
- Origin: Savanna-la-Mar, Jamaica
- Genres: Conscious hip hop; reggae; R&B; spoken word; hip hop soul
- Occupations: Rapper; poet; singer-songwriter; record producer
- Years active: 2009–present
- Labels: Mindpeacelove; Tuff Gong
- Website: http://www.mindpeacelove.com http://www.jonathanemile.com

Jonathan Whyte Potter-Mäl (born February 19, 1986), known by his stage name Jonathan Emile (or Jon E), is a Jamaican Canadian singer, rapper, record producer and cancer survivor. In October 2015, he released his debut studio album, The Lover/Fighter Document LP, which incorporates elements of hip hop, reggae, jazz, R&B and electro-pop. The independent album features collaborations with Kendrick Lamar, Murs, Buckshot and others. His debut reggae album, Spaces-in-Between, was released in January 2020 through his label MindPeaceLove and Tuff Gong.

== Life and career ==
=== Early life and cancer years ===
Jonathan Whyte Potter-Mäl was born on February 19, 1986, in the LaSalle borough of Montreal, Quebec, to a Canadian and half-American father and a Jamaican mother. He graduated from Selwyn House School in 2003.

Emile was trained at the Black Theatre Workshop youth initiative in Montreal. During and after his cancer treatment, he independently developed his knowledge on studio production and musical composition, taking on vocal training and learning to play the guitar and keyboard.

At the age of 18, Emile was diagnosed with rhabdomyosarcoma, an aggressive and highly malignant form of cancer. For the next two years, during which he underwent one year of chemotherapy treatments, followed by radiation, he employed his philosophy of "Mindpeacelove", creating music in the hospital and between his treatments. He finished treatment in December 2005 and completed his remission in December 2010.

=== 2009–2018: The Lover/Fighter Document EP, LP and Phantom Pain ===
Emile founded his own record label MindPeaceLove Ent., cooperating with a number of artists including singers, songwriters, producers and sound engineers. He declared that he would continue to use his label "as a platform to support new artists and to keep his musical creations flowing".

In 2009, Emile released The Lover/Fighter Document EP through his label. In 2013, he made his theatrical debut in the Montreal production of the Broadway musical Ain't Misbehavin'. His performance achieved broad critical acclaim from both English and French media for his performance of André De Shields' original role and his notable interpretation of "The Viper's Drag".

On October 9, 2015, Emile released The Lover/Fighter Document LP, which incorporates elements of reggae, jazz, R&B and electro-pop. The album features collaborations with Kendrick Lamar, Murs and Buckshot. Emile worked and toured with material from the album while attending McGill University as a philosophy and political science major. He released "Heaven Help Dem", featuring vocals by Kendrick Lamar, as the album's first single.

On December 29, 2016, Emile released his second studio album Phantom Pain.

=== 2019–present: Spaces-in-Between ===
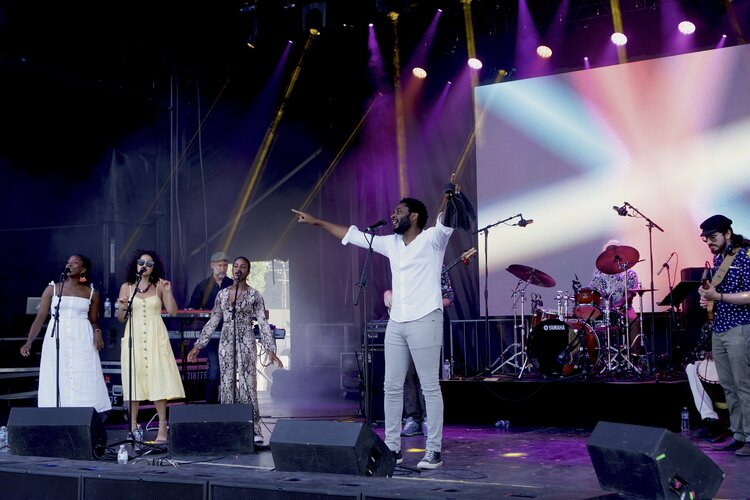
Emile performing in Smiths Falls, Ontario, in 2019

In October 2019, Emile signed a distribution deal with Jamaican record label Tuff Gong, becoming the first artist from Quebec to do so. He released "Savanna", the first single from his upcoming third studio album Spaces-in-Between, shortly after. The song is named after his family's home town of Savanna-la-Mar, Jamaica, where Emile spent a part of his childhood. In December 2019, Emile released the album's second single "Moses", with its third single "Try a Likkle More" released the following month.

Spaces-in-Between was released on January 24, 2020. The 10-track album produced and co-composed by Paul Cargnello contains all original compositions and collaborations with Ezra Lewis and Chanda T. Holmes. Emile also announced that another hip hop album with some reggae influences and a live reggae album had been recorded in 2019.

In February 2020, Emile collaborated with Jamaican singer Etana on the remix of "Canopy", the third song from Spaces-in-Between. In April 2020, he released a music video for the album's first song "Keep on Fighting", which was also released as a single in French with the title "Solidarité".

In June 2020, Emile released "Babylon Is Falling" with singer Maxi Priest. The collaboration is a remix of a song originally featured on the album Spaces-in-Between.

== Artistry ==
Emile composes and performs in the genres of hip hop, reggae, R&B and electro-pop. His vocal performance and recording style includes singing, rapping, freestyling and scatting in English, French and Jamaican Patois. Emile is concerned largely with creating contemporary popular hip hop and reggae fused with soul music that addresses social, spiritual and moral issues.

== Controversy with Top Dawg Entertainment ==
In the aftermath of the death of 18-year-old Fredy Villanueva, who was shot and killed by Montreal Police in 2008, Emile recorded "Heaven Help Dem", which was featured on The Lover/Fighter Document EP and addressed urban violence and police brutality against visible minorities. A second version of the song featuring American rapper Kendrick Lamar was later included on Emile's debut studio album The Lover/Fighter Document LP and directly addressed Villanueva and other victims of police brutality in North America, including Michael Brown, Trayvon Martin, Amadou Diallo and Sean Bell. Lamar recorded his verse for the song in 2011 prior to signing a deal with Interscope Records.

Just eight days after the song's release online in 2015, Lamar's record label Top Dawg Entertainment demanded the track be taken down on grounds of copyright infringement. Emile disputed this with YouTube and SoundCloud who had both withdrawn the song, clarifying to Billboard that his camp "paid Kendrick Lamar for a feature, and once we paid them, they basically stopped communicating with us altogether." The song was restored on the two platforms two months after its removal.

As a result of the song's removal, Emile sued Top Dawg Entertainment, Interscope and Universal Music Group. In November 2016, he was awarded CA$8,600 plus five percent yearly interest after a Quebec court ruled that Top Dawg Entertainment had wrongfully pulled "Heaven Help Dem" off the internet. The court determined that Emile had suffered financially, while his reputation also suffered due to the insinuation that his use of Lamar's verse was a copyright violation. Emile declared that the verdict was a matter of vindication of what is right and not a monetary issue. Following further legal threats by Lamar's management, Emile penned an open letter to Lamar on the matter in March 2017.

== Activism and philanthropy ==
Emile has shared his experiences, ambition and music offering mentoring and giving workshops to urban youth on various occasions.

As a Jamaican Canadian and a member of the black community, Emile participates in Black History Month and other community events. In 2013, he engaged in a "Songs of Freedom" tour of Montreal-area schools with the motto "Music as a tool for communication and social change". The tour included 15 different venues.

== Discography ==
=== Studio albums ===
List of mixtapes, with selected details
Title	Details
The Lover/Fighter Document LP	Released: October 9, 2015; Label: Mindpeacelove; Formats: CD, digital download, streaming
Phantom Pain	Released: December 27, 2016; Label: Mindpeacelove; Formats: CD, digital download, streaming
Spaces-in-Between	Released: January 24, 2020; Label: Mindpeacelove, Tuff Gong; Formats: CD, digital download, streaming

=== Extended plays ===
List of mixtapes, with selected details
Title	Details
The Lover/Fighter Document EP	Released: March 17, 2009; Label: Mindpeacelove; Formats: CD, digital download

=== Singles ===
==== As lead artist ====
Title	Year	Album
"Heaven Help Dem" (featuring Kendrick Lamar)	2015	The Lover/Fighter Document LP
"Viva Fidel!"	2016	Phantom Pain
"Where We Go from Here"	2016	Phantom Pain
"Searching"	2016	Non-album singles
"Limit" (featuring Ezra Lewis)	2016	Non-album singles
"Do You Feel Me?" (featuring Tristan D. Lalla and Tek Luciano)	2017	Non-album singles
"Wilderness"	2018	Non-album singles
"Savanna"	2019	Spaces-in-Between
"Moses"	2019	Spaces-in-Between
"Canopy (Remix)" (Note: Only the original (solo) version appears on Spaces-in-Between.) (featuring Etana)	2020	Spaces-in-Between
"Solidarité" (Note: Appears on Spaces-in-Between in English as "Keep on Fighting".)	2020	Spaces-in-Between
"Babylon Is Falling (Remix)" (Note: Only the original (solo) version appears on Spaces-in-Between.) (featuring Maxi Priest)	2020	Spaces-in-Between

==== As featured artist ====
Title	Year	Album
"Ramadan (Appropriated Remix)" (Cee featuring Jonathan Emile, Notion and Natasha Marie)	2017	Non-album singles
"Bold & Bright" (Kellyssa featuring Ezra Lewis and Jonathan Emile)	2018	Non-album singles

=== Guest appearances ===
List of non-single guest appearances, with other performing artists, showing year released and album name
Title	Year	Other artist(s)	Album
"Never Looking Back"	2013	joBlow, Shae Nicole	Poor People Music
"This Is All I Know"	2014	Cee	This Is All I Know
"After Dark"	2014	Gabriel Teodros, SoulChef	Evidence of Things Not Seen
"What It Is"	2016	Skinny Bros, KRS-One, James Di Salvio	Party Gras
"Real Talk"	2017	Notion, I L Lvibe	Heart on My Sleeve

== Filmography ==
Year	Title	Role	Notes
Film
2011	Look Again	Prospective buyer	Television film
2013	The Horse Latitudes	Male nurse	Short film
2016	Serialized	Officer Bradford	Television film
2018	On the Basis of Sex	Courier	Feature film
Television
2012	Being Human	Tall Orderly	Episode: "When I Think About You I Shred Myself"
2016	Fatal Vows	Detective Kip Young	Episode: "The Clark Case"
2017	Lost Generation	Van	Episode: "Good Learner"
2018	Jack Ryan	Members Only	Episode: "The Boy"
2019	Deadly Secrets	Lonnie	Episode: "A Killer Hand"
