= Sabzi (musician) =

American hip hop producer and DJ

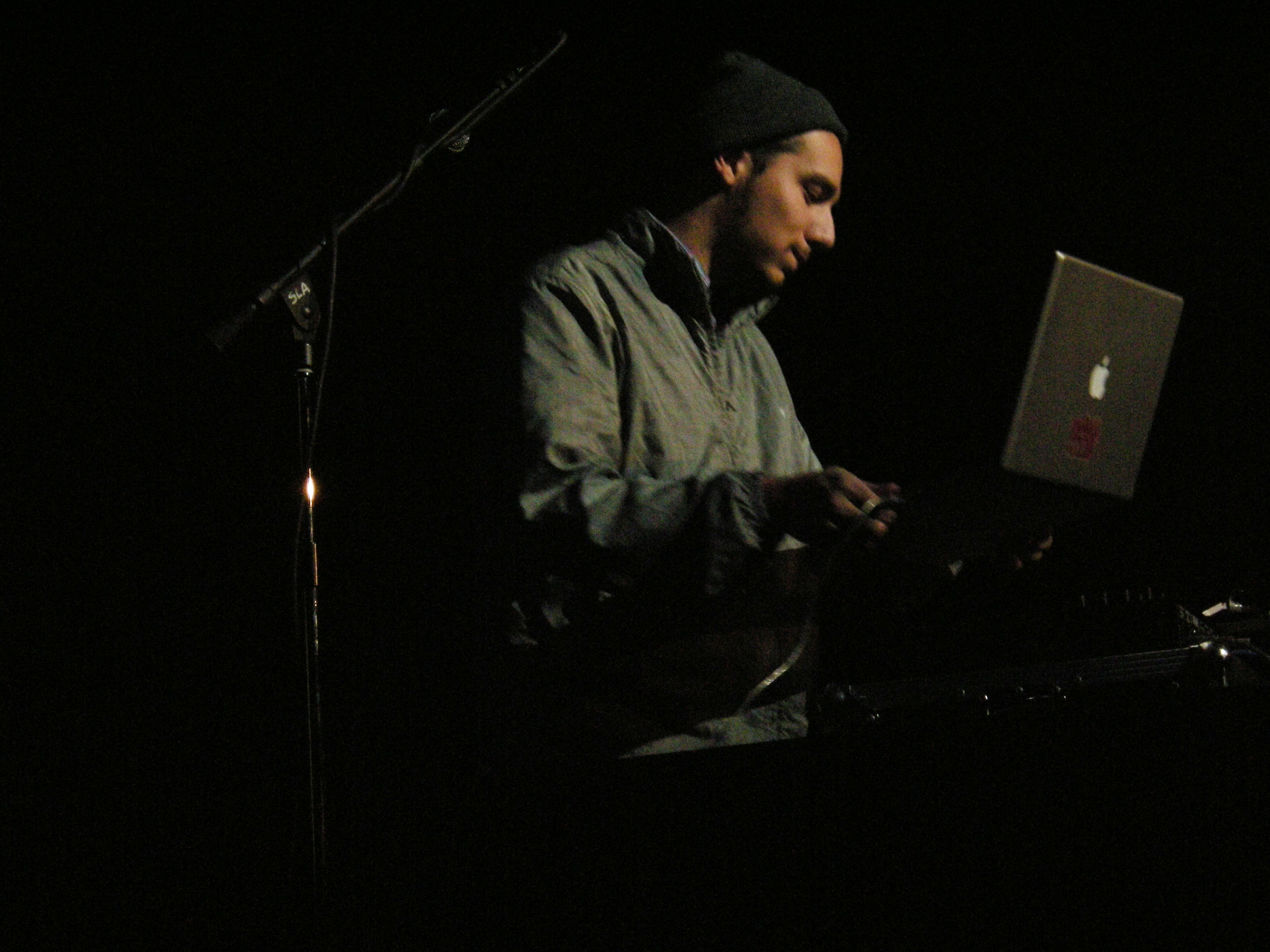
- Sabzi at the Paramount Theatre, 2008

Background information
- Born: Alexei Saba Mohajerjasbi; December 10, 1981 (age 43)
- Origin: Seattle, Washington, United States
- Genres: Hip hop; alternative hip hop
- Occupations: Producer; DJ
- Years active: 2002–present
- Labels: Massline Media; Rawkus; Duck Down
- Member of: Blue Scholars; Common Market; Made In Heights
- Website: sabzi.co

Alexei Saba Mohajerjasbi (born December 10, 1981), better known by his stage name Sabzi, is an American hip hop producer and DJ from Seattle, Washington, who is currently based in Los Angeles, California. He is a founding member of indie hip hop groups Blue Scholars, Common Market and Made In Heights.

== Early years ==
Sabzi's first and current collaboration, Blue Scholars, was formed with George Quibuyen (Geologic), whom he met at the University of Washington where they were students. They both belonged to the student group S.H.O.W. (the Student HipHop Organization of Washington). Blue Scholars soon become a Seattle hip hop staple, and declared itself a group dedicated to forward thinking and youth empowerment.

In 2004, Sabzi began working with solo artist RA Scion on his album Live and Learn. By October 2005, the two had released a self-titled album as the duo Common Market. The group found success, as Scion contributed questions about religion, politics and the state of mainstream hip-hop to Sabzi's beats. While there are overt similarities between Blue Scholars and Common Market, the two groups have distinct differences, and "their styles seem to be diverging more".

In 2009, he moved from his West Coast roots to the center of East Coast hip hop, New York City. When asked about the move by Seattle Weekly, he said "A lot of it had to do logistically with the people that I'm collaborating [with] now, some creatively, some more on the business end of things" (in reference to his work with Das Racist and what became Made In Heights in 2010). When asked about the possibility of doing a solo album, his reply was "absolutely". He ended up releasing four solo albums in 2011-2012.

== Musical career ==
Sabzi most known work is in the name of his several groups, but he has also released many solo albums as well. Having relocated to Los Angeles, California Sabzi collaborated with Kelsey Bulkin as Made In Heights. Made In Heights did a 14-stop tour in the US and Canada in September–October, 2014. Their second album, Without My Enemy What Would I Do, was released in May 2015. In the span of 2010-2013, Sabzi released fourteen solo albums.

== Discography ==
=== Studio albums ===
- Ciné Riddims (2010)
- Parthenia (2011)
- Ravena (2011)
- Dakota (2011)
- The Maplewood Playfield (2011)
- Glorious Melancholia (2011)
- Tobacco, 1 (2011)
- Tobacco, 2 (2011)
- Northwest Polynesia (2012)
- Brief Lives (2012)
- Rainier (2012)
- Delridge (2012)
- Yesler (2012)
- EXIT 163A (2012)
- Soufend (2013)
- the wøøds (2013)

=== Made In Heights ===
- Winter Pigeons (Songs To Raise Your Dead Spirits) (2010)
- Made in Heights (2013)
- Without My Enemy What Would I Do (2015)

=== Production ===
- Native Guns - "1995" from Barrel Guns (2006)
- Gabriel Teodros - "In This Together" from Lovework (2007)
- Macklemore - "The Town (Sabzi Remix)" from The Unplanned Mixtape (2009)
- Das Racist - "Who's That? Brooown!" from Shut Up, Dude (2010)
- Das Racist - "All Tan Everything" from All Tan Everything (2010)
- The Bar - "Slow Down (Yavesh Remix)" from Prometheus Brown and Bambu Walk Into A Bar (2011)
- Grynch - "My Volvo (Sabzi Remix)" from Timeless (EP) (2011)
- Fresh Daily – "Pregamin" from The Brooklyn Good Guy (2012)
