= Meklit Hadero =

Ethiopia-born American singer

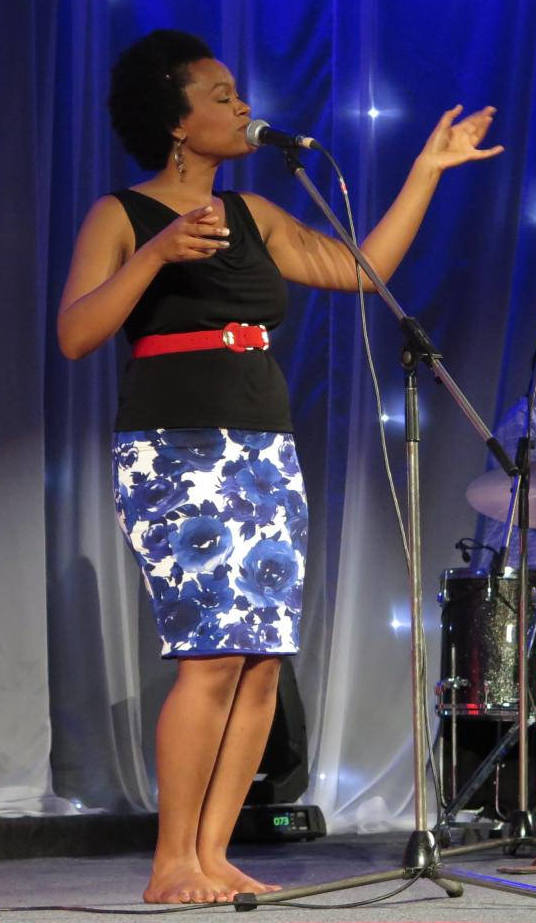

Background information
- Born: Addis Ababa, Ethiopia
- Genres: Ethio-jazz; Folk music; Soul music; Jazz
- Occupations: Singer; songwriter; producer
- Labels: Porto Franco Records, Six Degrees, Smithsonian Folkways
- Member of: CopperWire
- Website: https://www.meklitmusic.com/

Meklit Hadero, known simply as Meklit, is an Ethiopian-born American singer and songwriter based in San Francisco, California. She is known for her soulful performing style, and for combining jazz, folk, and East African influences in her music. She sings in her native Amharic, and English.

== Biography ==
Meklit Hadero was born in the Ethiopian capital, Addis Ababa, to an ethnic Kambata father and an Amhara mother. She was raised in Gainesville, FL and attended Yale University, where she studied political science.

Shortly after graduation, Meklit moved to San Francisco and became immersed in the city's thriving arts scene. "[Meklit] is an artistic giant in the early stages," wrote a reporter from the San Francisco Chronicle after witnessing an early performance in the city's Mission District. "She sings of fragility, hope and self-empowerment, and exudes all three. What's irresistible, above all, is her cradling, sensuous, gentle sound. She is stunning."

Named a TED Global Fellow in 2009, Meklit has served as an artist-in-residence at New York University, the De Young Museum, and the Red Poppy Art House. Currently a fellow of the Wildflowers Institute, Meklit has also completed musical commissions for the San Francisco Foundation and for theatrical productions staged by Brava! For Women in the Arts. She is the founder of the Arba Minch Collective, a group of Ethiopian artists in diaspora devoted to nurturing ties to their homeland through collaborations with both traditional and contemporary artists there. As a Senior TED Fellow since 2011, she co-founded the Nile Project with Egyptian ethno-musicologist Mina Girgis and has since participated in 2 artist residencies (Aswan, 2013 and Uganda in 2014) uniting musicians from 11 countries all along the Nile Basin.

Two songs by Meklit Hadero were chosen by writer/director Tamar Halpern for her film Jeremy Fink and the Meaning of Life - "You and the Rain" and "Walk Up".

== Discography ==
Meklit has released eight records to date. The first was a self-produced eight-song EP entitled Eight Songs (2008). The second, her first full-length LP, On a Day Like This... released to wide critical acclaim in 2010. It was recorded at San Francisco's Closer Studios and produced by Eric Moffat and Unsound Recording. Hailed by Filter magazine for "[combining] New York jazz with West Coast folk and African flourishes, all bound together by Hadero's beguiling voice.". It won Meklit feature stories by NPR, PBS, and National Geographic. The San Francisco Chronicle called her " an artistic giant in the making".

The San Francisco Bay Guardian (cover photo: http://www.sfbg.com/2014/03/18/rise-meklit-hadero) writes: "what sucks you in, what keeps your eyes and ears locked on Meklit, what makes an unselfconscious "Damn!" start to grow at the back of your mouth is her voice: lilting, sensuous, capable of the leap from staccato jazz-cat to honeyed songbird, she conveys both fragility and great strength in a single line."

The Village Voice comments : "She's a blithe-voiced daughter of Joni who considers music a path to higher ground, with rest stops for the likes of Talking Heads and Lou Reed."

Solo albums

- On a Day Like This... (Porto Franco Records, 2010)
- We Are Alive (Six Degrees Records, March 18, 2014)
- When the People Move, the Music Moves Too (Six Degrees Records, January 23, 2017)
- A Piece Of Infinity (Smithsonian Folkways, September 26, 2025)

Collaborative albums

- Earthbound (with Gabriel Teodros & Burntface, as CopperWire) (Porto Franco Records, April 7, 2012)
- Meklit & Quinn (with Quinn DeVeaux) (Porto Franco Records, September 18, 2012)

EPs

- Eight Songs (self-released, 2008)
- Ethio Blue (self-released, March 8, 2024)
