= Sheeko =

- Cover of issue #6 of Sheeko magazine, featuring Somali supermodel Iman.
- Categories: Lifestyle
- Frequency: Quarterly
- Founded: 2006
- Country: United Kingdom
- Based in: London
- Language: English
- Website: Sheeko magazine

Sheeko is a glossy lifestyle magazine aimed at Horn Africans (Somalis, Ethiopians and Eritreans). The magazine is published quarterly in London. It covers current events, health, fashion, beauty, career and contemporary living, topics that are of interest to the Horn African community.

== History ==
Sheeko was founded in 2006. It was conceived as a way to counter the negative stereotypes surrounding the people from these regions.

== Mission ==
Sheeko endeavours to pull together Somalis, Eritreans and Ethiopians, or rather, the Horn of Africa collectively. The term Sheeko means "narrative" or "story" in the Somali language.
