= Lovework =

Studio album by Gabriel Teodros
- Released: February 27, 2007
- Genre: Hip-hop
- Length: 55:00
- Label: MassLine
- Producers: Amos Miller; Sabzi; Kitone; Specs-One

Professional ratings
Review scores
Source	Rating
AllHipHop	3.5/5 stars
ColorLines	favorable
JIVE Magazine	4.5/5 stars
Okayplayer	4/5 stars
OneTwoOneTwo	4/5 stars
RapReviews	6.5/10 stars
Rolling Stone	3.5/5 stars
Shotgun Reviews	4.5/5 stars
URB Magazine	3.5/5 stars

Lovework, is the critically acclaimed debut album by Gabriel Teodros, released on February 27, 2007 by MassLine Media.

== Overview ==
Aesthetically and politically, Lovework descends from a mid-'90s school of conscious Northwest hip hop, characterized by groups such as Black Anger and Silent Lambs Project. It was a time when the Seattle sound became jazzier—more melodic, intricate, and atmospheric. It turned away from the gangsta themes and beats that dominated the period and instead focused on progressive politics, utopian aspirations, and an organic connection with black Africa.

Lovework was produced by Amos Miller with additional beat contributions from Sabzi (of Blue Scholars), Kitone, and Specs One – its sound was primarily influenced by Seattle veteran Vitamin D (who also mixed the record) and the late J Dilla.

On Lovework, Gabriel Teodros ponders issues of racism, sexism, and colonialism, as well as lighter topics like romance and the art of rhyme.

The opening song Sacred Texts creatively namedrops groups of influence in Teodros' life, including A Tribe Called Quest, Freestyle Fellowship, Common, Boogie Down Productions, Public Enemy, Roy Ayers and Bob Marley.

In the song East Africa, Teodros first speaks about his family and how he grew up, and then goes on to talk about the 2005 Ethiopian police massacres.

The album title, Lovework was inspired by bell hooks and her book All About Love, where Hooks insists that to truly know love, one must agree that love is a verb. She goes further to say to truly know love, one must work to undo every system of domination that stops people from truly loving. The title was also inspired by a quote from Khalil Gibran's The Prophet where Gibran says "Work is love made visible".

There were 3 official music videos made for the Lovework album. The first 2 were both directed by Zia Mohajerjasbi; No Label (Esma Remix) and Don't Cry For Us featuring Khingz & Toni Hill. The third video was for Third World Wide and was directed by Salvatore Fullmore.

The album held the #1 spot on the CMJ Hip Hop charts for 2 weeks and came in at #19 for the year 2007.

== Track listing ==
No.	Title	Producer(s)	Length
1.	"Sacred Texts (Intro)"	Amos Miller; Ethan Lawton	1:27
2.	"Do U" (featuring Jerm)	Amos Miller	3:04
3.	"No Label (Esma Remix)"	Sabzi; Moka Only	3:24
4.	"Beautiful (GT Version)"	Amos Miller; Mark Oi	3:50
5.	"Sexcapism"	Amos Miller; Jeff Huston	3:55
6.	"Racoon Rock" (featuring Toni Hill)	Amos Miller	3:38
7.	"East Africa"	Amos Miller; Mark Oi	3:11
8.	"Don't Cry For Us" (featuring Khingz and Toni Hill)	Amos Miller	2:35
9.	"In This Together"	Sabzi	3:59
10.	"The Dirty 6 (skit)"	Amos Miller	0:49
11.	"It's That" (featuring Geologic)	Amos Miller; Mark Oi	3:38
12.	"Third World Wide"	Kitone	3:26
13.	"Warriors (Lovework Reprise)"	Amos Miller	3:44
14.	"Chili Sauce"	Specs-One; Amos Miller	2:51
15.	"Find A Place" (featuring Rajnii Eddins)	Amos Miller	3:42
16.	"Lovework" (featuring Toni Hill)	Amos Miller; Jonas Siegal	4:00
17.	"Rest O' Me Dayz" (featuring Khingz)	Amos Miller	3:47
Total length:			55:00
