= Relleno negro =

Mexican dish

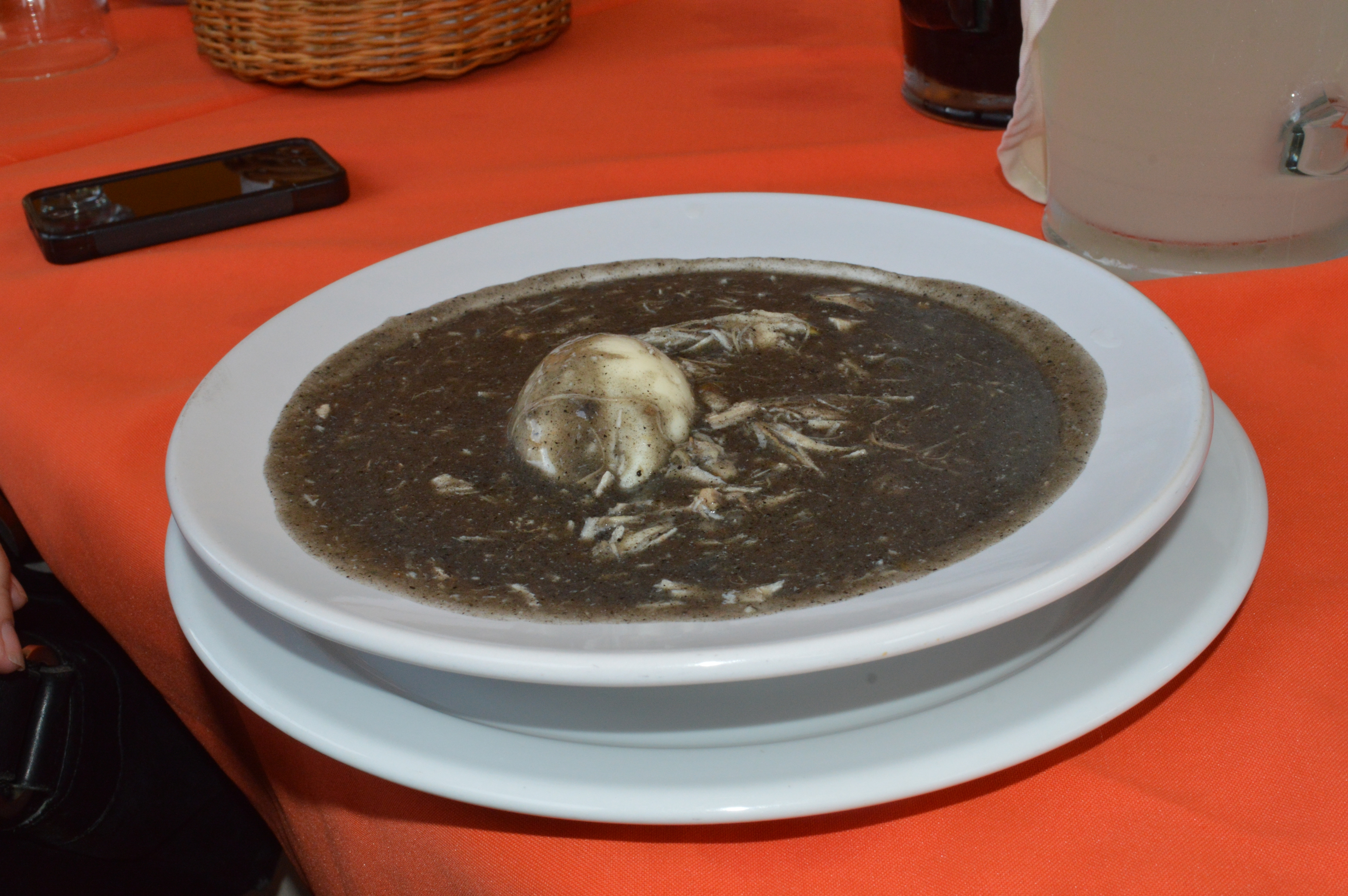
Turkey relleno negro

Relleno negro (black stuffing) is a dish from Yucatán, México, based on turkey, pork and mixed chili peppers (chilmole). It is traditionally prepared in the month of November in a festival called Hanal Pixán.

The original recipe contains turkey, ground pork to make the but (meatball), tomato, chilmole, achiote, black pepper, cloves, cumin, oregano, epazote, garlic and boiled eggs. The black color for the stew comes from the mixture and toast of the chilies that are used in the chilmole, among which we can find: ancho chili, black peppers, cloves, cumin, natural achiote, burnt tortillas, sour orange juice, garlic, oregano and salt.
