= Ximbo =

Traditional pork dish from Eastern Mexico

Ximbo (from nximbo meaning “the heart of the maguey”) is a traditional pit-barbecued pork dish from the Mexican states of Hidalgo and México. It originated in the Mezquital Valley, mainly in the municipality of Actopan. Ximbo is an Otomi word. It is generally made from pork, beef, pork cueritos, fish, and chicken fried in chili sauce with nopalitos, cumin, oregano, and onions. It is then wrapped in small packages made of century plant leaf.

Although pre-Hispanic techniques are used in its preparation, such as the earth oven; This particular dish began to be prepared in the late 1980s. At first it was called pollo en penca, and in the mid-1990s it began to be called ximbó; According to tradition, named after the Otomi people of the region.

== See also ==
- Mixiote
- List of Mexican dishes
