= RA Scion =

American rapper

- Born: Ryan Abeo
- Origin: Seattle, Washington
- Genres: Hip hop, alternative hip hop, northwest hip hop
- Occupation: Rapper
- Years active: 2002–present
- Labels: SCIONtific; Massline
- Member of: Common Market
- Website: www.rascion.com

Ryan Abeo better known by his stage name RA Scion, is an American alternative hip hop artist from Louisville, Kentucky. He is currently based in Seattle, Washington. Abeo is a member of the hip hop group Common Market along with DJ/Producer Sabzi. Abeo, with his wife, manages the independent record label SCIONtific Records.

== Early life ==
Ryan Abeo was born and raised in Louisville, Kentucky in 1974. Abeo began writing and recording hip hop lyrics when he was twelve years old, after being introduced to the 1980s hip hop group Fat Boys. By the time he was a senior in high school, he was experiencing tensions with school authorities, which led him to drop out completely. Still pursuing hip hop, he attended Northern Kentucky University, before dropping out. Following this, he settled in Seattle, Washington, where he would become a notable figure to the Northwest hip hop scene.

== Musical career ==
Soon after Abeo moved to Seattle, he met Sabzi, a DJ/Producer who was at the time just forming his group Blue Scholars with Geologic, through the local hip hop circuit. The two got along as friends and bonded over their shared Baháʼí Faith. Sabzi began collaboration by giving a few instrumentals to RA which went on his first project, Live & Learn. Together, the two officially formed the group Common Market, which would become a staple in putting Northwest hip hop in a prime position. Since then, he has released four studio albums as RA Scion and a 5th album with Gifted Youngstaz as the duo "TRUE||FORM".

== Personal life ==
Abeo has a wife named Mariangela and one child named Madison. As a family, they have lived all around the world, from Crete, Greece to Zambia, Africa.

== Style and influences ==
He cites Chuck D, A Tribe Called Quest and De La Soul as important influences.

== Discography ==
Studio albums

- Live And Learn (SCIONtific, 2004)
- Victor Shade (SCIONtific, 2010)
- Adding To The Extra (SCIONtific, 2013)
- Sharper Tool; Bigger Weapon (SCIONtific, 2014)
- TRUE||FORM (TRUE||FORM, 2019)

EPs

- Apostrophe (SCIONtific, 2002)
- More Power To You (SCIONtific, 2016)
- TRUE||FORM: "GENUFLEXION" (TRUE||FORM, 2023)

Guest appearances

- Grynch – "You Know Me (Remix)" from Chemistry 1.5
- CunninLynguists – "Guide You Through Shadows" from Strange Journey Volume Three

=== Videography ===
- 2010: "Soothsayer"
- 2012: "Beg X Borrow X Steal"
- 2013: "Guttersnipe Bridge"
- 2014: "Fixed"
- 2014: "Venus in Transit"
- 2016: "Action Figures"
- 2016: "Death of a Precedent"
