= Trinity International Hip Hop Festival =

The Trinity International Hip Hop Festival is a free music festival that brings together Hip Hop artists from around the world. It has been held annually at Trinity College in Hartford, CT since 2006.

"The festival was designed to promote international understanding and community development through hip-hop." It is "the first and only free global Hip-Hop festival dedicated to educating and exposing the public to Hip-Hop from around the world."

The festival was co-founded by Trinity College students Jason Azevedo and Magee McIlvaine and Nomadic Wax founder Ben Herson to "combat the disunity, segregation, and violence of Hartford, CT and Trinity College using the historically education-oriented and politically revolutionary medium — Hip Hop – and focusing on its global potency and proliferation to unify Trinity College, the city of Hartford, and the Globe."

The concert portion of the 2009 festival was headlined by Somali Hip Hop artist K'Naan and featured performances by many artists, including BeatBurgerBand from the Czech Republic, Poetic Pilgrimage from the United Kingdom, Blitz the Ambassador from Ghana, and Game Rebellion from Brooklyn, NY.

In 2018, many international opening acts were scheduled. Because of increased visa restrictions under the Trump administration, many visas were delayed, and organizers couldn't be certain which artists would be attending until a week before the event.

The festival does not focus solely on the musical aspect of Hip Hop; B-boy battles, graffiti art sessions, panel discussions about pressing issues in Hip Hop, and film screenings have been incorporated into the festival each year.

As part of a class taught in Fall 2017 by Seth Markle, a professor of History and International Studies at Trinity College, 15 students created short films profiling Hip Hop pioneers from Hartford for the Hartford History Center.

== See also ==
- List of hip hop music festivals
- Hip hop culture
