= Under the Volcano Festival =

Annual activist, grassroots gathering in Canada

Under the Volcano Festival of Art & Social Change was an activist, grassroots cultural gathering held at Whey-Ah-Wichen/Cates Park on the traditional lands of the Tsleil-Waututh Nation in North Vancouver, Canada. The festival was held each August for 20 years, with 2010 being its last. It was Canada's largest annual political arts festival and was 100% volunteer produced. The festival took its name from the novel of the same name by the English writer Malcolm Lowry, who squatted adjacent to the festival site from 1947 to 1954.

The festival was founded in 1990 by social activist and artist Irwin Oostindie, and was collaboratively produced by volunteers who represented social movements in the region. UTV featured a number of high-profile activists and entertainers in its 20 years of existence, including: Ward Churchill, Faith Nolan, Kinnie Starr, Paint, Kathleen Yearwood, Tegan & Sara, Naomi Klein and Lourdes Perez. More than 100 political projects and organizations set up tables at the festival, and an annual Activist Directory was distributed throughout the region, connecting the festival to political movements and work year-round. The festival provided a platform for Indigenous artists, activists and issues. The festival project expanded in the mid-1990s to include Under the Volcano Festival Kootenays and the annual Kootenay Moving Pictures Film Festival in Nelson, B.C.
