= Lost Time (Tacocat album) =

Studio album by Tacocat
- Released: April 1, 2016
- Genre: Pop-punk
- Length: 32:50
- Label: Hardly Art
- Producer: Erik Blood

Tacocat chronology
NVM (2014)	Lost Time (2016)	This Mess is a Place (2019)

Lost Time is the third studio album by Seattle-based pop-punk band Tacocat, released on April 1, 2016 on Hardly Art. It was produced by Erik Blood.

== Critical reception ==
Professional ratings
Aggregate scores
Source	Rating
Metacritic	76/100
Review scores
Source	Rating
AllMusic	4/5 stars
The A.V. Club	B+
Consequence of Sound	B–
Pitchfork	6.1/10
PopMatters	7/10
Rolling Stone	3.5/5 stars
The Skinny	4/5 stars
Spin	6/10
Under the Radar	7.5/10
Vice (Expert Witness)	A–

According to review aggregator Metacritic, based on 13 critic reviews, Lost Time has a score of 76 out of 100, indicating "generally favorable reviews".

=== Accolades ===
Publication	Accolade	Year	Rank
Paste	The 50 Best Albums of 2016	2016	27
The Skinny	Top 50 Albums of 2016	2016	13

== Track listing ==
1. "Dana Katherine Scully" – 3:12
2. "FDP" – 1:29
3. "I Love Seattle" – 2:36
4. "I Hate the Weekend" – 2:05
5. "You Can't Fire Me, I Quit" – 2:13
6. "The Internet" – 2:48
7. "Plan A, Plan B" – 1:54
8. "Talk" – 2:54
9. "Men Explain Things to Me" – 1:56
10. "Horse Grrls" – 2:19
11. "Night Swimming" – 2:26
12. "Leisure Bees" – 6:59

== Personnel ==
- Eric Blood – engineer, producer
- Lelah Maupin – artwork, group member
- Bree McKenna – group member
- Emily Nokes – artwork, group member
- Kelly O – photography
- Eric Randall – group member
- Adam Straney – mastering
- Tacocat – drawing, primary artist
