= Shana Cleveland =

American songwriter

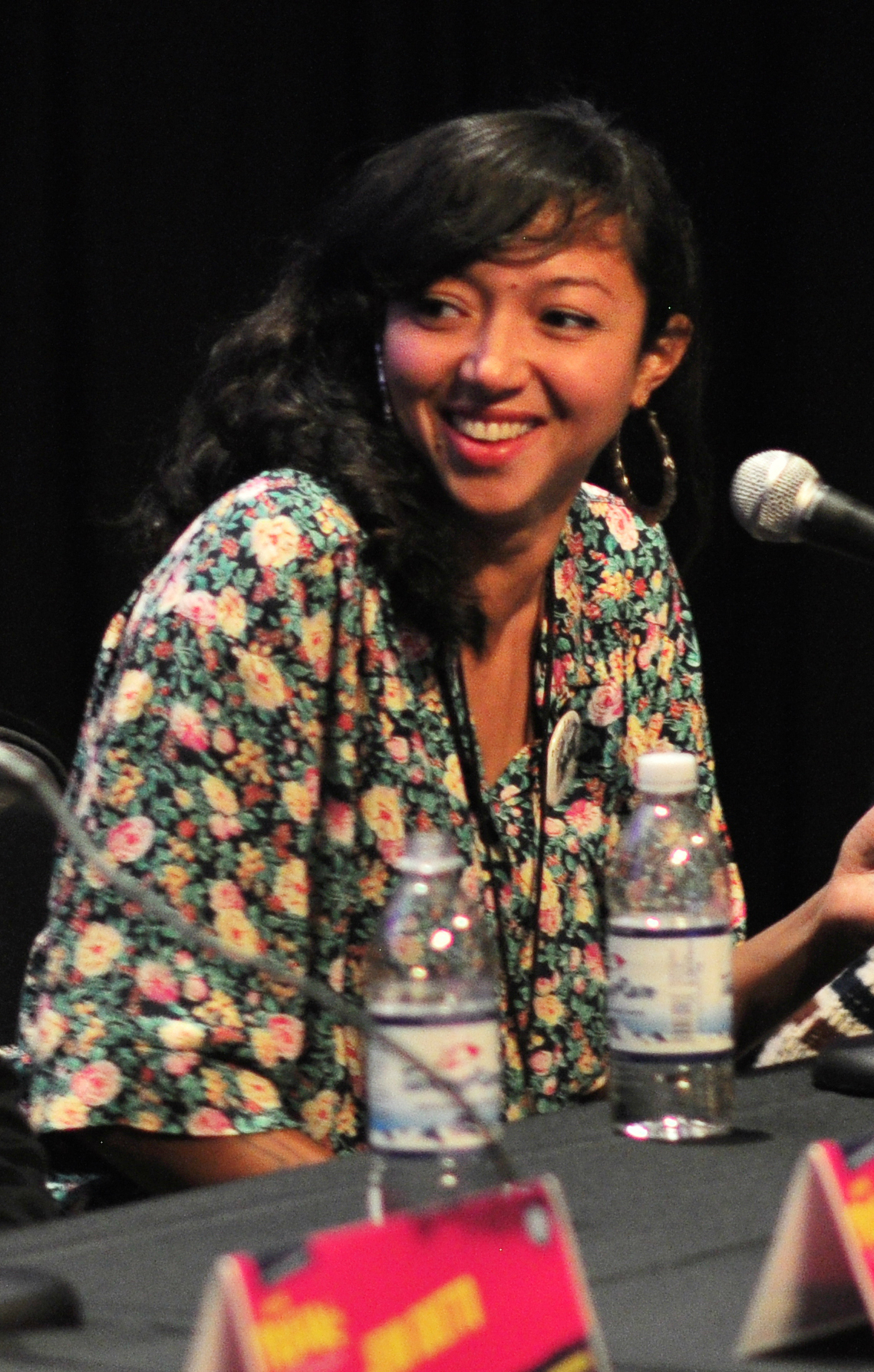

Background information
- Born: Kalamazoo, Michigan, United States
- Genres: Surf rock, folk, acoustic, Psychedelic rock
- Occupation: Musician
- Instruments: Guitar, banjo, vocals
- Label: Hardly Art
- Member of: La Luz; Shana Cleveland and the Sandcastles; The Curious Mystery
- Website: shanacleveland.com

Shana Cleveland is an American musician, writer, and visual artist based in Los Angeles, California. Best known as the lead guitarist and vocalist for surf rock band La Luz, Cleveland was previously a member of The Curious Mystery, and has also released music as a solo artist. Cleveland's writing and visual art has appeared in publications such as Black Clock, the Columbia Poetry Review, Court Green, and Vice.

== Discography ==
=== With La Luz ===
- Damp Face EP (2012)
- It's Alive (2013)
- Weirdo Shrine (2015)
- Floating Features (2018)
- La Luz (2021)
- News of the Universe (2024)

=== With The Curious Mystery ===
- Rotting Slowly (2009)
- We Creeling (2011)

=== Solo ===
- Oh Man, Cover the Ground (2015) (as Shana Cleveland and the Sandcastles)
- Night of the Worm Moon (2019)
- Manzanita (2023)
