= I Used to Spend So Much Time Alone =

Studio album by Chastity Belt
- Released: June 2, 2017
- Recorded: 2016
- Studio: Jackpot! Studios (Portland, Oregon)
- Length: 54:00
- Label: Hardly Art
- Producer: Matthew Simms

Chastity Belt chronology
| Time to Go Home (2015) | I Used to Spend So Much Time Alone (2017) | Chastity Belt (2019) |

Singles from I Used to Spend So Much Time Alone
- 1. "Different Now" Released: March 8, 2017; 2. "Caught in a Lie" Released: April 4, 2017

I Used to Spend So Much Time Alone is the third studio album by American indie rock band, Chastity Belt. It was released on June 2, 2017, by Hardly Art. With the intention of making a more serious record than their previous ones, the band finished the album after an 8-day recording session with the producer Matthew Simms. I Used to Spend So Much Time Alone was met with generally positive reviews from music critics. Many critics called it a "more serious" record, with some of them hinting it included sadder aesthetics and was "built on what John Keats defined as 'negative capability'". Two singles preceded the album's release: the lead single "Different Now" on March 8, 2017 and the second single "Caught in a Lie" on April 4, 2017. The band embarked on a North American and European tour in support of the album.

== Background and recording ==
During the band's recording session of new material after the release of their second studio album Time to Go Home (2015), they told AAA Backstage that they have "learned so much" since Time to Go Home, saying: "Looking back on recording Time to Go Home, I really feel like we had no idea what we were doing. We've grown so much over the past couple years, as people and musicians." In an interview with Spin, Chastity Belt's vocalist, Julia Shapiro said: "That's something we realized, that we don't have to play joke songs in order to have fun. We can play serious songs and still have fun with it." When asked about the song she is most excited for, she singled out "Used to Spend", then-called "I Used to Spend So Much Time Alone", hinting it could end up naming its parent album as well.

With the producer Matthew Simms, the band spent 8 days in Jackpot! Studios, Portland, Oregon, and recorded 14 songs for their album. Shapiro stated that their playing has become "tighter" and "more confident" during the making of the album, with their songwriting becoming more "assured" and "collaborative". She also revealed that I Used to Spend So Much Time Alone included Time to Go Home's many sound and theme characteristics, also a "clearer, fuller production and more guitar overdubs."

== Release and promotion ==
I Used to Spend So Much Time Alone was released on June 2, 2017, by Hardly Art. The album's cover picture was taken by Stephen Steinbrink, with editing and arranging being handled by Jake Muilenburgi, who also did the cover of the band's debut studio album, No Regerts (2013). The CD copies of I Used to Spend So Much Time Alone were produced in a digipak format, while the limited edition vinyl copies were colored. Both the CD and vinyl copies included a digital album download. Cassette copies of the album were also produced.

To promote the album, Chastity Belt embarked on a tour that visited North America and Europe. The first performance was on June 1, 2017, in Seattle, Washington, at Crocodile Cafe, which was the record release show. Hardly Art first announced that the tour was going to be ended on September 23, 2017, in Utrecht, Netherlands, at ACU, later added one more show that was on October 18, 2017, in Seattle, Washington, at Chop Suey. The tour included 35 performances. At selected dates, the band performed with groups such as So Pitted, Magic Potion, GANG, and Charly Bliss.

Performance dates
| Date | City | Country | Venue |
|---|---|---|---|
North America
| June 1, 2017 | Seattle | United States | Crocodile Cafe |
| June 14, 2017 | Milwaukee | United States | Cactus Club |
| June 15, 2017 | Chicago | United States | Subterranean |
| June 16, 2017 | Detroit | United States | Jumbo's |
| June 17, 2017 | Toronto | Canada | Longboat Hall at the Great Hall |
| June 18, 2017 | Montreal | Canada | Bar Le Ritz |
| June 19, 2017 | Boston | United States | Brighton Music Hall |
| June 20, 2017 | Brooklyn | United States | Music Hall of Williamsburg |
| June 22, 2017 | Philadelphia | United States | PhilaMOCA |
| June 23, 2017 | Washington, D.C. | United States | Songbyrd |
| June 24, 2017 | Durham | United States | The Pinhook |
| June 25, 2017 | Asheville | United States | The Mothlight |
| June 27, 2017 | Atlanta | United States | Masquerade (Purgatory) |
| June 28, 2017 | Nashville | United States | DRKMTTR |
| June 29, 2017 | St. Louis | United States | Off Broadway |
| June 30, 2017 | Iowa City | United States | Gabe’s |
| July 1, 2017 | Minneapolis | United States | 7th St. Entry |
Europe
| September 4, 2017 | Margate | United Kingdom | The Dugout |
| September 5, 2017 | Leeds | United Kingdom | Brudenell Social Club |
| September 6, 2017 | Manchester | United Kingdom | Star and Garter |
| September 7, 2017 | Newcastle | United Kingdom | Cluny |
| September 8, 2017 | Glasgow | United Kingdom | Broadcast |
| September 11, 2017 | Bristol | United Kingdom | Exchange |
| September 12, 2017 | Nottingham | United Kingdom | Bodega |
| September 13, 2017 | Brighton | United Kingdom | Green Door Store |
| September 14, 2017 | London | United Kingdom | Garage |
| September 15, 2017 | Brussels | Belgium | Witloof Bar |
| September 16, 2017 | Cologne | Germany | King Georg |
| September 17, 2017 | Berlin | Germany | Kantine Am Berghain |
| September 19, 2017 | Vienna | Austria | Arena |
| September 20, 2017 | Lausanne | Switzerland | La Romandie Club |
| September 21, 2017 | Paris | France | Espace B |
| September 22, 2017 | Rotterdam | Netherlands | V11 |
| September 23, 2017 | Utrecht | Netherlands | ACU |
North America
| October 18, 2017 | Seattle | United States | Chop Suey |

I Used to Spend So Much Time Alone was also promoted by two single, three music video releases and a promotional single release. The opening track "Different Now" was released as the lead single off of the album on March 8, 2017, along with its music video. The second single "Caught in a Lie" was released on April 4, 2017. Chastity Belt released the album's closing track, "5am", as a promotional single before the album release. Additionally, the band released two music videos for two non-single tracks: "Used to Spend" and "Stuck".

== Critical reception ==
Professional ratings
Aggregate scores
| Source | Rating |
|---|---|
| AnyDecentMusic? | 7.3/10 |
| Metacritic | 79/100 |
Review scores
| Source | Rating |
| AllMusic | 3.5/5 stars |
| The A.V. Club | B |
| DIY | 4/5 stars |
| Drowned in Sound | 9/10 |
| Exclaim! | 7/10 |
| NPR | Positive |
| Paste | 7.7/10 |
| Pitchfork | 7.4/10 |
| PopMatters | Positive |
| Spin | Mixed |

I Used to Spend So Much Time Alone received generally positive reviews from music critics. At Metacritic, which assigns a normalized rating out of 100 to reviews from mainstream critics, the album received a score of 79, based on 18 reviews, which indicates "generally favorable reviews". Giving the album 3 and a half stars out of 5, Mark Deming of AllMusic said if the band were "a different band on their third album, they're still strong, passionate, and compelling, and this music engages the listener with its intelligence, honesty, and lean but muscular sound", later describing the album as "clever". The A.V. Club's Annie Zaleski gave the album a B rating, stating it is "a markedly more serious record [than their previous ones], though still a relatable one." She also commented on its lyrical content, saying while the lyrics "can be blunt, even casual in their demeanor, they're paired with plenty of sonic turmoil."

Spin's Geena Kloeppel wrote the album "flows more smoothly than previous releases," and felt it is the band's "growing up" to see song titles like "Caught in a Lie" and "Different Now". Mike Katzif of NPR noted it is "a thoughtful, reflective album, constantly searching for direction to and questioning every solitary, restless feeling, yet it's that intimacy that allows us to know a new, perhaps truer side to the artists." Writing about its instrumental content, he felt the album "doesn't mess with the band's signature fuzzy guitar rock, so much as refine it. The album's instrumental depth allows the music to stretch, sway and gradually unfold to new places." About the album's lyrics, DIY writer El Hunt said, "this record is centred on questions that can't be answered, and a nothingness that can't be filled." He added that the album "isn't as callow as previous Chastity Belt records, and intentionally so, fully digging up the sadness that always lay ever-dormant beneath their tinny-swigging chaos, and leaving behind biting mockery for something that feels vaguer, and also more universal."

Ryan J. Pardo of Paste gave the album a score of 7.7 out of 10 and wrote, "The whole album is awash in swaths of watery shimmer, as if recorded underwater." Giving the album a score of 7.4, Pitchfork writer Sasha Geffen felt the "varied taxonomy of the band gels together as they relay the psychological slog of trying really hard to just be OK."

Describing it as a "killer album", Robert Loss of PopMatters felt I Used to Spend So Much Time Alone was "built on what John Keats defined as 'negative capability'" and the band "practices a contemporary version of what the painter and critic Manny Farber defined as 'termite art.'" He also felt the album was "obviously more serious" than the band's previous albums. Exclaim!'s Mackenzie Herd wrote "I Used to Spend So Much Time Alone is an accurate depiction of the lull and forced introspection that follows the second adolescence that is early adult independence; new desires emerge, and on this record, it seems that Chastity Belt wish to be taken more seriously — both by themselves and others." and gave the album a rating of 7 out of 10. Giving the album 9 points out of 10, Joe Goggings of Drowned in Sound said it is "pretty in its sonic gloominess and witty in the way that it wears its anxieties on its sleeve, but what makes it special is the way that all of that is grounded by the sturdiest of anchors - the quiet optimism that friendship inspires."

== Track listing ==
All tracks produced by Matthew Simms. All tracks written by Julia Shapiro, except where noted.

I Used to Spend So Much Time Alone – Standard edition
| No. | Title | Length |
|---|---|---|
| 1. | "Different Now" | 3:48 |
| 2. | "Caught in a Lie" | 3:55 |
| 3. | "This Time of Night" | 4:00 |
| 4. | "Stuck" (Gretchen Grimm) | 3:44 |
| 5. | "Complain" | 4:44 |
| 6. | "It's Obvious" | 3:43 |
| 7. | "What the Hell" | 3:35 |
| 8. | "Something Else" | 4:54 |
| 9. | "Used to Spend" | 4:16 |
| 10. | "5am" | 5:40 |

I Used to Spend So Much Time Alone – Bonus tracks
| No. | Title | Length |
|---|---|---|
| 11. | "Don't Worry" (Gretchen Grimm) | 3:32 |
| 12. | "Bender" (Lydia Lund) | 4:38 |
| 13. | "I'm Fine" | 3:31 |
| Total length: | | 54:00 |

== Charts ==
| Chart (2017) | Peak position |
|---|---|
| US Independent Albums (Billboard) | 39 |
