= Tidelands (album) =

Studio album by The Moondoggies
- Released: October 12, 2010
- Genre: Rock
- Length: 42:14
- Label: Hardly Art

The Moondoggies chronology
| Don't Be a Stranger (2008) | Tidelands (2010) | Adiós I'm a Ghost (2013) |

Professional ratings
Review scores
| Source | Rating |
|---|---|
| Allmusic | 4/5 stars |
| Pitchfork Media | 5.2/10 |

Tidelands is the second studio album by American rock band The Moondoggies. It was released in October 2010 under Hardly Art.

== Track listing ==
| No. | Title | Length |
|---|---|---|
| 1. | "It's a Shame, It's a Pity" | 2:43 |
| 2. | "Tidelands" | 3:17 |
| 3. | "What Took so Long" | 5:48 |
| 4. | "Uncertain" | 5:13 |
| 5. | "Empress of the North" | 3:48 |
| 6. | "Lead Me On" | 3:53 |
| 7. | "Down the Well" | 5:35 |
| 8. | "Can't Be in the Middle" | 3:30 |
| 9. | "We Can't All Be Blessed" | 5:16 |
| 10. | "A Lot of People on My Mind" | 3:11 |
