= Family (Le Loup album) =

Le Loup

Studio album by Le Loup
- Released: 22 September 2009
- Genre: Indie
- Length: 46:44
- Label: Hardly Art

Le Loup chronology
The Throne of the Third Heaven of the Nations' Millennium General Assembly (album) (2007)	Le Loup (2009)

Professional ratings
Review scores
Source	Rating
Allmusic	4/5 stars
The Arts Section	(Positive)
Drowned In Sound	(7/10)

Family is the second album by indie band Le Loup. It was released on September 22, 2009.

== Track listing ==
All songs credited to Le Loup

1. "Saddle Mountain" – 2:06
2. "Beach Town" – 4:13
3. "Grow" – 3:20
4. "Morning Song" – 4:41
5. "Family" – 4:10
6. "Forgive Me" – 5:02
7. "Go East" – 5:02
8. "Golden Bell" – 1:22
9. "Sherpa" – 5:30
10. "Neahkahnie" – 3:22
11. "A Celebration" – 7:53

== Personnel ==
- Sam Simkoff – keyboard, banjo
- Christian Ervin – computer
- Michael Ferguson – guitar
- Robert Sahm – drums
- Jim Thomson – guitar

== Blackberry Commercial ==
The single "Morning Song" was used in 2010 BlackBerry Messenger (BBM) Television Commercials.
