= NVM =

NVM may refer to:

== Arts and entertainment ==
- NVM (album), a 2014 album by Tacocat
- N. V. M. Gonzalez (1915–1999), Filipino author
- National Videogame Museum (United States), Frisco, Texas (opened 2016)

== Technology ==
- NewVoiceMedia, a call centre cloud service company
- Node Version Manager, a Node.js tool
- Non-volatile memory, a type of computer memory

== Other uses ==
- Newhaven Marine railway station, Sussex, England (1886–2017)
- Texting shorthand for 'never mind'; see SMS language § Whole word or phrase abbreviation
