= James Hampton (artist) =

American outsider artist (1909–1964)

- Born: April 8, 1909; Elloree, South Carolina, U.S.
- Died: November 4, 1964 (aged 55); Washington, D.C., U.S.
- Resting place: Warren Chapel Baptist Church, Elloree, South Carolina
- Known for: Throne of the Third Heaven of the Nations' Millennium General Assembly
- Style: Outsider art

James Hampton (April 8, 1909 – November 4, 1964) was an American outsider artist. Hampton worked as a janitor and secretly built a large assemblage of religious art from scavenged materials, known as The Throne of the Third Heaven of the Nations' Millennium General Assembly. Often abbreviated to simply The Throne, it is currently on display at the Smithsonian American Art Museum in Washington. Art critic Robert Hughes of Time magazine wrote that The Throne "may well be the finest work of visionary religious art produced by an American."

== Early life ==
James Hampton was born in 1909 in Elloree, South Carolina. His father, who had abandoned the family, was a gospel singer and a traveling Baptist preacher who was also a known criminal who had worked on chain gangs. In 1928, Hampton moved to Washington, D.C. and shared an apartment with his older brother Lee. Hampton worked as a short-order cook until 1943 when he was drafted into the United States Army Air Forces. He served with the 385th Aviation Squadron in Texas, Hawaii and in the jungles of Saipan and Guam. The segregated unit was noncombatant and duties included carpentry and maintenance of airstrips. Hampton built a small, shrine-like object during his time in Guam that he later incorporated into his larger artwork. He was awarded the Bronze Star and was honorably discharged in 1945, after which he returned to Washington. In 1946, Hampton was hired by the General Services Administration as a janitor and worked there until his death.

== Throne of the Third Heaven of the Nations' Millennium General Assembly ==
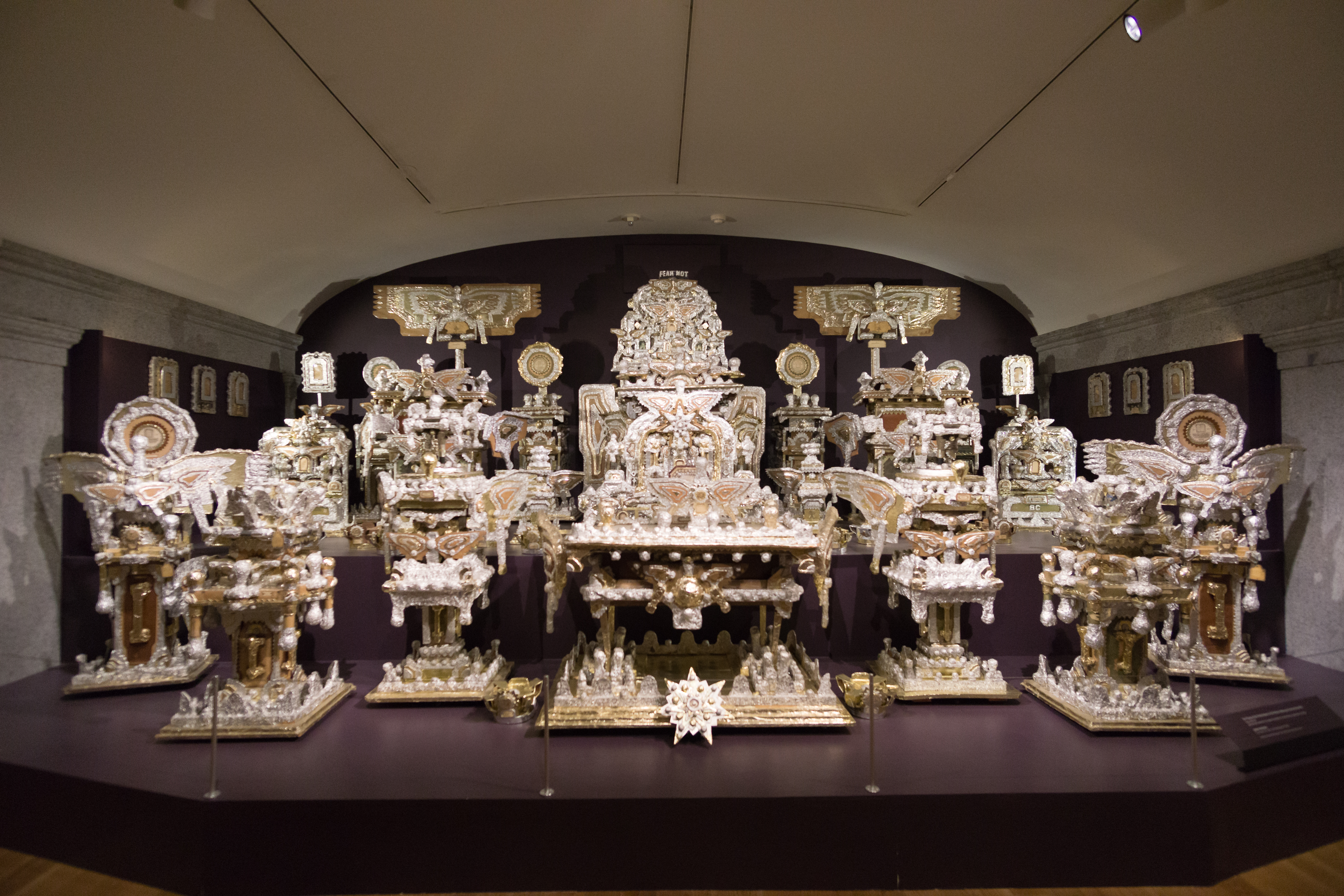
Throne of the Third Heaven of the Nations' Millennium General Assembly in the Smithsonian American Art Museum

In 1950, Hampton rented a garage on 7th street in northwest Washington. Over the next 14 years, Hampton built a complex work of religious art inside the garage with various scavenged materials such as aluminum and gold foil, old furniture, pieces of cardboard, light bulbs, jelly jars, shards of mirror and desk blotters held together with tacks, glue, pins and tape.

The complete work consists of 180 objects, many of them inscribed with quotes from the Book of Revelation. The centerpiece of the exhibit is a throne, seven feet tall, built on the foundation of an old maroon-cushioned armchair with the words "Fear Not" at its crest. The throne is flanked by dozens of altars, crowns, lecterns, tablets and winged pulpits. Wall plaques on the left bear the name of apostles and those on the right list various biblical patriarchs and prophets such as Abraham and Ezekiel. The text The Throne of the Third Heaven of the Nations' Millennium General Assembly was written on the objects in Hampton's handwriting.

Hampton described his work as a monument to Jesus in Washington. It was made based on several religious visions that prompted him to prepare for Christ's return to earth. Hampton wrote that God visited him often, that Moses appeared to him in 1931, the Virgin Mary in 1946, and Adam on the day of Harry S. Truman's inauguration in 1949. The term "third heaven" is based on scriptures that refer to it as the "heaven of heavens" or God's realm.

The work is based on biblical prophecies of the millennium, including St. John's vision of God seated on a silver and gold throne surrounded by angels, references to Judgment Day, the crowns to be worn by the saved and other events described in Revelation. The work also has an affiliation with African-American yard shows as well as altars used in African-derived New World religions such as Vodou, Santería and Candomblé. Art critic Robert Farris Thompson describes The Throne as "a unique fusion of biblical and Afro-American traditional imagery."

The work is associated with the American millenarian and dispensationalist movements of the 19th and 20th centuries. These movements divided the history of God's interactions with humanity into seven phases or dispensations, the last of which would be the "Millennium."

== St. James: The Book of the 7 Dispensation ==
Hampton kept a 108-page loose-leaf notebook titled St James: The Book of the 7 Dispensation. Most of the text was written in an unknown script that remains undeciphered. The text is available online and has been the subject of research.

Hampton altered the seventh dispensation so that he became not only the author of The Book of the 7 Dispensation but also a prophetic counselor of the Millennium. Hampton recorded "the Old and the New Covenant" and a second set of commandments, which Hampton believed God had given to him to pass along because man no longer followed the original Ten Commandments.

Some of the text was accompanied by notes in English in Hampton's handwriting. In the notebook, Hampton referred to himself as St. James with the title "Director, Special Projects for the State of Eternity" and ended each page with the word "Revelation." Hampton had also written texts, some of which refer to religious visions, on various pieces of paper and cardboard and on a few pages in each of seven other notebooks. Tacked to a bulletin board in a corner of the garage was a quotation from Proverbs 29, "Where there is no vision, the people perish."

Hampton also created wall plaques with Roman numerals one through ten and his undecipherable script suggesting commandment-bearing tablets. The largest plaque on the left side of the display contains the text "Nations Readjustment Plan" and is trimmed in gold foil.

Hampton approached local churches about using his creation as a teaching tool but none were interested. Two reporters came to view the display but did not deem it worthy of news coverage. Hampton hoped to develop a storefront ministry but never achieved that goal.

Hampton was somewhat reclusive. He had few close friends and spent most of his personal time working on his shrine. Hampton attended various churches in Washington but never joined a particular congregation because of his belief that the proliferation of denominations contradicted the oneness of God. He expressed an interest in finding a "holy woman" to assist with his life's work but never married.

It is unknown whether Hampton considered himself an artist. Hampton's work is an example of outsider or naïve art – art made by people who are self-taught, who have not studied art techniques, art history or art theory.

== Death and discovery of the display ==
Hampton died of stomach cancer on November 4, 1964, at the Veteran's Hospital in Washington.

The art was not discovered until after Hampton's death in 1964, when the owner of the garage, Meyer Wertlieb, came to find out why the rent had not been paid. He knew that Hampton had been building something in the garage. When he opened the door, he found a room filled with the artwork.

Hampton had kept his project secret from most of his friends and family. His relatives first heard about it when his sister came to claim his body. When Hampton's sister refused to take the artwork, the landlord placed an advertisement in local newspapers. Ed Kelly, a sculptor, answered the advertisement and was so astounded by the exhibit, he contacted art collector Alice Denney. Denney brought art dealers Leo Castelli and Ivan Karp, and artist Robert Rauschenberg, to see the exhibit in the garage. Harry Lowe, the assistant director of the Smithsonian Art Museum, told the Washington Post that walking into the garage "was like opening Tut's tomb."

The story of Hampton and his artwork finally became public in the December 15, 1964 issue of the Washington Post. Lowe paid Hampton's outstanding rent and took possession of the art display. In 1970, Hampton's work was donated to the Smithsonian American Art Museum, where it has been on display ever since.

== In popular culture ==
Author and poet Denis Johnson published a book with the name The Throne of the Third Heaven of the Nations Millennium General Assembly: Poems Collected and New, which includes a poem named after Hampton's work.

In 2007, composer Jefferson Friedman premiered a musical piece inspired by Hampton's artwork titled "The Throne of the Third Heaven," commissioned jointly by the National Symphony Orchestra and the ASCAP Foundation.

The indie music group Le Loup named their 2007 debut album The Throne of the Third Heaven of the Nations' Millennium General Assembly.

In 2015, author Shelley Pearsall published a young adult novel, The Seventh Most Important Thing, which put the artwork and the artist in a fictional context, imagining a meeting between Hampton and a troubled thirteen-year-old boy. The author says she was inspired by the fact that "for more than a decade, Hampton had labored alone, without fanfare, to create art for art's sake – a nearly impossible concept to grasp in today's world of rampant social-media sharing and instant celebrity."

In 2018, Cheyenne/Arapaho author Tommy Orange published a short story, "The State," that references Hampton and The Throne of the Third Heaven of the Nations' Millennium General Assembly. The story was an excerpted chapter from Orange's 2018 novel There There.
