= I Want to Grow Up =

Studio album by Colleen Green
- Released: February 24, 2015
- Studio: July 2014; Sputnik Sound in Nashville, Tennessee
- Genre: Pop punk; indie rock
- Length: 36:46
- Label: Hardly Art
- Producer: Colleen Green; Jake Orrall

Colleen Green chronology
Sock It to Me (2013)	I Want to Grow Up (2015)

I Want to Grow Up is the third studio album by American indie pop musician Colleen Green, released on February 24, 2015 through Hardly Art. The album's title is a play on the Descendents' I Don't Want to Grow Up.

== Background ==
I Want to Grow Up was Green's first album professionally recorded in a studio. The album features Jake Orrall of JEFF The Brotherhood on guitar and Diarrhea Planet's Casey Weissbuch on drums. Green spoke on recording the album in an interview with Stereogum:

I've definitely achieved the sound that I wanted, but it was a lot easier this time because, instead of obsessing over one thing and being by myself and not having anyone to bounce it off of, I would be like, "Hey, what do you think about blank?" It was just more collaborative, and it took a lot of pressure and stress off of me.

== Critical reception ==
Professional ratings
Review scores
Source	Rating
Allmusic	3.5/5 stars
Consequence of Sound	B
NME	7/10
Pitchfork	7.4/10
Rolling Stone	3/5 stars
Spin	8/10

I Want to Grow Up received positive reviews. Pitchfork's Jes Skolnik praised Green's "elegantly wry, acerbic, hooky pop style. Her blasé delivery might seem impenetrable at first, but there is warmth and wit to her work that rewards those who are patient enough to hear its message." Tim Sendra of Allmusic dubbed it a "nice progression from her debut," complimenting its "really good pop songs that'll have you singing along after the first spin." Spin's Dan Weiss wrote that "I Want to Grow Up involves aspirations rather than answers, and thus little is resolved of the album’s many inner conflicts. Only the sweet-and-sour music they’re set to offers any kind of relief." Nick Freed, writing for Consequence of Sound, described the album as an "exploration of a day in the life of a 30-year-old with an infectious punk rock soundtrack." Rob Sheffield at Rolling Stone compared the album's sound to Juliana Hatfield and the Muffs. Noel Gardner of NME wrote that "While I Want To Grow Up doesn’t exactly break new ground, it compensates by being affecting, relatable and having occasional gnarly solos."

Ben Ratliff at The New York Times wrote that "Around her songs, there is a basic air of competence, toughness, self-reliance — she's organized her sound, has identified her neuroses and doesn't need your help."

=== Accolades ===
Year	Publication	Country	Rank	List
2015	Spin	U.S.	31	The 50 Best Albums of 2015
2015	Stereogum	U.S.	8	The 50 Best Albums of 2015

== Track listing ==
All songs written by Colleen Green.

No.	Title	Length
1.	"I Want to Grow Up"	3:43
2.	"Wild One"	3:15
3.	"TV"	3:10
4.	"Pay Attention"	2:46
5.	"Deeper Than Love"	6:05
6.	"Things That Are Bad for Me (Part I)"	3:02
7.	"Things That Are Bad for Me (Part II)"	4:06
8.	"Some People"	3:06
9.	"Grind My Teeth"	3:42
10.	"Whatever I Want"	3:57
Total length:		36:46

== Personnel ==
Information adapted from the album's liner notes.

Musicians

- Colleen Green – guitar, vocals, production, recording, mixing engineer on "Deeper Than Love", art concept
- Jake Orrall – bass guitar, synthesizer, harmonium, guitar, production
- Casey Weissbuch – percussion

Production

- Vance Powell – recorded by, mixing engineer
- Eddie Spear – recording and mixing assistant
- KRAMER – mastering engineer
- Sarah Moody – layout and design
- Eric Penna – cover photo

== Chart performance ==
I Want to Grow Up charted on the U.S. Top Heatseekers Albums chart for the week of March 14, 2015, at position 22.

=== Weekly charts ===
Chart (2015)	Peak position
US Heatseekers Albums (Billboard)	22
