= The Throne of the Third Heaven of the Nations' Millennium General Assembly (album) =

Studio album by Le Loup
- Released: 11 September 2007
- Genre: Indie
- Length: 32:07
- Label: Hardly Art

Le Loup chronology
The Throne of the Third Heaven of the Nations' Millennium General Assembly (2007)	Family (2009)

Professional ratings
Review scores
Source	Rating
AllMusic	3.5/5 stars
MusicOMH	3.5/5 stars
Pitchfork Media	(7.3/10)
Twisted Ear	2.5/5 stars

The Throne of the Third Heaven of the Nations' Millennium General Assembly is the debut album by indie band Le Loup. It was released on September 11, 2007. It is named after the eponymous artwork by outsider artist James Hampton.

== Track listing ==
All songs composed by Sam Simkoff except as noted.

1. "Canto I" (Bryan Oemler, Simkoff) – 2:38
2. "Planes Like Vultures." – 3:04
3. "Outside of This Car, the End of the World!" – 2:54
4. "To the Stars! To the Night!" – 3:14
5. "(storm)" (Christian Ervin) – 2:13
6. "We Are Gods! We Are Wolves!" – 3:17
7. "Breathing Rapture" – 2:54
8. "Look to the West." – 2:51
9. "(howl)" (Ervin, Simkoff) – 1:01
10. "Le Loup (Fear Not)" – 4:14
11. "Canto XXXVI" (Ervin, Simkoff) – 3:47
12. "I Had a Dream I Died." (Ervin, Simkoff) – 7:20

== Personnel ==
- Sam Simkoff – keyboard, banjo
- Christian Ervin – computer
- Michael Ferguson – guitar
- Robert Sahm – drums
- Jim Thomson – guitar
