= Adiós I'm a Ghost =

Studio album by the Moondoggies
- Released: August 13, 2013
- Genre: Rock
- Length: 43:35
- Label: Hardly Art
- Producer: Ryan Hadlock

The Moondoggies chronology
Tidelands (2010)	Adiós I'm a Ghost (2013)

Professional ratings
Aggregate scores
Source	Rating
Metacritic	68/100
Review scores
Source	Rating
AllMusic	3.5/5 stars
PopMatters	6/10

Adiós I'm a Ghost is the third studio album from American rock band the Moondoggies. It was released in August 2013 in Hardly Art.

== Track listing ==
No.	Title	Length
1.	"I'm A Ghost"	0:23
2.	"Red Eye"	2:08
3.	"Annie Turn Out The Lights"	3:36
4.	"Midnight Owls"	5:47
5.	"Pride"	2:33
6.	"A Lot to Give"	5:59
7.	"Stop Signs"	4:34
8.	"Start Me Over"	2:55
9.	"One More Chance"	4:18
10.	"Back to the Beginning"	4:29
11.	"Don't Ask Why"	6:25
12.	"Adiós I'm a Ghost"	0:28
