= Pitchfork Music Festival 2009 =

Music festival

- Dates: July 17–19, 2009
- Locations: Union Park, Chicago, United States
- Website: pitchforkmusicfestival.com

The Pitchfork Music Festival 2009 was held on July 17 to 19, 2009 at the Union Park, Chicago, United States.

In 2009, the festival initiated a program called Write the Night, which all of the performing bands on Friday night played sets consisting of songs voted for online by ticket-holders.

== Lineup ==
Artists listed from latest to earliest set times.

Aluminum Stage
Friday, July 17	Saturday, July 18	Sunday, July 19
Built to Spill; Yo La Tengo	The National; DOOM; Final Fantasy; Fucked Up; Cymbals Eat Guitars	The Flaming Lips; M83; The Thermals; Blitzen Trapper; The Mae Shi

Connector Stage
Friday, July 17	Saturday, July 18	Sunday, July 19
The Jesus Lizard; Tortoise	Beirut; Yeasayer; The Pains of Being Pure at Heart; Plants and Animals	Grizzly Bear; The Walkmen; Pharoahe Monch; Frightened Rabbit

Balance Stage
Saturday, July 18	Sunday, July 19
The Black Lips; Matt and Kim; Lindstrøm; Wavves; Ponytail; Bowerbirds; The Antlers; The Dutchess and the Duke; Disappears	The Very Best; Mew; Vivian Girls; Japandroids; DJ /rupture Women; The Killer Whales; Dianogah; Michael Columbia
