= Time to Go Home =

2015 studio album by Chastity Belt

Studio album by Chastity Belt
- Released: March 23, 2015
- Genre: Punk rock
- Length: 38:17
- Label: Hardly Art
- Producer: Nich Wilbur, José Díaz Rohena

Chastity Belt chronology
| No Regerts (2013) | Time to Go Home (2015) | I Used to Spend So Much Time Alone (2017) |

Time to Go Home is the second studio album by American indie rock band Chastity Belt. It was released on March 23, 2015, by Hardly Art.

== Music and lyrics ==
The album opens with the track "Drone". A line from Sheila Heti's How Should a Person Be?, "He’s just another man who wants to teach me something", appears in the chorus of the song. The song handles the subject of feminism. The second track is "Trapped" and "Why Try" is the third. Musically, both are surf rock tracks. The album's fourth track is "Cool Slut". The song's lyrics are about sex-positive attitudes. "On the Floor" is the fifth track. Its lyrics about the feelings of post-college displacement. The sixth track is "The Thing". Musically, it is the only hard rock track of the album. "Joke" is the seventh track. Its lyrics are about wanting to start fires. The eight track is "Lydia". Musically, it is a punk rock song. "IDC" is the ninth track. The album closes with the title track and the lead single, "Time to Go Home". The band told The Fader "'Time to go Home' is about treating boredom with substances. It's about having too much free time, feeling bored, getting a little drunk, wanting more, getting completely trashed, feeling euphoric, feeling sick, and finally having a sudden and urgent need to go home and go to bed."

== Critical reception ==
Professional ratings
Aggregate scores
| Source | Rating |
|---|---|
| Metacritic | 78/100 |
Review scores
| Source | Rating |
| AllMusic | 4/5 stars |
| Drowned in Sound | 8/10 |
| Exclaim! | 8/10 |
| Pitchfork | 7.6/10 |
| PopMatters | 5/10 stars |
| Robert Christgau | (2-star Honorable Mention) |
| Spin | 8/10 |

The album received generally positive reviews from critics. On Metacritic, which assigns a normalized rating out of 100 to reviews from mainstream critics, the album has received a score of 78. Fred Thomas of AllMusic gave the album four out of five stars, remarking it "Time to Go Home takes the band's unique blend of beauty and absurdity into slightly different places." A mixed review came from Devon Fisher of PopMatters, who said the album "sounds more like it came out of the ‘90s than any of Sub Pop’s still-active groups that were putting out records back then." He also felt it "seems like half the album it could have been." Bryn Lovitt of Spin gave the album eight out of ten stars and wrote, "Time to Go Home is a throwback to mid-’80s darkwave that gives it an intellectual edge for its resemblance to such a specific moment in classic British new wave."

== Track listing ==
All tracks written by Julia Shapiro, except "Lydia" written by Lydia Lund. All tracks produced by Nich Wilbur and José Díaz Rohena.

| No. | Title | Length |
|---|---|---|
| 1. | "Drone" | 4:33 |
| 2. | "Trapped" | 3:32 |
| 3. | "Why Try" | 2:40 |
| 4. | "Cool Slut" | 2:51 |
| 5. | "On the Floor" | 6:05 |
| 6. | "The Thing" | 2:18 |
| 7. | "Joke" | 5:32 |
| 8. | "Lydia" | 3:59 |
| 9. | "IDC" | 2:57 |
| 10. | "Time to Go Home" | 3:50 |
| Total length: | | 38:17 |
