= Manzanita (Shana Cleveland album) =

Studio album by Shana Cleveland
- Released: March 10, 2023
- Genre: Psych-folk; pop; gothic folk
- Length: 37:19
- Label: Hardly Art
- Producer: Shana Cleveland

Shana Cleveland chronology
| Night of the Worm Moon (2019) | Manzanita (2023) |

Manzanita is the third studio album by American musician Shana Cleveland, released on March 10, 2023, through Hardly Art. Cleveland wrote the album while pregnant, which altered the topics in her lyrics. It received acclaim from critics.

== Background ==
Cleveland wrote most of the material while pregnant with her son, Ozzy, and stated that she felt "becoming a mother resulted in a completely new terrain of emotions" that she wrote the lyrics around. She also said: "You're not going to dance to the songs on Manzanita. You will go on a journey in your mind, if you're feeling comfortable."

== Critical reception ==
Professional ratings
Aggregate scores
| Source | Rating |
|---|---|
| Metacritic | 90/100 |
Review scores
| Source | Rating |
| AllMusic | 4/5 stars |
| Clash | 8/10 |
| The Guardian | 5/5 stars |
| Mojo | 4/5 stars |
| Uncut | 9/10 |

Manzanita received a score of 90 out of 100 on review aggregator Metacritic based on five critics' reviews, indicating "universal acclaim". Fred Thomas of AllMusic called the album "some of [Cleveland's] most low-key and slowly blooming material to date, fleshing out softly flickering folk tunes with understated orchestral arrangements" and "as much an atmosphere as it is an artistic statement, casting a friendly-if-stormy spell on the listener for its 14-track duration and then fading into the mist". Reviewing the album for The Guardian, Michael Hann summed it as up "baroque psychedelia mingles with west coast pop and gothic folk", further describing it as "utterly transfixing – not just for the gorgeousness of the tone, but for the absolute wondrousness of the melodies".

Robin Murray of Clash stated that the album has "a stunning, other-worldly charm" and is "laden with surprises", summarizing it as "a lush yet spartan song cycle that moves from lysergic folk to baroque aspects, all held together by West Coast sunsets and the lingering touch of her family". Mojo felt that "Manzanita mostly shimmers obliquely with light and spells", while Uncut stated that "though Cleveland's delivery is generally far more subdued, Manzanita shares a similarly transportative, anciently psychedelic feel with The Incredible String Band's magical '60s work".

== Track listing ==
All tracks are written by Shana Cleveland.

Manzanita track listing
| No. | Title | Length |
|---|---|---|
| 1. | "A Ghost" | 2:51 |
| 2. | "Bloom" | 0:11 |
| 3. | "Faces in the Firelight" | 3:36 |
| 4. | "Mystic Mine" | 3:55 |
| 5. | "Light on the Water" | 0:39 |
| 6. | "Quick Winter Sun" | 2:52 |
| 7. | "Bonanza Freeze" | 2:16 |
| 8. | "Gold Tower" | 3:30 |
| 9. | "Babe" | 2:36 |
| 10. | "Ten Hour Drive Through West Coast Disaster" | 1:24 |
| 11. | "Evil Eye" | 3:28 |
| 12. | "Mayonnaise" | 2:57 |
| 13. | "Sheriff of the Salton Sea" | 2:58 |
| 14. | "Walking Through Morning Dew" | 4:06 |
| Total length: | | 37:19 |
