= Chastity Belt (album) =

Studio album by Chastity Belt
- Released: September 20, 2019
- Length: 42:57
- Label: Hardly Art

Chastity Belt chronology
I Used to Spend So Much Time Alone (2017)	Chastity Belt (2019)	Live Laugh Love (2024)

Singles from Chastity Belt
- 1. "Ann's Jam" Released: July 10, 2019

Professional ratings
Aggregate scores
Source	Rating
AnyDecentMusic?	7.3/10
Metacritic	77/100
Review scores
Source	Rating
AllMusic	4/5 stars
Clash Magazine	8/10
Exclaim!	8/10

Chastity Belt is the fourth studio album by American band Chastity Belt. It was released September 20, 2019 under Hardly Art.

== Critical reception ==
Chastity Belt was met with generally favorable reviews from critics. At Metacritic, which assigns a weighted average rating out of 100 to reviews from mainstream publications, this release received an average score of 77, based on 10 reviews.

== Track listing ==
Chastity Belt track listing
No.	Title	Length
1.	"Ann's Jam"	4:56
2.	"Elena"	3:20
3.	"Effort"	5:07
4.	"Rav-4"	3:39
5.	"It Takes Time"	4:04
6.	"Apart"	3:33
7.	"Half-Hearted"	5:25
8.	"Split"	3:53
9.	"Drown"	4:06
10.	"Pissed Pants"	4:54

== Personnel ==
Chastity Belt

- Julia Shapiro — guitar (tracks 1, 2, 4, 5, 7–10), vocals (tracks 1, 2, 4, 5, 7, 9, 10), drums (tracks 3, 6), keyboards (tracks 8, 9)
- Lydia Lund — guitar; vocals (tracks 6, 8)
- Annie Truscott — bass; violin (tracks 4, 6–9)
- Gretchen Grimm — drums (tracks 1, 2, 4, 5, 7–10), vocals (tracks 3, 6), guitar (tracks 3, 6)

Additional Personnel

- Melina Duterte — trumpet (track 1)
- Jessica Kitzmann — cello (tracks 3, 10)
