= Floating Features =

Studio album by La Luz
- Released: May 11, 2018
- Length: 35:42
- Label: Hardly Art
- Producer: Dan Auerbach

La Luz chronology
| Weirdo Shrine (2015) | Floating Features (2018) | La Luz (2021) |

Professional ratings
Aggregate scores
| Source | Rating |
|---|---|
| Metacritic | 75/100 |
Review scores
| Source | Rating |
| AllMusic | 3.5/5 stars |
| DIY | 3/5 stars |
| Exclaim! | 9/10 |
| Flood Magazine | 7/10 |
| Loud and Quiet | 7/10 |
| Paste | 7.9/10 |

Floating Features is the third studio album by American band La Luz. It was released on May 11, 2018 under Hardly Art.

== Critical reception ==
Floating Features was met with "generally favorable" reviews from critics. At Metacritic, which assigns a weighted average rating out of 100 to reviews from mainstream publications, this release received an average score of 75, based on 9 reviews. Aggregator Album of the Year gave the release a 77 out of 100 based on a critical consensus of 10 reviews.

=== Accolades ===
Accolades for Floating Features
| Publication | Accolade | Rank |
|---|---|---|
| Bandcamp | Bandcamp's Top 100 Albums of 2018 | 4 |
| Flavorwire | Flavorwire's Top 25 Albums of 2018 | 23 |
| Loud and Quiet | Loud and Quiet's Top 40 Albums of 2018 | 38 |
| Louder Than War | Louder Than War's Top 78 Albums of 2018 | 16 |
| Passion of the Weiss | Passion of the Weiss' Top 50 Albums of 2018 | 14 |

== Track listing ==
Floating Features track listing
| No. | Title | Length |
|---|---|---|
| 1. | "Floating Features" | 2:13 |
| 2. | "Cicada" | 3:11 |
| 3. | "Loose Teeth" | 2:47 |
| 4. | "Mean Dream" | 3:34 |
| 5. | "California Finally" | 3:21 |
| 6. | "The Creature" | 3:28 |
| 7. | "My Golden One" | 4:14 |
| 8. | "Lonely Dozer" | 3:15 |
| 9. | "Greed Machine" | 4:19 |
| 10. | "Walking Into the Sun" | 2:45 |
| 11. | "Don't Leave Me on the Earth" | 2:35 |

== Charts ==
Chart performance for Floating Features
| Chart (2018) | Peak position |
|---|---|
| UK Independent Albums (Official Charts) | 33 |

== Personnel ==
Musicians

- Shana Cleveland – lead vocals, guitar
- Alice Sandahl – keyboard
- Lena Simon – bass
- Marian Li Pino – drums, backing vocals

Production

- Dan Auerbach – producer
- M. Allen Parker – mixing
- Richard Dodd – mastering
- Vikesh Kapoor – cover photo
- Lauren Cordon – cover art
