= Chastity Belt (band) =

American rock band

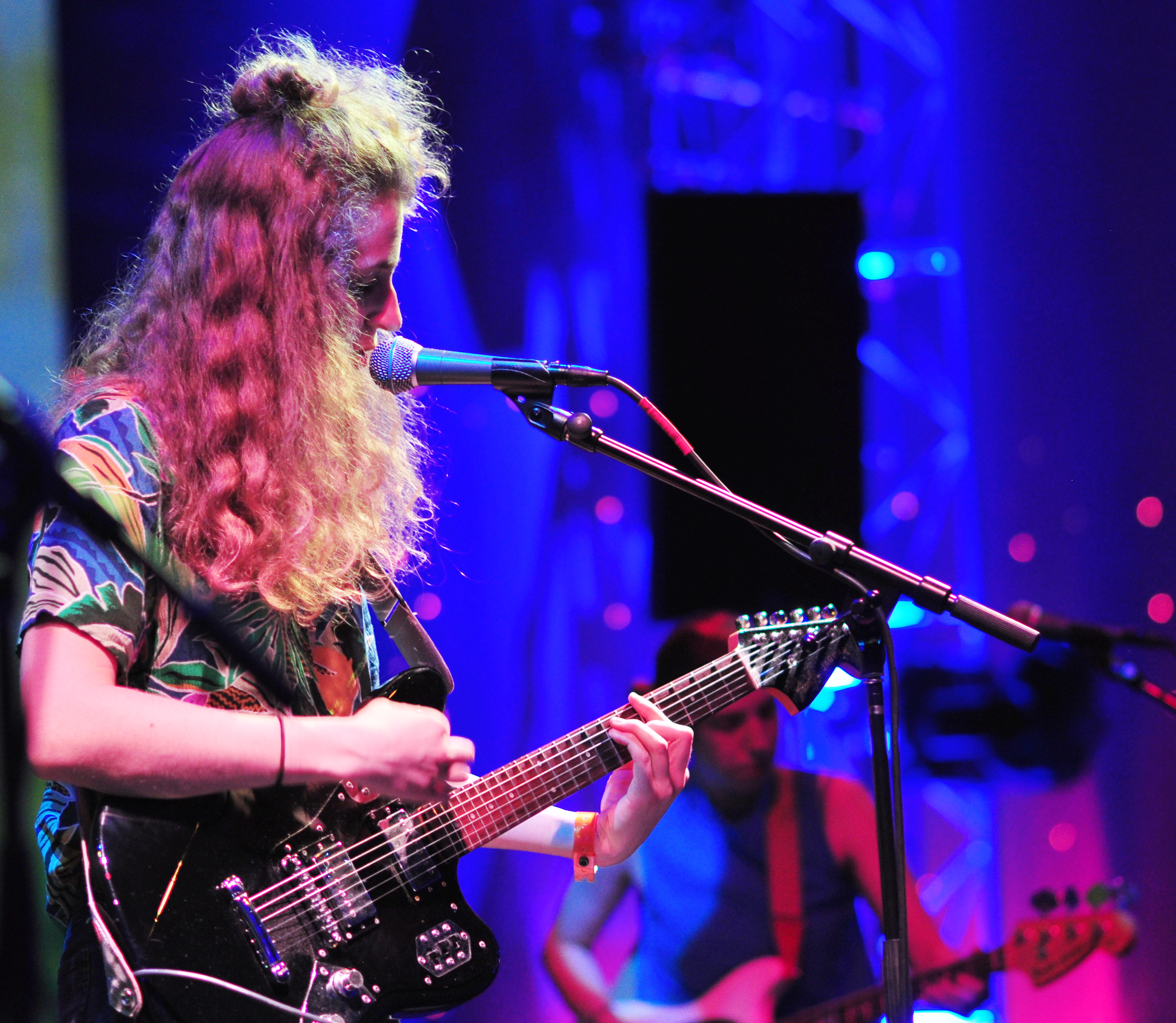
- Chastity Belt in 2015

Background information
- Origin: Walla Walla, Washington
- Genres: Pop-punk, alternative rock, rock and roll, noise pop, indie rock, indie pop, pop rock
- Years active: 2010–present
- Label: Hardly Art
- Members: Julia Shapiro; Lydia Lund; Hunter Truscott; Gretchen Grimm
- Website: facebook.com/chastitybeltmusic

Chastity Belt is an American rock band formed in Walla Walla, Washington, in 2010. The band consists of Julia Shapiro, Lydia Lund, Hunter Truscott, and Gretchen Grimm, and plays a style of alternative rock, rock and roll, noise pop, and pop rock. The group have released five studio albums: No Regerts (2013), Time to Go Home (2015), I Used to Spend So Much Time Alone (2017), Chastity Belt (2019) and Live Laugh Love (2024).

== History ==
Chastity Belt was formed in Walla Walla, Washington, during 2010 while its members were students at Whitman College. Childbirth frontwoman Julia Shapiro became the band's lead vocalist and guitarist, with fellow lead guitarist Lydia Lund, bassist Hunter Truscott, and drummer Gretchen Grimm. They take a humorous approach to feminine stereotypes and customs in their lyrics, challenging gender norms and femininity as a construct.

Following the EPs Fuck Chastity Belt and Dude (a collaboration with Dude York) in 2012, the group released its debut studio album No Regerts on August 13, 2013, on Help Yourself Records. The band's second studio album, Time to Go Home, was released on March 24, 2015, on Hardly Art. It received a positive reception from music critics.

The band's third studio album, I Used to Spend So Much Time Alone, was released on June 2, 2017, also on Hardly Art. The album received significant praise from NPR's Mike Katzif, who wrote, "I Used To Spend So Much Time Alone is a thoughtful, reflective album, constantly searching for direction to and questioning every solitary, restless feeling, yet it's that intimacy that allows us to know a new, perhaps truer side to the artists. It takes an extraordinary amount of self-confidence to expose that process for all to hear."

After a brief hiatus in 2018, the group announced on July 10, 2019, that its fourth LP would be self-titled as Chastity Belt, and would be released on September 20. The single "Ann's Jam" was released along with the announcement. Writing for The Fader, Alex Robert Ross called it "the indie four-piece's lushest and most mournful-sounding album yet." Upon its release, Pitchfork's Abby Jones described the album as "their dreamiest and most tranquil." The group went on a tour as direct support for the rock musician Kurt Vile in 2021.

== Members ==
Current members

- Julia Shapiro – lead vocals, rhythm guitar
- Lydia Lund – lead guitar
- Hunter Truscott – bass
- Gretchen Grimm – drums

== Discography ==
Studio albums

- No Regerts (August 13, 2013, Help Yourself)
- Time to Go Home (March 24, 2015, Hardly Art)
- I Used to Spend So Much Time Alone (June 2, 2017, Hardly Art)
- Chastity Belt (September 20, 2019, Hardly Art)
- Live Laugh Love (March 29, 2024, Suicide Squeeze)
- All My Friends (November 6th, 2026, Suicide Squeeze)
