= Versing =

American indie rock group

- Origin: Tacoma, Washington
- Genres: Alternative rock, Indie rock, Shoegaze
- Years active: 2015–present
- Labels: Decency Den Records, Friends & Family, Youth Riot Records, Hardly Art
- Members: Daniel Salas; Graham Baker; Kirby Lochner; Max Keyes

Versing are an indie rock group from Tacoma, Washington, later residing in Seattle. They have released two albums and an LP.

== History ==
The group met at KUPS, the student radio station at the University of Puget Sound in Tacoma. The initial lineup was Daniel Salas on guitar and vocals, Graham Baker on guitar, and Max Keyes on drums. Six months later, Kirby Lochner joined on bass guitar. Lochner had previously played bass in Sun Eater, a stoner metal band for which Salas had played drums.

Versing debuted in 2016 with the EP Nude Descending, released on Youth Riot Records. The title was inspired by Marcel Duchamp's painting Nude Descending a Staircase and by the comic strip Calvin and Hobbes, which had made several references to the painting.

The band's first full-length album, Nirvana, was released in 2017 on Decency Den Records. The same year, they toured with Vancouver, BC indie rock group The Courtneys.

In 2018, Versing signed with Sub Pop subsidiary Hardly Art and released their second LP, 10,000 the following year.

== Discography ==
=== Albums ===
- Nirvana
- 10,0000

== Singles and EPs ==
- "Haunted Houses"
- Nude Descending
