= Weirdo Shrine =

Studio album by La Luz
- Released: August 7, 2015
- Genres: Surf rock; doo-wop; lo-fi; rock and roll
- Length: 31:21
- Label: Hardly Art
- Producer: Ty Segall

La Luz chronology
It's Alive (2013)	Weirdo Shrine (2015)	Floating Features (2018)

Weirdo Shrine is a studio album by American surf rock band La Luz. It was released on August 7, 2015.

== Composition ==
Weirdo Shrine digs into "classic-sounding" surf rock, yielding a "dark spin" on the genre. Doo-wop and "top-notch" rock and roll are also present.

The album's production is lo-fi and "fuzz-heavy".

== Critical reception ==
Professional ratings
Aggregate scores
Source	Rating
Metacritic	77/100
Review scores
Source	Rating
AllMusic	3.5/5 stars
Consequence	B+
Exclaim!	8/10
Paste	8.3/10
Pitchfork	7.1/10
PopMatters	6/10

== Track listing ==
1. "Sleep Till They Die (Health, Life and Fire)" – 3:19
2. "You Disappear" – 3:22
3. "With Davey" – 2:17
4. "Don't Wanna Be Anywhere" – 3:00
5. "I Can't Speak" – 3:03
6. "Hey Papi" – 1:46
7. "I Wanna Be Alone (With You)" – 2:16
8. "I'll Be True" – 3:28
9. "Black Hole, Weirdo Shrine" – 3:04
10. "Oranges" – 2:10
11. "True Love Knows" – 3:36

== Personnel ==
Credits adapted from AllMusic.

La Luz

- Shana Cleveland - lead vocals, guitar
- Alice Sandahl - keyboard
- Lena Simon - bass
- Marian Li Pino - drums
