= Colleen Green =

American musician (born 1984)

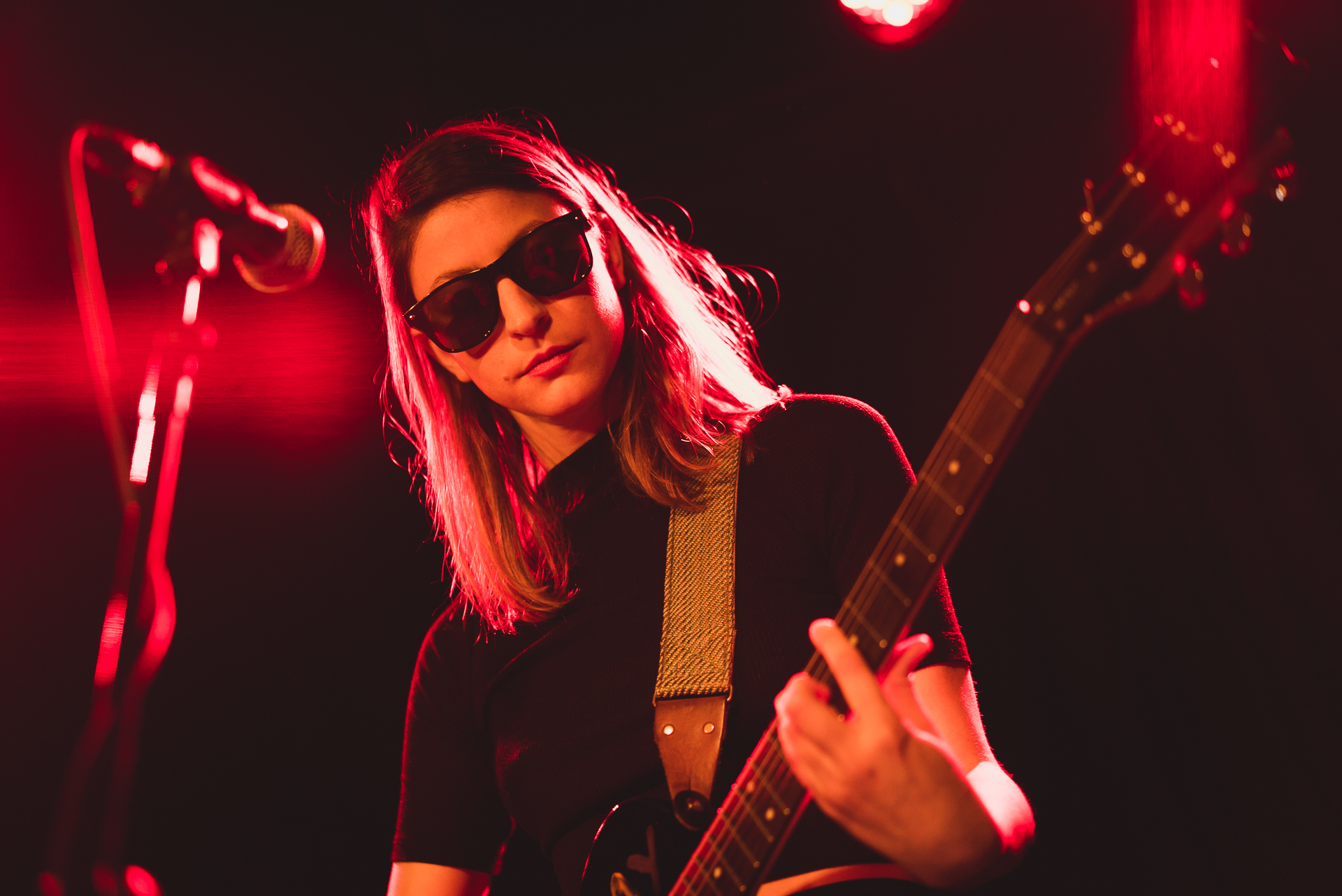
- Colleen Green at The Lexington in London in 2018

Background information
- Born: October 23, 1984 (age 42); Dunstable, Massachusetts, U.S.
- Origin: Los Angeles, California, U.S.
- Genres: Indie pop, lo-fi, noise pop, pop punk
- Years active: 2010–present
- Label: Hardly Art
- Website: colleengreen.bandcamp.com

Colleen Green (born October 23, 1984) is an American indie pop musician from Los Angeles, California. She is currently signed to Hardly Art Records.

== Career ==
Green released her first album, Milo Goes to Compton, in 2011, through Art Fag; it was originally released as a cassette tape. Her sophomore release, Sock It To Me, came out in 2013, now through Hardly Art. Green's third album, I Want to Grow Up, her first release to be recorded with a band in a studio, was released on February 24, 2015 to widespread critical acclaim. "I Want to Grow Up" is her most commercially successful album to date as well. In 2021 she announced "Cool", her fourth album via Hardly Art.

In September 2015 Green was voted Best Solo Artist by the readers of LA Weekly. Her song "Wild One" was featured on the Netflix series Love.

Green has toured almost all continents. She has played concerts in Mexico, Brazil, Chile, Japan, Canada, The United States, and Australia, as well as several countries in Europe, such as England, France, Germany, Scotland, and Belgium.

Green hand draws her merchandising and tour posters.

== Discography ==
=== Studio albums ===
List of albums, with selected details
Title	Album details
Milo Goes to Compton	Released: 2011; Formats: LP, cassette; Label: Art Fag
Sock It to Me	Released: March 19, 2013; Formats: LP, CD, digital download; Label: Hardly Art
I Want to Grow Up	Released: February 24, 2015; Formats: LP, CD, digital download; Label: Hardly Art
Casey's Tape / Harmontown Loops	Released: September 7, 2018; Formats: LP, CD, digital download; Label: Infinity Cat Recordings
Cool	Released: September 10, 2021; Formats: LP, CD, Digital; Label: Hardly Art

=== Extended plays ===
List of albums, with selected details
Title	Album details
Milo Goes to Compton	Released: January 2010 (original) February 21, 2012; Formats: 7", digital download; Label: Self-released (original) Art Fag
Green One	Released: March 1, 2011; Formats: 7", digital download; Label: Hardly Art
Cujo	Released: October 4, 2011; Formats: 12", digital download; Label: Art Fag
4 Loko 2 Kayla	Released: July 2014; Formats: CD-R; Label: Philthy Phonographic Records
Colleen Green	Released: May 13, 2016; Formats: Cassette, digital download; Label: Infinity Cat Recordings
