= Youbet =

American indie rock band

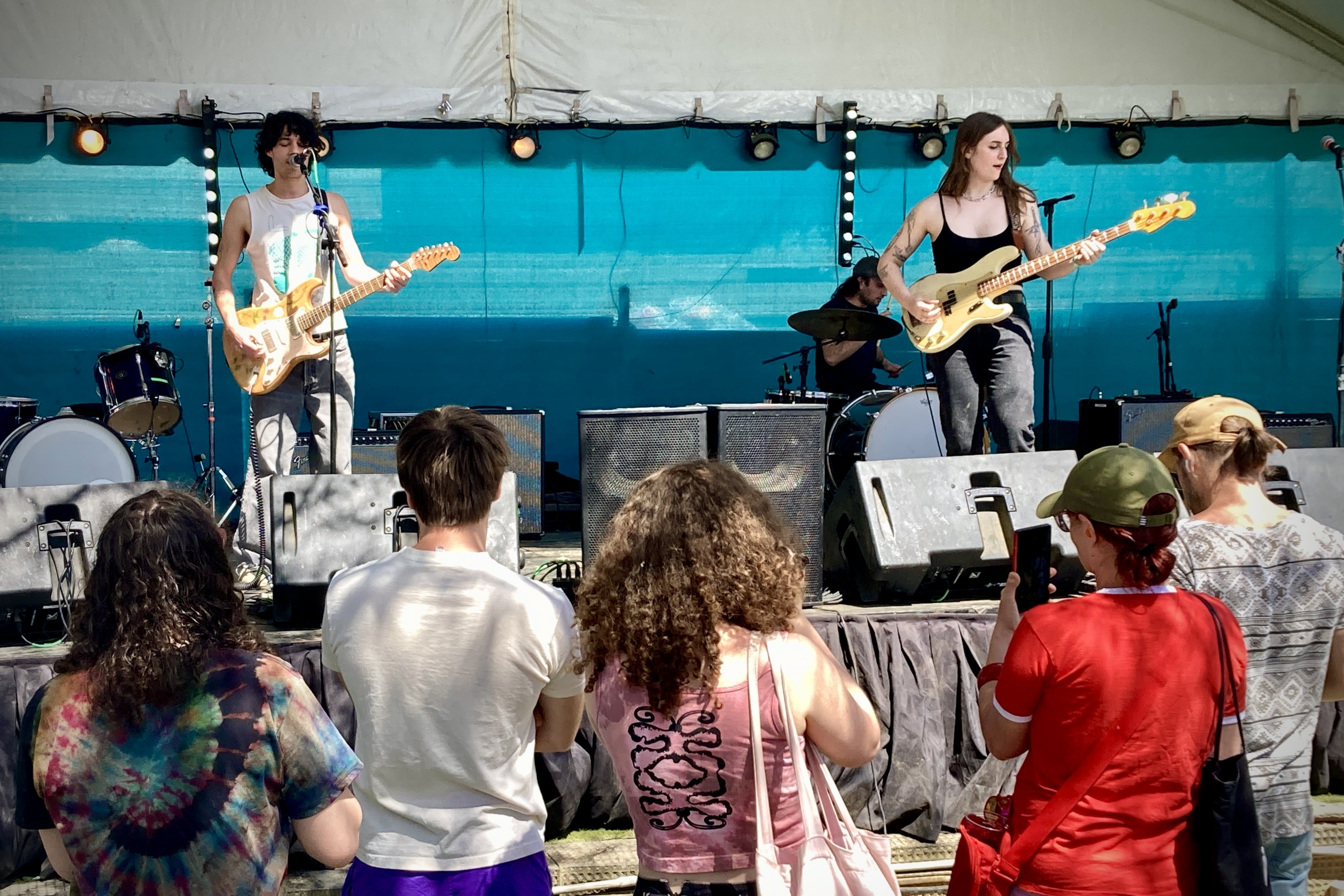
- Youbet performing at SXSW, 2025

Background information
- Origin: New York City
- Genres: indie rock; folk rock; alternative music
- Years active: 2018–present
- Labels: Ba Da Bing Records; Hardly Art
- Members: Nick Llobet; Micah Prussack

Youbet (stylized in all lowercase) is an American indie rock band fronted by Nick Llobet. The band is based in New York City, and also includes bassist Micah Prussack. The band has released three full-length albums. The first, Compare and Despair, was released on January 31, 2020. In November 2023, youbet signed to Hardly Art and released a new song called "Carsick". On May 10, 2024, the band released their second album, Way to Be. Prior to the album's release, the band released the songs "Seeds of Evil", "Nurture", and "Vacancy". The band released a self-titled album on May 1, 2026, which received a 7.5 score on Pitchfork.

== Discography ==
=== Studio albums ===
- Compare and Despair (2020), Ba Da Bing Records
- Way to Be (2024), Hardly Art
- youbet (2026), Hardly Art
