= The Moondoggies =

American rock band

- Origin: Everett, Washington, U.S.
- Genre: Rock
- Years active: 2005–present
- Label: Hardly Art
- Members: Kevin Murphy, Carl Dahlen, Jon Pontrello, Caleb Quick
- Past members: Robert Terreberry

The Moondoggies is an American rock band from Everett, Washington, United States. Formed in 2005 by Kevin Murphy (guitar, vocals), Caleb Quick (keyboards, vocals), Carl Dahlen (drums, vocals), and Robert Terreberry (bass, vocals). They have been described as "seriously kick-ass" by Austin Scaggs of Rolling Stone. The band has released four albums and one EP on Hardly Art, an imprint of Sub Pop Records.

The Moondoggies have toured with such bands as Dawes, Blitzen Trapper, Quiet life, Rose Windows, The Cave Singers, The Dutchess and the Duke, The Romney Rye and The Head and the Heart.

== History ==
While attending Cascade High School in Everett Washington, Kevin Murphy started a punk rock outfit called the Familiars with drummer Jon Pontrello, bassist David Brown (later replaced by Robert Terreberry), and singer Jon Parks. The group gained a small following playing around Seattle while still in their late teens. Shortly before the band dissolved, Murphy began collaborating and writing with Caleb Quick. The two began performing live while living in Bellingham, Washington. Murphy lived briefly in Ketchikan, Alaska before returning to Everett and starting The Moondoggies with the songs he wrote in Alaska. Drummer Carl Dahlen had no previous drum training before joining the band. The band released their debut album Don't Be A Stranger on August 19, 2008. The album received favorable reviews from NPR Music, KEXP, and Aquarium Drunkard.

In November 2009 the band began recording their sophomore album Tidelands with producer Erik Blood. Phil Ek, notable for his albums with the Fleet Foxes, Modest Mouse, and Built To Spill, came on board to help mix as well as produce the first single "Empress of the North".

In October 2010, the band was featured as Relix Magazine's "On The Verge" artist.

On December 7, 2010, their single "What Took So Long" was NPR Music's "Song of the Day".

In January 2011, longtime friend, collaborator, and multi-instrumentalist Jon Pontrello officially joined the group.

On August 13, 2013, the band released their third album, Adiós I'm a Ghost, Recorded at Bear Creek Studios with Ryan Hadlock.

In 2018 shortly after the release of A Love Sleeps Deep, (recorded with Erik Blood) Murphy parted ways with founding member Robert Terreberry.

The band released their 5th studio album “Moondoggies” on October 26th 2026 Produced by Erik Blood.

The Moondoggies have toured with such bands as Dawes, Blitzen Trapper, Quiet life, Rose Windows, The Cave Singers, The Dutchess and the Duke, The Romeny Rye and The Head and the Heart.

== Discography ==
=== Albums ===
- Don't Be A Stranger (Hardly Art, 2008)
- Tidelands (Hardly Art, 2010)
- Adiós I'm a Ghost (Hardly Art, 2013)
- A Love Sleeps Deep (Hardly Art, 2018)
- The Moondoggies (2026)

=== EP ===
You'll Find No Answers Here (Hardly Art, 2010)
