= This Mess Is a Place =

This Mess is a Place

Studio album by Tacocat
- Released: May 3, 2019
- Label: Sub Pop

Tacocat chronology
Lost Time (2016)	This Mess is a Place (2019)

Professional ratings
Aggregate scores
Source	Rating
Metacritic	76/100
Review scores
Source	Rating
AllMusic	4/5 stars
DIY	3.5/5 stars
Mojo	3/5 stars
Pitchfork	6.9/10
Robert Christgau	(2-star Honorable Mention)

This Mess is a Place is the fourth studio album by American band Tacocat. It was released on May 3, 2019, under Sub Pop Records.

Tacocat announced a European tour to promote the album, starting in August 2019.

== Critical reception ==
This Mess is a Place received generally favorable reviews from contemporary music critics. At Metacritic, which assigns a normalized rating out of 100 to reviews from mainstream critics, the album received an average score of 76, based on 8 reviews.

== Track listing ==
No.	Title	Length
1.	"Hologram"	3:46
2.	"New World"	2:55
3.	"Grains of Salt"	3:54
4.	"The Joke of Life"	3:19
5.	"Little Friend"	3:18
6.	"Rose-Colored Sky"	3:51
7.	"The Problem"	2:18
8.	"Crystal Ball"	3:33
9.	"Meet Me at la Palma"	2:38
10.	"Miles and Miles"	2:53

== Charts ==
Chart	Peak position
US Heatseekers Albums (Billboard)	7
US Independent Albums (Billboard)	29
