= La Luz (band) =

American rock band

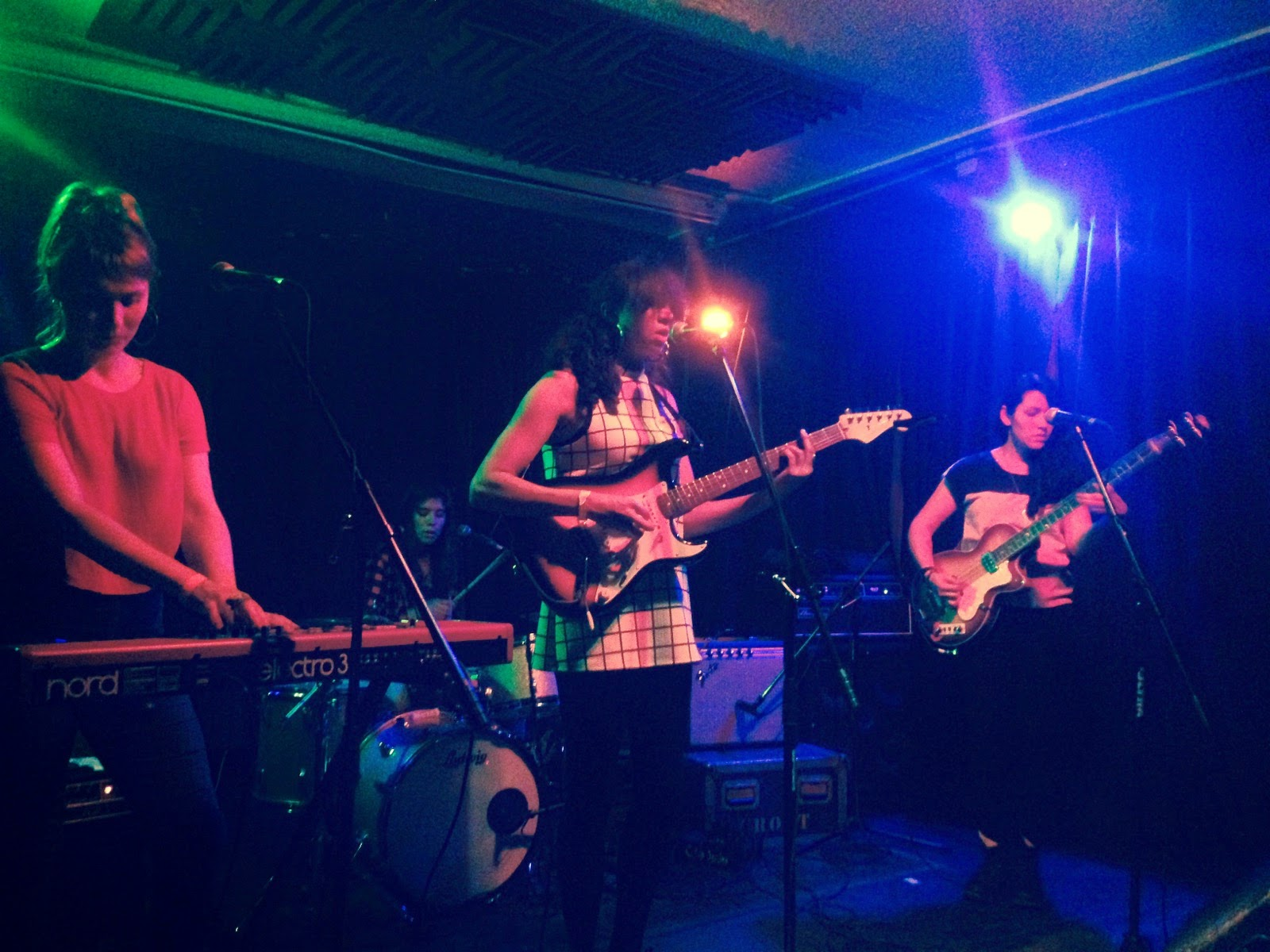
- Performing on tour in 2015

Background information
- Origin: Seattle, Washington, United States
- Genres: Indie rock, surf
- Years active: 2012–present
- Labels: Hardly Art, Burger Records, Sub Pop
- Members: Shana Cleveland; Audrey Johnson; Maryam Qudus; Lee Johnson
- Past members: Alice Sandahl; Lena Simon; Marian Li Pino; Abbey Blackwell; Katie Jacobson
- Website: laluzband.com

La Luz is an American rock band from Seattle, founded in 2012 by Shana Cleveland, Marian Li Pino, Abbey Blackwell and Katie Jacobson. La Luz has received critical acclaim following the release of five studio albums: It's Alive, Weirdo Shrine, Floating Features, the self-titled La Luz (all on Hardly Art) and News of the Universe on Sub Pop.

La Luz is known for their "surf noir" style, with layered vocal harmonies. Their energetic live shows often include Soul Train-inspired dance contests and crowd surfing.

== History ==
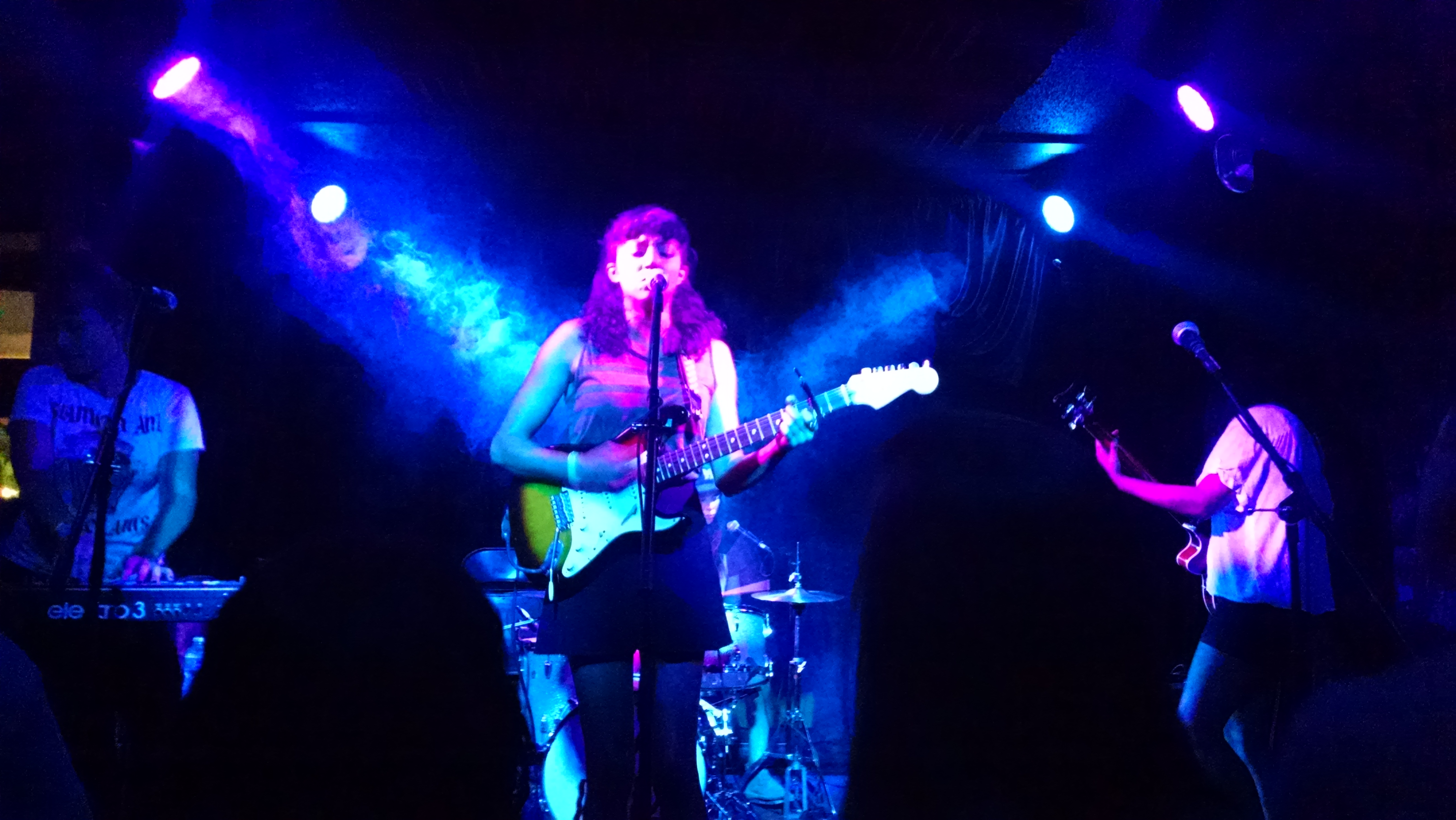
La Luz performing in New Orleans

Shana Cleveland formed the idea for La Luz after being inspired by surf and rock and roll acts like Link Wray, The Ventures, and Dick Dale, as well as girl groups like The Shirelles. Cleveland put together a band of fellow Seattle musicians (drummer Marian Li Pino, bassist Abbey Blackwell and keyboardist Katie Jacobson) and they immediately started rehearsing, recording and performing. The band name comes from the Spanish for "the light". Cleveland has cited Japanese guitar player Takeshi Terauchi as her biggest guitar influence. After releasing an EP titled Damp Face in 2012, La Luz signed with Hardly Art. Shortly after the release of Damp Face Jacobson left the band and was replaced by keyboardist Alice Sandahl. They released their first full-length album, It's Alive, on Hardly Art in October 2013.

On tour supporting of Montreal, La Luz was involved in a serious automobile accident on November 5, 2013, while traveling from Boise, Idaho, to Seattle, when their tour van slipped on black ice. After crashing into a highway divider, the van was hit by a semi-trailer truck. Band members sustained injuries, and all of the instruments and merchandise were destroyed with the tour van, forcing them to cancel the remainder of the tour.

In February 2014, bassist Abbey Blackwell left the group, and was replaced by Lena Simon. In August 2015, La Luz released their second album, Weirdo Shrine, again through Hardly Art. Produced by Ty Segall, the album was more live-sounding than previous efforts, and featured heavy fuzz guitar. Weirdo Shrine received positive reviews in The Guardian, Pitchfork, and The New York Times, and the group embarked on an international tour to support its release. They moved from Seattle to Los Angeles later that year.

In February 2024, Alice Sandahl announced her departure from the band and that she was being replaced by musician and producer Maryam Qudus, who has previously performed under the name Spacemoth. Near this time, Lena Simon was replaced by Lee Johnson on bass guitar. These lineup changes (especially with Maryam Qudus) allowed the band to develop its music style, using electronic effects and arpeggiators in some songs. The next album, News of the Universe, was released in May later that year by Sub Pop. Upon returning from touring the album, the band reworked and recorded five songs from News of the Universe and released them on a limited edition EP titled Extra! Extra! for Record Store Day Black Friday 2025. The EP was made available for streaming in January 2026.

== Band members ==
Current

- Shana Cleveland – guitar, lead vocals (2012–present)
- Audrey Johnson – drums, backing vocals (2021–present)
- Maryam Qudus – keyboard, backing vocals (2024–present)
- Lee Johnson – bass, backing vocals (2024–present)

Former

- Alice Sandahl – keyboard, backing vocals (2012–2024)
- Lena Simon – bass, backing vocals (2014–2024)
- Marian Li Pino – drums, backing vocals (2012–2019)
- Abbey Blackwell – bass, backing vocals (2012–2014)
- Katie Jacobson – keyboard, backing vocals (2012)

== Discography ==
=== Studio albums ===
List of studio albums, with selected chart positions
Title	Album details	Peak chart positions			
Title	Album details	UK DL	UK RS	UK Indie	UK Indie Br
It's Alive	Released: 15 October 2013; Label: Hardly Art; Format: CD, CS, DL, LP	—	—	—	—
Weirdo Shrine	Released: 7 August 2015; Label: Hardly Art; Format: CD, DL, LP	—	—	—	—
Floating Features	Released: 11 May 2018; Label: Hardly Art; Format: CD, DL, LP	—	13	33	10
La Luz	Released: 22 October 2021; Label: Hardly Art; Format: CD, DL, LP	—	24	46	13
News of the Universe	Released: 24 May 2024; Label: Sub Pop; Format: CD, DL, LP	98	29	24	7
"—" denotes a release that did not chart or was not released in that territory.

=== Live albums ===
- Live from the Black Hole (self-released, 2021)

=== Instrumental albums ===
- La Luz Instrumentals (Hardly Art, 2022)

=== Singles and EPs ===
Year	Title	Details	Tracklist	Release
2012	Damp Face EP	Label: - Self-released (2012) - Burger Records (BRGR 381, 2013, 2015) - Hardly Art (HAR 080, 2016) Mixed and recorded by Johnny Goss; Formats: Cassette, EP, Limited Edition, Reissue	1. Call Me in the Day; 2. Damp Face; 3. Sure as Spring; 4. Clear Night Sky; 5. Easy Baby	Damp Face EP (2012)
2013	Call Me in the Day b/w Easy Baby	Label: - Water Wing Records (WW09, 2013) Mixed and recorded by Johnny Goss; Formats: Vinyl, 7", 45 rpm, Single	1. Call Me in the Day; 2. Easy Baby	It's Alive (2013)
2013	Brainwash b/w TV Dream	Label: - Suicide Squeeze (S119, SSQ119, 2013, 2015, 2016) Mixed and recorded by Johnny Goss; Formats: Vinyl, 7", 45 rpm, Single, Test Pressing, Limited Edition	1. Brainwash; 2. TV Dream	N/A Single
2015	I'll Be True (La Luz) b/w Misunderstood (Habibi)	Label: - Split single; Volcom Entertainment Vinyl Club (VEVC 0041, 2015); Formats: 7", 45 rpm, Limited Edition, Numbered	1. I'll Be True (La Luz); 2. Misunderstood (Habibi)	Weirdo Shrine (2015)
2015	You Disappear	Label: - Hardly Art; Formats: CD-R, Single, Promo	1. You Disappear	Weirdo Shrine (2015)
2015	Believe My Eyes (La Luz) b/w Don't Want That (Scully)	Label: - Split single; Famous Class, (FC 032, 2015); Formats: 7", 45 rpm, Limited Edition, Single	1. Believe My Eyes (La Luz); 2. Don't Want That (Scully)	Less Artists More Condos #16 (2015)
2015	Clear Night Sky (La Luz) b/w Take a Short Breath (Old Lacy Bed)	Label: - Split single; 2670records (2015); Formats: 7", Single, Limited Edition, Record Store Day	1. Clear Night Sky (La Luz); 2. Take a Short Breath (Old Lacy Bed)	N/A Single
2016	Live! at Sonic Boom Records 10/15/13	Label: - Analog Ghost Recordings (2016) - Burger Records (BRGR 381, 2013, 2015) - Hardly Art (HAR 080, 2016) Record Store Day 2016 release, edition of 30. Includes instructions on configuring a tone arm and photograph of the show.; Formats: 7", Limited Edition, Record Store Day	1. Pink Slime; 2. Damp Face	Live! at Sonic Boom Records 10/15/13 (2016)
2018	Cicada	Label: - Hardly Art (2018); Formats: CD-R, Single, Promo	1. Cicada	Floating Features (2018)
2018	California Finally	Label: - Hardly Art (2018); Formats: CD-R, Single, Promo	1. California Finally	Floating Features (2018)
2018	Loose Teeth	Label: - Hardly Art (2018); Formats: CD-R, Single, Promo	1. Loose Teeth	Floating Features (2018)
2021	In the Country	Label: - Hardly Art (2021); Formats: CD-R, Single, Promo	1. In the Country	La Luz (2021)
2021	The Pines	Label: - Hardly Art (2021); Formats: CD-R, Single, Promo	1. The Pines	La Luz (2021)
2021	Metal Man	Label: - Hardly Art (2021); Formats: CD-R, Single, Promo	1. Metal Man	La Luz (2021)
2022	Endless Afternoon b/w San Fernando Blues	Label: - Hardly Art (HAR, 144, 2022); Formats: 7", 45 rpm, CD-R, Promo	1. Endless Afternoon; 2. San Fernando Blues	N/A Single
2024	Strange World	Label: - Sub Pop (2024); Formats:	1. Strange World	News of the Universe (2024)
2024	Poppies	Label: - Sub Pop (2024); Formats:	1. Poppies	News of the Universe (2024)
2024	I'll Go With You	Label: - Sub Pop (2024); Formats:	1. I'll Go With You	News of the Universe (2024)
2024	Always in Love	Label: - Sub Pop (2024); Formats:	1. Always in Love	News of the Universe (2024)
2026	Extra! Extra!	Label: - Sub Pop; Formats: Limited Edition, Record Store Day, Digital Reissue	1. News of the Universe (Extra! Extra! Version); 2. Strange World (Extra! Extra! Version); 3. Good Luck With Your Secret (Extra! Extra! Version); 4. I'll Go With You (Extra! Extra! Version); 5. Poppies (Extra! Extra! Version)	Extra! Extra! EP
