= Tacocat =

American feminist pop punk quartet

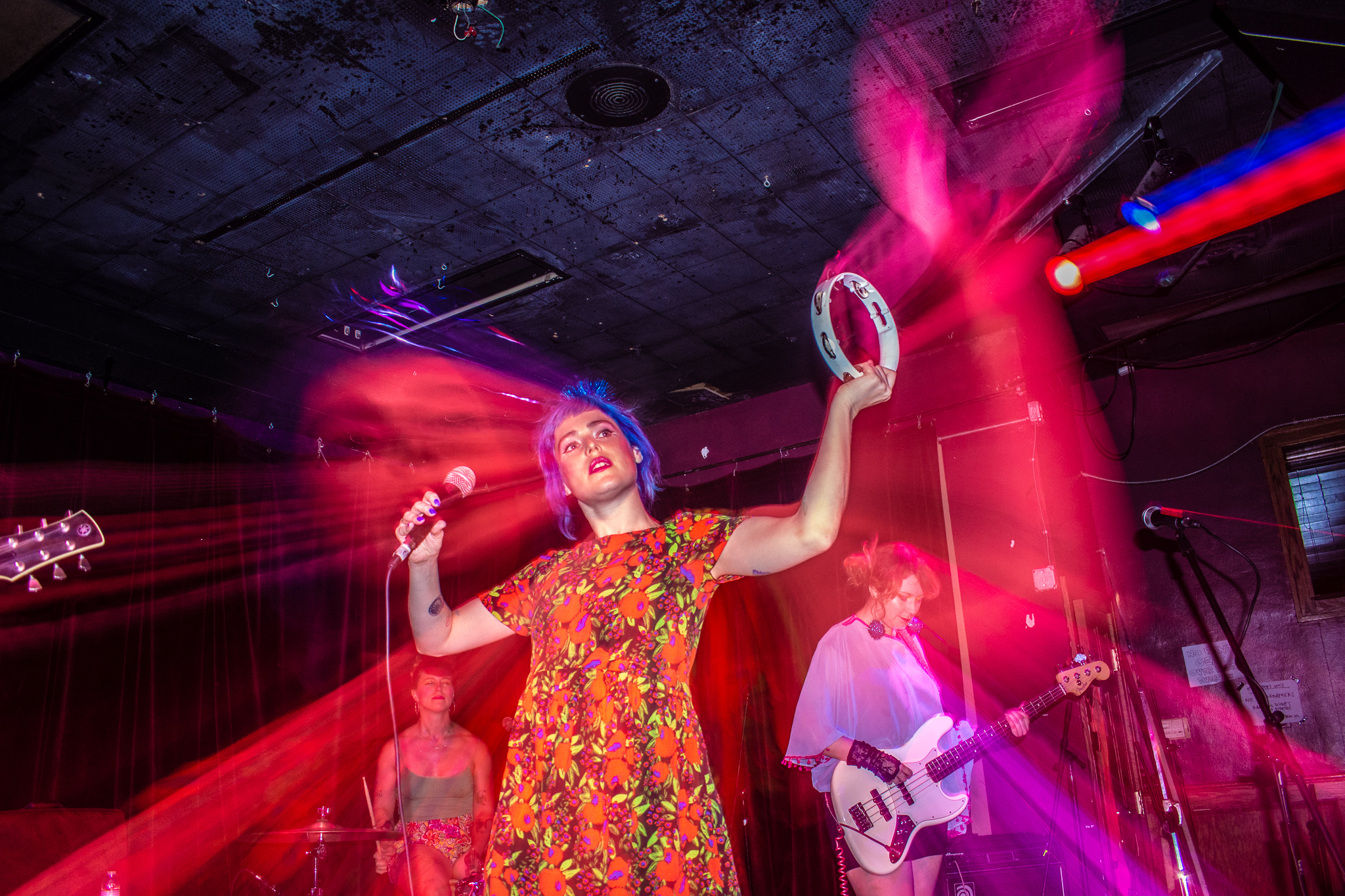
- Tacocat performing at Ace of Cups in Columbus, OH 8.18.18

Background information
- Origin: Seattle
- Genres: Punk rock, Pop punk, surf punk
- Years active: 2007–present
- Label: Hardly Art · Sub Pop
- Members: Emily Nokes; Bree McKenna; Lelah Maupin; Eric Randall
- Website: tacocatdotcom.com

Tacocat is an American punk rock band from Seattle, founded in 2007 and consisting of Emily Nokes, Bree McKenna, Lelah Maupin, and Eric Randall. They gained popularity in 2014 following the release of their second album NVM, engineered by Conrad Uno. The album received positive reviews in the music press, including from Pitchfork, AllMusic, and PopMatters, and also reached the CMJ top 10 college radio albums.

Tacocat addresses feminist themes in many of their songs using humor and sarcasm. The song "Crimson Wave" is a period-positive beach anthem featuring red imagery and humorous menstruation metaphors. The music video for the song gained over 10,000 views in a single week on YouTube, and has since gotten over 415,000 views. The band also jokes about other themes such as seasonal affective disorder in Seattle on "Bridge to Hawaii" and waiting for a late bus on "FU #8."

== History ==
Drummer Lelah Maupin and guitarist Eric Randall first met in Longview, Washington while working together at a Safeway grocery store. Randall met bassist Bree McKenna while his band was practicing in the basement of a punk house where she lived. Lelah Maupin met Emily Nokes in a graphic design class. The four bonded over their mutual affection for 1990s music, the riot grrrl movement, and Kevin Costner's Waterworld. They started making music together, performing at small shows and releasing singles. Tacocat's roots in the DIY (Do It Yourself) culture of indie music embody a spirit of self-sufficiency and innovation. They released their DIY debut album Shame Spiral in 2010. That year, they also signed with Subpop imprint Hardly Art and released their second EP Take Me to Your Dealer. The Woman's Day EP followed in 2011. The band would exhaustively tour the United States over the next few years, playing basements and house shows. Other notable releases include a Ghost Mice/Tacocat split 7-inch, a riot grrrl cover compilation album released on Teenage Teardrops Records (featuring cover art by Jessica Hopper), and the much coveted DIY tour tapes such as Frenching and Food Stamps and OMG.

In a 2012 installment of Your Favorite Band, a series of fictitious satirical articles for VICE, Bree McKenna claimed to be the illegitimate child of Bob Saget.

The band was involved in a controversy involving pop singer Katy Perry when her Super Bowl 2015 half-time show featured backup dancers in shark costumes that looked similar to Tacocat's in the "Crimson Wave" video.

=== 2014 NVM Tour ===
Tacocat went on a national tour in March 2014 in support of their album NVM, playing many shows in the Pacific Northwest and across the United States, including in Los Angeles, Tucson, New Orleans, Atlanta, Baltimore, Columbus, Las Vegas, New York City, Miami, Boston, and Little Rock. They also toured Europe in fall 2014 with visits to many major cities including Barcelona, Berlin, London and Vienna.

=== Lost Time ===
Tacocat's third album Lost Time came out on Hardly Art Records on April 1, 2016. Their premiere, pro-service worker single, "I Hate the Weekend," was announced in January 2016. On February 15, 2016, Pitchfork streamed "Talk," the second single from the album, and reported that they will record the theme song to the 2016 Powerpuff Girls reboot.

Singer Emily Nokes was influenced by the science fiction series The X-Files during the writing of Lost Time. The name of the album is a reference to the pilot episode of The X-Files, which touched on the lost time phenomenon. The album opens with a track titled "Dana Katherine Scully" celebrating the fictional character played by Gillian Anderson.

Tacocat were included in the Coachella 2017 line-up.

=== This Mess Is a Place ===
The band released their fourth full-length album, This Mess is a Place on May 3, 2019, on Sub Pop Records

== Members ==
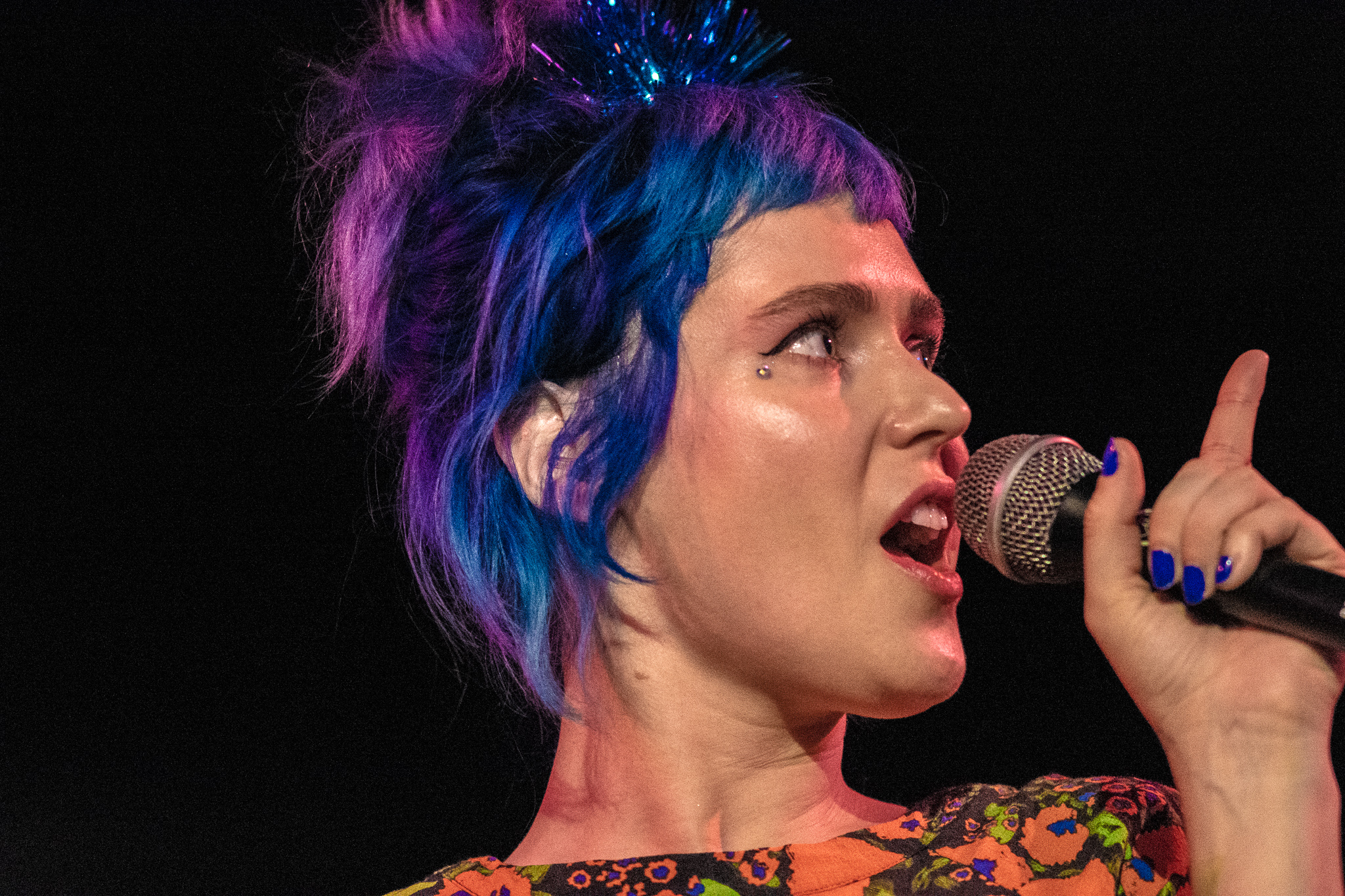
Emily Nokes

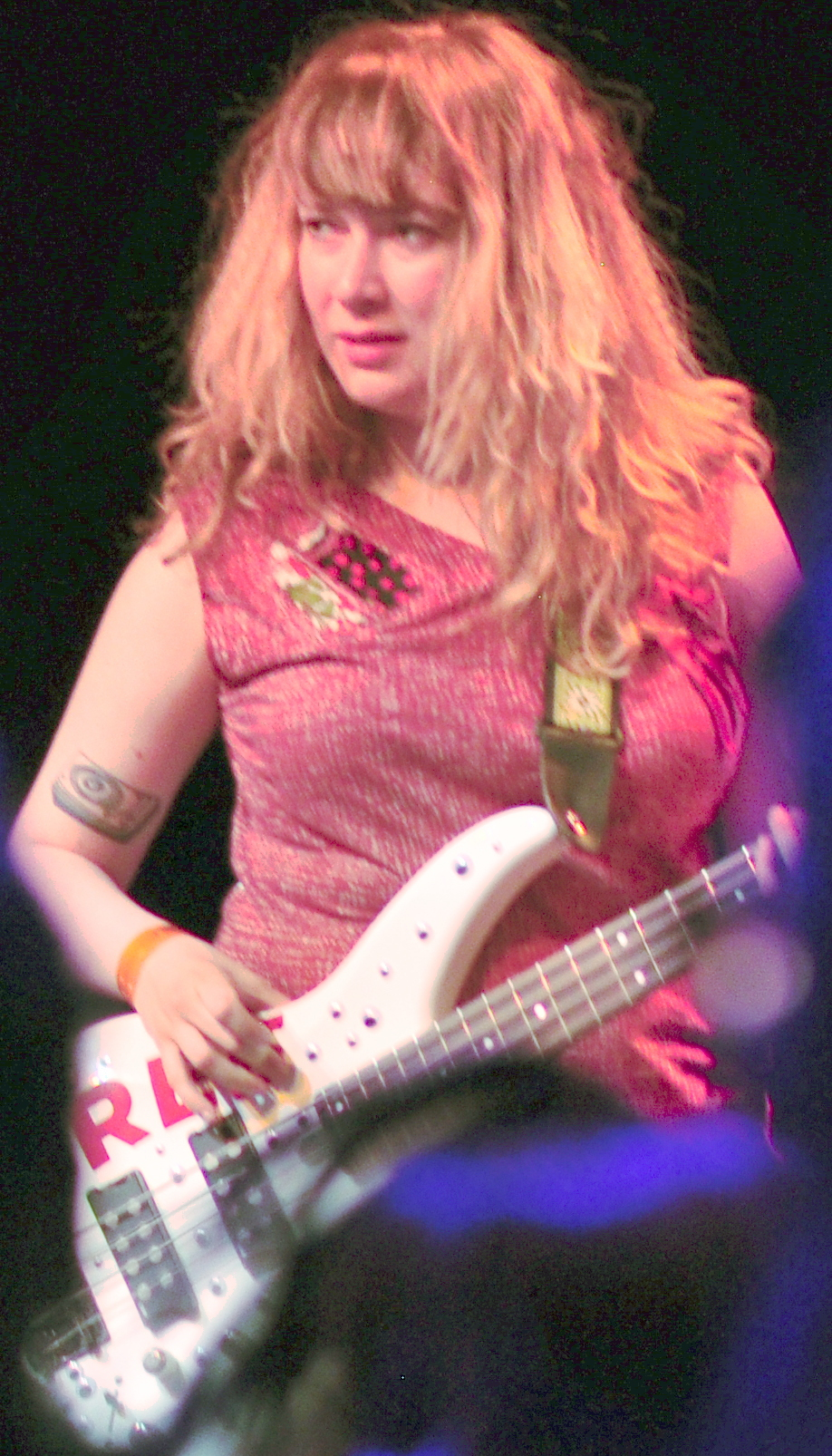
Bree McKenna

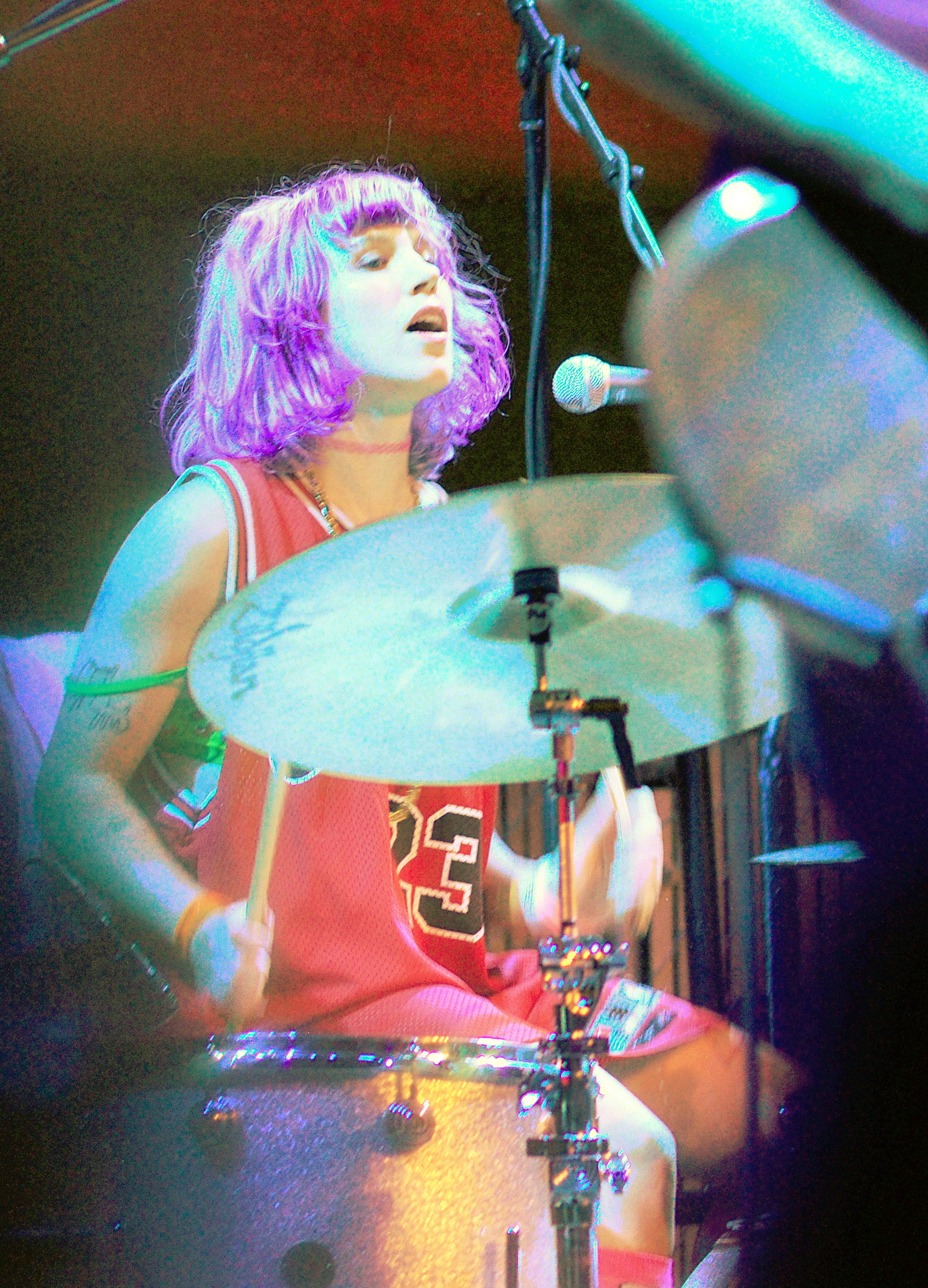
Lelah Maupin

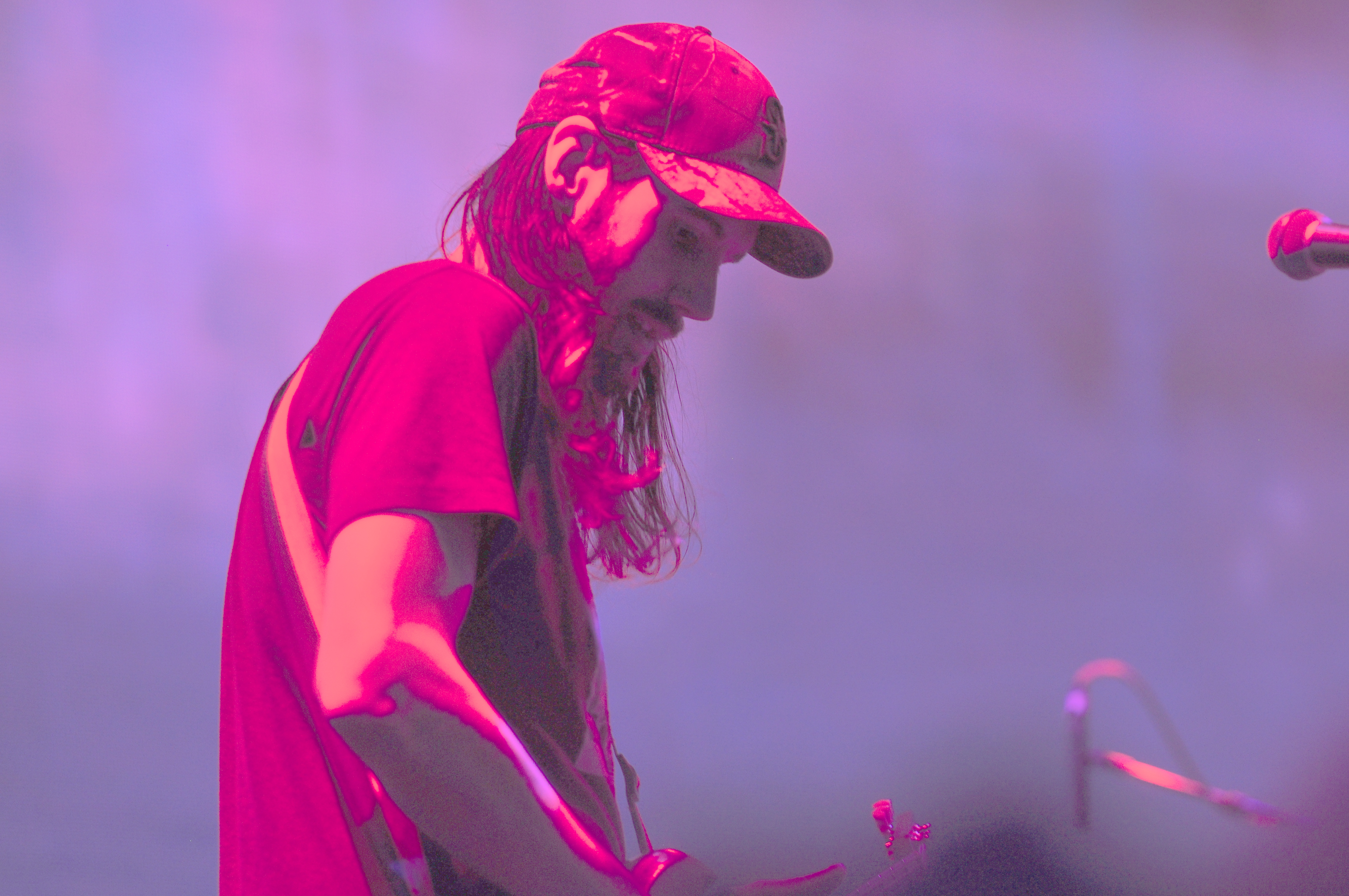
Eric Randall

== Discography ==
=== Albums ===
- Shame Spiral (Don't Stop Believin' Records, 2008)
- NVM (Hardly Art, 2014)
- Lost Time (Hardly Art, 2016)
- This Mess Is a Place (Sub Pop, 2019)

=== EPs ===
- Ghost Mice/Tacocat Split (Plan-It-X Records, 2009)
- This is Happening Without Your Permission Split (Teenage Teardrops, 2009)
- Woman's Day (Minor Bird Records, 2011)
- Take Me to Your Dealer (Hardly Art, 2012)

=== Tapes ===
- Frenching and Foodstamps (self-release, 2009)
- OMG (self-release, 2010)

=== Singles ===
- "Bridge to Hawaii" (Hardly Art, 2013)
- "Crimson Wave" (Hardly Art, 2014)
- "Talk" (Hardly Art, 2016)
- "Grains of Salt" (Sub Pop, 2019)
