= It's Alive (La Luz album) =

Studio album by La Luz
- Released: October 15, 2013
- Genre: Rock
- Length: 33:40
- Label: Hardly Art

La Luz chronology
It's Alive (2013)	Weirdo Shrine (2015)

Professional ratings
Aggregate scores
Source	Rating
Metacritic	67/100
Review scores
Source	Rating
AllMusic	3.5/5 stars

It's Alive is the debut studio album by American band La Luz. It was released in October 2013 under Hardly Art.

== Track listing ==
No.	Title	Length
1.	"Sure as Spring"	2:23
2.	"All the Time"	2:48
3.	"Morning High"	4:05
4.	"What Good Am I?"	3:51
5.	"Sunstroke"	1:32
6.	"It's Alive"	3:37
7.	"Big Big Blood"	3:09
8.	"Call Me in the Day"	3:19
9.	"Pink Slime"	2:23
10.	"Phantom Feelings"	2:20
11.	"You Can Never Know"	4:13
