= No Regerts =

Studio album by Chastity Belt
- Released: August 13, 2013
- Genres: Indie rock, noise pop
- Label: Help Yourself

Chastity Belt chronology
| No Regerts (2013) | Time to Go Home (2015) |

No Regerts is the debut studio album by American rock band Chastity Belt, released on August 13, 2013 through Help Yourself.

== Music and lyrics ==
Fred Thomas of AllMusic characterized the sound on No Regerts as "volley[ing] between stations of amped-up punk rage and gorgeously intricate guitar rock." The music has drawn comparisons to Buzzcocks and Beach House. Jayson Greene of Pitchfork said the album's lyrics are "about college, and fresh-out-of-college concerns," and that the album "breathes some of the same untroubled air as the first Vampire Weekend album."

== Reception and legacy ==
Fred Thomas of AllMusic gave the album three and a half stars out of five. He wrote: "Misty, beautiful, and decidedly of the same Pacific Northwestern moods that served as a breeding ground for some of their greatest '90s influences, Chastity Belt's debut never takes itself too seriously or too lightly, but keeps its own unique pace and finds balance on its own unpredictable terms." Jayson Greene of Pitchfork wrote: "There are silly moments on No Regerts that cut down on its replayability, but there are also dusky, gorgeous songs like 'Black Sail' and 'Happiness', which latch onto and hold a pink-skies melancholy for their running time. The album's slightness is part of its overall appeal, though. No Regerts sounds young and callow and smart and horny all at the same time. Playing it feels like a night out."

In 2019, Ellen Johnson of Paste named the album as one of the best indie rock releases of the 2010s. She said: "No Regerts remains a snapshot of a young band who knew exactly what they wanted to say, everyone else be damned. They’re still one of the coolest bands working in indie rock."
