= Gem Club =

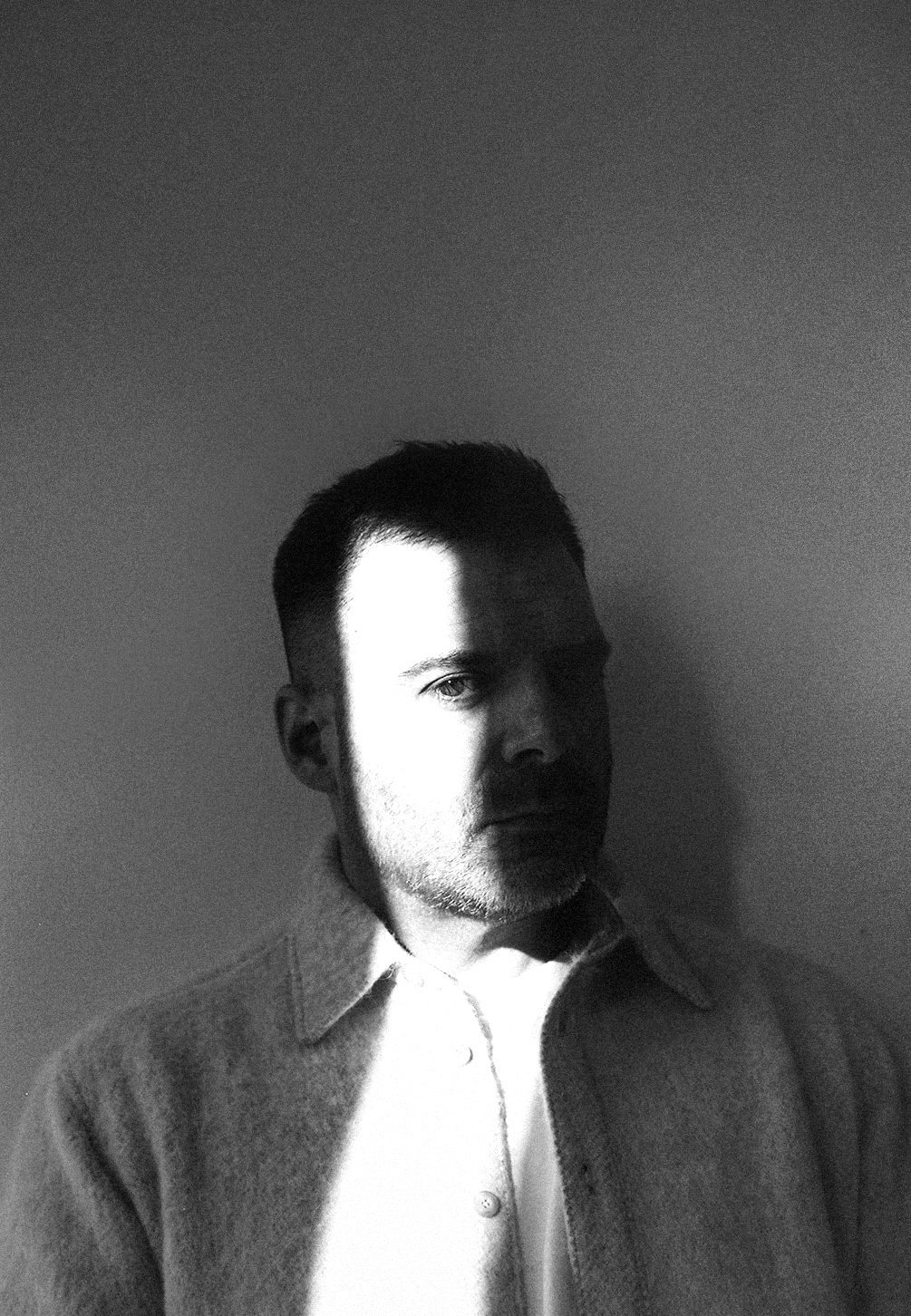

Background information
- Origin: Somerville, Massachusetts, United States
- Genres: Chamber pop, dream pop, ambient
- Years active: 2010–present
- Label: Hardly Art
- Members: Christopher Barnes
- Past members: Kristen Drymala; Ieva Berberian
- Website: www.iamgemclub.com

Gem Club is an American chamber pop band formed in Somerville, Massachusetts by singer-songwriter Christopher Barnes.

== History ==
Gem Club was formed by Christopher Barnes, with cellist Kristen Drymala, at the end of 2009. Their first EP, Acid and Everything, was recorded in Barnes' Somerville, MA home and self-released in June 2010. The EP was written as part of the RPM Challenge, a challenge for musicians to write and record an album during the month of February.

Gem Club was soon after signed to Hardly Art, a Sub Pop sub-label, and began working with vocalist Ieva Berberian. The group's debut full length, Breakers, was released September 27, 2011 and was met with critical success. The album was well reviewed by music sites and magazines NME, AllMusic, NPR, Pitchfork, Dusted, among others.

Their sophomore album, In Roses, was recorded entirely in analog to tape at John Vanderslice's Tiny Telephone Studios in San Francisco, CA, with orchestral work from Magik*Magik Orchestra featured on several songs. After a pre-release stream on NPR's First Listen, the album was released January 28, 2014. A music video for the album's lead single Polly was directed by Matthew Salton with photographer Charlie Engman and featuring Engman's mother Kathleen McCain Engman.

A limited run of postcards, each with a photograph taken by Boston-based Larson McGrath that was inspired by a song from In Roses album, were sold with the album. At a private performance in the South End in Boston, McGrath's photographs were displayed in the studio where the show was held. During this show, Barnes explained that "Marathon" is a song about the abusive relationship of an acquaintance of Barnes.

Their songs have been featured on the American television shows Parenthood, Arrow, Private Practice and Revenge, as well as Skins in the UK.

== Discography ==
=== Albums ===
- Breakers (Hardly Art, 2011)
- In Roses (Hardly Art, 2014)

=== EPs ===
- Acid and Everything (Self-released, 2010)
- Garlands (Self-released, May 15, 2025)

=== Compilations appearances ===
- "Fingertips" - Gem Club/Holy Spirits (Collaborations, Weget.by, 2011)
- "Helix", "It's Easier Now" (Old Fire: Songs from the Haunted South, Unknown Tone, 2017)
- "Mother in Comet" (S&S Presents: Dreams, Cascine, 2018)

== Television placements ==
- Parenthood (NB) — ”252” (Season 3, episode 13: "Just Smile")
- Revenge — (ABC) ”Red Arrow (John)” (Season 1, episode 12: "Infamy")
- Private Practice (ABC) — ”252” (Season 5, episode 16: "Andromeda")
- Skins (E4) — ”Breakers” (Season 6, episode 9: "Mini & Franky")
- Arrow (CTV) — ”I Heard the Party” (Season 1, episode 7: "Muse of Fire")
- Saving Hope — (CTV) "Hypericum" (Season 4, episode 4: "Miss You")
- The Shannara Chronicles — "Twins" (Season 1, episode 1: "Chosen")
- Locke & Key — "Spirit and Decline" (Season 2, episode 5: "Past Is Prologue")
- New Amsterdam (TV Series) — "Marathon (In Roses)" (Season 3, episode 10: "Radical")

== Awards and nominations ==
2016: Berlin Music Video Awards, nominated in the Best VFX category for 'Speech of Foxes'
