= Seapony =

American indie pop band

Seapony is an American indie pop band from Seattle. They formed in 2010 and have released three albums on Hardly Art.

== History ==
Seapony first attracted attention through four songs offered for free on Bandcamp. Their first release was the 3-song single, Dreaming, followed by their debut album, Go With Me, in 2011. Both of their albums have been recorded in a home studio. The trio are also known for their use of a drum machine in their recordings. Seapony toured Europe and Japan in 2013.

On September 7, 2015, Seapony announced via Facebook that the band was breaking up. However the band teased fans with a return when a new EP was announced via Facebook, on August 18, 2017, titled Be Here Again.

== Band members ==
- Jen Weidl – guitars, vocals
- Danny Rowland – guitar
- Ian Brewer – bass guitar

== Discography ==
- Dreaming EP (2010)
- Go With Me (album) (2011)
- Sailing EP (2011)
- Falling (album) (2012)
- A Vision (album) (2015)
- Be Here Again EP (2017)
