= Live Laugh Love (Chastity Belt album) =

Studio album by Chastity Belt
- Released: March 29, 2024
- Recorded: 2020–2023
- Studio: Seahorse Sound (Los Angeles)
- Length: 42:10
- Label: Suicide Squeeze

Chastity Belt chronology
Chastity Belt (2019)	Live Laugh Love (2024)

Singles from Live Laugh Love
- 1. "Hollow" Released: November 14, 2023; 2. "I-90 Bridge" Released: January 24, 2024; 3. "Chemtrails" Released: February 28, 2024

Live Laugh Love is the fifth studio album by American band Chastity Belt. It was released on March 29, 2024, as their label debut on Suicide Squeeze Records as well as their first studio release in five years, following the self-titled album (2019).

== Background ==
Live Laugh Love marks the first time all four band members sing on an album. It was recorded over the course of three years in three different sessions, following a period that saw the band members release solo singles and venture into other projects. Working together on the album, band member Lydia Lund revealed that they have developed a "strong sense of each other's musical inclinations" that results into "playfulness" for they can "surprise each other".

== Singles ==
The lead single "Hollow" was released alongside the album announcement on November 14, 2023, and features "merging shoegaze-tinged sonics" combined with "affecting vocals" by lead member Julia Shapiro. The track was conceived in Joshua Tree, California in spring 2021 and was described as "a classic Chazzy-style tune about feeling lost and stuck" by Shapiro. On January 24, 2024, the band released "I-90 Bridge", a "melancholic" song named after a bridge in their home state of Washington. The third single "Chemtrails", released on February 28, "started off as a jam" during tour rehearsals and deals with the inability to let go.

== Track listing ==
All tracks are written by Julia Shapiro, Lydia Lund, Annie Truscott, and Gretchen Grimm.

Live Laugh Love track listing
No.	Title	Length
1.	"Hollow"	3:54
2.	"Funny"	3:13
3.	"Clumsy"	3:29
4.	"It's Cool"	3:10
5.	"Kool-Aid"	2:51
6.	"Chemtrails"	3:58
7.	"Blue"	4:26
8.	"Tethered"	3:28
9.	"I-90 Bridge"	4:53
10.	"Laugh"	5:15
11.	"Like That"	3:33
Total length:		42:10

== Personnel ==
Chastity Belt

- Julia Shapiro – vocals (tracks 1–7, 9–11), guitar (all tracks); keyboards, backing vocals (8), artwork
- Lydia Lund – guitar
- Annie Truscott – bass
- Gretchen Grimm – drums (all tracks), vocals (track 8)

Additional contributors

- Samur Khouja – mixing, recording
- Heba Kadry – mastering
- Dave Reichardt – engineering assistance
- Frank Correa – poster photo
