= NVM (album) =

Studio album by Tacocat
- Released: February 25, 2014
- Genre: Pop punk
- Length: 27:47
- Label: Hardly Art

Tacocat chronology
| Shame Spiral (2008) | NVM (2014) | Lost Time (2016) |

NVM is the second studio album by Seattle, Washington-based pop punk band Tacocat. It was released on February 25, 2014 on the Hardly Art label.

Professional ratings
Review scores
| Source | Rating |
|---|---|
| AllMusic | 3.5/5 stars |
| Loud and Quiet | 6/10 |
| Pitchfork | 7.4/10 |
| PopMatters | 7/10 stars |
| Vice (Expert Witness) | A– |

== Track listing ==
1. "You Never Came Back"
2. "Bridge to Hawaii"
3. "Crimson Wave"
4. "Stereogram"
5. "Pocket Full of Primrose"
6. "Psychedelic Quinceañera"
7. "Time Pirate"
8. "This Is Anarchy"
9. "Hey Girl"
10. "Party Trap"
11. "F.U. #8"
12. "Alien Girl" (The Crabs cover)
13. "Snow Day"

== Personnel ==
Tacocat

- Lelah Maupin
- Bree McKenna
- Emily Nokes
- Eric Randall

Production

- Chris Hanzser – mastering
- Conrad Uno – engineer
