= Dude York =

American rock band

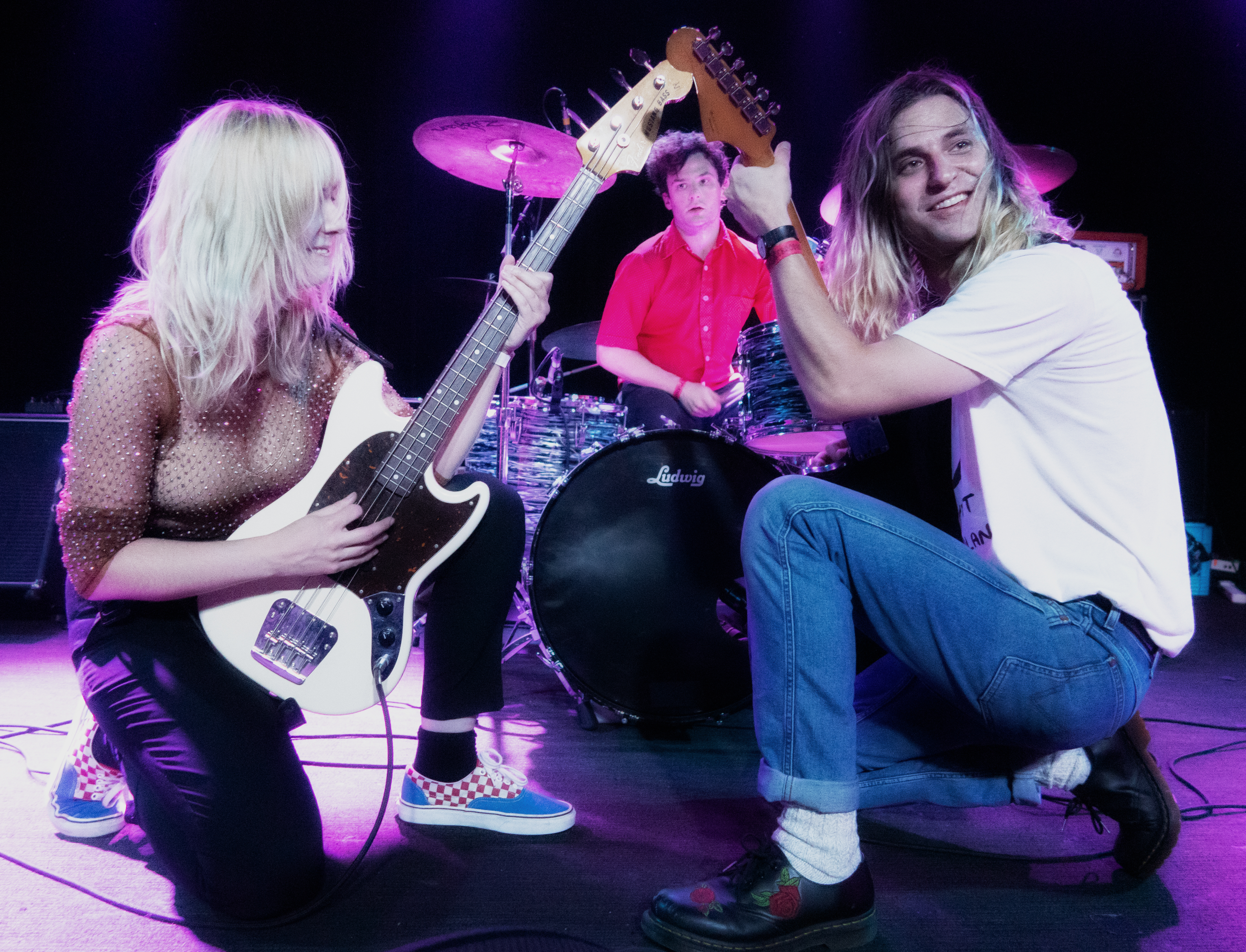
- Dude York performing in 2019

Background information
- Origin: Seattle, Washington
- Genres: Rock
- Years active: 2012–present
- Labels: Hardly Art
- Members: Peter Richards; Claire England; Andrew Hall
- Website: dude-york.com

Dude York is an American rock band from Seattle, Washington.

== History ==
Dude York began in 2012, with the release of a 7" titled Escape From Dude York. Two years later, they released their debut full-length album, Dehumanize, on Help Yourself Records.

In 2016, Dude York signed to Hardly Art, and the following year released their second full-length album, Sincerely, with the label. Whereas guitarist Peter Richards was the primary singer on previous releases, this album was the first to offer songwriting and lead vocals from bassist Claire England as well.

In 2017, Dude York released their third full-length album, Halftime for the Holidays, and toured the United States with Alex Lahey.

In 2018, Dude York released their single, "Moon", and toured Europe with Bully.

== Band members ==
- Peter Richards (guitar, vocals)
- Claire England (bass, vocals)
- Andrew Hall (drums, vocals)

== Discography ==
Studio albums

- Dehumanize (2014, Help Yourself)
- Sincerely (2017, Hardly Art)
- Halftime for the Holidays (2017, Hardly Art)
- Falling (2019, Hardly Art)

EPs

- Escape From Dude York (2012, The Sounds Of Sweet Nothing)
- Happy in the Meantime (2019, Hardly Art)

Singles

- "Moon" (2018, Hardly Art)
