= Le Loup =

American indie band (formed 2006)

- Le Loup live at the Black Cat in Washington, DC 12/10/2007 (Adam Shlossman)

Background information
- Origin: Washington, D.C., USA
- Genres: Indie, Folk
- Years active: 2006–2011
- Labels: Hardly Art, Talitres
- Members: Christian Ervin; Michael Ferguson; Robert Sahm; Sam Simkoff; Jim Thomson
- Past members: Nicole Keenan; May Tabol; Dan Ryan

Le Loup was an American indie band founded in September 2006, in Washington, D.C. by Sam Simkoff (keyboard/banjo). The band also includes Christian Ervin (computer), Michael Ferguson (guitar), Dan Ryan (bass), Robert Sahm (drums) and Jim Thomson (guitar). Their name is French for "The Wolf". The group has drawn comparisons to Sufjan Stevens, Arcade Fire, The Books, Animal Collective and Yeasayer.

The group is currently signed to Hardly Art, a label started by Sub Pop founder Jonathan Poneman in early 2007. Their debut album, The Throne of the Third Heaven of the Nations' Millennium General Assembly was released on September 11, 2007. Their most recent album, Family, was released by Hardly Art on September 22, 2009.

Their song "Morning Song" is featured in BlackBerry commercials released the summer of 2010.

Through their Facebook page they announced that they are no longer playing together.

== Discography ==
- The Throne of the Third Heaven of the Nations' Millennium General Assembly (2007)
- Family (2009)
