= The Dutchess and the Duke =

- Origin: Seattle, Washington, US
- Genres: Indie folk
- Years active: 2008–2010, 2014–2015
- Labels: Hardly Art, Third Man
- Members: Kimberly Morrison; Jesse Lortz; Oscar Michel; Greg Ashley
- Website: The Dutchess and the Duke on Myspace

The Dutchess and the Duke was a folk band formed in Seattle, Washington, by singer-songwriters Jesse Lortz and Kimberly Morrison. Their music has been compared to the raw garage rock of the early 1960s.

Friends since childhood, Morrison and Lortz have been connected musically since 2002, when they played together in a deconstructionist R&B band called The Flying Dutchman.

Once The Flying Dutchman folded, Lortz established his own record label, Boom Boom Party Records, and played in punk trio The Fe Fi Fo Fums, while Morrison performed with such acts as The Intelligence, The Fallouts, Rotten Apples, and most recently the Unnatural Helpers. They reconnected to recorded together again with the one-off girl group homage The Sultanas.

Following the Sultanas single, Morrison and Lortz recorded "Reservoir Park" as a single for Lortz's independent Boom Boom label in 2007. They called themselves "The Dutchess and the Duke" as a nod to their days with The Flying Dutchman. As the only female member of The Flying Dutchman, Morrison was often referred to as the Dutchess.

Their first full-length album, She's the Dutchess, He's the Duke, was released in June 2008. The album was recorded on an 8-track with the vocals recorded at close range. The first track of the record, "Reservoir Park," was showcased in HBO's Entourage.

They released a second album, "Sunset/Sunrise" in 2009. The lyrics for the second album, written by Lortz, are apparently autobiographical as they deal with one-sided relationships, personal demons, and fatherhood.

The Dutchess and the Duke disbanded in October 2010.

Lortz released an album with his new project, Case Studies, in August 2011, titled "The World is Just a Shape to Fill the Night" and then "This Is Another Life" in 2013.

In 2014, the band reunited briefly for a handful of live performances. One of these was recorded live at Jack White's Third Man Records on October 10, 2014, and subsequently released on vinyl in 2015.

== Discography ==
- She's The Dutchess, He's The Duke (2008)
- Sunset/Sunrise (2009)
- Live At Third Man Records (2015)
