= Emily Nokes =

American musician

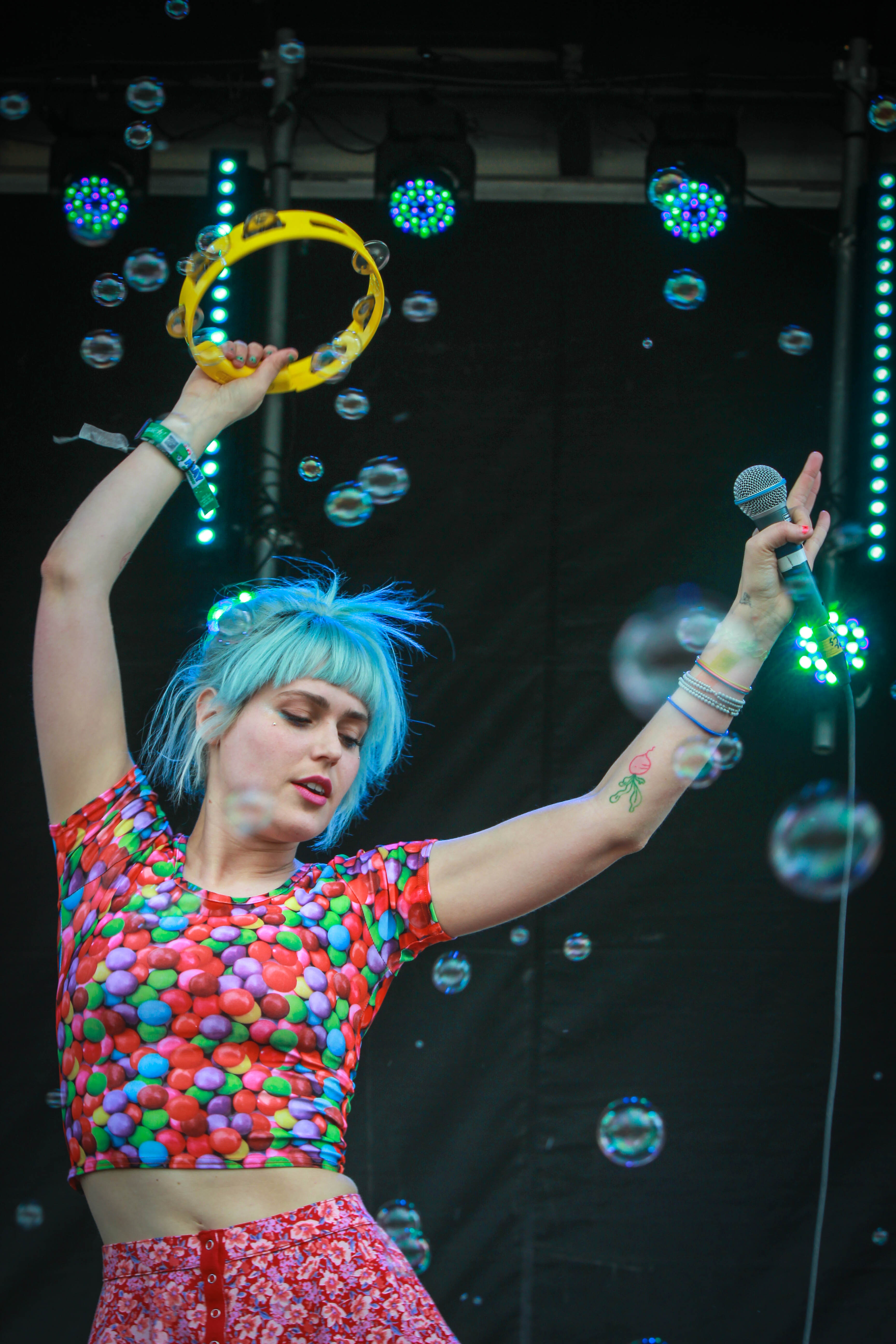
- Emily Nokes performs with Tacocat at Sasquatch Music Festival in 2014
- Born: Butte, Montana
- Occupations: Singer, writer
- Known for: Lead singer of Tacocat

Emily Nokes is a writer, artist, music critic and musician. She has been the singer of the feminist pop-punk band Tacocat since 2007. She is also the music editor for Bust Magazine, and the former music editor at The Stranger from 2012 to 2015.

== Early life ==
Nokes is from Butte, Montana and started writing songs when she was a child.

She moved to Seattle when she was 19 to become a graphic designer. She attended The Art Institute of Seattle where she met the bandmates who would later form Tacocat.

== Career ==
=== Music ===
Nokes is the lead singer, tambourine player and a songwriter for Tacocat. Her creative process involves writing down snippets of ideas in a notebook and workshopping them with other bandmates into full songs:

When it’s time to start making new music, my bandmates usually get together and hash together instrumental ideas that they’ll show me via phone recording or practice jam. I then just start thinking about melodies and seeing if any of the lyrics fit, keeping the feeling of the music versus the feeling of the lyrics in mind, though I don’t mind (and sometimes prefer) sad-sounding music paired with silly lyrics or upbeat music paired with darker lyrics. It’s a fun little jigsaw puzzle for each song! Sometimes it snaps together right away, sometimes you have to tinker with it for weeks.

As part of Tacocat, Nokes has received positive recognition from critics, including The Seattle Times, Pitchfork and the AV Club. The Monitor editor Jon LaFollette calls out Nokes' lyrics in support of both blue-collar workers and "mini-feminist anthems". La Sera's Katy Goodman has called Tacocat "the best band in the world."

Nokes' singing voice has been praised for its dynamic range, from "throaty depths to soaring peaks". Music journalist Greil Marcus said "she could be singing in French and you'd come away feeling the same".

=== Politics ===
Nokes identifies as a feminist and her songs address topics from catcalling to menstruation. She is an activist for queer, anti-racist, and anti-transphobic causes, especially with regards to art:

We need to demand more from everything all the time — for women, for queer folks, for trans folks, for people of color, and for everyone else who lives outside of the standard-issue, mostly-white/mostly-male representation across all platforms of expression.

Nokes is a pro-choice advocate, and wrote a magazine promoting Planned Parenthood after the start of the #ShoutYourAbortion social media campaign. In 2021, she protested outside of the Supreme Court of the United States, promoting the safety of abortion pills.

== Personal life ==
Nokes lives on Capitol Hill, a neighborhood in Seattle, Washington. She has stated that if she weren't in a band, she would want to be a candy taster.
