= Hardly Art =

American independent record label

- Parent company: Sub Pop Records
- Founded: 2007
- Distributor: Alternative Distribution Alliance/Sub Pop
- Genre: Indie rock, alternative rock, punk rock, rock
- Country of origin: United States
- Location: Seattle, Washington
- Official website: hardlyart.com

Hardly Art is an American independent record label based in Seattle, Washington. Founded in early 2007 by Sub Pop Records, Hardly Art is run by three full-time employees and is distributed by the Alternative Distribution Alliance (ADA) and Sub Pop. The label's name comes from a lyric from the song "No Culture Icons" by the Thermals. In 2016, the label was recognized for its contributions to independent music with a Genius Award Nomination from The Stranger.

== Selected artists ==
- Arthur & Yu
- The Beets
- Carissa's Wierd
- Chastity Belt
- Colleen Green
- Dude York
- Fergus & Geronimo
- Gazebos
- Gem Club
- Grave Babies
- Hunx and His Punx
- Ian Sweet
- Jenn Champion
- Lala Lala
- La Luz
- La Sera
- Le Loup
- Protomartyr
- S
- Seapony
- Shannon and the Clams
- Tacocat
- The Dutchess & the Duke
- The Julie Ruin
- The Moondoggies
- The Sandwitches
- Versing
- youbet

== Release history ==
Artist	Title	Year
Arthur & Yu	In Camera	2007
Le Loup	The Throne of the Third Heaven of the Nations' Millennium General Assembly	2007
The Dutchess & the Duke	She's the Dutchess, He's the Duke	2008
The Moondoggies	Don't Be A Stranger	2008
The Moondoggies	Record Store Day EP	2009
The Pica Beats	Beating Back the Claws of the Cold	2008
Pretty & Nice	Get Young	2008
Talbot Tagora	Lessons in the Woods or a City	2009
Le Loup	Family	2009
The Dutchess & the Duke	Sunset/Sunrise	2009
V/A	Amazon Sampler	2009
Golden Triangle	Double Jointer	2010
Unnatural Helpers	Sunshine/Pretty Girls	2010
Unnatural Helpers	Cracked Love & Other Drugs	2010
Golden Triangle/The Fresh and Onlys	Split 7"	2010
Carissa's Wierd	They'll Only Miss You When You Leave: Songs 1996-2003	2010
Carissa's Wierd	Die	2010
V/A	Amazon Sampler	2010
The Moondoggies	You'll Find No Answers Here EP	2010
Woven Bones	I've Gotta Get b/w Hey Kid	2010
The Moondoggies	Tidelands	2010
Carissa's Wierd	Ugly But Honest	2010
Carissa's Wierd	You Should Be at Home Here	2010
Carissa's Wierd	Songs About Leaving	2010
Fergus & Geronimo	Never Satisfied b/w Turning Blue	2010
La Sera	Never Come Around b/w Behind Your Eyes	2010
The Moondoggies	It's a Shame, It's a Pity	2010
Carissa's Wierd	Scrap Book	2010
Carissa's Wierd	I Before E	2010
Fergus & Geronimo	Unlearn	2011
La Sera	Devil Hearts Grow Gold b/w Dedicated to the One I Love	2011
La Sera	La Sera	2011
Colleen Green	Green One EP	2011
Dizzy Eyes	Let's Break Up the Band	2011
Circle Pit	Slave b/w Honey	2011
Hunx & His Punx	Too Young to Be in Love	2011
Seapony	Dreaming	2011
Seapony	Go With Me	2011
Jacuzzi Boys	Glazin'	2011
Gold Leaves	The Ornament	2011
Gem Club	Breakers	2011
Unnatural Helpers	Land Grab	2012
Shimmering Stars	Violent Hearts	2011
Carissa's Wierd	Tucson	2011
Grave Babies	Pleasures	2011
Xray Eyeballs	Sundae	2011
The Beets	Let the Poison Out	2011
Hunx & His Punx	Mr. Lemonade	2011
The Sandwitches	The Pearl	2011
Seapony	Sailing	2011
La Sera	Sees the Light	2012
Hunx	Hairdresser Blues	2012
Magic Trick	Ruler of the Night	2012
Black Marble	Weight Against the Door	2012
Tacocat	Take Me to Your Dealer	2012
Fergus & Geronimo	Funky Was the State of Affairs	2012
Grave Babies	Gothdammit	2012
K-Holes	Dismania	2012
Broken Water	Tempest	2012
Deep Time	Deep Time	2012
Seapony	Falling	2012
Black Marble	A Different Arrangement	2012
V/A	Amazon Sampler	2012
Colleen Green	Sock it to Me	2013
Lost Animal	Ex Tropical	2013
Grave Babies	Crusher	2013
We Are Loud Whisperers	Suchness	2013
Shannon and the Clams	Dreams in the Rat House	2013
Hausu	Total	2013
The Moondoggies	Adios I'm a Ghost	2013
Jacuzzi Boys	Double Vision	2013
Hunx & His Punx	Street Punk	2013
Jacuzzi Boys	Jacuzzi Boys	2013
The Beets	Play Silver Nickels and Golden Dimes Single	2013
La Luz	It's Alive	2013
V/A	Amazon Sampler	2013
La Luz	Damp Face EP	2013
Gem Club	In Roses	2014
Tacocat	NVM	2014
Protomartyr	Under Color Of Official Right	2014
La Sera	Hour of the Dawn	2014
S	Cool Choices	2014
Colleen Green	I Want to Grow Up	2015
Chastity Belt	Time to Go Home	2015
Grave Babies	Holographic Violence	2015
La Luz	Weirdo Shrine	2015
Protomartyr	A Half of Seven	2015
Protomartyr	The Agent Intellect	2015
Gazebos	Die Alone	2016
Tacocat	Lost Time	2016
La Luz	Damp Face EP (vinyl)	2016
IAN SWEET	IAN SWEET EP	2016
The Julie Ruin	Hit Reset	2016
Jenn Champion	No One EP	2016
IAN SWEET	Shapeshifter	2016
The Moondoggies	Don't Be a Stranger (vinyl)	2016
Dude York	Sincerely	2017
Various Artists	Hardly Released: Bedroom Recordings, Demos, Rarities, Unreleased and Widely Ignored Material	2017
Chastity Belt	I Used to Spend So Much Time Alone	2017
Dick Stusso	In Heaven	2018
La Luz	Floating Features	2018
Jenn Champion	Single Rider	2018
Lala Lala	The Lamb	2018
Ian Sweet	Crush Crusher	2018
Dude York	Happy in the Meantime EP	2019
Shana Cleveland	Night of the Worm Moon	2019
Versing	10000	2019
Julia Shapiro	Perfect Version	2019
Girl Friday	Fashion Conman EP	2019
Dude York	Falling	2019
Jenn Champion	Turn Up the Radio	2019
Chastity Belt	Chastity Belt	2019
Lala Lala	Sleepyhead	2019
Whitmer Thomas	Songs from the Golden One	2020
Lala Lala	I Want the Door to Open	2021
