= Shabazz Palaces discography =

- Studio albums: 8
- EPs: 3
- Live albums: 3
- Music videos: 26
- Remixes: 8
- Guest appearances: 20

The discography of Shabazz Palaces, an American experimental hip hop group, consists of eight studio albums, three EPs, and three live albums.

== Albums ==
=== Studio albums ===
List of studio albums, with selected details and chart positions
Title	Album details	Peak chart positions	
Title	Album details	US	US R&B/HH
Black Up	Released: June 28, 2011; Label: Sub Pop; Format: Vinyl, CD, digital download	—	38
Lese Majesty	Released: July 29, 2014; Label: Sub Pop; Formats: Vinyl, CD, digital download	58	10
Quazarz: Born on a Gangster Star	Released: July 14, 2017; Label: Sub Pop; Format: Vinyl, CD, digital download	—	—
Quazarz vs. the Jealous Machines	Released: July 14, 2017; Label: Sub Pop; Format: Vinyl, CD, digital download	—	—
The Don of Diamond Dreams	Released: April 17, 2020; Label: Sub Pop; Format: Vinyl, CD, digital download	—	—
Robed in Rareness	Released: October 27, 2023; Label: Sub Pop; Formats: Vinyl, CD, digital download	—	—
Exotic Birds of Prey	Released: March 29, 2024; Label: Sub Pop; Formats: Vinyl, CD, digital download	—	—
It's a Style Sport	Released: October 23, 2026; Label: Sub Pop; Formats: Vinyl, CD, digital download	—	—

=== Live albums ===
LIst of live albums, with selected details
Title	Album details
Live at Sasquatch 2010	Released: January 12, 2011; Label: Self-released; Format: Digital download
Live at KEXP	Released: April 21, 2012; Label: Sub Pop; Format: Vinyl
Live at Third Man Records	Released: June 3, 2016; Label: Third Man; Format: Vinyl, digital download

== Extended plays ==
List of EPs, with selected details
Title	EP details
Shabazz Palaces	Released: June 2009; Label: Self-released; Format: Vinyl, CD, digital download
Of Light	Released: July 2009; Label: Self-released; Format: Vinyl, CD, digital download
Illusions Ago (with Lavarr the Starr)	Released: April 14, 2023; Label: Glass Cane Records; Format: Vinyl, CD, digital download

== Guest appearances ==
List of non-single guest appearances, with other performing artists, showing year released and album name
Title	Year	Artist(s)	Album
"A Toast to Frame and Ro"	2012	Chimurenga Renaissance	Pungwe
"Hide Me"	2013	Flying Lotus	Ideas+drafts+loops
"Earthee"	2015	ThEESatisfaction	Earthee
"Recognition"	2015	ThEESatisfaction	Earthee
"Everybody [Interlude]"	2017	Porter Ray	Watercolor
"Sacred Geometry [Constellation Mix]"	2017	Porter Ray	Watercolor
"Crime Lords"	2018	Sunny Levine	Notions
"Actually Virtual"	2019	Flying Lotus	Flamagra
"Aquacode Databreaks"	2019	Clipping	The Deep
"IZM"	2019	Battles	Juice B Crypts
"Trust the Order"	2020	BSA Gold	Saturn Return
"Clouds"	2021	Jarv Dee and Bad Colors	BLAKHOUSE
"All These Cats"	2022	BSA Gold and Nikko Gray	Tone Poems for Mysterious Times
"Dreamishappening"	2022	Carlos Niño	Extra Presence
"Going Up"	2023	Kassa Overall and Lil B	ANIMALS
"Cool Out"	2023	The Musalini and 9th Wonder	Don & Eye 2
"Flyest Palaces"	2024	O Finess and 2WO OFFISHAL	Whores Antidote
"Deliveries"	2025	80 Empire and Doodlebug	A Galactic Love Supreme
"Mail Clerk"	2026	Nappy Nina and Swarvy	Sow & So
"Orange Lazarus"	2026	The Difference Machine, Day Tripper and Dr. Conspiracy	Some of Us Never Die

== Remixes ==
Year	Artist	Song(s)	Release
2011	Spoek Mathambo	"Put Some Red On It" (Shabazz Palaces Remix)	Put Some Red On It
2012	Spank Rock	"Car Song" (Shabazz Palaces Remix)	E. I. B. A. E. I. A. F. L. (Remixes)
2012	Battles	"White Electric" (Shabazz Palaces Remix)	Dross Glop
2012	Lushlife	"Hale-Bopp Was the Bedouins" (Shabazz Palaces Remix, featuring Heems, Palaceer, Fly Guy Dai & Thadillac)	—N/a
2013	Animal Collective	"New Town Burnout" (Shabazz Palaces Remix)	Monkey Been to Burn Town
2014	Adult Jazz	"Springful" (Shabazz Palaces Remix)	—N/a
2017	Gonjasufi	"Afrikan Spaceship - Shabazz Palaces Rework"	Mandela Effect
2025	80 Empire, Doodlebug, Swifty McVay	"Deliveries - Remix"	Deliveries
