= Alan Goldsher =

American author and musician

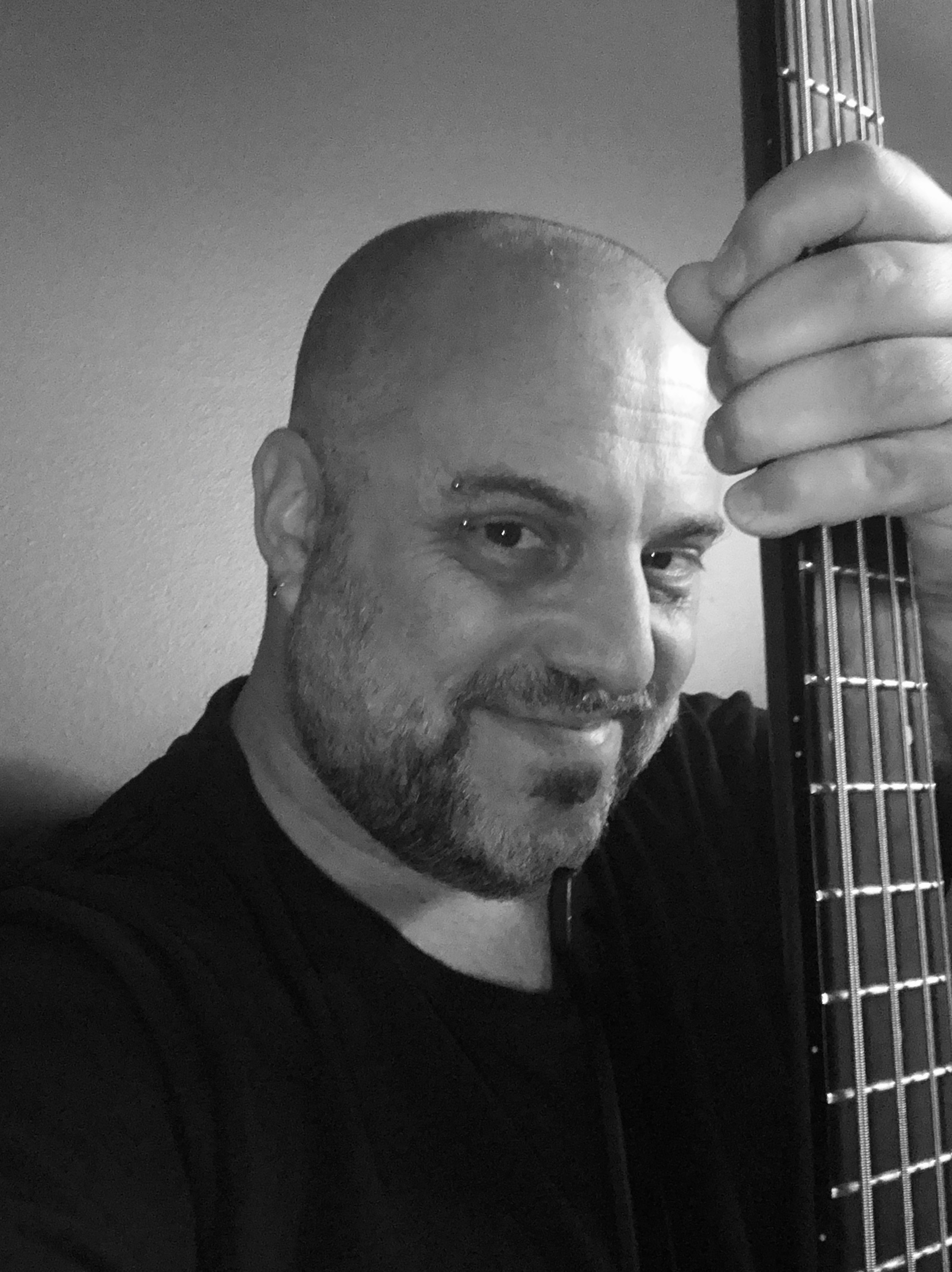
Alan Goldsher

Alan Goldsher is an American author of 15 books, performs on bass and keyboard, and is a music and sports journalist. He lives in Chicago.

== Writing ==
Goldsher has written 15 books, both fiction and non-fiction. His debut novel, Jam, was published in 2002, with the non-fiction Hard Bop Academy: The Sidemen of Art Blakey and the Jazz Messengers appearing the following year. His 2010 novel Paul Is Undead: The British Zombie Invasion received a starred review from Publishers Weekly, where it was described as a "humor-filled splatterfest" having "over-the-top bizarro charm".

As a ghostwriter, Alan has collaborated on numerous non-fiction and fiction projects with celebrities and public figures including comedian Kevin Pollak, director Tobe Hooper, chef Stephanie Izard, and jazz guitarist and vocalist George Benson. His music journalism has been published in Bass Player and Guitar Player, and his sportswriting has appeared in ESPN The Magazine and at ESPN.com, NBA.com, and ChicagoBulls.com.

Alan has written the text for two Running Press publications in the "RP Minis" series: Desktop Surfing and Desktop Tetherball.

== Music ==
A bassist, keyboardist, producer, and record label CEO, Goldsher has released 12 projects on his own Gold Note Records. As a sideman, he has made music with artists including Digable Planets, Cypress Hill, Naughty By Nature, Janet Jackson, Questlove, and King Britt.

== Discography ==
=== As a leader ===
==== Albums & EPs ====
- A Soundtrack in Search of a Movie (2023)
- Live at the Lakeview Lounge (2022)
- Greatest Hits, Vol. 1: Originals (2021)
- Greatest Hits, Vol. 2: Covers (2021)
- The Electronica Messenger: An EDM Tribute to Art Blskey (2021)
- All We Are (2021)
- Where's Dinner? (2021)
- Digits (2021)
- Glue (2020)
- Still Sticky (2020)
- Big Al Bassman Funks Up the Jazz Classics (2019)
- 96 B.P.M. (2019)
- The Other Pocket (2019)
- The Pocket (2019)

==== Singles ====
- "Una Noche Con Frances" (2021)
- "Spiral Dance" (2021)
- "F = Funk" (2021)
- "The Return of Vibez McGoo" (2020)
- "Eric B is President" (2020)
- "The Point After" (2020)
- "The Boogoo Reboot" (2020)
- "Jean-Pierre" (2020)
- "The Rumproller" (2020)
- "Ruby Red" (2020)
- "Witch Hunt / Maiden Voyage" (2020)

=== As a sideman ===
- Beyond the Spectrum: The Creamy Spy Chronicles by Digable Planets (2005)
- When the Funk Hits the Fan by King Britt (1998)
- Pronounced Jah-Nay by Zhané (1997)
- Blowout Comb by Digable Planets (1994)

== Bibliography ==
=== Non-fiction ===
- Digging Dave Brubeck and Time Out! – Post Hill Press, 2020
- Linsanity: The Improbable Rise of Jeremy Lin – Vook, 2012
- Modest Mouse: A Pretty Good Read – Thomas Dunne/St. Martin's Press, 2006
- Hard Bop Academy: The Sidemen of Art Blakey and the Jazz Messengers – Hal Leonard, 2003

=== Fiction ===
- "My Favorite Fangs: The Story of the Von Trapp Family Vampires" – Thomas Dunne/St. Martin's Press, 2012
- "A Game of Groans: A Sonnet of Slush and Soot" (as George R.R. Washington) – Thomas Dunne/St. Martin's Press, 2012
- "Paul Is Undead: The British Zombie Invasion – Gallery Books/Simon & Schuster, 2010
- "No Ordinary Girl" (as A. M. Goldsher) – Little Black Dress Books/Hachette, 2010
- "Today's Special" (as A. M. Goldsher) – Little Black Dress Books/Hachette, 2008
- "Reality Check" (as A. M. Goldsher) – Little Black Dress Books/Hachette, 2008
- "The True Naomi Story" (as A. M. Goldsher) – Little Black Dress Books/Hachette, 2008
- "Jam" – Permanent Press, 2002
