= 9th Wonder (Blackitolism) =

Single by Digable Planets

from the album Blowout Comb
- Released: 1994
- Genre: Jazz rap
- Length: 4:28
- Label: Pendulum, EMI

Digable Planets singles chronology
"Nickel Bags" (1993)	"9th Wonder (Blackitolism)" (1994)	"Dial 7 (Axiom of Creamy Spies)" (1994)

"9th Wonder (Blackitolism)" is a song by American hip hop trio Digable Planets, released in 1994 as the first single from their second album, Blowout Comb on Pendulum/EMI Records. The song peaked at No. 10 on the US Dance Club Songs chart, No. 8 on the US Billboard Hot Rap Songs chart and No. 37 on the US US Billboard Hot R&B/Hip-Hop Songs chart.

== Critical reception ==
Heidi Siegmund of the Los Angeles Times claimed 9th Wonder (Blackitolism) "finds the group digging into and exposing the psyche of Urban America deeper than any of their west coast counterparts, without making any pat conclusions." Mosi Reeves of Rolling Stone, in a review of the song's parent album, also noted "brittle, distorted bass drums and crashing cymbals". With this review appearing upon the magazine's 200 Greatest Hip Hop Albums of All Time, where Blowout Comb placed at No. 81 on this list.

== Credits ==
- Bass – Carl Carter
- Co-producer – Dave Darlington
- Producer, Arranger – Digable Planets

Assistant Engineer – Jack Hersca Second Engineer – Dexter Simmons

- Producer – Brenda Dash, Dennis Wheeler
- Featuring – Jazzy Joyce
- Guitar – Huey Cox
- Keyboards – Dave Darlington
- Mastering – Tom Coyne
- Mixing – Dave Darlington*
- Backup Vocals – Lavish, Dave The Prince, Mood Dude
