= Lese Majesty (album) =

Studio album by Shabazz Palaces
- Released: July 29, 2014
- Recorded: 2012–2014
- Genres: Experimental hip-hop; conscious hip-hop
- Length: 44:53
- Label: Sub Pop
- Producer: Shabazz Palaces

Shabazz Palaces chronology
Live at KEXP (2012)	Lese Majesty (2014)	Quazarz: Born on a Gangster Star (2017)

Lese Majesty is the second studio album by American hip-hop duo Shabazz Palaces, released on July 29, 2014. The album features contributions from Thee Satisfaction’s Catherine Harris-White, Erik Blood and Thadillac. The album was produced by Shabazz Palaces and mixed by Blood at Protect and Exalt Labs in Seattle.

== Background ==
In an interview with Hypetrak in February 2013, Palaceer Lazaro announced he and Maraire were working on a second album. Of the record's sound, he said "I don't know. I doubt that it will sound much like it. It will probably sound… I don't know. We've left that. That [last album] is kind of far behind us now. There will be some similarities I guess, because we are who we are. Other than that, it's not gonna sound much like it at all."

The album was first premiered at Seattle's Pacific Science Center Laser Dome in April 2014.

== Reception ==
Professional ratings
Aggregate scores
Source	Rating
AnyDecentMusic?	7.9/10
Metacritic	81/100
Review scores
Source	Rating
AllMusic	5/5 stars
The A.V. Club	A−
Entertainment Weekly	B+
The Guardian	4/5 stars
The Irish Times	4/5 stars
NME	8/10
Pitchfork	8.2/10
Q	3/5 stars
Rolling Stone	3.5/5 stars
Spin	9/10

Lese Majesty has received acclaim from music critics. At Metacritic, which assigns a normalized rating out of 100 to reviews from mainstream critics, the album received an average score of 81, which indicates "universal acclaim", based on 36 reviews.

AllMusic critic David Jeffries wrote: "With Lazaro frequently falling back on his warm and welcoming Butterfly-era flow, the album balances the avant with the approachable in a manner few others would even attempt." Jeffries further stated: "It's a shame that such a vanguard effort is weakened by a few clever and jokey interludes that don't warrant a return, but that just leaves Shabazz Palaces room for a proper masterpiece as the brilliant Lese Majesty is so very close." Paula Mejia of The A.V. Club stated that the record "spans universes, sonically and otherwise," and is "Butler's most extreme refusal of the hip-hop status quo, boasting erratic instrumentals and subtle shit-talk toward haters subverting the canon." Reviewing for Entertainment Weekly, Kyle Anderson thought that "the slightly-loosened-up attitude helps turn shambolic backdoor bangers such as "They Come in Gold" into intimate headphone masterpieces." The Guardian critic Alexis Petridis stated: "As it is, not every experiment on Lese Majesty works, but when they do, the results are spectacular. And even when they don't, the lovely sense that you're listening to an album genuinely unlike any other is pretty overwhelming."

The Irish Times's Jim Carroll called the record "a brave, trancey, psych flow of sounds that never tires or runs awry." NME critic Louis Pattison described the record as "one with the confidence to reject tired old models and build its own future logic," further stating the result to be "mysterious, spiritual, and funky as shit." Craig Jenkins of Pitchfork wrote: "The soul of Shabazz Palaces is pairing next-gen sounds with classic brass-tacks show-and-prove emceeing, and Lese Majesty tugs those extremes as far as they've ever been pulled; that it never shows signs of wear speaks to the strength of the bond." Writing for Rolling Stone, Will Hermes remarked that "Butler's dazzling feel for 21st-century psychedelia pushes this [record] well past nostalgia tripping – and while the verbal abstraction gets thick, there's serious pleasure in plumbing it." Spin's Anupa Mistry regarded the album as "more sonically relaxed and triumphant" than the group's past two records and stated: "In mirroring and transcending the schizoid, rootless form of digital society, it's an attempt to help people cope with the culture." Speaking on the live premiere of the album at Seattle's Pacific Science Center Laser Dome, The Stranger critic Mike Force wrote: "There was no need for drugs, or even the dazzling light show, since the music's fathoms-deep dubscapes and strategically predatory beats equaled the angular and smoky psychedelic visuals—each track already dazzled by a universe of deep-space stars, clouds of galactic gases, and the bright trails of wandering balls of ice."

=== Year-end lists ===
Lese Majesty on year-end lists
Publication	Accolade	Rank	Ref.
Fact Magazine	Top 50 Albums of 2014	32	
Flavorwire	Top 30 Albums of 2014	26	
Gorilla vs. Bear	Top 35 Albums of 2014	1	
The Guardian	Top 40 Albums of 2014	32	
Passion of the Weiss	Top 50 Albums of 2014	14	
Pitchfork	Top 50 Albums of 2014	35	
Slant Magazine	Top 25 Albums of 2014	16	
Sputnikmusic	Top 50 Albums of 2014	28	
The Wire	Top 50 Albums of 2014	7	

== Track listing ==
Suite 1: The Phasing Shift
No.	Title	Length
1.	"Dawn in Luxor"	3:56
2.	"Forerunner Foray"	3:48
3.	"They Come in Gold"	3:22

Suite 2: Touch & Agree
No.	Title	Length
4.	"Solemn Swears"	1:32
5.	"Harem Aria"	1:58
6.	"Noetic Noiromantics"	1:35

Suite 3
No.	Title	Length
7.	"The Ballad of Lt. Maj. Winnings"	1:42

Suite 4: Palace War Council Meeting
No.	Title	Length
8.	"Soundview"	0:40
9.	"Ishmael"	4:35
10.	"…down 155th in the MCM Snorkel"	2:12

Suite 5: Pleasure Milieu
No.	Title	Length
11.	"Divine of Form"	0:39
12.	"#CAKE"	4:02

Suite 6: Federal Bureau Boys
No.	Title	Length
13.	"Colluding Oligarchs"	2:09
14.	"Suspicion of a Shape"	1:41

Suite 7: High Climb to the Gallows
No.	Title	Length
15.	"MindGlitch Keytar TM Theme"	1:22
16.	"Motion Sickness"	3:49

Suite 8: Murkings on the Oxblood Starway
No.	Title	Length
17.	"New Black Wave"	3:43
18.	"Sonic MythMap for the Trip Back"	2:08

Sub Pop pre-order bonus 7"
No.	Title	Length
1.	"Palace Slide"	4:02
2.	"Palace Slide" (instrumental)	4:02

== Personnel ==
Album personnel as adapted from liner notes:

- Shabazz Palaces – performer, producer
- Knife Knights – mixing
- Nep Sidhu – art direction
- Todd Westendorp – artwork

== Charts ==
Chart performance for Lese Majesty
Chart (2014)	Peak position
US Billboard 200	58
US Independent Albums (Billboard)	7
US Top R&B/Hip-Hop Albums (Billboard)	10
