= Trip the Light Fantastic =

To trip the light fantastic is to dance nimbly or lightly, or to move in a pattern to musical accompaniment

Trip the Light Fantastic may refer to:

- "Tripping the Light Fantastic", a 1995 song by BT from Ima
- Tripping the Light Fantastic (album), 1997, by Lit
- Trip the Light Fantastic (Ladybug Mecca album), 2005
- Trip the Light Fantastic (Sophie Ellis-Bextor album), 2007
- "Trip a Little Light Fantastic", a 2018 song from the film Mary Poppins Returns
- "Trip the Light Fantastic", a 2021 song by Greta Van Fleet from The Battle at Garden's Gate
- "Tripping the Lights Fantastic", a 2025 musical piece by Michael Giacchino from The Fantastic Four: First Steps (Original Motion Picture Soundtrack)

== See also ==
- Light Fantastic (disambiguation)
- Tripping the Live Fantastic, a 1990 album by Paul McCartney
