= God Sound =

Studio album by Boogiemonsters
- Released: June 17, 1997
- Recorded: 1996–1997
- Genre: Hip hop
- Length: 58:02
- Label: Pendulum
- Producers: Boogiemonsters, Domingo

Boogiemonsters chronology
| Riders of the Storm: The Underwater Album (1994) | God Sound (1997) |

God Sound is the second album by the American rap group Boogiemonsters, released in 1997. It was produced by the group and Domingo. It was Boogiemonsters' final album.

The album peaked at No. 47 on the Top R&B/Hip-Hop Albums chart and No. 15 on the Top Heatseekers chart. A single, "Beginning of the End", reached No. 89 on the Hot R&B Singles chart and No. 39 on the Hot Rap Singles chart.

== Critical reception ==
Professional ratings
Review scores
| Source | Rating |
|---|---|
| The Commercial Appeal | 3/4 stars |

The Washington Informer wrote that "these brothers hit you in the head with common sense and a little Christianity ... the music is hip-hop divinity with a mature voice." The Commercial Appeal thought that "while taking a Book of Revelations view, the group's musings on 'The Beginning of the End, 'Behold a Pale Horse' and 'Sodom & Gomorrah' reflect the current, apocalyptic trend in gangsta rap."

== Track listing ==
1. "Intro" – 1:48
2. "The Beginning of the End" – 3:45
3. "God Sound" – 4:43
4. "...And Then What?" – 1:50
5. "Say Word" – 4:30
6. "Mark of the Beast II" – 4:41
7. "Hot Water in the Wilderness" – 2:25
8. "M.C." – 2:42
9. "Bodya" – 3:29
10. "Behold a Pale Horse" – 3:26
11. "Photographic Memory" – 2:46
12. "Sodom & Gomorrah" – 3:28
13. "The Lunchroom Table" – 3:05
14. "Whoever You AR, Wherever You AR" – 4:03
15. "Whistles in the Wind" – 5:05
16. "Warning" – 2:16
