= Ishmael Butler =

American rapper and record producer (born 1969)

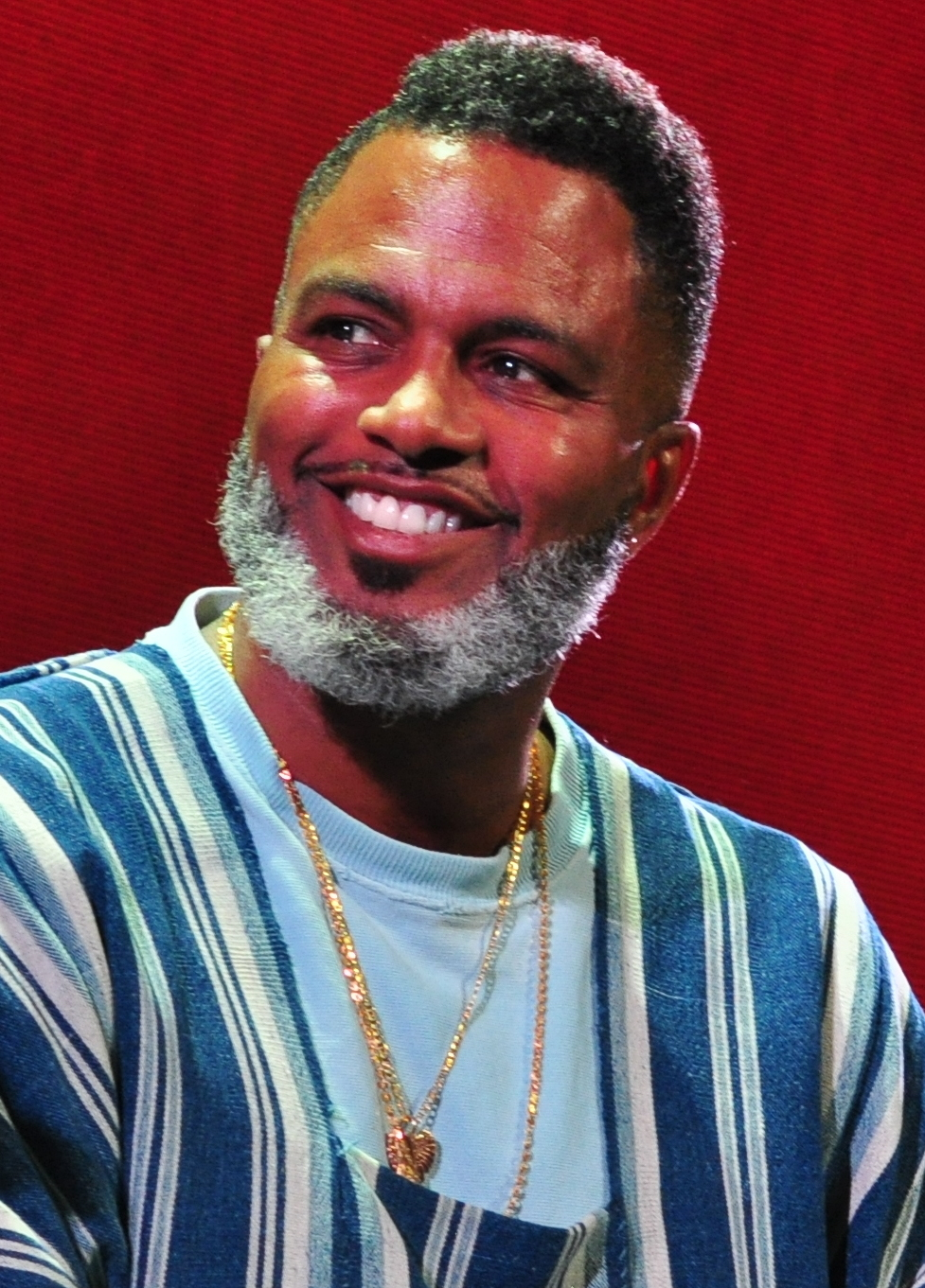
- Butler in 2019

Background information
- Also known as: Butterfly; Palaceer Lazaro; Cherrywine; Lavarr the Starr
- Born: Ishmael Reginald Butler; July 3, 1969 (age 57); Seattle, Washington, U.S.
- Genres: Hip hop, alternative hip hop
- Occupations: Rapper; record producer; songwriter
- Instrument: Vocals
- Years active: 1987–present
- Labels: Pendulum; Blue Note; EMI; Sub Pop; Brainfeeder
- Member of: Digable Planets; Shabazz Palaces

Ishmael Reginald Butler (born July 3, 1969) is an American rapper, songwriter and record producer. As Butterfly, he is a founding member of the hip-hop trio Digable Planets; as Palaceer Lazaro, he is the founder and principal creative figure behind the experimental hip-hop project Shabazz Palaces. Digable Planets won a Grammy Award in 1994 for the single "Rebirth of Slick (Cool Like Dat)". Butler has also recorded as Cherrywine and with producer Erik Blood as Knife Knights.

== Early life ==
Butler was born in Seattle, Washington, in 1969 and grew up in the city's Central District. His father, Reginald D. Butler, was a historian who later served as director of the Carter G. Woodson Institute for African-American and African Studies at the University of Virginia.

Butler studied saxophone at Meany Middle School and attended Garfield High School, where he played basketball. He graduated in 1987 and went on to play college basketball at the University of Massachusetts Amherst. He subsequently left university to pursue music.

== Career ==
=== Digable Planets (1990s) ===
After moving to Brooklyn, New York, Butler formed Digable Planets with Craig "Doodlebug" Irving and Mary Ann "Ladybug Mecca" Vieira. Performing as Butterfly, Butler was a rapper and producer in the trio, whose music combined jazz samples, hip-hop rhythms and lyrics addressing social and political subjects.

Digable Planets released their debut album, Reachin' (A New Refutation of Time and Space), in 1993. Its single "Rebirth of Slick (Cool Like Dat)" became a hit and won the Grammy Award for Best Rap Performance by a Duo or Group at the 36th Annual Grammy Awards in 1994; the group was also nominated for Best New Artist. The group's second album, Blowout Comb (1994), incorporated a more overtly political approach and was later the subject of critical reappraisal and reissue.

The trio split in the mid-1990s. Digable Planets reunited for a European and North American tour in 2005 and performed intermittently until 2011. The original trio reunited again in December 2015 and resumed regular touring in 2016, subsequently releasing the live album Digable Planets Live in 2017.

=== Film studies and acting (late 1990s–2004) ===
Following Digable Planets' initial breakup, Butler continued recording music, including material intended for a solo album that remained unreleased. He also studied film at New York University for approximately a year, taking acting classes and working on student films.

Butler starred opposite Aunjanue Ellis-Taylor in dream hampton's short drama I Am Ali (2002), playing a man experiencing serious mental illness. He subsequently played the character Ish opposite Bonz Malone in Mad Matthewz's independent feature Men Without Jobs (2004). The film has also circulated under the title Planet Brooklyn.

=== Cherrywine (early 2000s) ===
In the early 2000s, Butler developed Cherrywine in Seattle with guitarist Thaddeus Turner and bassist Gerald "Tugboat" Turner. The group's music drew on funk, rock and hip-hop as well as Butler's growing interest in live instrumentation. A promotional Cherrywine single appeared in 2002; the group released the album Bright Black in May 2003. The project followed several years in which Butler recorded music that was not commercially released.

=== Shabazz Palaces (2009–present) ===
Butler established Shabazz Palaces in Seattle in 2009, initially issuing the self-released EPs Shabazz Palaces and Of Light under the name Palaceer Lazaro. The releases appeared with little identifying information about the musicians. The project signed to Sub Pop, which released its debut studio album, Black Up, in 2011.

During the project's early years, Butler performed live with percussionist Tendai "Baba" Maraire, and the act was commonly described in contemporary coverage as a duo. Maraire also supplied percussion to some recordings. Butler has described himself as the originator of the beats and initial musical ideas for Shabazz Palaces, which he developed in the studio with longtime collaborator, producer and engineer Erik Blood. In a 2020 interview, Butler said that although Maraire's playing brought another rhythmic dimension to particular tracks, he had composed the underlying music throughout the project's history.

Shabazz Palaces' second album, Lese Majesty, appeared in 2014. The project combined experimental hip-hop with electronic music, jazz and science-fiction imagery. In July 2017, Butler released two connected Shabazz Palaces albums, Quazarz: Born on a Gangster Star and Quazarz vs. the Jealous Machines, centred on a fictional visitor observing a dystopian society.

Maraire was no longer performing with Shabazz Palaces by the release of The Don of Diamond Dreams in April 2020. Butler continued to record under the Shabazz Palaces name with Blood and other collaborators.

The shorter releases Robed in Rareness (2023) and Exotic Birds of Prey (2024) were followed by the eighth Shabazz Palaces studio album, It's a Style Sport, released on October 23, 2026. Butler and Blood produced the album, drawing on musicians who had performed in the Shabazz Palaces and Digable Planets touring ensembles, including Thaddeus Turner, Evan Flory-Barnes, Gerald Turner, Kassa Overall and Carlos Overall.

=== Other work ===
In 2013, Butler joined Sub Pop's A&R team, working on identifying and developing artists for the label. His work in this role included helping to sign Seattle rapper Porter Ray.

In September 2015, Butler's Shabazz Palaces project joined Flying Lotus and Thundercat in a collaborative group called WOKE. Their single "The Lavishments of Light Looking", featuring George Clinton, was released as part of the Adult Swim Singles Program. Flying Lotus said that WOKE originated as a proposed feature film intended to star Butler and musician Jeremiah Jae; he subsequently developed music with Butler after the film project stalled. Their collaboration also yielded "Actually Virtual", credited to Flying Lotus featuring Shabazz Palaces, on his 2019 album Flamagra.

Butler and producer Erik Blood also record together as Knife Knights. Their album 1 Time Mirage was released by Sub Pop in September 2018.

Butler is a founding member of the Black Constellation, a Seattle-based collective of musicians and visual artists whose work has included exhibitions and public performances. He was an artist in residence at Seattle's Henry Art Gallery in 2021.

In 2023, Butler's Glass Cane Records released Illusions Ago, credited to Lavarr the Starr. In an interview that year, Butler described LaVarr as a young musician whom he had met outside a concert in Detroit and whose recordings he had helped develop and release. However, in a March 2024 announcement for the Shabazz Palaces song "Take Me to Your Leader", Sub Pop explicitly identified Lavarr the Starr as an alter ego of Butler. The name appears as a featured credit on both that track and "Cinnamon Bun" from Robed in Rareness.

In 2024, Butler appeared in the short film Last Dawn of the 6th, directed by Stephan Gray.

== Personal life ==
Butler is the father of rapper Lil Tracy, born Jazz Butler, whose mother is singer Coko of the R&B group SWV.

== Discography ==
=== With Digable Planets ===
- Reachin' (A New Refutation of Time and Space) (1993)
- Blowout Comb (1994)
- Digable Planets Live (2017; live album)

=== With Cherrywine ===
- Bright Black (2003)

=== With Shabazz Palaces ===
- Shabazz Palaces (2009; EP)
- Of Light (2009; EP)
- Black Up (2011)
- Lese Majesty (2014)
- Quazarz: Born on a Gangster Star (2017)
- Quazarz vs. the Jealous Machines (2017)
- The Don of Diamond Dreams (2020)
- Robed in Rareness (2023; mini-album)
- Exotic Birds of Prey (2024; mini-album)
- It's a Style Sport (2026)

=== With Knife Knights ===
- 1 Time Mirage (2018)

=== Credited to Lavarr the Starr ===
- Illusions Ago (2023)

== Filmography ==
Year	Title	Role	Notes
2002	I Am Ali	Lead role	Short film directed by dream hampton
2004	Men Without Jobs	Ish	Also released as Planet Brooklyn
2024	Last Dawn of the 6th	Man	Short film directed by Stephan Gray
