= Riders of the Storm: The Underwater Album =

Studio album by Boogiemonsters
- Released: August 9, 1994
- Recorded: 1993–1994
- Genre: Hip hop
- Length: 58:42
- Label: Pendulum/EMI
- Producers: D!, Boogiemonsters

Boogiemonsters chronology
Riders of the Storm: The Underwater Album (1994)	God Sound (1997)

Riders of the Storm: The Underwater Album is the debut album by rap group Boogiemonsters. It was released on August 9, 1994, through EMI America Records. The album was produced by Boogiemonsters and was one of the first albums to feature session work from Scott Storch. The album peaked at No. 42 on the Top R&B/Hip-Hop Albums and No. 19 on the Top Heatseekers and spawned two charting singles: "Recognized Thresholds of Negative Stress" peaked at No. 65 on the Hot R&B/Hip-Hop Singles & Tracks and No. 19 on the Hot Rap Singles, while "Strange" peaked at No. 43 on the Hot Rap Singles. The album's cover art is inspired by the 1965 album Soul Sauce by vibraphonist Cal Tjader.

== Lyricism and music ==
Intending to bring substance to hip hop, Boogiemonsters wrote songs which they felt would add depth to the genre's lyricism, including "Old Man Jacob's Well," which portrayed a child murderer who believes that he is helping children "by taking them out of this evil world." Another example of this lyricism was found in "Recognized Thresholds of Negative Stress," which promotes what the group believed were "the benefits of having a carefree spirit."

Group member Ivor Myers cited Jim Morrison, Pearl Jam, Nirvana, De La Soul, A Tribe Called Quest, Yellowman and Bob Marley as influences on the album's music. The group intended to combine these musical influences with a form of abstract spirituality which combined elements of Christianity, Rastafari, Eastern mysticism and African religions to form the content of the album's lyrics.

== Critical reception ==
Professional ratings
Review scores
Source	Rating
AllMusic	2/5 stars
Tampa Bay Times	4/5 stars

The New York Times called the album "idiosyncratic, energetic and refreshingly underivative" and "full of head-bobbing pleasures and food for thought."

== Track listing ==
- All songs are written by Mondo McCann, Sean Pollard, Sean Myers, Ivor Myers and Derek Jackson.
1. "Jugganauts" – 5:14
2. "Recognized Thresholds of Negative Stress" – 5:41
3. "Boogie" – 3:53
4. "Muzic Appreciation" – 2:33
5. "Mark of the Beast" – 4:20
6. "Altered States of Consciousness" – 4:33
7. "Honeydips in Gotham" – 4:17
8. "Strange" – 4:04
9. "Old Man Jacob's Well" – 5:30
10. "Bronx Bombas" – 3:20
11. "Salt Water Taffy" – 4:24
12. "Riders of the Storm" – 5:03
13. "Recognized Thresholds of Negative Stress" (Stressless Mix) – 5:50

== Personnel ==
- Drum programming: D!, The LG Experience on "Boogie", "Honeydips in Gotham" and "Salt Water Taffy"
- Bass: Clinton Sands, Mike Tyler on "Juggaknots"
- Guitar: Mike Tyler
- Keyboards: Darren Lighty, Scott Storch
- Scratches: Lord Jazz
- Additional vocals: Cosmic Ray, Xtreem, Basic, Ajaru and Baba Wisdom
