= Awe Naturale =

Studio album by THEESatisfaction
- Released: March 27, 2012
- Genres: Hip hop; R&B; neo soul
- Length: 30:26
- Label: Sub Pop
- Producer: THEESatisfaction

THEESatisfaction chronology
Awe Naturale (2012)	Earthee (2015)

Awe Naturale (stylized as awE naturalE) is the debut studio album by THEESatisfaction. It was released by Sub Pop on March 27, 2012. Ishmael Butler provided vocals on "God" and "Enchantruss". A music video was created for "Queens".

== Critical reception ==
Professional ratings
Aggregate scores
Source	Rating
Metacritic	75/100
Review scores
Source	Rating
AllMusic	4.5/5 stars
Beats Per Minute	82%
Cokemachineglow	73%
Consequence of Sound	B
DIY	3.5/5 stars
NME	3.5/5 stars
Paste	6.8/10
Pitchfork	7.5/10
PopMatters	8/10 stars
Slant Magazine	3/5 stars

At Metacritic, which assigns a weighted average score out of 100 to reviews from mainstream critics, the album received an average score of 75, based on 26 reviews, indicating "generally favorable reviews".

Andy Kellman of AllMusic gave the album 4.5 out of 5 stars, writing, "Its stimulating combination of cerebral and seductive qualities makes for a grip that is tight and lasting." Robert Alford of PopMatters gave the album 8 out of 10 stars and commented that "perhaps the album's brevity is one of its strengths, as there are many great hip-hop albums out there that suffer from too much filler, too many interludes and the occasional total misfire."

MusicOMH placed it at number 62 on the "Top 100 Albums of 2012" list.

== Track listing ==
No.	Title	Length
1.	"Awe"	0:50
2.	"Bitch"	1:28
3.	"Earthseed"	2:34
4.	"Queens"	3:06
5.	"Existinct"	2:10
6.	"Deeper"	3:46
7.	"Sweat"	3:01
8.	"Juiced"	1:42
9.	"God"	3:15
10.	"Enchantruss"	2:51
11.	"Needs"	2:37
12.	"Crash"	1:00
13.	"Naturale"	2:06

== Charts ==
Chart	Peak position
US Top R&B/Hip-Hop Albums (Billboard)	62
US Heatseekers Albums (Billboard)	35
