= Robed in Rareness =

Studio album by Shabazz Palaces
- Released: October 27, 2023
- Studio: Studio4 West (Venice, California)
- Length: 24:00
- Label: Sub Pop
- Producer: Shabazz Palaces

Shabazz Palaces chronology
The Don of Diamond Dreams (2020)	Robed in Rareness (2023)	Exotic Birds of Prey (2024)

Robed in Rareness is the sixth studio album by American hip-hop project Shabazz Palaces, released on October 27, 2023 through Sub Pop. It includes collaborations with Royce the Choice, Lil Tracy, O Finess, and Geechi Suede of Camp Lo.

== Critical reception ==
Professional ratings
Aggregate scores
Source	Rating
Metacritic	71/100
Review scores
Source	Rating
AllMusic	3/5 stars
HipHopDX	3.7/5
Pitchfork	7.1/10
PopMatters	8/10
Slant Magazine	2/5 stars

Robed in Rareness received a score of 71 out of 100 on review aggregator Metacritic based on seven critics' reviews, indicating "generally favorable" reception. Arusa Qureshi of The Quietus wrote that Shabazz Palaces' "sound is pushed and pulled in multiple directions at once, without once neglecting the interplanetary funk mutant hip hop sound they have always excelled in" and called the album a "thesis on taking risks, with Butler inviting in a host of collaborators, all offering something different and, in some cases, a step away from the characteristic Shabazz Palaces sound". Paul Attard of Slant Magazine described Robed in Rareness as "the group's least substantial release to date" and felt that it "continues in th[e] stripped-down mode" of their prior two albums "and yet, it somehow still includes meandering material like the barely thought-out 'Scarface Mace' and the bland 'Hustle Crossers'". Attard concluded that the group are "running on fumes".

Stephen Kearse of Pitchfork wrote that "Butler and a team of close collaborators swagger across eras of rap" and felt that Butler's production is "icier and more metallic without Maraire's rhythmic touch; the arrangements don't swell, contract, and glow as intensely as those on Lese Majesty or the Quazarz albums. But that muted palette fits the cool, nocturnal mood". Reviewing the album for AllMusic, Andy Kellman found it to be Shabazz Palaces' "spaciest work" and "coolly distant rather than in your face" as its tracks are "rhythmically labyrinthine, unhurried in tempo, with clamping drums and cosmic synthesizers that burble, prance, and sometimes create a sense of menace".

== Track listing ==
All music is composed and arranged by Ishmael Butler.

Robed in Rareness track listing
No.	Title	Writer(s)	Length
1.	"Binoculars" (featuring Royce the Choice)		3:03
2.	"Woke Up in a Dream" (featuring Lil Tracy)		4:29
3.	"P Kicking G" (featuring Porter Ray)		3:36
4.	"Cinnamon Bun" (featuring Lavarr the Starr)		4:09
5.	"Scarface Mace" (featuring O Finess)	Butler; Dalton Knox; O Finess	2:40
6.	"Gel Bait" (featuring Geechi Suede)		3:13
7.	"Hustle Crossers"		2:50
Total length:			24:00

== Personnel ==
- Ishmael Butler – production, engineering
- Erik Blood – mixing, engineering
- Warren Defever – mastering
