= Light Fantastic =

Light Fantastic may refer to:

== Film and TV ==
- Light Fantastic (TV series), a BBC Four documentary television series about the history and discovery of light
- "The Light Fantastic", an episode of ABC Stage 67
- "The Light Fantastic", an episode of Pokémon

== Other ==
- The Light Fantastic, a satirical fantasy novel by Terry Pratchett
- The Light Fantastic, a Star Trek novel
- Light Fantastic (album), a 1999 album by Steve Roach

== See also ==
- Trip the light fantastic (disambiguation)
