= Trip the Light Fantastic (Ladybug Mecca album) =

Studio album by Ladybug Mecca
- Released: June 28, 2005
- Recorded: 2002–2005
- Genre: Hip hop, alternative, alternative hip-hop, pop, R&B, jazz, samba
- Label: Nu Paradigm
- Producer: Ladybug Mecca, Ayatollah, Chris Udell, Erik Rico, Git and Papo, Koproduced, Masauko Chipembere, Mr. Khaliyl, Sa-Ra, Shane X. Conry

Trip The Light Fantastic is the debut solo album from Ladybug Mecca, of hip-hop group Digable Planets. The album was released June 2005 on indie label Nu Paradigm.

== Production ==
Trip the Light Fantastic was produced by Ladybug Mecca, Erik Rico, Ayatollah, Sa-Ra and jazz musician Brian Jackson. She both raps and sings on this diverse album featuring samba, hip-hop, jazz, and rock.

== Critical reception ==
Dalia Cohen of Exclaim! wrote, "After almost a decade of silence from one of hip-hop's most beloved crews, Ladybug of Digable Planets is back with a solo debut. Long time Digable fans might be surprised to hear the new sounds of Ladybug. Trip the Light Fantastic is definitely not another Blowout Comb. This album is diversely beautiful; it's an aural documentation of Ladybug's journey through love, life, religion, spirituality and raising four kids. She represents lovely singing, scatting and rapping over rock, pop, hip-hop, samba, salsa, funk, soul, nu-jazz and electronic beats."

== Track listing ==
1. Dark Matter
2. Don't Disturb the Peace
3. Children Say
4. Ladybug Come Outside
5. Show the World
6. Mr. Mayor
7. Dogg Starr
8. Leaving It All Behind
9. Sexual Alchemy
10. Centre of Nowhere
11. Please Don't
12. Last Train (featuring Martin Luther)
13. Sweet & Polite
14. Suicidethol (Killufast Capsules) 100/mg
15. You Never Get Over It
16. Remember When?
17. Oh Poor You
18. Step Up Wise
19. If I Need to Move On (Sometimes) [bonus track]
