= Quazarz vs. the Jealous Machines =

Studio album by Shabazz Palaces
- Released: July 14, 2017
- Studios: Protect and Exalt Labs, A Black Space
- Genre: Rap
- Length: 42:15
- Label: Sub Pop
- Producer: Knife Knights

Shabazz Palaces chronology
| Quazarz: Born on a Gangster Star (2017) | Quazarz vs. the Jealous Machines (2017) | The Don of Diamond Dreams (2023) |

Professional ratings
Aggregate scores
| Source | Rating |
|---|---|
| Metacritic | 77/100 |
Review scores
| Source | Rating |
| AllMusic | 4/5 stars |
| Pitchfork | 7.9/10 |
| Under the Radar | 6/10 |

Quazarz vs. the Jealous Machines is the fourth studio album by American hip-hop duo Shabazz Palaces, released on July 14, 2017. The album was released simultaneously with and as a companion album to Quazarz: Born on a Gangster Star. The album features Fly Guy Dai, Chimurenga Renaissance, The Shogun Shot, Purple Tape Nate, and LAZ.

== Track listing ==
All music is composed by Palaceer Lazaro.

Quazarz vs. the Jealous Machines track listing
| No. | Title | Length |
|---|---|---|
| 1. | "Welcome to Quazarz" | 3:49 |
| 2. | "Gorgeous Sleeper Cell" | 2:14 |
| 3. | "Self-Made Follownaire" | 4:14 |
| 4. | "Atlaantis" | 2:18 |
| 5. | "Effeminence" (feat. Fly Guy Dai, Chimurenga Renaissance) | 5:42 |
| 6. | "Julian's Dream (Ode to a Bad)" (feat. The Shogun Shot) | 4:13 |
| 7. | "30 Clip Extension" | 5:08 |
| 8. | "Love in the Time of Kanye" (feat. Purple Tape Nate) | 2:19 |
| 9. | "Sabonim in the Saab on 'em" | 2:23 |
| 10. | "The SS Quintessence" | 3:40 |
| 11. | "Late Night Phone Calls" (feat. LAZ) | 3:25 |
| 12. | "Quazarz on 23rd" | 2:50 |
| Total length: | | 42:15 |

== Personnel ==
Adapted from AllMusic entry.

- Shabazz Palaces – performer
- Thaddillac – guitar, keyboards
- Amir Yaghmai – guitar, vocals
- Tendai Maraire – percussion, vocals
- John Kirby – keyboards
- Morgan Henderson – flute
- Stewart Levine – bass clarinet

Production

- The Palaceer Lazaro – producer
- Sunny Levine – mixing, producing, vocals
- Kamal Humphre – mixing
