= Boogiemonsters =

American rap group

- Origin: Petersburg, Virginia The Bronx, New York
- Genres: Hip hop
- Years active: 1993–1997
- Labels: Pendulum, EMI
- Past members: Vex; Mondo; Myntric; Yodared

Boogiemonsters were an American hip hop group composed by Bronx, New York rapper Mondo McCann, Alaskan-born Vex Da Vortex (Sean Pollard) and Jamaican-born brothers Myntric (Sean Myers) and Yodared (Ivor "Al" Myers).

== Biography ==
Vex, Myntric and Yodared met in high school in Virginia where their families had relocated from New York City. They formed a group and began performing together in talent shows. After graduation, Vex and Yodared attended Virginia State University while Myntric attended Virginia Union University. Fellow Virginia State student McCann was recruited into the group. The group performed at campus shows and won first place at Howard University's Hip-Hop Convention. They quickly landed a record deal with Pendulum/EMI and, in 1994, released Riders of the Storm: The Underwater Album.

After the release of the first album, the group became Seventh-day Adventists. Yodared and Myntric left the group as both felt that the hip hop lifestyle was not in line with their religious convictions. Yodared became the head pastor at the Templeton Hills Seventh-day Adventist Church in Templeton, California. Pendulum Records ceased operation and EMI was the sole record company for their second album, God Sound (a darker, mature, hardcore, and pious recording), was released in 1997. After that, appearances were sporadic on compilations and 12 inch singles. The group has disbanded since.

In 2008, member Vex Da Vortex released an instrumental album titled VEXSTRUMENTALS.

In January 2025, Vex Da Vortex announced the passing of former member Myntric on Instagram.

== Music, lyricism and influences ==
Boogiemonsters intended to bring depth to the lyrics of hip hop by writing lyrics with stronger substance. Riders of the Storm: The Underwater Album combined elements of abstract spirituality which combined elements of Christianity, Rastafari, Eastern mysticism and African religions to form the content of the album's lyrics; God Sound was more openly inspired by Christianity. Group member Ivor Myers has cited Jim Morrison, Pearl Jam, Nirvana, De La Soul, A Tribe Called Quest, Yellowman and Bob Marley as influences on the group's music.

== Discography ==
=== Studio albums ===
Year	Album	Chart Positions	
Year	Album	US Hip-Hop	US Heatseekers
1994	Riders of the Storm: The Underwater Album	42	19
1997	God Sound	47	15

=== Singles ===
- "Strange" (1994)
- "Recognized Thresholds of Negative Stress" (1994)
- "Honeydips in Gotham" (1995)
