= Exotic Birds of Prey =

Studio album by Shabazz Palaces
- Released: March 29, 2024
- Genre: Alternative hip-hop
- Length: 22:59
- Label: Sub Pop
- Producer: Shabazz Palaces

Shabazz Palaces chronology
Robed in Rareness (2023)	Exotic Birds of Prey (2024)	It's a Style Sport (2026)

The Floss Vibes of Shabazz Vol. 2: Exotic Birds of Prey (or simply Exotic Birds of Prey) is the seventh studio album by American hip-hop project Shabazz Palaces. It was released on March 29, 2024, via Sub Pop, serving as an accompanying mini-album to 2023's The Floss Vibes of Shabazz Vol. 1: Robed in Rareness. It features guest appearances from Cobra Coil, Irene Barber, Japreme Magnetic, Lavarr The Starr, OCnotes, Purple Tape Nate and Stas Thee Boss.

== Critical reception ==
Professional ratings
Aggregate scores
Source	Rating
Metacritic	67/100
Review scores
Source	Rating
AllMusic	3.5/5 stars
Pitchfork	7.1/10
PopMatters	7/10
RapReviews	5/10
Slant	3/5 stars
Sputnikmusic	2.4/5

Exotic Birds of Prey was met with generally favourable reviews from music critics. At Metacritic, which assigns a normalized rating out of 100 to reviews from mainstream publications, the album received an average score of 67, based on seven reviews.

Dylan Green of Pitchfork wrote: "as the geometric tones of closer "Take Me to Your Leader" blip and fold into themselves, it becomes clear that, short as it is, Exotic Birds of Prey still has the loose and expansive feel of a radio show. There's no easier way to visit outer space". AllMusic's Fred Thomas found the album "sounds like it's broadcasting live from an unknown galaxy, giving us an idea of what music will sound like on other planets in the future while nodding knowingly to some of Earth's most exciting sounds of the past". Christopher J. Lee of PopMatters stated: "following Robed in Rareness from last fall, Shabazz Palaces continues a provisional series with the cryptic and digressive Exotic Birds of Prey".

In mixed reviews, Nick Seip of Slant Magazine wrote: "at just seven tracks, the album proves to be paradoxically sparse in its loose, leisurely construction but dense in its intense inscrutability. Exotic Birds of Prey's resistance to form, accessibility, and interpretation will either draw you in or push you away—and that's probably the point". Daniel Kirby of RapReviews concluded: "it's difficult to gauge its direction, and it often seems aimless and forgettable, despite some interesting experiments here and there. Overall though, it's a continuation of their gradual decline since their stellar debut, resembling more a mixtape of half-formed ideas than a cohesive, fully realised project". Sputnikmusic staff reviewer wrote that "this is a disappointment would imply that greater was expected, but this has been Shabazz for a while, and its as low-effort, meandering and limp as anything from him in the past decade has been".

== Track listing ==
No.	Title	Length
1.	"Exotic BOP" (featuring Purple Tape Nate)	4:08
2.	"Angela" (featuring Irene Barber and Stas Thee Boss)	3:01
3.	"Myths of the Occult" (featuring Japreme Magnetic)	1:52
4.	"Goat Me" (featuring Cobra Coil)	4:36
5.	"Well Known Nobody" (featuring OCnotes)	1:03
6.	"Synth Dirt"	2:07
7.	"Take Me to Your Leader" (featuring Lavarr The Starr)	6:12
Total length:		22:59

== Personnel ==
- Shabazz Palaces – producer
  - Ishmael Butler – engineering
- Purple Tape Nate – featured artist (track 1)
- Irene Barber – featured artist (track 2)
- Stas Thee Boss – featured artist (track 2)
- Japreme Magnetic – featured artist (track 3)
- Cobra Coil – featured artist (track 4)
- Otis "OCnotes" Calvin III – featured artist (track 5)
- Lavarr The Starr – featured artist (track 7)
- Erik Blood – mixing, engineering
- Warren Defever – mastering
- Todd Westendorp – artwork
