= Reachin' (A New Refutation of Time and Space) =

Studio album by Digable Planets
- Released: February 9, 1993
- Recorded: 1992–1993
- Studios: Palatial Sound Doctor Studio & Resort (North Bergen, New Jersey)
- Genres: Alternative hip hop; jazz rap
- Length: 56:35
- Labels: Pendulum; Elektra
- Producers: Ishmael "Butterfly" Butler; Shane "The Doctor" Faber; Mike "Launching An Attack" Mangini

Digable Planets chronology
Reachin' (A New Refutation of Time and Space) (1993)	Blowout Comb (1994)

Singles from Reachin' (A New Refutation of Time and Space)
- 1. "Rebirth of Slick (Cool Like Dat)" Released: November 9, 1992; 2. "Where I'm From" Released: April 1993; 3. "Nickel Bags" Released: August 26, 1993

Reachin' (A New Refutation of Time and Space) is the debut studio album by alternative hip hop group Digable Planets released on February 9, 1993, by Pendulum/Elektra Records. The album has been certified Gold in the US by the RIAA.

== Production ==
The album was produced by Digable Planets' Ishmael Butler ("Butterfly") and features raps from Butler, Irving and Viera. The production leans heavily on jazz samples, Butler explaining that "it was all about resources, really...I just went and got the records that I had around me. And a lot of those were my dad's shit, which was lots of jazz. The whole concept of 'We're a jazz group' didn't go down like that. Except that DJ Premier was a big influence, and he sampled a lot of jazz."

Lyrically, the tone of the album is less overtly political than its successor Blowout Comb, but still touches on issues such as abortion rights ("La Femme Fetal") and the drug abuses of jazz musicians ("Last of the Spiddyocks"). The album title derives from A New Refutation of Time, an essay by Argentinian author Jorge Luis Borges, as well as the tendency of earlier jazz musicians in naming their albums (Moanin', Cookin', etc). Butler and Irving give a track-by-track account of the album and its production in Brian Coleman's book Check the Technique.

== Reception ==
Professional ratings
Review scores
Source	Rating
AllMusic	4.5/5 stars
Chicago Tribune	3.5/4 stars
Entertainment Weekly	B+
Los Angeles Times	3.5/4 stars
NME	8/10
Pitchfork	8.7/10
Rolling Stone	4/5 stars
The Rolling Stone Album Guide	3.5/5 stars
Spin Alternative Record Guide	9/10
The Village Voice	A

The single "Rebirth of Slick (Cool Like Dat)" became a hit in 1993, breaking into the Top 15 on the Billboard Hot 100 chart and winning Grammy Award for Best Rap Performance by a Duo or Group in 1994. In 1998, Reachin' was listed in The Source's 100 Best Rap Albums. In 2008, "Rebirth of Slick (Cool Like Dat)" was ranked number 62 on VH1's 100 Greatest Songs of Hip Hop. The song "Rebirth of Slick (Cool Like Dat)" was used for a Tide commercial in 2009.

== Track listing ==
All music is composed by Digable Planets.

No.	Title	Length
1.	"It's Good to Be Here"	5:06
2.	"Pacifics"	4:31
3.	"Where I'm From"	4:35
4.	"What Cool Breezes Do"	3:22
5.	"Time & Space (A New Refutation Of)"	3:33
6.	"Rebirth of Slick (Cool Like Dat)"	4:22
7.	"Last of the Spiddyocks"	4:28
8.	"Jimmi Diggin' Cats"	3:42
9.	"La Femme Fetal"	4:36
10.	"Escapism (Gettin' Free)"	3:24
11.	"Appointment at the Fat Clinic"	2:58
12.	"Nickel Bags"	3:19
13.	"Swoon Units"	4:00
14.	"Examination of What"	4:44

== Charts ==
=== Weekly charts ===
Chart (1993)	Peak position
Canadian Albums (RPM)	40
New Zealand Albums (RMNZ)	22
Swedish Albums (Sverigetopplistan)	50
US Billboard 200	15
US Top R&B/Hip-Hop Albums (Billboard)	5

=== Year-end charts ===
Chart (1993)	Position
US Top R&B/Hip-Hop Albums (Billboard)	34
