= Quazarz: Born on a Gangster Star =

Studio album by Shabazz Palaces
- Released: July 14, 2017
- Studios: Protect and Exalt Labs, A Black Space
- Genre: Rap
- Length: 35:21
- Label: Sub Pop
- Producer: Knife Knights

Shabazz Palaces chronology
Lese Majesty (2014)	Quazarz: Born on a Gangster Star (2017)	Quazarz vs. the Jealous Machines (2017)

Professional ratings
Aggregate scores
Source	Rating
Metacritic	77/100
Review scores
Source	Rating
AllMusic	3.5/5 stars
The Guardian	3/5 stars
Pitchfork	7.6/10

Quazarz: Born on a Gangster Star is the third studio album by American hip-hop duo Shabazz Palaces, released on July 14, 2017. The album was released simultaneously with and as a companion album to Quazarz vs. The Jealous Machines. The album features Thundercat, Loud Eyes Lou, The Palaceer Lazaro, and Darrius.

== Track listing ==
All music is composed by Palaceer Lazaro.

Quazarz: Born on a Gangster Star track listing
No.	Title	Length
1.	"Since C.A.Y.A."	3:54
2.	"When Cats Claw"	2:23
3.	"Shine a Light" (feat. Thaddillac)	2:42
4.	"Dèesse Du Sang"	3:30
5.	"Eel Dreams" (feat. Loud Eyes Lou)	2:46
6.	"Parallax" (feat. The Palaceer Lazaro)	2:31
7.	"Fine Ass Hairdresser"	3:05
8.	"The Neurochem Mixalogue"	4:17
9.	"That's How City Life Goes"	2:33
10.	"Moon Whip Quäz" (feat. Darrius)	5:14
11.	"Federalist Papers"	2:26
Total length:		35:21

== Personnel ==
- Thaddillac – guitar, synthesizer
- Erik Blood – bass guitar, mixing
- Thundercat – bass guitar on "Since C.A.Y.A."
