= Black Up =

Studio album by Shabazz Palaces
- Released: June 28, 2011
- Genre: Experimental hip-hop
- Length: 36:01
- Label: Sub Pop
- Producer: Knife Knights

Shabazz Palaces chronology
Live at Sasquatch 2010 (2011)	Black Up (2011)	Live at KEXP (2012)

Black Up is the debut studio album by American hip-hop duo Shabazz Palaces. It was released on June 28, 2011, in the United States on Sub Pop. The album was produced by Knife Knights at Gunbeat Serenade Studio in Outplace Palacelands."

== Reception ==
=== Critical reception ===
Professional ratings
Aggregate scores
Source	Rating
AnyDecentMusic?	8.2/10
Metacritic	83/100
Review scores
Source	Rating
AllMusic	4.5/5 stars
The A.V. Club	A
Entertainment Weekly	B−
The Guardian	4/5 stars
Los Angeles Times	4/4 stars
MSN Music (Expert Witness)	A−
NME	8/10
Pitchfork	8.8/10
Rolling Stone	3.5/5 stars
Spin	7/10

Black Up received widespread critical acclaim; many commented on the experimental song structures and intricate lyricism. Review aggregator Metacritic gave the album a normalised rating of 83 out of 100, based on reviews from 36 critics, indicating "universal acclaim". Metacritic included Black Up in its "Midyear Report: The Best Music of 2011 So Far."

In his review for MSN Music, music critic Robert Christgau said that, misleading titles notwithstanding, the album "improves mightily when the volume is high enough to break the beats into components so they're impossible to ignore." Jon Pareles, writing in The New York Times, viewed the album as proof that hip-hop "still has an audacious progressive fringe." Kitty Empire of The Observer wrote that, although it is not game-changing, Black Up resonate with listeners in a way the conventional hip-hop cannot because each track is "lean and muscular, never losing sight of the fact that hip-hop should writhe inexorably forward." In 2019, Pitchfork ranked Black Up at number 179 on their list of "The 200 Best Albums of the 2010s"; cultural critic Hanif Abdurraqib wrote: "From great mystery exploded an album of impossible vision."

=== Accolades ===
Black Up on year-end lists
Publication	Country	Accolade	Year	Rank
Mojo	UK	Top 50 albums of 2011	2011	36
PopMatters	US	75 Best Albums of 2011	2011	30
Pitchfork	US	Best Albums of 2011	2011	14
Pitchfork	US	The 200 Best Albums of the 2010s	2019	179
Hip Hop Is Read	US	Top 25 Hip Hop Albums of 2011	2011	10
Epitonic	US	Top 40 Albums of 2011	2011	4
Gorilla vs. Bear	US	Albums of 2011	2011	1
Gorilla vs. Bear	US	Albums of the Decade: 2010–2019	2019	5
Prefixmag	US	Top 50 Albums of 2011	2011	1
The Seattle Times	US	Best Pop Music 2011	2011	1
Potholes In My Blog	US	Top 15 Albums of 2011	2011	1
Cokemachineglow	US	Top 50 Albums of 2011	2011	1

== Track listing ==
Black Up track listing
No.	Title	Length
1.	"Free Press and Curl"	4:16
2.	"An Echo from the Hosts That Profess Infinitum"	3:15
3.	"Are You... Can You... Were You? (Felt)"	4:48
4.	"A Treatease Dedicated to the Avian Airess from North East Nubis (1000 Questions, 1 Answer)"	2:46
5.	"Youlogy"	3:59
6.	"Endeavors for Never (The Last Time We Spoke You Said You Were Not Here. I Saw You Though.)"	2:51
7.	"Recollections of the Wraith"	3:36
8.	"The King's New Clothes Were Made by His Own Hands"	2:07
9.	"Yeah You"	3:21
10.	"Swerve... The Reeping of All That Is Worthwhile (Noir Not Withstanding)"	5:10

== Personnel ==
Shabazz Palaces

- Ishmael Butler (a.k.a. Palaceer Lazaro) – vocals
- Tendai Maraire – instrumentation

Additional personnel

- THEESatisfaction – guest vocals
- Blood – mixing
- Dumb Eyes – artwork
- Knife Knights – production

== Charts ==
Chart performance for Black Up
Chart (2011)	Peak position
US Heatseekers Albums (Billboard)	4
US Independent Albums (Billboard)	33
US Top R&B/Hip-Hop Albums (Billboard)	38
US Top Rap Albums (Billboard)	23
US Indie Store Album Sales (Billboard)	23
