= Beyond the Spectrum: the Creamy Spy Chronicles =

Compilation album by Digable Planets
- Released: October 4, 2005
- Recorded: 1992–1994
- Genre: Alternative hip hop, jazz rap
- Label: Blue Note Records
- Producer: Ishmael Butler, Shane Faber, Michael Mangini, Dave Darlington

Beyond the Spectrum: the Creamy Spy Chronicles is a compilation album by Digable Planets. The album contains remastered songs in addition to previously unavailable songs and remixes. The album contains their 1993 top ten hit "Rebirth of Slick (Cool Like Dat)". Indicating the group's appreciation of jazz history, the album was released by the jazz label Blue Note Records.

== Track listing ==
1. Intro 0:33
2. Dedicated 2:45
3. Nickel Bags 3:23
4. Jettin' 4:48
5. Where I'm From (remix) 4:46
6. Three Slim's Dynamite 5:04
7. Dog It 4:22
8. Rebirth of Slick (Cool Like Dat) 4:21
9. Dial 7 (Axioms of Creamy Spies) 5:21
10. Graffiti 5:25
11. Pacifics 4:36
12. 9th Wonder (Blackitolism) 3:56
13. Where I'm From 4:39
