= Blowout Comb =

Studio album by Digable Planets
- Released: October 18, 1994
- Recorded: 1993–1994
- Studio: Bass Hits Recording Studio, New York City
- Genre: East Coast hip hop; jazz rap; alternative hip hop
- Length: 61:42
- Label: Pendulum; EMI
- Producer: Digable Planets; Dave Darlington

Digable Planets chronology
Reachin' (A New Refutation of Time and Space) (1993)	Blowout Comb (1994)

Singles from Blowout Comb
- 1. "9th Wonder (Blackitolism)" Released: September 13, 1994; 2. "Dial 7 (Axioms of Creamy Spies)" Released: February 14, 1995

Blowout Comb is the second and final studio album by American hip hop group Digable Planets, released October 18, 1994, on Pendulum/EMI Records. The album was written and recorded in Brooklyn, New York, where the group moved, with recording sessions beginning in 1993 and finishing in 1994. On Blowout Comb, Digable Planets abandoned the radio friendly style of their debut album and worked with a more ambitious, stripped-down sound. The album features a diverse range of samples and live instruments, and contains lyrical themes of the inner city and black nationalism. It also features guest appearances from Guru of Gang Starr, Jeru the Damaja, and DJ Jazzy Joyce.

Upon its release, Blowout Comb received minimal label support, and virtually no pre-release publicity. It peaked at number 32 on the Billboard 200, and number 13 on the Top R&B Albums, making it a commercial failure. It featured the singles "9th Wonder (Blackitolism)" and "Dial 7 (Axioms of Creamy Spies)", which also did not chart well, and failed to match the success of the group's previous singles. Several music writers have attributed this lack of chart and sales success to the album's afrocentric content, and un-polished tone. Shortly after the release of Blowout Comb, Digable Planets broke up due to creative differences and displeasure with the music industry.

Although the album did not achieve commercial success, and received very little attention at the time of its release, Blowout Comb received generally greater acclaim amongst music critics and writers than the group's debut Reachin' (A New Refutation of Time and Space). It has been noted for its seamless production and has been described as a "textured soundscape of a mythical world of rhymes, jazz and urban ambiance." Blowout Comb is often regarded as Digable Planets' best album, and has gained an underground following in later years. In 2023, it was reissued on vinyl LP by Light in the Attic Records.

== Background ==
On Digable Planets' 1993 debut album Reachin' (A New Refutation of Time and Space), the group used many references to insects. These concepts were inspired due to "insects nature to stick together and work for mutually beneficial causes", which the group saw as a useful principle for African-Americans in low-income communities. However, they abandoned these concepts on Blowout Comb, with group-leader Ishmael Butler articulating "All the insect concepts and imagery was outta there by the time we did Blowout. I felt that it had got misconstrued, kinda like De La Soul and the daisies. Blowout was a natural expansion of what Digable Planets were reaching for in the first place, but shallow ears got lost". Ishmael Butler then changed his group-name from Butterfly to "Ish", Mary Ann Vieira changed her group-name from Ladybug to "Mecca", and Craig Irving changed his group-name from Doodlebug to "C-Know". Black Moon's Enta Da Stage (1993) and Wu-Tang Clan's Enter the Wu-Tang (36 Chambers) (1993) have both been credited for changing Digable Planets' post Reachin' ... direction.

In late 1993, Digable Planets moved from Philadelphia, to Fort Greene, Brooklyn, where they all lived in the same neighborhood. Ishmael explained "New York City, New York was literally a Mecca for rappers so we went there and did it. Just the visceral energy; you walk outside and even if there's 20 inches of snow, somehow the city is rockin' and rollin'. I just approached it bright-eyed, like 'when I'm of age I'm going to New York. Rakim, he sounded like New York so I'm going there'. At an early age I had a sense that if you were gonna rap you had to go to New York if you were really gonna do it".

While in Brooklyn, the group was heavily involved in the community, which they aimed to capture on Blowout Comb, making it a "Brooklyn album" and a "Brooklyn soundtrack". "Borough Check", featuring Guru from Gang Starr, was one of the first songs recorded for the album and is an ode to Brooklyn. It was stated that while in Brooklyn, the Digable Planets "observed, absorbed, and rocked the many styles of speak, gear, smoke, and sound that New York had to offer and incorporated the various shades into a stance that was strangely celebratory, wary, indulgent, and subversive".

== Composition ==
=== Music ===
Blowout Comb had a higher record budget, with more musical ambitions, which sought to utilize different samples and sounds that were un-common at the time, as the group viewed most other hip-hop artists' music as "recycled". The album has been illustrated as "a block party, but transformed by Digable's 'ghettopoesis' into a cool abstraction of street life", and "a motley clash of sounds that celebrate boom box batteries-in-the-freezer ghetto ingenuity as a raw, empowered expression".

While on a world tour in support of their album Reachin' ..., the group collected vinyl records from various countries, and formed a deep rapport with various musicians they were performing with. Both of these factors influenced the overall sound of Blowout Comb, with its eclectic samples and live instruments. Ishmael Butler credits engineer, producer and instrumentalist Dave Darlington for helping him create the album. He recounted "Every song on Blowout is a mix of live instruments and samples. I would program the drums and tell someone 'yo, this is what I hear right here', then we'd record and get to slicing". Several music writers have described it as "being hard to tell the difference between the samples and the live instruments because they blend so well".

Several music writers have also noted Blowout Comb's vocals as being "low in the mix". Ishmael Butler stated "I read where George Clinton said the stuff that's inaudible the first couple of listens adds longevity to a record, because it draws the person in. You might catch a word or a phrase on down the road, and that makes that record all the more intriguing". Ishmael also mentioned "The vocals were to be woven in with the fabric of the music, not necessarily something that was on top. The record label was like 'nobody can hear what you're saying', but I felt like if the music was engaging enough, then over time it would provide a richer listening experience".

=== Lyrical content ===
At times, Blowout Comb functions as a reminder that hip-hop's park jam era tended to eschew downtown gloss in favor of dirty, improvisational, risky fun, and that the social ills that plagued the first generation of b-boys continue to fester unabated. For all intents and purposes, Digable Planets exist in the same historical moment as KRS-One, Kool Herc, George Jackson and Malcolm X. The references to these figures, and numerous others, can be rightfully interpreted as markers of a sincere engagement with contemporary social realities.

— R.H.S.

Many of the lyrics on Blowout Comb include references to the Five-Percent Nation, as well as the Black Panther Party, which weren't present on the group's previous album. Prior to recording, Ishmael took a trip to Los Angeles, where he stayed in Watts with several elders who were highly educated in black history. While on this trip, he absorbed many of their teachings, and reflected on his parents', who were both Black Panther members. He incorporated many of these concepts into the album's lyrics, as he didn't want Digable Planets' Afrocentrism to get overlooked by the cross-over appeal of their 1992 hit single "Rebirth of Slick (Cool Like Dat)". Group-member Mecca clarified "it was time to be more direct on how we felt about things, and the need to assess them".

Blowout Comb also contains many references to Urban culture, with a range of allusions to block parties, corner stores, public housing, barbershops, incarcerated freedom-fighters, black nationalist texts, and African-American artists. It also includes many references to Brooklyn, New York as well as the borough's characteristics and credos. Hip hop writer R.H.S. wrote that "On Blowout Comb, the beloved Brooklyn borough, and by extension New York city as a whole, is lovingly depicted in all of its wondrous microcosmic complexity as a place of convergence and collusion".

While several music writers and journalists have viewed Blowout Comb's lyrics as being more "ambiguous" and "hard to decipher", others found them to be more "looser" and "less scripted" than their previous album. In an interview with Los Angeles Times, Ishmael Butler explained "We made a concerted effort to be more literal and less abstract. The first album is lyrically much more abstract. The language is so personal it's almost cryptic. Nobody who isn't real hip can really understand it".

=== Artwork ===
The blowout comb was a popular black grooming product in the 1970s, when Afros gained strong popularity. Digable Planets named the album after them because "it means the utilization of the natural" and "a natural style".

The album's liner notes depict advertisements for fake Soul food restaurants and local events. The artwork was modeled after the distinct design of the official Black Panther Newspaper, which Ishmael Butler came across one day while at a relative's house. Many pictures of Ishmael's trip to Los Angeles, prior to recording the album, are also shown in the artwork.

== Critical reception ==
Professional ratings
Review scores
Source	Rating
AllMusic	4.5/5 stars
The Encyclopedia of Popular Music	4/5 stars
Entertainment Weekly	B+
Los Angeles Times	3.5/4 stars
The Philadelphia Inquirer	3/4 stars
Pitchfork	9.2/10
Rolling Stone	3/5 stars
The Rolling Stone Album Guide	4/5 stars
Spin Alternative Record Guide	7/10
The Village Voice	A−

The album was released to rave reviews and critical acclaim. In a contemporary review for the Chicago Tribune, music critic Greg Kot wrote that the tension between the group's dreamy delivery and the seriousness of their questions about the African-American community gives substance to the music's elated mood. Heidi Siegmund of the Los Angeles Times wrote that it maintains a subtle but consistent mood that, unlike their debut album, warrants repeated listening. Time magazine's Christopher John Farley found Digable Planets' rebellious lyrics "constructive" and felt that the live musicians employed by the group lets the songs develop into extended jams. Farley asserted that the album "should further establish jazz-rap as pop's most dynamic new genre." Robert Christgau, writing in The Village Voice, said that, although the raps are not as "down-to-earth" and the music is less jazzy than their debut, Digable Planets sound surprisingly exceptional with a live band and less samples, and rap candidly and uniquely, particularly Ladybug, whom he cited as the "genius" of the group.

In a mixed review, Eric Berman of Rolling Stone magazine found the music sluggish and formless, despite the group's admirable experimentation and "creamy" raps. Martin Johnson, writing in the Chicago Reader, credited the group for successfully reinventing themselves with streetwise, black nationalistic lyrics, but felt that the music fizzles out as they get distracted with their own rhetoric.

Blowout Comb was voted the 34th best album of the year in The Village Voice's annual Pazz & Jop critics' poll. Spin magazine named it the fifth best album of 1994, and editor Craig Marks wrote that Digable Planets improved drastically with boldly political lyrics and music that was as expressive as Curtis Mayfield and Stevie Wonder. In a retrospective review, AllMusic's John Bush cited its production as some of the greatest beats ever on a hip hop album and asserted that, unlike Reachin', the "underrated" Blowout Comb has proven to be an enduring classic. Mark Richardson of Pitchfork called it one of the more accessible albums in popular music history to relax to, although it offers a rich, underlying influence of history and knowledge for those who choose to listen to it as "a richly rendered world with so much to explore".

== Commercial performance ==
The album did not match the commercial success of the group's previous album, and was a commercial failure. Whereas Reachin' charted for 32 weeks on the Top R&B Albums and peaked at number five, Blowout Comb spent 13 weeks and reached number 13 on the chart. According to Kyle Ryan of The A.V. Club, critics originally attributed this failure to the lyrics' black power messages. Colin Larkin, writing in The Encyclopedia of Popular Music (2000), said that part of the reason was because the album lacked a song as catchy as the group's debut single "Rebirth of Slick (Cool Like Dat)". Music journalist Peter Shapiro viewed it as a failed attempt at abandoning pop for "street" appeal by another group whose original success derived from a more amiable style of hip hop.

== Subsequent work ==
Shortly after the release of Blowout Comb, Digable Planets disbanded in early 1995 due to the death of Mecca's parents, creative differences, and displeasure with the music industry. Ishmael Butler remarked "we got into the music business at a time when it still had to be original; it was more about the music. Then it started to be more economic, more material, and that disillusioned us. Being young and everything like that, we just sort of copped out. Because we weren't really the industry types; it wasn't really like that for us, so we didn't feel like we were losing out on things." Ishmael also stated in an interview with Vibe that the group didn't like the music industry because "they have nothing to do with art".

After splitting up, the group members went on to record solo work and side projects with other artists. Years later, Craig Irving reformed Digable Planets for a reunion tour in 2004, and since then, they have toured extensively. In 2005, they released a greatest hits compilation titled Beyond the Spectrum: the Creamy Spy Chronicles, which contains two newly recorded songs.

The group embarked on a tour in support of the album's 30th anniversary in 2025. De La Soul, The Soul Rebels, Kid Cut Up, E-Block, and RC & The Gritz joined the tour as openers.

== Track listing ==
- All songs written and produced by Digable Planets, co-produced by Dave Darlington.

No.	Title	Length
1.	"The May 4th Movement Starring Doodlebug"	4:56
2.	"Black Ego"	7:02
3.	"Dog It"	4:21
4.	"Jettin'"	4:39
5.	"Borough Check" (feat. Guru)	6:56
6.	"Highing Fly"	1:23
7.	"Dial 7 (Axioms of Creamy Spies) / NY 21 Theme" (feat. Sarah Anne Webb)	5:47
8.	"The Art of Easing"	5:06
9.	"K.B.'s Alley (Mood Dudes Groove)"	2:06
10.	"Graffiti" (feat. Jeru the Damaja)	4:03
11.	"Blowing Down"	3:51
12.	"9th Wonder (Blackitolism)" (feat. DJ Jazzy Joyce)	4:27
13.	"For Corners" (feat. Monica Payne and Sulaiman)	7:03

Sample credits

- "The May 4th Movement Starring Doodlebug" contains a sample from "Soft Shell" by Motherlode, and "Prelude to a Kiss" by Wes Montgomery.
- "Black Ego" contains a sample from "Luanna's Theme" by Grant Green, and "Here Comes The Meter Man" by The Meters.
- "Dog It" contains a sample from "God Make Me Funky" by The Headhunters.
- "Jettin'" contains a sample from "Blue Lick" by Bob James, and "Get Out My Life, Woman" by Bill Cosby.
- "Borough Check" contains a sample from "We Live in Brooklyn, Baby" by Roy Ayers.
- "Dial 7 (Axioms of Creamy Spies)" contains a sample from "Bad Times" by Tavares, and "Get On Up and Dance" by Eddie Harris.
- "The Art of Easing" contains a sample from "Black & Blues" by Bobbi Humphrey.
- "Graffiti" contains a sample from "Slow Motion" by Roy Ayers.
- "9th Wonder (Blackitolism)" contains a sample from "Supperrappin' Theme" by Grandmaster Flash & The Furious Five, "Blow Your Head" by The J.B.'s, and "Soul Pride" by James Brown.
- "For Corners" contains a sample from "Island Letter" by Shuggie Otis, "It's a New Day" by Skull Snaps, and "Ebony Blaze" by Roy Ayers.

== Personnel ==
Credits for Blowout Comb adapted from liner notes.

- Afu the True – vocals, vocals (background)
- Beneficent – vocals, vocals (background)
- Gerald Brazel – Trumpet
- Brooklyn – vocals, vocals (background)
- Dwayne Burno – bass
- Carl Carter – bass
- Davey Chalice – bass, vocals
- Chegua – vocals, rap
- Huey Cox – guitar (Acoustic), Guitar
- Tom Coyne – Mastering
- Crescents – vocals, vocals (background)
- Dave Darlington – producer, guitar (Acoustic), Guitar, Keyboards, Engineer, Fretless Bass, Mixing
- Brenda Dash - Executive Producer
- Dave the Prince – vocals, vocals (background)
- Decky – vocals
- Digable Planets – arranger, producer
- Dust Daughters – vocals
- Eye Cee – vocals, vocals (background)
- Daniela Federici – Photography
- Alan Goldsher – bass
- Guru – vocals
- Donald Harrison – Flute, Sax (Tenor)
- Jack Hersca – assistant engineer
- Jahsun – vocals
- Jazzy Joyce - Scratching, Vocals (background)
- Jeru the Damaja – vocals
- David Lee Jones – Sax (Alto)
- Lavish – vocals, vocals (background)
- Carla Leighton – design
- Bill Lounge – Vibraphone
- Lee Love – vocals, vocals (background)
- Malik – vocals, vocals (background)
- Henry Marquez – Art Direction
- Mood Dude – vocals, vocals (background)
- Myrtle Ave Nigs – vocals, vocals (background)
- Brother Junior Plus – Liner Notes
- P.O.W.E.R. – vocals
- Shi Reltub – Vibraphone
- Beth Russo – Cello
- Seven Karat – vocals, vocals (background)
- Dexter Simmons – assistant engineer
- Trim Ken Slim – vocals, vocals (background)
- Stilletto – vocals, vocals (background)
- Yvette Sugar – vocals, vocals (background)
- Sulaiman – Scratching, Vocals (background)
- Trim – vocals
- J. Truth – vocals, vocals (background)
- Sara Webb – vocals
- Dennis Wheeler – executive producer
- Tim "T-Bone" Williams – Trombone

== Charts ==
=== Album ===
Chart (1994)	Peak position
U.S. Billboard 200	32
U.S. Top R&B Albums (Billboard)	13

=== Singles ===
Year	Song	Chart	Peak position
1994	"9th Wonder (Blackitolism)"	U.S. Billboard Hot 100	80
1994	"9th Wonder (Blackitolism)"	U.S. Hot Dance Singles	10
1994	"9th Wonder (Blackitolism)"	U.S. Hot R&B/Hip-Hop Singles	37
1994	"9th Wonder (Blackitolism)"	U.S. Hot Rap Singles	8
1995	"Dial 7 (Axiom Of Creamy Spies)"	U.S. Hot Dance Singles	45
1995	"Dial 7 (Axiom Of Creamy Spies)"	U.S. Hot R&B/Hip-Hop Singles	88
1995	"Dial 7 (Axiom Of Creamy Spies)"	U.S. Hot Rap Singles	32
