= Digable Planets =

American hip hop group

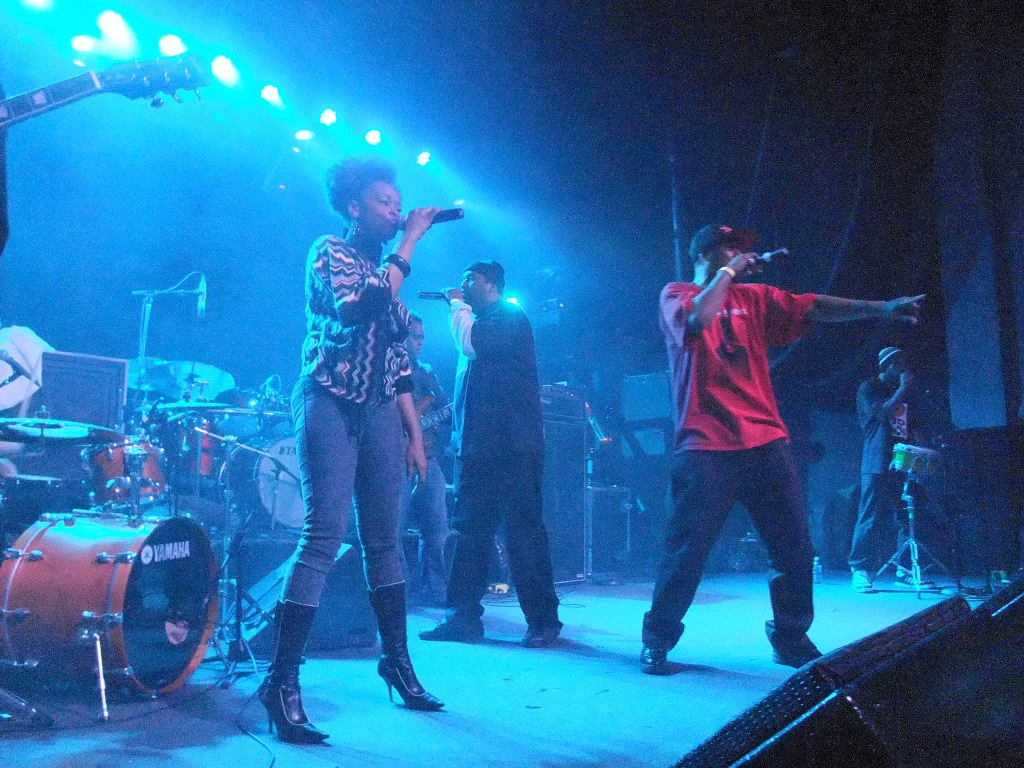
- Digable Planets performing at Aggie Theatre on December 11, 2010, in Fort Collins, Colorado

Background information
- Origin: Philadelphia, Pennsylvania, U.S.; Brooklyn, New York City, U.S.
- Genres: Hip-hop; jazz rap; alternative hip-hop; acid jazz
- Years active: 1987–1995; 2005–2011; 2015–present
- Labels: Pendulum; Blue Note; EMI
- Members: Ishmael "Butter Fly" Butler; Craig "Doodlebug" Irving; Mariana "Ladybug Mecca" Vieira

Digable Planets (/ˈdɪɡəbəl ˈplænɪts/) is an American hip-hop trio formed in 1987. The trio is composed of rappers Ishmael "Butterfly" Butler, Mariana "Ladybug Mecca" Vieira, and Craig "Doodlebug" Irving. The group is notable for their contributions to the subgenres of jazz rap and alternative hip-hop.

== History ==
=== Origins ===
Butler and Irving met in Philadelphia in the late 1980s. Originally from Seattle, Butler was interning at Sleeping Bag Records in New York and would visit his grandmother in Philadelphia, where he met local native Irving, who was rapping with a group called the Dread Poets Society. Irving had in turn met Vieira, who was originally from Silver Spring, Maryland, while attending Howard University in Washington, D.C. The initial demos recorded under the name Digable Planets featured only Butler, but after a brief stint with two other members, Butler began collaborating with Irving and Vieira in 1989.

=== 1992–1993: Reachin' (A New Refutation of Time and Space) ===
The group signed to Pendulum Records in 1992 and all three band members moved to Brooklyn, New York. Their debut album Reachin' (A New Refutation of Time and Space) was released in 1993 and certified gold by the Recording Industry Association of America (RIAA). The album's lead single, "Rebirth of Slick (Cool Like Dat)" became a crossover hit, peaking at No. 15 on Billboard magazine's singles chart, earning gold certification by the RIAA, and winning Best Rap Performance by a Duo or Group at the Grammy Awards. The track peaked at No. 67 in the UK Singles Chart in February 1995.

=== 1994–1995 Blowout Comb and breakup ===
The group's second album Blowout Comb was released in 1994. The album was noted by critics as a stark departure from the previous album, being darker, less hook-oriented and more overtly political in its references to Black Panther and communist imagery. Writing for Spin in December 1994, Craig Marks declared it "... a beguiling, demanding, damn near revolutionary follow-up." Blowout Comb features guest appearances from artists Jeru the Damaja, Sulaiman, and Guru of Gang Starr.

In the same year, the group appeared on the Red Hot Organization's compilation album, Stolen Moments: Red Hot + Cool. The album, meant to raise awareness and funds in support of the AIDS epidemic in relation to the African-American community, was heralded as "Album of the Year" by Time magazine. The band subsequently disbanded in early 1995 citing "creative differences".

=== 2005–present: Reunions and live album ===
In February 2005 the trio reunited and embarked on a reunion tour, which was followed by the release of a compilation album titled Beyond the Spectrum: The Creamy Spy Chronicles on October 15, 2005. The album combined previously released material with remixes and B-sides. From 2009 to 2011, Butler and Irving toured across the U.S., Canada, and Europe with a live band, the Cosmic Funk Orchestra.

The group performed at Numbers, in Houston, Texas, on May 15, 2010, alongside the hip-hop duo Camp Lo. During an interview with the Houston Chronicle near the time of this show, Irving stated that a new single would be released, called "Fresh Out", and that a new album was planned for digital release in summer of 2010. The group also performed alongside hip-hop group The Pharcyde at the North by Northeast music festival in Toronto, Ontario on June 19, 2011.

A reunion show scheduled for December 2012 in Seattle, Washington was cancelled days before the performance. When asked in a subsequent interview about the group's status, Butler stated "I think it's the end." Despite Butler's previous statement, it was announced in October 2015 that the trio would again reunite for a concert at Seattle's Neptune Theatre on December 30 alongside Shabazz Palaces. Digable Planets held a reunion tour during spring and summer 2016, followed by the release of their live album Digable Planets Live in June 2017. Digable Planets Live was recorded live on July 28–29, 2016, at Ardmore Music Hall in Ardmore, Pennsylvania — just 3 miles outside Philadelphia, which is where the members first met and initially formed and based their trio.

== Solo work and collaborations ==
Butler released Bright Black under the moniker Cherrywine in 2003 before going on to collaborate with multi-instrumentalist Tendai "Baba" Maraire as the group Shabazz Palaces, which has released five albums. Butler has also been employed by Sub Pop's A&R division and is helping the label build its repertoire of artists that are "imaginative" and "daring". Butler and Maraire later collaborated with Hussein Kalonji as Chimurenga Renaissance to release riZe vadZimu riZe in March 2014 on Brick Lane Records.

Irving, also known as Cee Knowledge, released two albums under the name Cee Knowledge & The Cosmic Funk Orchestra. Vieira, also known as Lady Mecca, released Trip The Light Fantastic in 2005. She has continued to collaborate regularly with other musicians, notably on Legacy/Sony's Billie Holiday Remixed and Reimagined album, Del tha Funkee Homosapien's Eleventh Hour, and with hip-hop supergroup eMC. Vieira joined hip-hop group Dino 5 as the voice of Tracy Triceratops. Vieira later joined Brazilian hip-hop fusion group BROOKZILL! with fellow Dino 5 member Prince Paul.

== Discography ==
=== Studio albums ===
List of albums, with selected chart positions and certifications
Title	Album details	Chart positions					Certifications
Title	Album details	US	US R&B /HH	CAN	NZ	SWE	Certifications
Reachin' (A New Refutation of Time and Space)	Released: February 9, 1993; Label: Pendulum/Elektra	15	5	40	22	50	RIAA: Gold
Blowout Comb	Released: October 18, 1994; Label: Pendulum/EMI	32	13	—	—	—	
"—" denotes a recording that did not chart or was not released in that territory.

=== Compilation albums ===
- Beyond the Spectrum: The Creamy Spy Chronicles (2005)

=== Live albums ===
- Digable Planets Live (2017)

=== Singles ===
List of singles, with selected chart positions
Title	Year	Peak chart positions						Certifications	Album
Title	Year	US	US Dance	US R&B	US Rap	NZ	UK	Certifications	Album
"Rebirth of Slick (Cool Like Dat)"	1992	15	20	6	1	8	67	RIAA: Gold	Reachin' (A New Refutation of Time and Space)
"Where I'm From"	1993	— (Note: "Where I'm From" did not enter the Billboard Hot 100, but peaked at number 6 on the Bubbling Under Hot 100.)	—	60	7	42	—		Reachin' (A New Refutation of Time and Space)
"Nickel Bags"	1993	—	—	93	12	—	—		Reachin' (A New Refutation of Time and Space)
"9th Wonder (Blackitolism)"	1994	80	10	37	8	—	—		Blowout Comb
"Dial 7 (Axiom of Creamy Spies)"	1995	—	45	88	32	—	—		Blowout Comb
"—" denotes a recording that did not chart or was not released in that territory.
