= Epitonic =

Music website

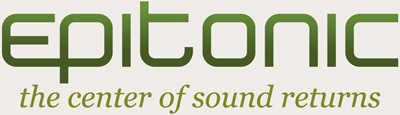
- Website type: Music downloads
- Owner: Justin Sinkovich
- Website: www.epitonic.com
- Launched: 1999
- Current status: inactive

First launched in 1999, Epitonic was a source for independent music across multiple genres from both signed and unsigned artists. Featuring free and legal MP3 downloads, radio streams, and many full album streams, at its peak it amassed content from more than 400 independent labels and represented a diverse array of artists helping them to further awareness and stimulate tour and album revenue.

== History ==
The roots of the site took place in San Francisco in 1998. Original co-founders Aaron Newton, Scott Bilby, and Justin Sinkovich created the site utilizing Newton and Bilby's Web and technology background and Sinkovich's music industry experience. The three co-founders wanted a name that properly reflected their idea. They also wanted a name related to San Francisco, the epicenter, as well as music, or sound, or tone, tonic. They settled on the combination of two words: epi-tonic, the center of sound. Epitonic.com was born.

Epitonic was one of the first free mp3 download sites, and the first one to focus on independent music. Epitonic provided an online space where users could easily find new songs from up-and-coming artists. The site also allowed users to download tracks free of charge, or create a 'black box' of their favorites and stream them through their web-browsers resulting in a streaming radio platform.

Epitonic was an iconic part of the music industry as it found its digital roots in the 1990s and hosted tracks from indie artists like Animal Collective, Built to Spill, Burd Early, Dismemberment Plan, as well as mellow, melodic instrumental bands such as Pele, Dianogah, and Six Parts Seven. Electronic music was also one of the most popular genres on the site, representing artists such as Bent Halos, Delerium, Carl Cox, and BT.

Like many of the big websites of the 1990s and early 2000s, Epitonic raised a lot of money and spent it just as quickly. When the dot-com bubble burst found itself in trouble. In 2003 the site was acquired by Chris Blackwell's Palm Pictures and ran alongside Palm's other brands including Rykodisc, Manga, RES, and sputnik7. In 2004 Palm shut the doors on Epitonic.com to focus on other brands. In 2006 Palm partnered with a company called Echospin and attempted to relaunch the site with no success. Another company, Audiotube purchased the rights to Epitonic and also failed to restart the site.

== Relaunch ==
In 2010, after six years of inactivity, original co-founder Justin Sinkovich announced that he would be relaunching Epitonic as manager and principal owner. Sinkovich also began a fundraising campaign using online fundraising site Kickstarter. Sinkovich raised over $5000 in start-up funds from nearly 100 people. In 2011 Sinkovich and his new team (as well as support from many of the original team) relaunched the newly envisioned Epitonic.com on the 12th anniversary of its original launch date of March 8.

To celebrate the 12th anniversary, Epitonic premiered one exclusive song for each year since the launch. In alphabetical order, the bands who provided exclusive tracks are: All Smiles, Autumn Owls, Bloodiest, Braids, Cast Spells, Closed Sessions: ATX featuring Esso and Scheme, Marissa Nadler, Restorations, STRFKR, Withered Hand, and The Wrens.

In mid-2018, the website ceased to function, and now redirects to a generic, auto-generated "under construction" page.

== Awards ==
- Epitonic was a runner-up in 2000 for a Wired Magazine Readers Poll for Best Music Site, losing out to the original file-sharing site Napster.
- In 2003, Epitonic won a Webby Award for Best Internet Radio, beating out KEXP, CBC Radio 3, and the public radio program This American Life.
