= The Don of Diamond Dreams =

Studio album by Shabazz Palaces
- Released: April 17, 2020
- Genres: Funk; R&B
- Length: 42:13
- Label: Sub Pop
- Producer: Ishmael Butler

Shabazz Palaces chronology
Quazarz vs. The Jealous Machines (2017)	The Don of Diamond Dreams (2020)	Robed in Rareness (2023)

The Don of Diamond Dreams is the fifth studio album by American hip-hop duo Shabazz Palaces, released on April 17, 2020, through Sub Pop. It was produced by Ishmael Butler and features collaborations with Purple Tape Nate, Stas the Boss, Darrius and Carlos Overall. The album received acclaim from critics.

== Critical reception ==
Professional ratings
Aggregate scores
Source	Rating
Metacritic	77/100
Review scores
Source	Rating
AllMusic	3.5/5 stars
Clash	8/10
The Guardian	3/5 stars
The Line of Best Fit	8/10
Mojo	4/5 stars
MusicOMH	2.5/5 stars
Paste	6.9/10
Pitchfork	7.6/10
Q	4/5 stars
Uncut	8/10

The Don of Diamond Dreams received a score of 77 out of 100 on review aggregator Metacritic based on 14 critics' reviews, indicating "generally favorable" reception. Andy Kellman of AllMusic wrote that "compared to SP's conceptual third and fourth LPs, which arrived together in 2017, The Don of Diamond Dreams is unified by its funkier and humanized sonics more than its lyrics" as "slithering from track to track with verses chock-full of elevated non sequiturs, Butler still tends to come across as a sage, somewhat alien wordsmith, but he projects more warmth than before". Nadine Smith of Pitchfork felt that "the group absorbs and warps a different sonic palette than usual: listen for the loopy guitar solos on 'Wet,' or the swaying riffs on 'Bad Bitch Walking' and 'Fast Learner.' That spectrum of influence is a new strand in their complex sound, but what surrounds it is very much classic Shabazz".

The Wire stated that "for those who appreciated the rigour of old, the new album might offer a challenge due to its lyrical sentiments and a base literalism that might be ironic", while Mojo felt that the group "twist[s] the familiar sounds into altogether more challenging forms". Uncut remarked that the album "finds Butler's effect-treated voice rippling through a prism of mutated funk and R&B that feels simultaneously sumptuous and deeply unconventional".

Clash's Nick Roseblade called it "the most consistent album Butler has released to date" as well as "a glorious album that yields more and more with each listen", and opined that "what is most remarkable is how on their fifth album Shabazz Palaces are still hungry". Reviewing the album for Paste, Zach Schonfeld judged that "with its woozy synth textures, The Don of Diamond Dreams threatens to be Shabazz Palaces' funkiest album, but it also turns out to be the group's most uneven", still summarizing that it is "immersive and solidifies Shabazz Palaces' stature as one of the few hip-hop projects to emerge in the 2010s and create a wholly distinctive genre unto itself". Evan Lilly The Line of Best Fit found there to be "plenty of mass appeal regardless of its unconventional style, but still Butler entices us just enough by adding bits of flair to its top tracks".

Tayyab Amin of The Guardian described it as "an album that incorporates elements of more contemporary, youthful rap but is perhaps ultimately not a rap record at all", also remarking that "Butler strives to lose himself within the groove, a furrow sometimes so deep it can languish there". Ben Devlin of MusicOMH wrote that "several tracks have a distinctly non-committal air to them and the lyrics often have only a fleeting relationship to the standard rap verse format", and concluded that the album "feels like aimless indulgence from a group that are capable of much better".

== Track listing ==
The Don of Diamond Dreams track listing
No.	Title	Length
1.	"Portal North: Panthera"	0:17
2.	"Ad Ventures"	4:42
3.	"Fast Learner" (featuring Purple Tape Nate)	5:36
4.	"Wet"	3:19
5.	"Chocolate Souffle"	5:01
6.	"Portal South: Micah"	0:20
7.	"Bad Bitch Walking" (featuring Stas thee Boss)	6:20
8.	"Money Yoga" (featuring Darrius)	5:29
9.	"Thanking the Girls"	4:02
10.	"Reg Walks by the Looking Glass" (featuring Carlos Overall)	7:07
Total length:		42:13
