= Earthee =

Studio album by THEESatisfaction
- Released: February 24, 2015
- Genre: Hip hop; R&B; neo soul
- Length: 42:08
- Label: Sub Pop
- Producer: THEESatisfaction; Erik Blood

THEESatisfaction chronology
| Awe Naturale (2012) | Earthee (2015) |

Earthee (stylized as EarthEE) is the second studio album by THEESatisfaction. It was released by Sub Pop on February 24, 2015. Music videos were created for "Recognition" and "Earthee".

== Critical reception ==
Professional ratings
Aggregate scores
| Source | Rating |
|---|---|
| Metacritic | 79/100 |
Review scores
| Source | Rating |
| AllMusic | 4/5 stars |
| The A.V. Club | B+ |
| Consequence of Sound | B− |
| Exclaim! | 8/10 |
| The Irish Times | 4/5 stars |
| The Line of Best Fit | 6/10 |
| MusicOMH | 3.5/5 stars |
| Pitchfork | 6.8/10 |
| PopMatters | 8/10 stars |

At Metacritic, which assigns a weighted average score out of 100 to reviews from mainstream critics, the album received an average score of 79, based on 16 reviews, indicating "generally favorable reviews".

Kyle Fowle of The A.V. Club gave the album a grade of B+, describing it as "an album that engages with the history of black culture while challenging the political, cultural, and musical status quos at every turn." Safy-Hallan Farah of Pitchfork gave the album a 6.8 out of 10, writing, "The album, at its best, feels like an alluring, slow meditation on the black imagination."

The Stranger placed it at number 10 on the "Top 10 Albums of 2015" list.

== Track listing ==
| No. | Title | Length |
|---|---|---|
| 1. | "Prophetic Perfection" | 1:41 |
| 2. | "No GMO" | 1:56 |
| 3. | "Planet for Sale" | 3:21 |
| 4. | "Blandland" | 2:35 |
| 5. | "Fetch/Catch" | 4:01 |
| 6. | "Nature's Candy" | 4:10 |
| 7. | "Earthee" | 3:48 |
| 8. | "Post Black, Anyway" | 3:29 |
| 9. | "Universal Perspective" | 3:34 |
| 10. | "Werq" | 3:38 |
| 11. | "Sir Come Navigate" | 3:04 |
| 12. | "Recognition" | 2:39 |
| 13. | "I Read You" | 4:12 |

== Charts ==
| Chart | Peak position |
|---|---|
| US Top R&B Albums (Billboard) | 25 |
