= Rebirth of Slick (Cool Like Dat) =

1992 single by Digable Planets

Single by Digable Planets

from the album Reachin' (A New Refutation of Time and Space)
- Released: November 9, 1992
- Genre: Jazz rap
- Length: 4:19
- Label: Pendulum, Elektra
- Songwriters: Ishmael Butler, Craig Irving, Mariana Vieira
- Producer: Butter Fly

Digable Planets singles chronology
"Rebirth of Slick (Cool Like Dat)" (1992)	"Where I'm From" (1993)

Music video
- "Rebirth of Slick (Cool Like Dat)" on YouTube

"Rebirth of Slick (Cool Like Dat)" is a song by American hip hop trio Digable Planets, released in November 1992 as the first single from their debut album, Reachin' (A New Refutation of Time and Space) (1993). The black-and-white music video was directed by Morgan Lawley. The song contains a sample from "Stretching" by Art Blakey & the Jazz Messengers.

"Rebirth of Slick" peaked at No. 15 on the US Billboard Hot 100 during the week of March 6, 1993, becoming the group's only top-40 single. During that time, the song also topped the Hot Rap Singles chart. The single was certified gold by the Recording Industry Association of America (RIAA) on March 16, 1993, for sales of 500,000 copies. The song won the Grammy Award for Best Rap Performance by a Duo or Group at the 36th Grammy Awards. In 2021, Cleveland.com ranked the song as number 142 of the best 200 rap songs, calling it "the pinnacle of jazz rap."

== Track listing ==
US 12-inch single

A1. "Rebirth of Slick (Cool Like Dat)" (Crashing Giant Step mix) – 4:34
A2. "Rebirth of Slick (Cool Like Dat)" (Crashing Instymix) – 4:34
A3. "Rebirth of Slick (Cool Like Dat)" (7-inch mix) – 4:05
B1. "Rebirth of Slick (Cool Like Dat)" (Uh-Oh Planet Earth Albumix) – 4:22
B2. "Rebirth of Slick (Cool Like Dat)" (Uh-Oh Planet Earth Instymix) – 4:22

== Charts ==
=== Weekly charts ===
Chart (1993)	Peak position
New Zealand (Recorded Music NZ)	8
UK Singles (Official Charts)	67
US Billboard Hot 100	15
US Dance Club Play (Billboard)	20
US Hot R&B Singles (Billboard)	6
US Hot Rap Singles (Billboard)	1
US Maxi-Singles Sales (Billboard)	1
US Top 40/Rhythm-Crossover (Billboard)	12
US Cash Box Top 100	14

=== Year-end charts ===
Chart (1993)	Position
US Billboard Hot 100	81
US Hot R&B Singles (Billboard)	56
US Hot Rap Singles (Billboard)	2
US Maxi-Singles Sales (Billboard)	17

== Certifications ==
Region	Certification	Certified units/sales
United States (RIAA)	Gold	500,000

== Release history ==
Region	Date	Format(s)	Label(s)	Ref.
United States	November 9, 1992	7-inch vinyl; 12-inch vinyl; cassette	Pendulum; Elektra	
United Kingdom	January 25, 1993	7-inch vinyl; 12-inch vinyl; CD; cassette	Pendulum; Elektra	
