= Shabazz Palaces =

American experimental hip-hop project

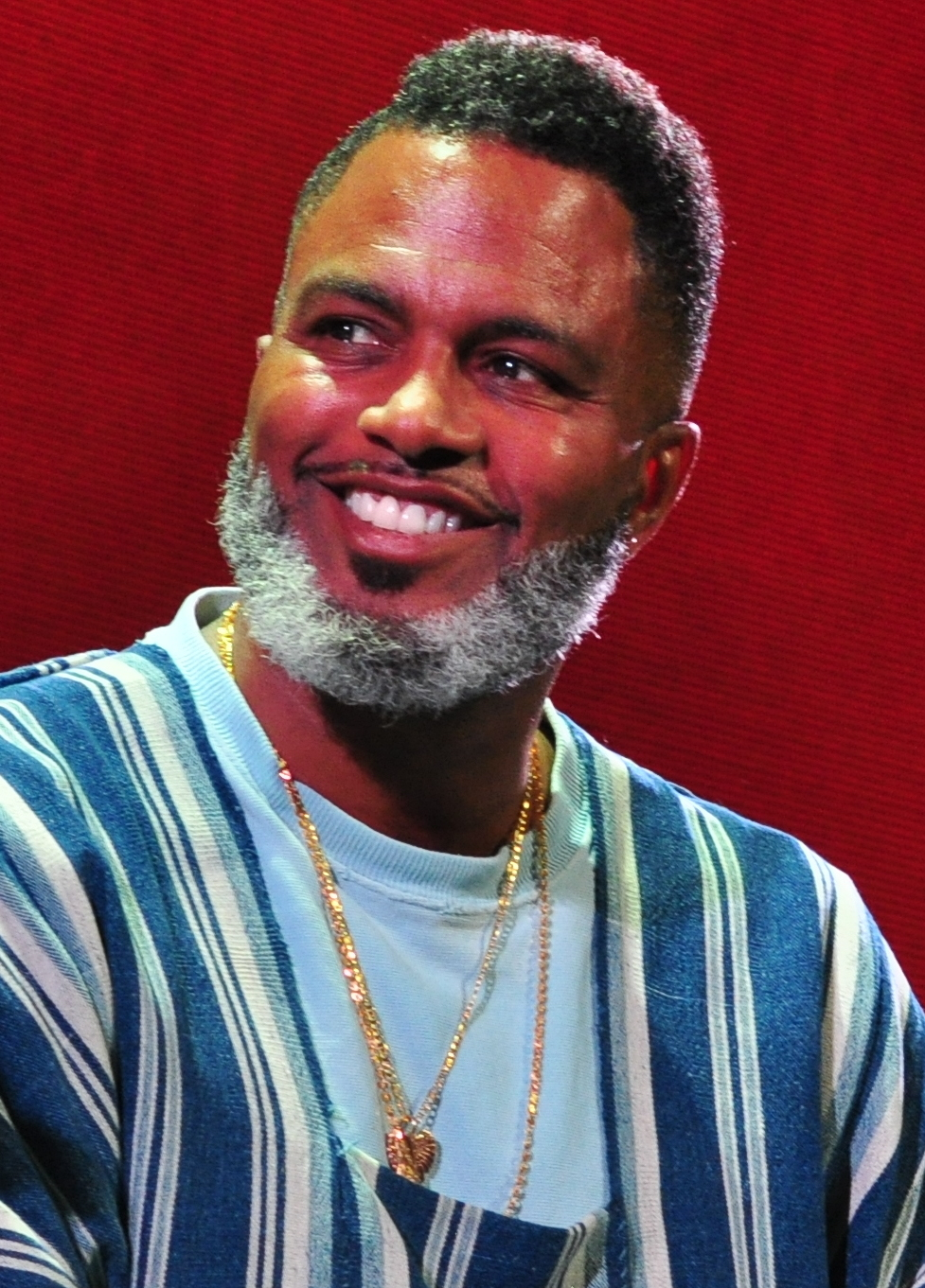
- Ishmael Butler in 2019

Background information
- Origin: Seattle, Washington, U.S.
- Genres: Experimental hip-hop; alternative hip-hop
- Years active: 2009–present
- Labels: Sub Pop; Third Man Records
- Members: Ishmael Butler
- Past members: Tendai Maraire
- Website: shabazzpalaces.com

Shabazz Palaces is an American experimental hip-hop project founded in Seattle in 2009 by rapper and producer Ishmael Butler. Performing under the name Palaceer Lazaro, Butler is the project's principal songwriter and producer and has worked frequently with recording collaborator Erik Blood. Previously known as Butterfly of Digable Planets, Butler initially performed Shabazz Palaces material with percussionist Tendai "Baba" Maraire. The act was commonly described as a duo during its early years, before Maraire's departure by 2020.

Shabazz Palaces' music combines hip-hop with electronic production, jazz, funk and science-fiction imagery. The project released two self-issued EPs in 2009 and signed with Sub Pop in 2010, becoming the label's first hip-hop signing. Its eight studio albums, released between 2011 and 2026, include Black Up (2011), Lese Majesty (2014), the two Quazarz albums (2017), The Don of Diamond Dreams (2020) and It's a Style Sport (2026). Sub Pop has also described the 2023 and 2024 releases Robed in Rareness and Exotic Birds of Prey as mini-albums.

== History ==
=== Formation and early releases (2009–2011) ===
After Digable Planets' initial breakup and his later work as Cherrywine, Butler returned to Seattle and continued making music. He became acquainted with Maraire, a percussionist and son of Zimbabwean musician Dumisani Maraire. The two had home studios, and Maraire became involved in Shabazz Palaces' early recordings and live performances. Butler subsequently described Maraire's contributions as principally rhythmic, distinguishing them from his own writing and production of the underlying music.

In 2009, the project independently issued two EPs, Shabazz Palaces and Of Light, with Butler performing as Palaceer Lazaro. The releases initially provided little identifying information about the artist and avoided conventional promotional material. Butler's identity was subsequently made public, and Shabazz Palaces signed to Sub Pop in September 2010.

The debut studio album, Black Up, was released on June 28, 2011. Its fragmented rhythms, processed sounds and elliptical lyrics differed from the jazz-sampling approach associated with Butler's earlier work in Digable Planets. The album received favourable reviews for its unconventional approach to hip-hop composition and production.

=== Lese Majesty and Quazarz (2014–2017) ===
Shabazz Palaces released Lese Majesty in July 2014. The album contains 18 pieces arranged into seven suites and incorporates electronic textures, irregular song structures and science-fiction imagery. It was created amid a network of Seattle musicians and visual artists associated with the Black Constellation collective.

In September 2015, Shabazz Palaces joined Flying Lotus and Thundercat in a collaboration called WOKE. They released the single "The Lavishments of Light Looking", featuring George Clinton, as part of the Adult Swim Singles programme.

On July 14, 2017, Shabazz Palaces released the companion albums Quazarz: Born on a Gangster Star and Quazarz vs. the Jealous Machines. The albums follow the fictional character Quazarz, a visitor to a dystopian world, and draw on science fiction to address contemporary society, technology and power.

=== The Don of Diamond Dreams (2020) ===
Shabazz Palaces released The Don of Diamond Dreams in April 2020. Maraire had departed the project and did not participate in the album. In an interview published that month, Butler said that he had composed the Shabazz Palaces music throughout its history and worked with Erik Blood on the recordings. He credited Maraire with adding a distinctive rhythmic dimension to some tracks and acknowledged the influence of their earlier live partnership on the music.

=== Later releases and expanded live band (2023–present) ===
In April 2023, Butler's Glass Cane Records released Illusions Ago, a seven-track collaboration credited to Shabazz Palaces and Lavarr the Starr on streaming platforms. Although Lavarr had been presented as a separate artist associated with Butler's label, Sub Pop subsequently identified him as an alter ego of Butler in March 2024. The persona also appears as a featured artist on "Cinnamon Bun" from Robed in Rareness and "Take Me to Your Leader" from Exotic Birds of Prey.

The seven-track Robed in Rareness was released in October 2023, with guest appearances including Lil Tracy, Porter Ray and Geechi Suede. It was followed in March 2024 by Exotic Birds of Prey, another seven-track release featuring artists including Stas THEE Boss, Irene Barber and OCnotes. Sub Pop described the two records as companion mini-albums.

It's a Style Sport followed on October 23, 2026. For the album, Butler worked with Blood and an ensemble of musicians, including Thaddeus Turner, Evan Flory-Barnes, Gerald Turner, Kassa Overall, Carlos Overall and Marquetta Miller. Butler developed his song ideas with the musicians during sessions at Seattle's Hall of Justice studio. Reviewers identified a more personal approach to the subjects of memory and aging alongside the project's established experimental sound.

== Musical style and production ==
Shabazz Palaces has been classified as experimental and alternative hip-hop. Its music combines electronic processing, unconventional rhythms, altered samples and elements of jazz, funk and improvisation. Butler's lyrics and the project's visual presentation frequently draw on science fiction, mythology and Afrofuturist imagery.

Butler has described a recording process in which he usually begins with a beat or an initial musical idea before developing it with collaborators. In a 2015 interview with Tape Op, he identified himself as the usual originator of Shabazz Palaces material and described Blood's role in helping shape the recordings. The project's studio personnel have varied rather than forming a fixed ensemble.

The early live act featured Butler's vocals alongside backing tracks and Maraire's percussion. Later touring lineups expanded to include instrumentalists such as Thaddeus Turner, Evan Flory-Barnes and Darrius Willrich. Butler described the expanded arrangements in 2026 as requiring greater coordination and rehearsal than the earlier live setup.

== Collaborations and visual work ==
Blood has been a frequent recording collaborator, while musicians including THEESatisfaction, Thaddeus Turner and Darrius Willrich have contributed to recordings or performances. Shabazz Palaces has also worked with artists affiliated with Seattle's Black Constellation collective, including visual artists Nep Sidhu and Maikoiyo Alley-Barnes. Their work has encompassed album artwork, installations, stage design and music videos.

== Discography ==
=== Studio albums ===
- Black Up (2011)
- Lese Majesty (2014)
- Quazarz: Born on a Gangster Star (2017)
- Quazarz vs. the Jealous Machines (2017)
- The Don of Diamond Dreams (2020)
- Robed in Rareness (2023)
- Exotic Birds of Prey (2024)
- It's a Style Sport (2026)

Sub Pop also refers to Robed in Rareness and Exotic Birds of Prey as mini-albums, while counting It's a Style Sport as Shabazz Palaces' eighth studio album.

=== Extended plays ===
- Shabazz Palaces (2009)
- Of Light (2009)
- Illusions Ago (2023; with Lavarr the Starr)

=== Live albums ===
- Live at Sasquatch 2010 (2011; self-released digital album)
- Live at KEXP (2012)
- Live at Third Man Records (2016)
