= Erik Blood =

American musician and record producer

Erik Blood is a musician, studio engineer, composer, and record producer from Seattle, Washington. He has released two solo albums: Touch Screens (2014) and Lost in Slow Motion (2016). He is also known for his work with, among other artists, the Seattle-based hip hop groups Shabazz Palaces and THEESatisfaction. He has often cited his friend Arlo's expansive collection of music for inspiring him. He has worked with Shabazz Palaces since they were formed in 2009. He also produced the Seattle punk rock band Tacocat's third album Lost Time. In 2014, he was nominated for a Stranger Genius Award in music.

== Selected discography ==
For a complete discography, see Blood's official website.

=== As solo artist ===
- Touch Screens (self-released, 2014)
- Transom (No Genre Tapes EP, 2016)
- Lost in Slow Motion (HomeSkillet Records, 2016)

=== As producer ===
- Lost Time by Tacocat (Hardly Art, 2016)
- Lovejoys by Pickwick
- This Mess is a Place by Tacocat (2019)

=== As engineer ===
- Lese Majesty by the Shabazz Palaces (Sub Pop, 2014), which Blood mixed and engineered.

=== As featured artist ===
- Featured on the title track of EarthEE by THEESatisfaction (Sub Pop, 2015)
