= THEESatisfaction =

American hip hop group

- Origin: Seattle, Washington, U.S.
- Genres: Hip hop; R&B; neo soul; psychedelic rap
- Years active: 2008–2016
- Label: Sub Pop
- Past members: Stasia "Stas" Irons; Catherine "SassyBlack" Harris-White

THEESatisfaction is a former American music duo based in Seattle, Washington. It consisted of Stasia "Stas" Irons and Catherine "Cat" Harris-White.

== History ==
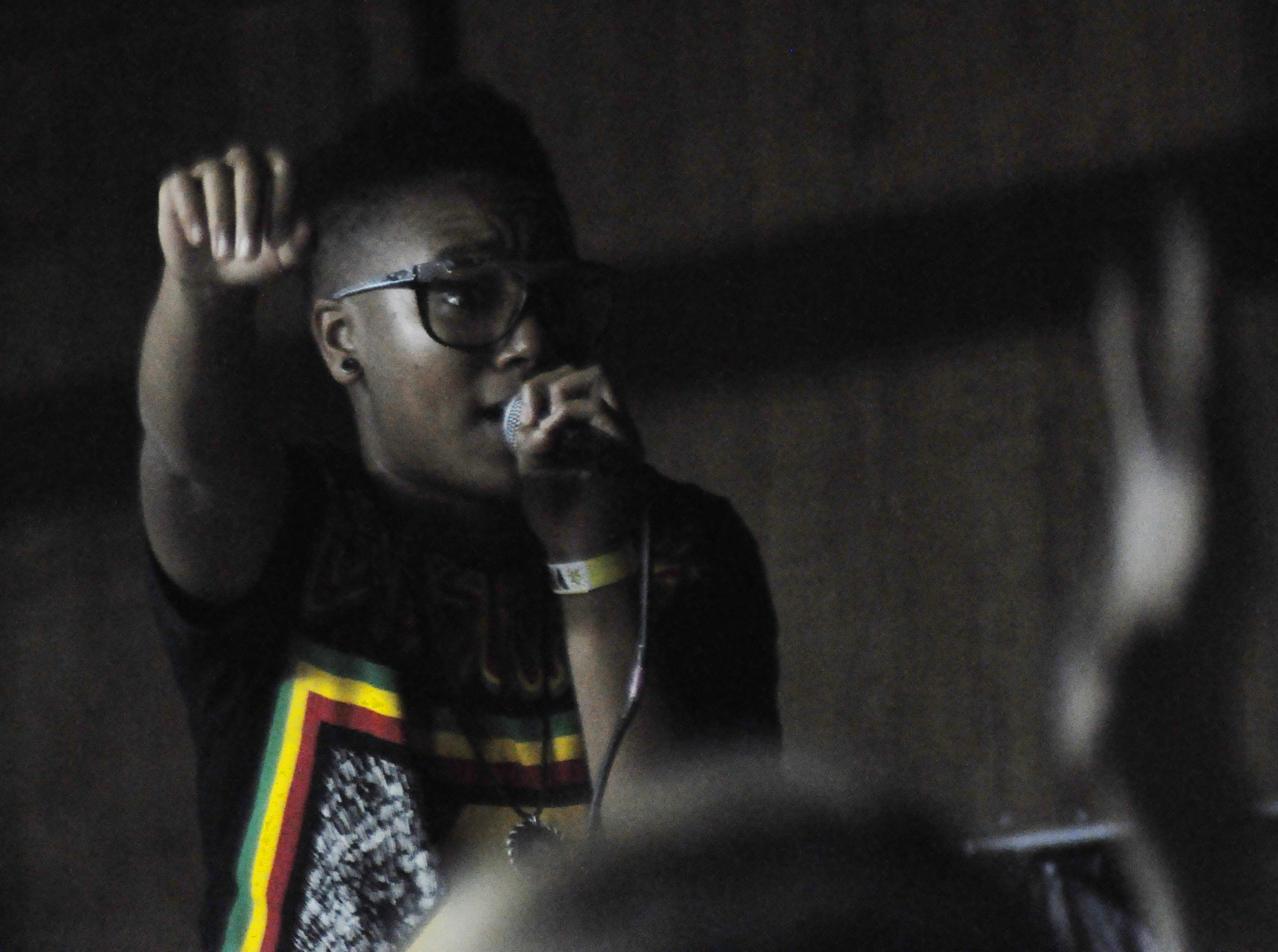
Stasia "Stas" Irons performing as part of THEESatisfaction in Seattle in 2009

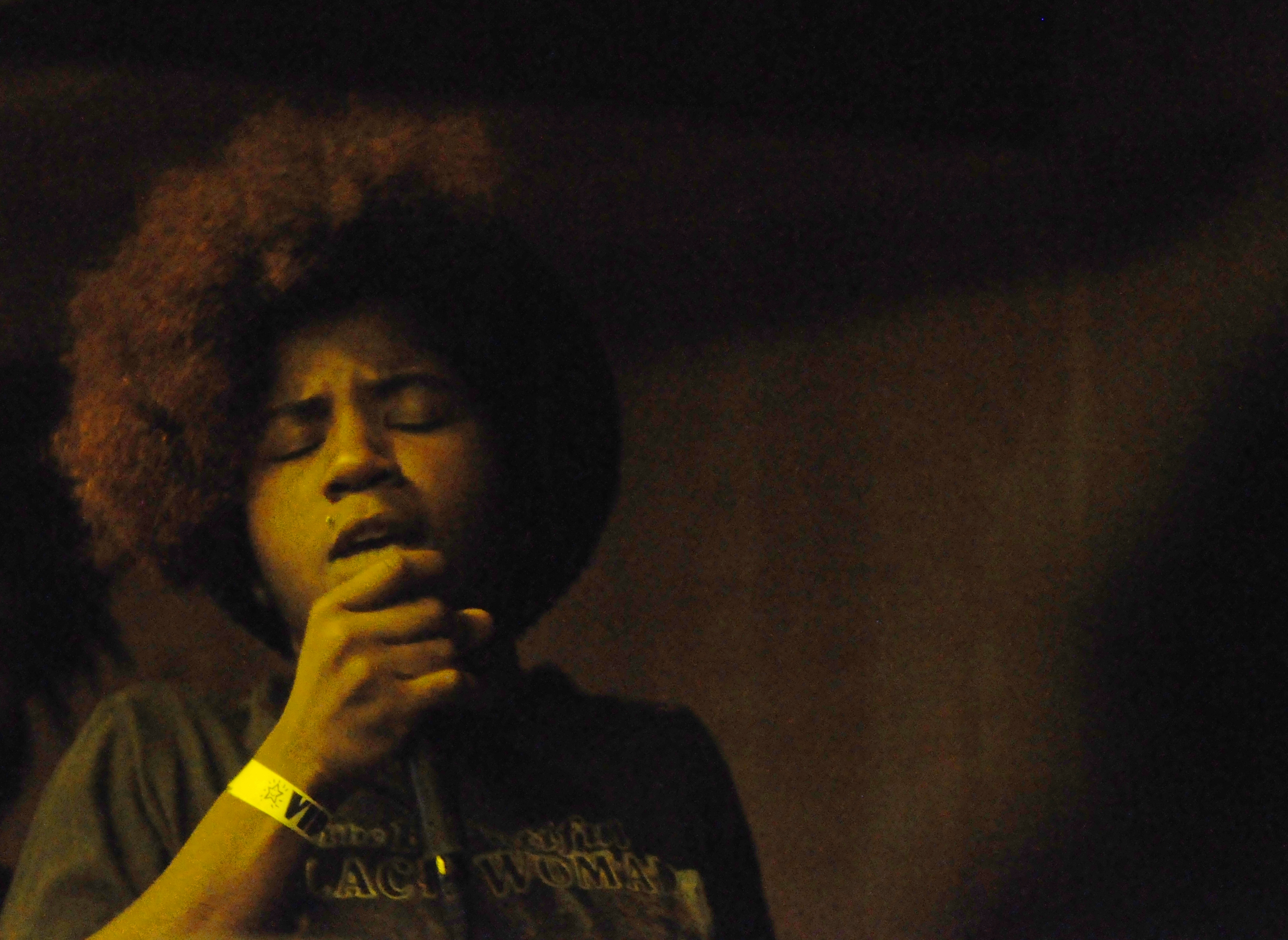
Catherine "Cat" Harris-White performing as part of THEESatisfaction in Seattle in 2009

Stasia Irons was born in 1985 in Tacoma, Washington. Catherine Harris-White was raised in Hawaii. Irons moved from Tacoma to Seattle in 1996, while Harris-White moved from Hawaii to Seattle in 1997. The two met in 2005 while Irons was attending the University of Washington and Harris-White was attending Cornish College of the Arts.

THEESatisfaction was formed in 2008. They began to self-release their recordings through Bandcamp. In 2010, the duo released a collaborative single with Champagne Champagne, titled "Magnetic Blackness". The duo was featured on Shabazz Palaces' 2011 album Black Up.

In 2011, the duo signed to the record label Sub Pop. It was the second hip hop group to be signed by Sub Pop.

The duo released a studio album, Awe Naturale, on Sub Pop on March 27, 2012.

The follow-up studio album, Earthee, was released on Sub Pop on February 24, 2015.

In 2016, THEESatisfaction announced that they had decided to "end the group" to "rest, reflect & grow independently."

== Discography ==
=== Studio albums ===
- Awe Naturale (2012)
- Earthee (2015)

=== EPs ===
- That's Weird (2008)
- Snow Motion (2009)
- Transitions (2010)
- THEESatisfaction Loves the Sa-Ra Creative Partners (2010)
- THEESatisfaction Loves Stevie Wonder: Why We Celebrate Colonialism (2010)
- Sandra Bollocks Black Baby (2011)
- THEESatisfaction Loves Anita Baker (2012)
- THEESatisfaction Loves Erykah Badu (2013)
- And That's Your Time (2013)

=== Singles ===
- "Magnetic Blackness" (2010) (with Champagne Champagne)
- "I Don't Like You" (2015)
