= Pendulum Records =

Record label

Pendulum Records is a hip hop-oriented record label originally founded in 1991 by Ruben Rodriguez, who was then working as a senior vice president for urban music at Elektra Records. In 1992, Rodriguez resigned his position at Elektra to devote more time to his position as president of Pendulum. At the time, Pendulum was an imprint label being distributed by Elektra. In 1993, it switched distribution partners from Elektra to EMI Records. One of the label's most prominent and profitable signatories was the hip hop group Digable Planets. Digable Planets member Craig "Doodlebug" Irving blames the switch from Elektra to EMI for leading to their second album, Blowout Comb, not being very well-publicized.

In October 2021, Pendulum Records founder Ruben Rodriguez died at 68 years old.

== Notable artists ==
- Boogiemonsters
- Digable Planets
- Lords of the Underground
- Meli'sa Morgan
