= Sasquatch! Music Festival =

Annual music festival in George, Washington, United States

Coordinates: 47°6′5.16″N 119°59′44.87″W

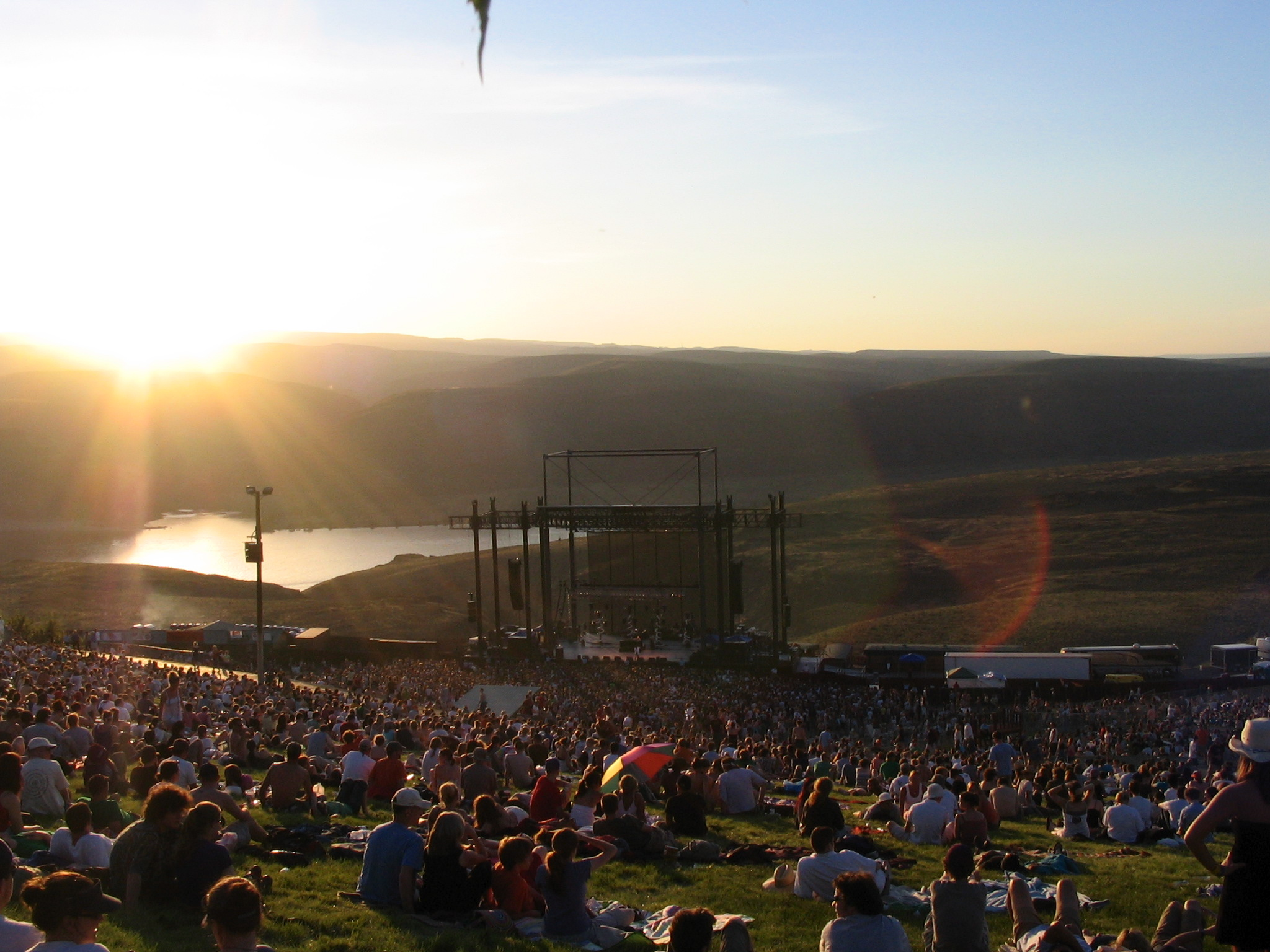
- Sasquatch! Music Festival 2005
- Genre: Indie rock, experimental rock, singer-songwriter, electronica, alternative rock, underground hip-hop
- Dates: Memorial Day weekend
- Locations: The Gorge Amphitheatre, George, Washington, U.S.
- Years active: 2002–2018
- Founders: Adam Zacks
- Website: sasquatchfestival.com

Sasquatch! Music Festival was an annual music festival held at The Gorge Amphitheatre in George, Washington, United States. It took place on Memorial Day weekend, running for three to four days.

In 2018, it was announced that the festival was canceled indefinitely and would not return in 2019.

== About the festival ==
2008 Logo

Sasquatch! typically featured a range of musical genres, with the emphasis being on indie rock bands and singer-songwriters, but also including alternative rock, hip hop, EDM, and comedy acts. As of 2012, the festival featured five stages: Sasquatch! Main Stage, Bigfoot Stage, Banana Shack (a tent that featured primarily comedy acts and electronic music- now known as El Chupacabra), Yeti Stage, and Uranus Stage (the smallest of stages, that generally changed names every year, but was not present from 2017 onward).

Most attendees of the festival camped in designated campsite fields nearby, as the venue is relatively remote and there are no large urban areas nearby.

Sasquatch! was voted as one of the "Top 10 Summer Music Festivals in the US" by ConcertBoom.

== History ==
The Sasquatch! Music Festival was founded in 2002 by Pacific Northwest-based concert promoter Adam Zacks, then at House of Blues. Prior to the inception of the festival, Zacks booked and managed shows at the Roseland Theater in Portland, Oregon. After moving to Seattle to be closer to friends and family, Zacks began considering the creation of a music festival in the Pacific Northwest. In an interview with Seattle Weekly in September 2007, Zacks described the birth of Sasquatch!:

Sasquatch was an idea born on a hunch that there was untapped demand for a certain kind of festival that catered to the eclectic tastes of music enthusiasts. It started in 2002, which was shortly after a number of the touring festivals (Lollapalooza, Lilith, Horde) had petered out and the beginning of the wave of regional festivals that started with Coachella and now is a dominant force on the music landscape, with Bonnaroo, Austin City Limits, etc.

In 2014, Adam Zacks decided to expand the festival to two weekends due to the high demand for tickets in 2013. On March 21, 2014, the Independence Day Weekend of Sasquatch was cancelled. Jeff Trisler, President of Live Nation, released the following statement upon the announcement: "The Sasquatch! community has spoken. They continue to support the traditional Memorial Day Weekend event with great enthusiasm," Jeff Trisler, president of Live Nation Seattle, said in a statement. "Unfortunately, the second weekend was not embraced. We felt it was better to cancel the new event now and give everyone time to make alternative plans for the Fourth of July weekend. Going forward, Sasquatch! Music Festival will be at the Gorge Amphitheatre on the weekend the fans want: Memorial Day Weekend only."

On June 28, 2018, Zacks officially announced that Sasquatch! Music Festival would cease operation indefinitely and would not be returning in 2019.

== 2018 ==
=== Lineup ===
==== Friday, May 25 ====
- Bon Iver
- David Byrne
- Tyler, the Creator
- Vince Staples
- Tash Sultana
- Thundercat
- Wolf Parade
- Snakehips
- Margo Price
- Hippo Campus
- Nao
- Julien Baker
- Whitney
- Pond
- Thunderpussy
- Hurray for the Riff Raff
- Lemaitre
- Gang of Youths
- Jeff Rosenstock
- Son Little
- Benjamin Clementine
- The Garden
- The Suffers
- Taco
- Giants in the Trees
- Aquilo
- CCFX

==== Saturday, May 26 ====
- Modest Mouse
- Spoon
- Grizzly Bear
- Explosions in the Sky
- TV on the Radio
- Shakey Graves
- Japandroids
- Jai Wolf
- Petit Biscuit
- Lizzo
- Pedro the Lion
- PUP
- Pickwick
- Tyler Childers
- Girlpool
- Curtis Harding
- Rostam
- Jlin
- Algiers
- Sango
- White Reaper
- Escort
- Magic Sword
- Wilderado
- Polyrhythmics
- Mimicking Birds
- Bread & Butter

==== Sunday, May 27 ====
- The National
- Ray Lamontagne
- Anderson Paak & The Free Nationals
- Neko Case
- Slowdive
- Tune-Yards
- What So Not
- Perfume Genius
- Noname
- Tokimonsta
- Tank and the Bangas
- Jacob Banks
- Big Thief
- Japanese Breakfast
- Sandy Alex G
- Typhoon
- Dhani Harrison
- Soccer Mommy
- Barclay Crenshaw
- Too Many Zooz
- Oliver
- Phoebe Bridgers
- Alex Lahey
- Charly Bliss
- Gifted Gab (replaced Chastity Belt (band))
- The Weather Station
- Choir! Choir! Choir!

== 2017 ==
=== Lineup ===
==== Friday, May 26 ====
- Frank Ocean(cancelled, replaced by LCD Soundsystem)
- The Head and the Heart
- Bonobo
- Kaytranada
- Sleigh Bells
- Charles Bradley & His Extraordinaires
- Foxygen
- The Strumbellas
- Thee Oh Sees
- Rainbow Kitten Surprise
- Sales
- The Hotelier
- Big Freedia
- Manatee Commune
- Corey Harper
- Mondo Cozmo
- Flint Eastwood
- Los Colognes
- Porter Ray
- Gazebos
- Sasheer Zamata
- Sal Vulcano
- Yogi Paliwal

==== Saturday, May 27 ====
- Twenty One Pilots
- MGMT
- Mac Miller (cancelled, replaced by Sir Mix-a-Lot)
- Bleachers
- Big Gigantic
- Vulfpeck
- Bomba Estéreo
- Aesop Rock
- American Football
- Jagwar Ma
- Kungs
- The Radio Dept.
- Benjamin Clementine
- Arkells
- IHF
- Kaiydo (cancelled, replaced by Sam Lachow)
- Klangstof
- Reuben & The Dark
- Courtney Marie Andrews
- Katie Kate
- Donormaal
- Fred Armisen
- Nate Bargatze
- Alice Wetterlund

==== Sunday, May 28 ====
- Chance the Rapper
- The Shins
- Phantogram
- Rüfüs Du Sol
- Chicano Batman
- Catfish and the Bottlemen (cancelled)
- Kiiara
- Bob Moses
- Car Seat Headrest
- Mount Kimbie
- Fakear
- Moses Sumney
- White Lung
- Cigarettes After Sex
- July Talk
- Boogie
- Joey Purp
- Hoops
- Kyle Craft
- Saint Mesa
- Beth Stelling
- Sam Morril
- Emmett Montgomery

== 2016 ==
=== Lineup ===
==== Friday, May 27 ====
- Disclosure
- Grace Love & The True Loves
- Oh Wonder
- Andra Day
- A$AP Rocky
- Telekinesis (band)
- Unknown Mortal Orchestra
- Vince Staples
- Yeasayer
- Chet Faker
- Lion Babe
- Gordi
- Bayonne
- LANY
- Wolf Alice
- Marcus Marr
- Alina Baraz
- Todd Terje

==== Saturday, May 28 ====
- Major Lazer
- Brothers from Another
- Raury
- Matt Corby
- Nathaniel Rateliff & The Night Sweats
- Lord Huron
- Digable Planets
- M83
- Hibou
- Noah Gunderson
- La Luz
- Ty Segall & The Muggers
- M. Ward
- Blind Pilot
- Vic Mensa
- Tycho
- Tangerine
- The Dip
- John Mark Nelson
- Ryan Caraveo
- Tamaryn
- Protomartyr
- Hop Along
- Shannon & The Clams
- Preoccupations
- Moshe Kasher
- Natasha Leggero
- The Lucas Bros
- Kevin Garrett
- Beat Connection
- Marian Hill
- Rudimental

==== Sunday, May 29 ====
- The Cure
- Tacocat
- Houndmouth
- Saint Motel (cancelled due to severe wind)
- Frightened Rabbit (cancelled due to severe wind)
- Allen Stone
- Leon Bridges
- Alabama Shakes
- Deep Sea Diver
- Autolux
- The Twilight Sad
- Savages
- Yo La Tengo
- Mac Demarco
- Purity Ring
- Big Grams + Big Boi & Phantogram
- Cosmos
- Ruler
- Fauna Shade
- Wimps
- Summer Cannibals
- Conner Youngblood
- Kaleo
- Bully
- Speedy Ortiz
- Dave Hill
- Lauren Lapkus
- Scharpling & Wurster
- Briana Marela
- Baio
- Shamir
- Baauer

==== Monday, May 30 ====
- Florence & The Machine
- Thunderpussy
- Casey Veggies
- The Internet
- Børns
- X Ambassadors
- Grimes
- Sufjan Stevens
- Dave B
- Son Little
- Julia Holter
- Thao & The Get Down Stay Down
- Titus Andronicus
- Baroness
- Kurt Vile & The Violators
- Jamie xx
- Mindie Lind
- Iska Dhaff
- Childbirth
- Sir the Baptist
- Joseph
- Soak
- Oddisee
- King Gizzard & the Lizard Wizard
- Chelsea Wolfe
- Tim Heidecker
- Mark Normand
- Todd Barry
- Wet
- Ibeyi
- Four Tet
- Caribou

== 2015 ==
=== Lineup ===
==== Friday, May 22 ====
- Sleater-Kinney
- Of Monsters and Men
- Flume
- The New Pornographers
- Little Dragon
- Gogol Bordello
- Jungle
- Action Bronson
- Angel Olsen
- Kaytranada
- AlunaGeorge
- Goldlink
- Bishop Nehru
- Mother Mother
- Cardiknox
- Ought
- Blank Range
- Thunderpussy
- Ayron Jones and The Way
- Sisters
- Slow Bird
- Unlikely Friends
- Brooks Wheelan

==== Saturday, May 23 ====
- Modest Mouse
- The Decemberists
- Spoon
- Chromeo
- The War on Drugs
- Odesza
- Father John Misty
- Twenty One Pilots
- Kiesza
- Real Estate
- Glass Animals
- Dilated Peoples
- Sylvan Esso
- The Budos Band
- Benjamin Booker
- Perfume Genius
- Milo Greene
- Woods
- King Tuff
- Black Pistol Fire
- Will Butler
- Merchandise
- Ryley Walker
- Hunter Hunted
- Diarrhea Planet
- Bear on Fire
- The Young Evils
- Vox Mod
- Murder Vibes
- Acapulco Lips
- Leslie Jones
- Cameron Esposito
- Yogi Paliwal

==== Sunday, May 24 ====
- Robert Plant & The Sensational Space Shifters
- Lana Del Rey
- St. Vincent
- James Blake
- SBTRKT
- Jose Gonzalez
- Jenny Lewis
- Milky Chance
- Madeon
- Royal Blood
- Shovels & Rope
- Cashmere Cat
- Temples
- Rustie
- Shakey Graves
- St. Paul & The Broken Bones
- The Knocks
- Strand of Oaks
- Twin Peaks
- Said the Whale
- Kae Tempest
- Quilt
- Hiss Golden Messenger
- Ex Hex
- My Goodness
- The Maldives
- Kinski
- Black Whales
- Cataldo
- Alialujah Choir
- Smokey Brights
- Shaprece
- Aparna Nancherla
- Emmet Montgomery

==== Monday, May 25 ====
- Kendrick Lamar
- Ryan Adams
- Tame Impala
- Hot Chip
- Schoolboy Q
- The Glitch Mob
- Run the Jewels
- MØ
- Future Islands
- Ab-Soul
- Sohn
- Sharon Van Etten
- Courtney Barnett
- Slow Magic
- Hanni El Khatib
- Sam Lachow
- Dan Mangan + Blacksmith
- Thee Satisfaction
- Phox
- San Fermin
- Alvvays
- The Districts
- Broncho
- Lizzo
- Natalie Prass
- Grynch
- Manatee Commune
- DJAO
- Helms Alee
- S (Jenn Ghetto)
- Porter Ray
- Otieno Terry
- Doug Benson
- Nick Thune
- Sara Schaefer

== 2014 ==
=== Lineup ===
==== Friday, May 23 ====
- Outkast
- Foster the People
- Die Antwoord
- Foals
- Mogwai
- The Naked & Famous
- Phantogram
- Cage the Elephant
- Rudimental
- Phosphorescent
- De La Soul
- Chance the Rapper
- Kongos
- Yelle
- Classixx
- Liars
- Crystal Fighters
- Mary Lambert
- Damien Jurado
- The Stepkids
- Tourist
- Houndmouth
- Foy Vance
- Shakey Graves
- Hozier
- Rhett Miller
- White Sea
- The Physics
- Modern Kin
- PRINCESS
- Eugene Mirman
- Kyle Dunnigan
- Raz Simone
- Sam Lachow
- Gifted Gab
- Night Beats
- Kithkin
- Iska Dhaaf

==== Saturday, May 24 ====
- The National
- M.I.A.
- Cut Copy
- Neko Case
- Tyler, the Creator
- Violent Femmes
- Panda Bear
- Boys Noize
- Tokimonsta
- City and Colour
- First Aid Kit
- Washed Out
- Chet Faker
- Augustines
- Band of Skulls
- Sol
- Ryan Hemsworth
- The Dodos
- Half Moon Run
- Willy Mason
- Austra
- Cloud Control
- Deafheaven
- The Growlers
- Jonathan Wilson
- Rathborne
- Radiation City
- The Bright Light Social Hour
- Deap Vally
- Nick Swardson
- Bridget Everett
- Eric Andre
- Sandrider
- Chastity Belt
- The Grizzled Mighty
- Dude York
- Hobosexual
- New Lungs

==== Sunday, May 25 ====
- Queens of the Stone Age
- Kid Cudi
- Haim
- Major Lazer
- Elbow
- Portugal. The Man
- Rodriguez
- Cold War Kids
- Tune-Yards
- Bob Mould
- Gesaffelstein
- Tycho
- Black Joe Lewis
- Big Freedia
- Banks
- Brody Dalle
- Sir Sly
- John Grant
- Parquet Courts
- Waxahatchee
- PAPA
- Syd Arthur
- The Lonely Forest
- Lucius
- Little Green Cars
- Big Scary
- Pink Mountaintops
- La Luz
- Tacocat
- Demetri Martin
- Hannibal Buress
- Kate Berlant
- Polyrhythmics
- Fly Moon Royalty
- The Flavr Blue
- Shelby Earl
- Pillar Point
- Pollens

== 2013 ==
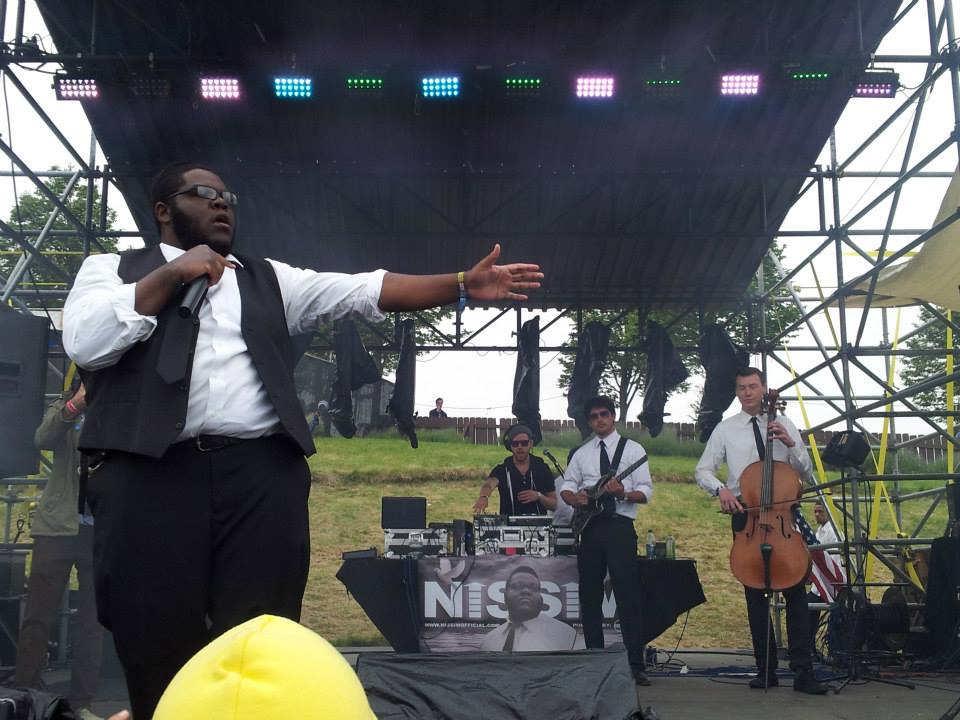
Nissim at the 2013 Sasquatch! Music Festival.

=== Lineup ===
==== Friday, May 24 ====
- Macklemore & Ryan Lewis
- Vampire Weekend
- Arctic Monkeys
- Built to Spill
- Father John Misty
- Schoolboy Q & Ab-Soul
- Youth Lagoon
- Matthew Dear
- Japandroids
- Red Fang
- Baauer
- Jherek Bischoff
- Sea Wolf
- Four Color Zack
- Reignwolf
- ZZ Ward
- Erik Blood
- Nacho Picasso
- Brothers From Another
- Shelton Harris
- Telekinesis

==== Saturday, May 25 ====
- Sigur Rós
- The xx
- Empire of the Sun
- Bloc Party
- Andrew Bird
- Tame Impala
- Black Rebel Motorcycle Club
- Devendra Banhart
- Divine Fits
- Totally Enormous Extinct Dinosaurs
- Porcelain Raft
- JJ Grey & Mofro
- Holy Ghost!
- Preservation Hall Jazz Band
- Atlas Genius
- Fang Island
- Bombino
- Surfer Blood
- Laidback Luke
- John Talabot
- Nancy & Beth
- Akron/Family
- Yppah feat. Anomie Belle
- Caveman
- Indians
- Suuns
- Rose Windows
- Bear Mountain
- Nick Offerman
- Kyle Kinane
- Joe Mande
- KnowMads
- Tilson XOXO
- RA Scion

==== Sunday, May 26 ====
- Mumford & Sons
- Elvis Costello & The Imposters
- Edward Sharpe & The Magnetic Zeros
- Primus 3D
- Grimes
- Dropkick Murphys
- The Tallest Man on Earth
- The Presets
- Earl Sweatshirt
- Killer Mike
- El-P
- Shout Out Louds
- DIIV
- Torche
- Youngblood Hawke
- Shad
- Shovels & Rope
- Radical Face
- Wild Belle
- Hundred Waters
- Wake Owl
- Sean Nelson
- Capital Cities
- Deep Sea Diver
- Azari & III
- Baths
- Lusine
- Brett Gelman
- Brody Stevens
- Jon Daly
- OC Notes: "Golden Gods"
- Kingdom Crumbs
- Xperience XP

==== Monday, May 27 ====
- The Postal Service
- The Lumineers
- Cake
- Imagine Dragons
- Rusko
- Alt-J
- Menomena
- Steve Aoki
- Azealia Banks
- Disclosure
- Toro y Moi
- Danny Brown
- Ariel Pink's Haunted Graffiti
- Beachwood Sparks
- P.O.S
- The Barr Brothers
- Dirty Projectors
- Death Grips
- Elliott Brood
- Odesza
- Ryan Bingham
- Michael Kiwanuka
- Brown Bird
- Willy Moon
- Twin Shadow
- Peace
- CHVRCHES
- Luke Sital-Singh
- The Wild Feathers
- Mike Birbiglia
- Jenny Slate
- James Adomian
- Grieves
- Theoretics
- Nissim

== 2012 ==
=== Lineup ===
==== Friday, May 25 ====
- Pretty Lights
- Girl Talk
- Santigold
- Of Monsters and Men
- Allen Stone
- Explosions in the Sky
- Mark Lanegan Band
- Poliça
- Yellow Ostrich
- Beats Antique
- Little People
- James McCartney
- honeyhoney
- Sean Wheeler and Zander Schloss
- The Physics
- Metal Chocolates
- Scribes

==== Saturday, May 26 ====
- Jack White
- The Shins
- Metric
- Childish Gambino
- Jamey Johnson
- The Civil Wars
- Blitzen Trapper
- Charles Bradley and His Extraordinaires
- Pickwick
- The Roots
- St. Vincent
- Tune-Yards
- The Helio Sequence
- Dum Dum Girls
- Kurt Vile and the Violators
- Alabama Shakes
- Electric Guest
- STRFKR
- Reptar
- Wolfgang Gartner
- Nobody Beats the Drum
- Purity Ring
- AraabMuzik
- Com Truise
- Portlandia
- Rob Delaney
- Pete Holmes
- Cœur de Pirate
- Lord Huron
- Unknown Mortal Orchestra
- Dry the River
- THEESatisfaction
- Craft Spells
- Said the Whale
- Black Whales
- Sol
- Grynch
- Fatal Lucciauno

==== Sunday, May 27 ====
- Bon Iver
- Beirut
- The Head and the Heart
- M. Ward
- Chiddy Bang
- Blind Pilot
- Trampled by Turtles
- Dale Earnhardt Jr. Jr.
- Hey Marseilles
- Feed Me (with Teeth!)
- Little Dragon
- The Walkmen
- Wild Flag
- The War on Drugs
- Here We Go Magic
- Hospitality
- Graffiti6
- The Staves
- James Murphy
- Apparat
- Star Slinger
- Tycho
- Beat Connection
- Todd Barry
- Beardyman
- Howard Kremer
- Zola Jesus
- We Are Augustines
- Active Child
- Hey Rosetta!
- Gardens and Villa
- Howlin Rain
- Reignwolf
- Greylag
- Fly Moon Royalty
- SPAC3MAN
- Dyme Def

==== Monday, May 28 ====
- Beck
- Tenacious D
- Silversun Pickups
- Feist
- The Joy Formidable
- Clap Your Hands Say Yeah
- Gary Clark Jr.
- Grouplove
- The Sheepdogs
- Spiritualized
- Deer Tick
- The Cave Singers
- Shabazz Palaces
- fun.
- Cloud Cult
- Damien Jurado
- Ben Howard
- Walk the Moon
- The Sights
- Nero
- SBTRKT
- LA Riots
- Felix Cartal
- Awesome Tapes From Africa
- Nick Kroll
- John Mulaney
- Chelsea Peretti
- Ted Leo and the Pharmacists
- John Reilly and Friends (feat. Becky Stark and Tom Brosseau)
- Shearwater
- Vintage Trouble
- Cass McCombs Band
- Sallie Ford and the Sound Outside
- Poor Moon
- Gold Leaves
- Fresh Espresso
- Don't Talk to the Cops!
- Katie Kate

== 2011 ==
The lineup for the 2011 Sasquatch! Music Festival was announced on February 6, 2011.

=== Lineup ===
==== Friday, May 27 ====
- Foo Fighters
- Death From Above 1979
- Bob Mould
- Against Me!
- Rival Schools
- DJ Anjali & The Incredible Kid
- Biffy Clyro
- The Bronx

==== Saturday, May 28 ====
- Death Cab for Cutie
- Bright Eyes
- Iron & Wine
- Bassnectar
- Robyn
- Pink Martini
- Wolf Parade
- Local Natives
- Matt & Kim
- Trailer Park Boys
- Sleigh Bells
- The Thermals
- Jenny & Johnny
- The Head & the Heart
- k-os
- The Glitch Mob
- The Radio Dept.
- The Antlers
- Sharon Van Etten
- Aloe Blacc
- Seattle Rock Orchestra
- Matt McCarthy
- DJ Anjali & The Incredible Kid
- The Secret Sisters
- J. Mascis
- Wye Oak
- Tig Notaro
- Alberta Cross
- Washed Out
- Dan Mangan
- The Globes
- Rebecca Gates and the Consortium
- Pepper Rabbit

==== Sunday, May 29 ====
- Modest Mouse
- The Flaming Lips
- Flogging Molly
- Cold War Kids
- Ratatat
- Yeasayer
- Beach House
- MSTRKRFT
- Flying Lotus
- Tokyo Police Club
- Fitz and the Tantrums
- Archers of Loaf
- City and Colour
- Reggie Watts
- Gayngs
- Tim Minchin
- The Drums
- Sam Roberts Band
- Smith Westerns
- Villagers
- DJ Anjali & The Incredible Kid
- Das Racist
- Wheedle's Groove
- S. Carey
- Gold Panda
- Mad Rad
- Basia Bulat
- Cotton Jones
- Other Lives
- Talkdemonic
- The Moondoggies
- Hari Kondabolu

==== Monday, May 30 ====
- Wilco
- The Decemberists
- Rodrigo y Gabriela
- Old 97's
- Major Lazer
- Chromeo
- Guided by Voices
- Sharon Jones & The Dap-Kings
- Deerhunter
- Wavves
- Skrillex
- !!!
- Best Coast
- Surfer Blood
- Macklemore & Ryan Lewis
- Bonobo
- Young the Giant
- Stornoway
- Black Mountain
- Givers
- DJ Anjali & The Incredible Kid
- Noah & the Whale
- Twin Shadow
- Foster the People
- White Denim
- Axis of Awesome
- Jaill
- White Arrows
- Head Like A Kite
- The Young Evils
- The Scott Aukerman & Paul F. Tompkins Show

== 2010 ==
The lineup for the 2010 Sasquatch! Music Festival was announced on February 15, 2010. Headliners for the event included My Morning Jacket, Massive Attack, and Ween. The event took place on Memorial Day weekend, May 29–31, 2010.

=== Lineup ===
==== Saturday, May 29 ====
- My Morning Jacket
- Vampire Weekend
- The National
- Broken Social Scene
- OK Go
- Brad
- Minus the Bear
- Brother Ali
- Shabazz Palaces
- Public Enemy
- The Hold Steady
- Miike Snow
- Edward Sharpe and the Magnetic Zeros
- Portugal. The Man
- Mumford & Sons
- Why?
- The Lonely Forest
- Patrick Watson
- The Middle East
- Nurses
- Fool's Gold
- Morning Teleportation
- Garfunkel and Oates
- DJ Z-Trip
- Dâm-Funk
- The Very Best
- Deadmau5
- The Posies

==== Sunday, May 30 ====
- Massive Attack
- Pavement
- LCD Soundsystem
- Tegan and Sara
- Kid Cudi
- They Might Be Giants
- The Long Winters
- Midlake
- Caribou
- Nada Surf
- Dirty Projectors
- Girls
- The xx
- City and Colour
- Cymbals Eat Guitars
- The Tallest Man on Earth
- Local Natives
- Fruit Bats
- Vetiver
- Freelance Whales
- Avi Buffalo
- Tune-Yards
- Jets Overhead
- Simian Mobile Disco
- A-Trak
- YACHT
- Booka Shade

==== Monday, May 31 ====
- Ween
- MGMT
- Band of Horses
- She & Him
- Passion Pit
- Drive-By Truckers
- The Temper Trap
- Mayer Hawthorne & The County
- Jaguar Love
- The New Pornographers
- Camera Obscura
- The Mountain Goats
- Dr. Dog
- Quasi
- The Low Anthem
- Tame Impala
- No Age
- Japandroids
- Telekinesis
- Fresh Espresso
- Phantogram
- Past Lives
- Boys Noize
- Neon Indian
- Hudson Mohawke

The comedy lineup included Rob Riggle, Bobcat Goldthwait, Luke Burbank, Mike Birbiglia, Patton Oswalt and Craig Robinson.

== 2009 ==
The lineup for the 2009 Sasquatch! Music Festival was announced on February 17, 2009. Headliners for the event included Jane's Addiction, Kings of Leon, and Ben Harper & Relentless7. The event took place on Memorial Day weekend, May 23–25, 2009.

=== Lineup ===
==== Saturday, May 23 ====
- Kings of Leon
- Yeah Yeah Yeahs
- The Decemberists
- Animal Collective
- Bon Iver
- Devotchka
- M. Ward
- Doves
- Sun Kil Moon
- The Gaslight Anthem
- King Khan and the Shrines
- Ra Ra riot
- Shearwater
- Passion Pit
- Mt. St. Helens Vietnam Band
- Vince Mira
- Blind Pilot
- Owl City
- Arthur & Yu
- Dent May & His Magnificent Ukulele
- Death Vessel
- Hockey
- Crystal Castles
- Mos Def
- Champagne Champagne

==== Sunday, May 24 ====
- Jane's Addiction
- Nine Inch Nails
- TV on the Radio
- of Montreal
- The Avett Brothers
- M83
- The Airborne Toxic Event
- Calexico
- The Walkmen
- The Wrens
- St. Vincent
- John Vanderslice
- The Submarines
- Viva Voce
- The Dodos
- The Builders and the Butchers
- A. A. Bondy
- Fences
- Point Juncture, WA
- The Murder City Devils
- Natalie Portman's Shaved Head
- Deadmau5
- Mike Watt and The Missingmen
- The Henry Clay People
- Street Sweeper Social Club
- Mad Rad

==== Monday, May 25 ====
- Ben Harper & Relentless7
- Chromeo (DJ set)
- Erykah Badu
- Silversun Pickups
- Fleet Foxes
- Gogol Bordello
- Santigold
- Grizzly Bear
- Explosions in the Sky
- Girl Talk
- Blitzen Trapper
- The Knux
- Monotonix
- Bishop Allen
- Black Moth Super Rainbow
- Beach House
- Deerhoof
- The Dutchess and the Duke
- School of Seven Bells
- Horse Feathers
- The Pica Beats
- Loch Lomond
- Tobacco
- BLK JKS
- Heartless Bastards
- Other Lives
- Amanda Blank

The comedy lineup included Zach Galifianakis, Tim and Eric Awesome Show, Great Job!, Todd Barry, H. Jon Benjamin, God's Pottery, People's Republic of Komedy, The Whitest Kids U Know, The Red Wine Boys, and Maria Bamford.

== 2008 ==
The lineup for the 2008 Sasquatch! Music Festival was announced on February 25, 2008. Headliners for the event included R.E.M., The Cure, and The Flaming Lips. The event took place on Memorial Day weekend, May 24–26, 2008. Hosted by Rainn Wilson.

=== Lineup ===
==== Saturday, May 24 ====
- David Bazan
- Beirut
- The Breeders
- Crudo (featuring Mike Patton & Dan the Automator)
- Dead Confederate
- Dengue Fever
- Destroyer
- Kathleen Edwards
- Newton Faulkner
- Fleet Foxes
- Grand Archives
- Grand Hallway
- M.I.A.
- Vince Mira with the Roy Kay Trio
- Modest Mouse
- Capibara
- Okkervil River
- Ozomatli
- The National
- The New Pornographers
- R.E.M.
- The Shaky Hands
- Throw Me the Statue
- The Whigs
- Neko Case (played on the Wookie stage at the same time Fleet Foxes were on mainstage, and was an unannounced last minute addition to the lineup)

==== Sunday, May 25 ====
- 65daysofstatic
- "Awesome"
- The Blakes
- Blue Scholars
- Cancer Rising
- Sera Cahoone
- Cold War Kids
- The Cops
- The Cure
- Death Cab for Cutie
- Michael Franti & Spearhead
- The Heavenly States
- The Kooks
- Stephen Malkmus and the Jicks
- The Maldives
- Mates of State
- The Morning Benders
- The presidents of the United States of America
- Rogue Wave
- Tegan and Sara
- J. Tillman
- Truckasaurus
- What Made Milwaukee Famous
- White Rabbits

==== Monday, May 26 ====
- Battles
- Built to Spill
- The Cave Singers
- The Choir Practice
- Matt Costa
- Delta Spirit
- Dyme Def
- The Flaming Lips U.F.O. Show
- Flight of the Conchords
- Ghostland Observatory
- The Hives
- Kay Kay and His Weathered Underground
- Kinski
- Jamie Lidell
- The Little Ones
- The Mars Volta
- The Moondoggies
- Pela
- Rodrigo y Gabriela
- Say Hi
- Siberian
- Thao with the Get Down Stay Down
- Whalebones
- Yeasayer

=== Comedy lineup ===
The 2008 festival features the first ever Sasquatch! comedy tent.

==== Saturday ====
- Matt Besser
- Sean Conroy
- Rich Fulcher
- Tim Meadows
- Jerry Minor
- Horatio Sanz
- Upright Citizens Brigade
- Matt Walsh

==== Sunday ====
- Eric Diaz
- Andy Haynes
- Kevin Hyder
- Morgan Murphy
- Andy Peters
- Brian Posehn
- Derek Sheen
- Reggie Watts

==== Monday ====
- Michael Ian Black
- Liza Keckler
- Marc Maron
- Mike Min
- Eugene Mirman
- Korby Sears
- Seattle School
- Michael Showalter

=== Christmas on Mars ===
The Flaming Lips' long-awaited film Christmas on Mars premiered on Sunday, May 25 at the festival.

== 2007 ==
The 2007 Sasquatch! Music Festival was hosted by Sarah Silverman, Michael Showalter, and Aziz Ansari.

=== Lineup ===
==== Saturday, May 26 ====
- Aqueduct
- Arcade Fire
- Björk
- Blitzen Trapper
- The Blow
- Neko Case
- Manu Chao Radio Bemba Sound System
- Citizen Cope
- Electrelane
- Ghostland Observatory
- Grizzly Bear
- The Hold Steady
- Loney, Dear
- The Long Winters
- Mirah
- Mix Master Mike
- Ozomatli
- Saturday Knights
- The Slip
- Gabriel Teodros
- Two Gallants
- Visqueen
- Viva Voce

==== Sunday, May 27 ====
- Bad Brains
- Beastie Boys
- The Black Angels
- Blackalicious
- The Blakes
- Common Market
- The Dandy Warhols
- Earl Greyhound
- Michael Franti & Spearhead
- The Helio Sequence
- Interpol
- Minus the Bear
- Mix Master Mike
- Money Mark
- The Polyphonic Spree
- St. Vincent
- Smoosh
- Spoon
- Stars of Track and Field
- Jesse Sykes and the Sweet Hereafter
- Tokyo Police Club
- Total Experience Gospel Choir
- Patrick Wolf

M.I.A. was scheduled to perform but cancelled due to visa complications.

== 2006 ==
The 2006 Sasquatch! Music Festival marked the first time the festival ran for three days. The event began on Friday, May 26 and lasted until Sunday, May 28. The second day was marked by an afternoon hailstorm, which forced Neko Case and her band off stage and threatened to shut down the show entirely. Fortunately, the storm subsided and the festival was able to continue as scheduled, as The Tragically Hip took the stage.

=== Lineup ===
==== Friday, May 26 ====
- ...And You Will Know Us by the Trail of Dead
- Bauhaus
- Deadboy and the Elephantmen
- Nine Inch Nails
- TV on the Radio
- HIM
- The Trucks
- Wolfmother

==== Saturday, May 27 ====
- Architecture in Helsinki
- Band of Horses
- Bedouin Soundclash
- Neko Case
- Common Market
- The Constantines
- Matt Costa
- Brett Dennen
- The Flaming Lips
- David Ford
- Gomez
- Ben Harper and the Innocent Criminals
- Iron & Wine
- Korby Lenker
- Stephen Malkmus and the Jicks
- Elvis Perkins
- Sam Roberts Band
- Rogue Wave
- Tim Seely
- The Shins
- Slender Means
- Sufjan Stevens
- The Tragically Hip

==== Sunday, May 28 ====
- Arctic Monkeys
- Beck
- Big City Rock
- Blue Scholars
- Clap Your Hands Say Yeah
- Death Cab for Cutie
- The Decemberists
- Headphones
- Heavenly States
- Damien Jurado
- Ben Lee
- Big Japan
- Jamie Lidell
- Matisyahu
- Mercir
- Nada Surf
- Pretty Girls Make Graves
- Queens of the Stone Age
- Chad VanGaalen
- Laura Veirs
- Rocky Votolato
- Village Green
- We Are Scientists

== 2005 ==
The 2005 Sasquatch! Music Festival took place on Saturday, May 28.

=== Lineup ===
==== Saturday, May 28 ====
- Arcade Fire
- Aqueduct
- The Be Good Tanyas
- Benevento/Russo Duo
- Bobby Bare Jr.
- Bloc Party
- Blue Scholars
- Crystal Skulls
- The Dears
- The Frames
- Jem
- Ray LaMontagne
- Math and Physics Club
- Matisyahu
- Menomena
- Modest Mouse
- A. C. Newman
- Joanna Newsom
- Parks & Recreation
- Pixies
- She Wants Revenge
- Smoosh
- United State of Electronica
- Visqueen
- Kanye West
- Wilco

== 2004 ==
The 2004 Sasquatch! Music Festival took place on Saturday, May 29. The event was hosted by David Cross.

=== Lineup ===
==== Saturday, May 29 ====
- Apollo Sunshine
- Aveo
- The Black Keys
- Built to Spill
- Cat Power
- Harvey Danger
- The Decemberists
- Donavon Frankenreiter
- Fruit Bats
- Gary Jules
- The Long Winters
- The New Pornographers
- The Postal Service
- The Roots
- The Shins
- Sleater-Kinney
- Thievery Corporation
- Visqueen

== 2003 ==
Hosted by El Vez.

=== Lineup ===
==== Saturday, May 24 ====
- Joseph Arthur
- Calexico
- Brandi Carlile
- Neko Case
- Circus Contraption
- Coldplay
- Death Cab for Cutie
- Eisley
- The Flaming Lips
- Jurassic 5
- Maktub
- Minus the Bear
- Modest Mouse
- Jason Mraz
- The Music
- My Morning Jacket
- The Pale Pacific
- Pedro the Lion
- Liz Phair
- Reclinerland
- Sam Roberts
- Ron Sexsmith
- The Thermals
- Kathleen Edwards

== 2002 ==
=== Lineup ===
==== Saturday, May 25 ====
- Blackalicious
- Galactic
- Ben Harper
- Jack Johnson
- Maktub
- Soulive
- The String Cheese Incident

== Performers that have played more than once ==
- Nine times
  - Neko Case – 2003, 2004 (with The New Pornographers), 2006, 2007, 2008 (solo and with the New Pornographers), 2010 (with the New Pornographers), 2014, 2018
- Six times
  - Ben Gibbard – 2003, 2006, 2008, 2011 (with Death Cab for Cutie), 2004, 2013 (with The Postal Service)
  - Modest Mouse – 2003, 2005, 2008, 2011, 2015, 2018
- Five Times
  - The Decemberists – 2004, 2006, 2009, 2011, 2015
- Four Times
  - Death Cab for Cutie – 2003, 2006, 2008, 2011
  - The Flaming Lips – 2003, 2006, 2008, 2011
  - The Shins – 2004, 2006, 2012, 2017
  - The National – 2008, 2010, 2014, 2018
  - Tune-Yards – 2010, 2012, 2014, 2018
  - David Bazan – 2003, 2018 (with Pedro the Lion), 2006 (with Headphones), 2008
  - Phantogram – 2010, 2014, 2016 (with Big Grams), 2017
  - Blitzen Trapper – 2007, 2009, 2012, 2017
- Three times
  - Ben Harper – 2002, 2006, 2009
  - Blind Pilot – 2009, 2012, 2016
  - Blue Scholars – 2005, 2006, 2008
  - Bon Iver – 2009, 2012, 2018
  - Built to Spill- 2004, 2008, 2013
  - Cold War Kids – 2008, 2011, 2014
  - Explosions in the Sky- 2009, 2012, 2018
  - Fleet Foxes- Twice in 2008, 2009
  - Grizzly Bear – 2007, 2009, 2018
  - The Long Winters – 2004, 2007, 2010
  - Macklemore & Ryan Lewis – 2011, 2012 (surprise show), 2013
  - Major Lazer – 2011, 2014, 2016
  - Minus the Bear – 2003, 2007, 2010
  - Sam Lachow – 2014, 2015, 2017
  - Sam Roberts – 2003, 2006, 2011
  - Shakey Graves – 2014, 2015, 2018
  - Spoon – 2007, 2015, 2018
  - St. Vincent – 2007, 2009, 2012
  - Stephen Malkmus – 2006, 2008 (with Stephen Malkmus and the Jicks), 2010 (with Pavement)
  - Thunderpussy – 2015, 2016, 2018
  - TV On The Radio – 2006, 2009, 2018
  - Visqueen – 2004, 2005, 2007
- Two Times
  - Aqueduct – 2005, 2007
  - Arcade Fire – 2005, 2007
  - Beach House – 2009, 2011
  - Blackalicious – 2002, 2007
  - Common Market – 2006, 2007
  - Deadmau5 – 2009, 2010
  - Ghostland Observatory – 2007, 2008
  - Local Natives – 2010, 2011
  - Michael Franti & Spearhead – 2007, 2008
  - Maktub – 2002, 2003
  - Matisyahu – 2005, 2006
  - My Morning Jacket – 2003, 2010
  - Nada Surf – 2006, 2010
  - Nine Inch Nails – 2006, 2009
  - Passion Pit – 2009, 2010
  - Santigold – 2009, 2012
  - Shara Worden – 2009 (with The Decemberists and Bon Iver)
  - Smoosh – 2005, 2007
  - Tegan and Sara – 2008, 2010
  - Kim Deal – 2005 (with The Pixies), 2008 (with The Breeders)
  - Wilco – 2005, 2011
  - The Head and the Heart – 2011, 2012
  - Girl Talk – 2009, 2012
  - Mumford and Sons – 2010, 2013
  - The Postal Service – 2004, 2013
  - Foster the People – 2011, 2014
  - Kid Cudi – 2010, 2014
  - Tycho – 2012, 2014
  - Of Monsters and Men – 2012, 2015
  - The War on Drugs – 2012, 2015
  - Father John Misty – 2013, 2015
  - Odesza – 2013, 2015
  - M83 – 2009, 2016
  - Sufjan Stevens – 2006, 2016
  - Unknown Mortal Orchestra – 2012, 2016
  - Rudimental – 2014, 2016
  - Chet Faker – 2014, 2016
  - MGMT – 2010, 2017
  - Japandroids – 2010, 2018
  - Jack Antonoff – 2012 (with fun.), 2017 (with Bleachers)
  - Twenty One Pilots – 2015, 2017
  - Chance The Rapper – 2014, 2017
  - Sleigh Bells – 2011, 2017
  - The Radio Dept. – 2011, 2017
  - Katie Kate – 2012, 2017
  - Big Freedia – 2014, 2017
  - Kaytranada – 2015, 2017
  - Manatee Commune – 2015, 2017
  - Wolf Parade – 2011, 2018
  - Ray LaMontagne – 2005, 2018
  - Vince Staples – 2016, 2018
  - Tyler, The Creator – 2014, 2018
