= New Year's Eve in Portland, Oregon =

Annual holiday celebration

New Year's Eve is celebrated annually in the American city of Portland, Oregon. The city has hosted a variety of events and activities that have commemorated the holiday, including balls and special dinners, concerts, drone light shows, and sobriety powwows.

== Events and activities ==
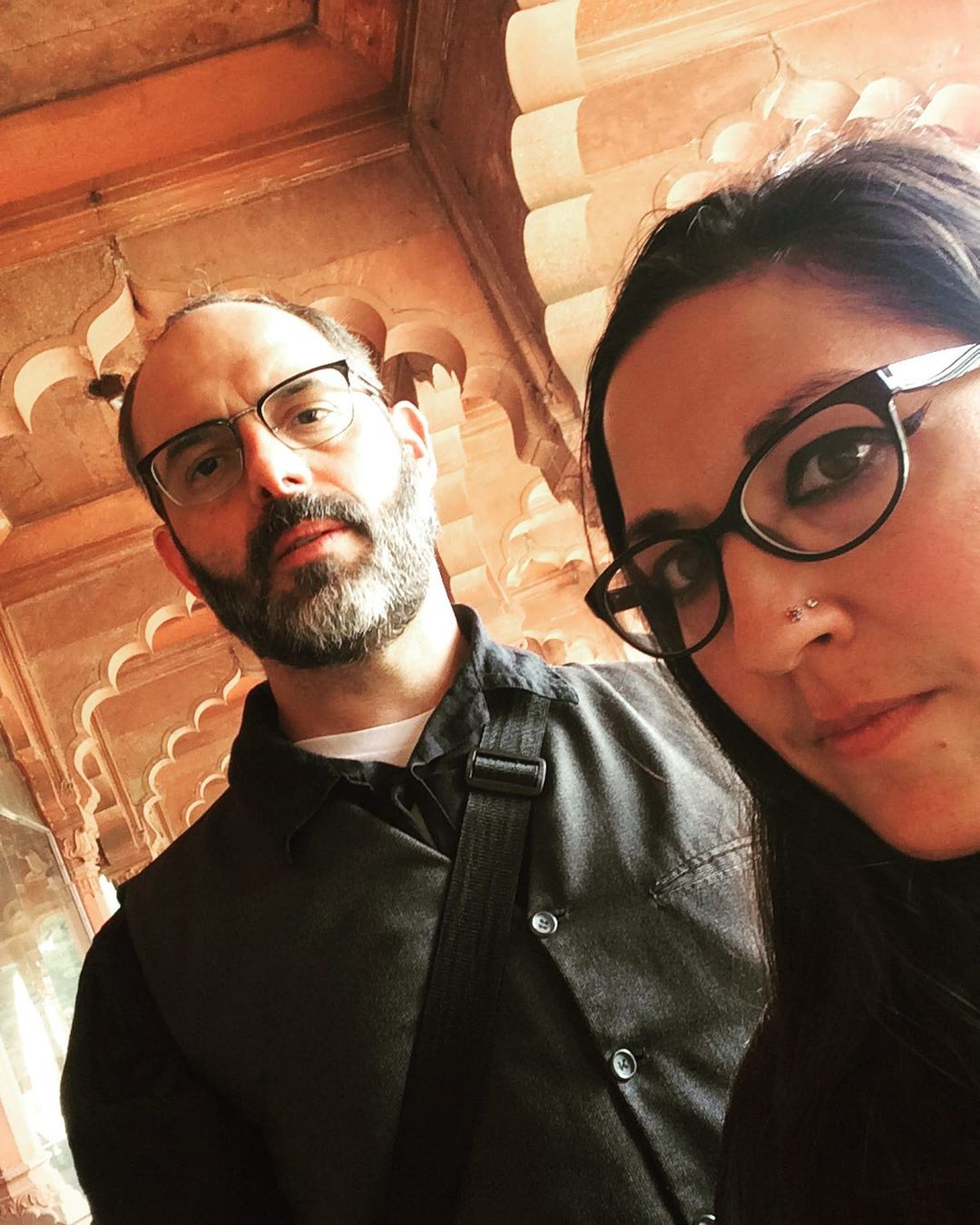
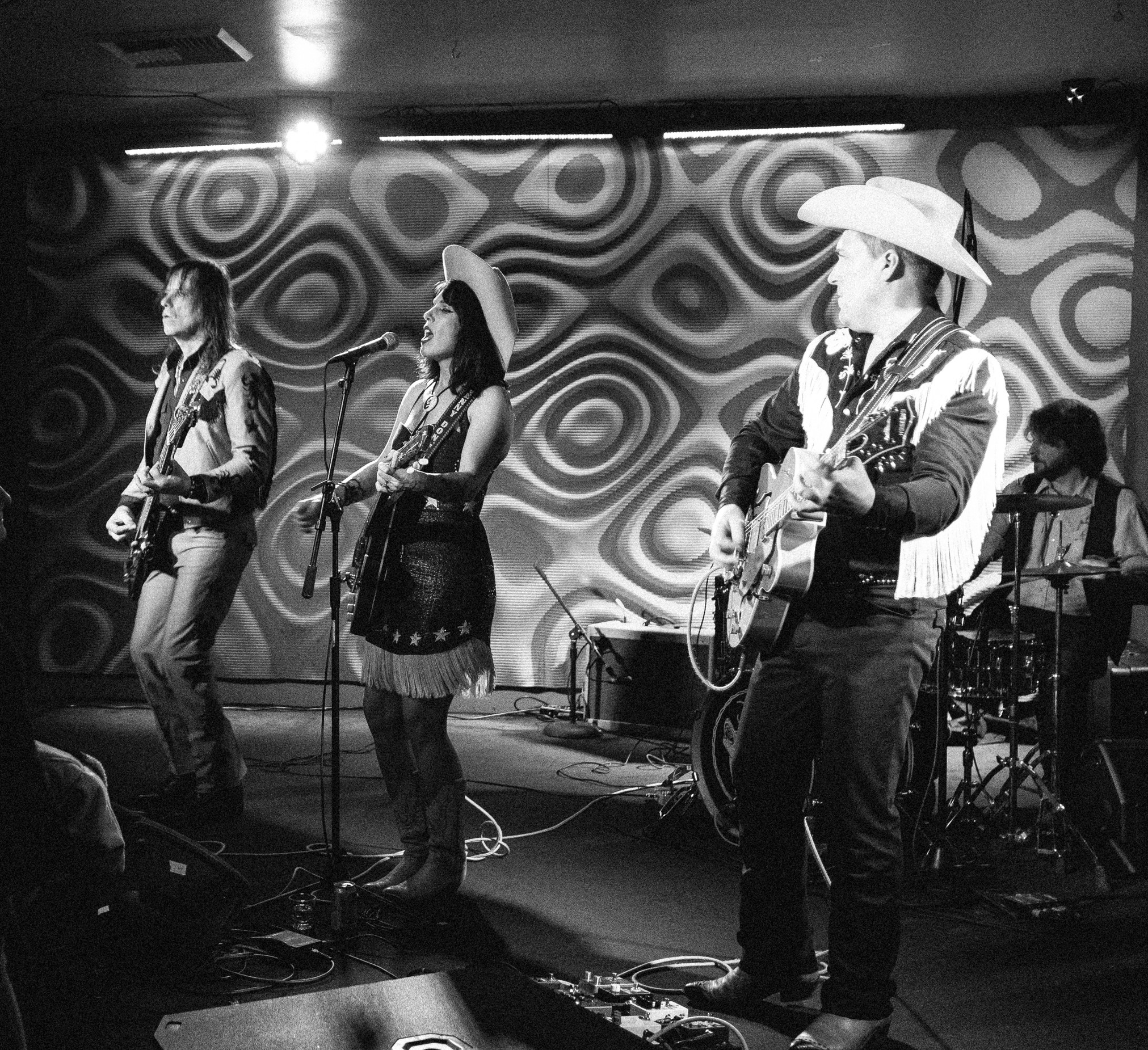
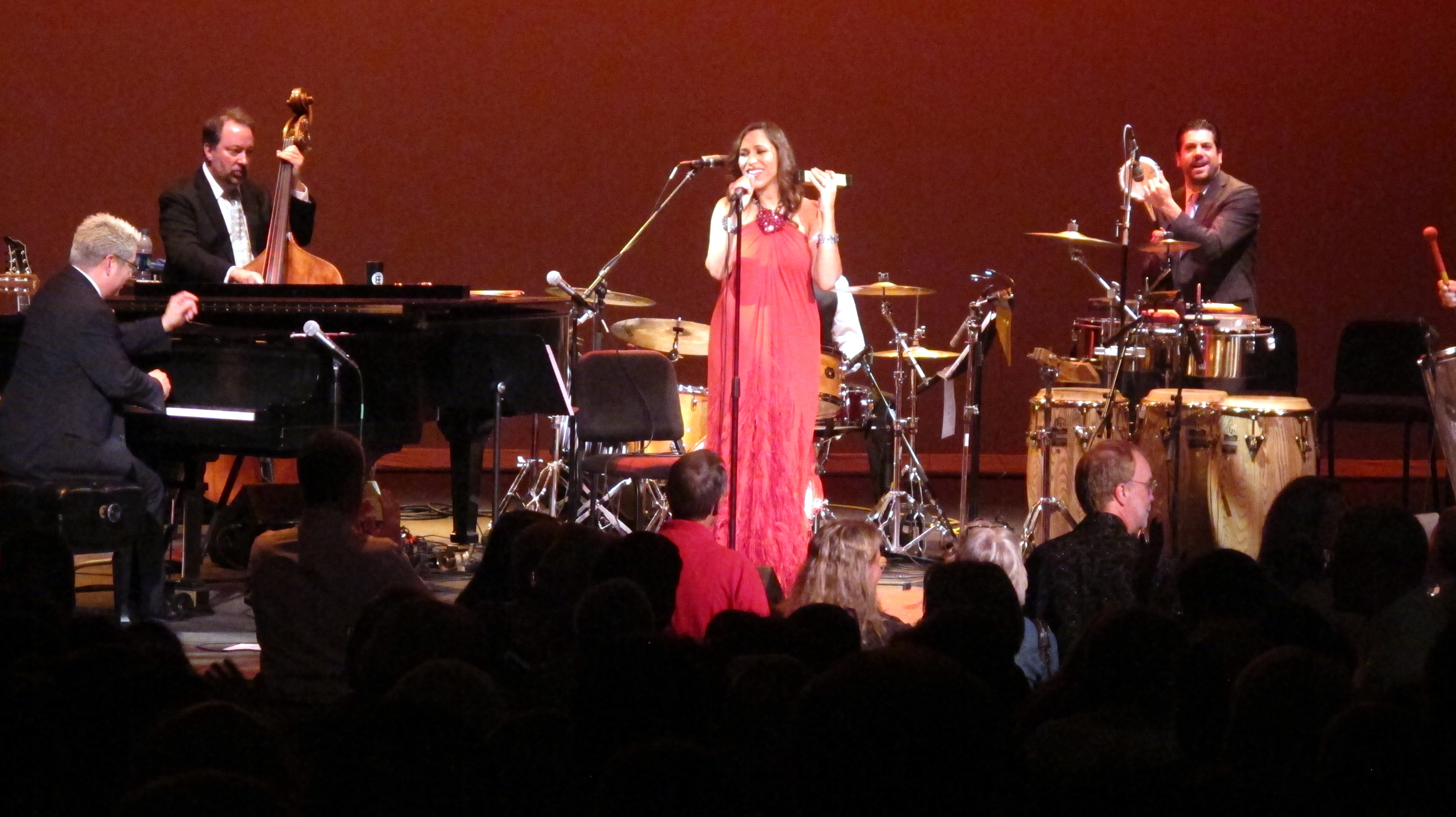
DJ Anjali and the Incredible Kid (top, pictured in 2020), Jenny Don't and the Spurs (middle, pictured in 2024) and Pink Martini (bottom, pictured in 2012) often perform in Portland for New Year's Eve.

The city has hosted a variety of events and activities to celebrate New Year's Eve (NYE), some of which are annual. The Portland Institute for Contemporary Art held its first annual "New Year's Eve Art Drop" in late 2013. The Oaks Park Roller Skating Rink at Oaks Amusement Park has hosted a New Year's Eve party attended by hundreds of people. QuarterWorld has hosted a balloon drop for the holiday for several years. In late 2023, the drag venue Darcelle XV Showplace hosted a New Year's Eve celebration with champagne and breakfast served at midnight.

Some hotels and event venues host special events. The Crystal Ballroom hosts an event annually, and The Hoxton held a celebration in late 2023. Some local bars and restaurants have scheduled dinner events and created special menus for the holiday, including Brix Tavern, Champagne Poetry Patisserie, and Portland City Grill in late 2025.

Fireworks have been illegal inside the city limits since 2022. Residents are able to report illegal fireworks via an online tool.

=== Champagne Ball ===
The Champagne Ball at the Hyatt Regency has been described by Portland Monthly as "the closest thing we have to the Times Square ball drop—except it's black tie-ish, with dance floors, karaoke, and the option to don 'singles beads.'" Willamette Week has described the event as "Portland's most popular New Year's Eve Party" and said: "This 5-star NYE celebration is in a 5-star hotel and features Portland's top entertainment, multiple bars, fantastic food, amazing party vibes, fabulous party favors, and a massive video countdown at midnight." Previously, the Champagne Ball was held at the Hilton Portland Hotel, as well as the Portland Art Museum in late 2023. In 2019, the Daily Hive said that approximately 40,000 people had participated in the event since its inception in 1990.

=== Concerts ===
DJ Anjali and the Incredible Kid perform annually for the holiday. During the early 2010s, their concert was held at the Bossanova Ballroom and featured acrobatics, fire performance, a marching band, and Punjabi music. "Cowboy Prom" with Jenny Don't and the Spurs has been described as "a New Year's Eve tradition several years running with deep roots" at the Landmark Saloon. Pink Martini traditionally performs at the Arlene Schnitzer Concert Hall on New Year's Eve. During the COVID-19 pandemic, the band streamed a concert for the holiday called "Good Riddance 2020". Brandi Carlile held a "New Year's Eve Party" at the Moda Center in late 2022.

=== Drone shows ===
The city commemorated the arrivals in 2025 and 2026 with drone shows at Pioneer Courthouse Square. The late-2024 event cost approximately $150,000 and was attended by approximately 20,000 people. The late-2025 event used approximately 250 drones. It was supported by Prosper Portland's Portland Events and Film Office and included a dance party and a countdown to midnight. Drag queen LadyBerri Matthews has been the master of ceremonies, and mayor Keith Wilson was slated to speak at the late-2025 event.

=== Sobriety powwow ===
One of the city's most popular annual events for New Year's Eve is the Native American Rehabilitation Association's sobriety powwow, which has been held for approximately 30 years. The event features dance and music without alcohol or drugs. Approximately 3,000 to 4,000 people were expected to attend in 2009 and 2011, respectively. The late-2025 event was held at the Oregon Convention Center.

== Public transit and other transportation services ==
The city has extended TriMet and Portland Streetcar public transit service on New Year's Eve, offering free rides after 8 p.m. The Portland Bureau of Transportation has also offered rideshare coupons as part of the Safe Ride Home Program. In late 2024, the program helped approximately 2,100 people "celebrate New Year's Eve responsibly and return home safely, according to the city".

== See also ==
- Culture of Portland, Oregon
