= Grand Hallway =

US musical group

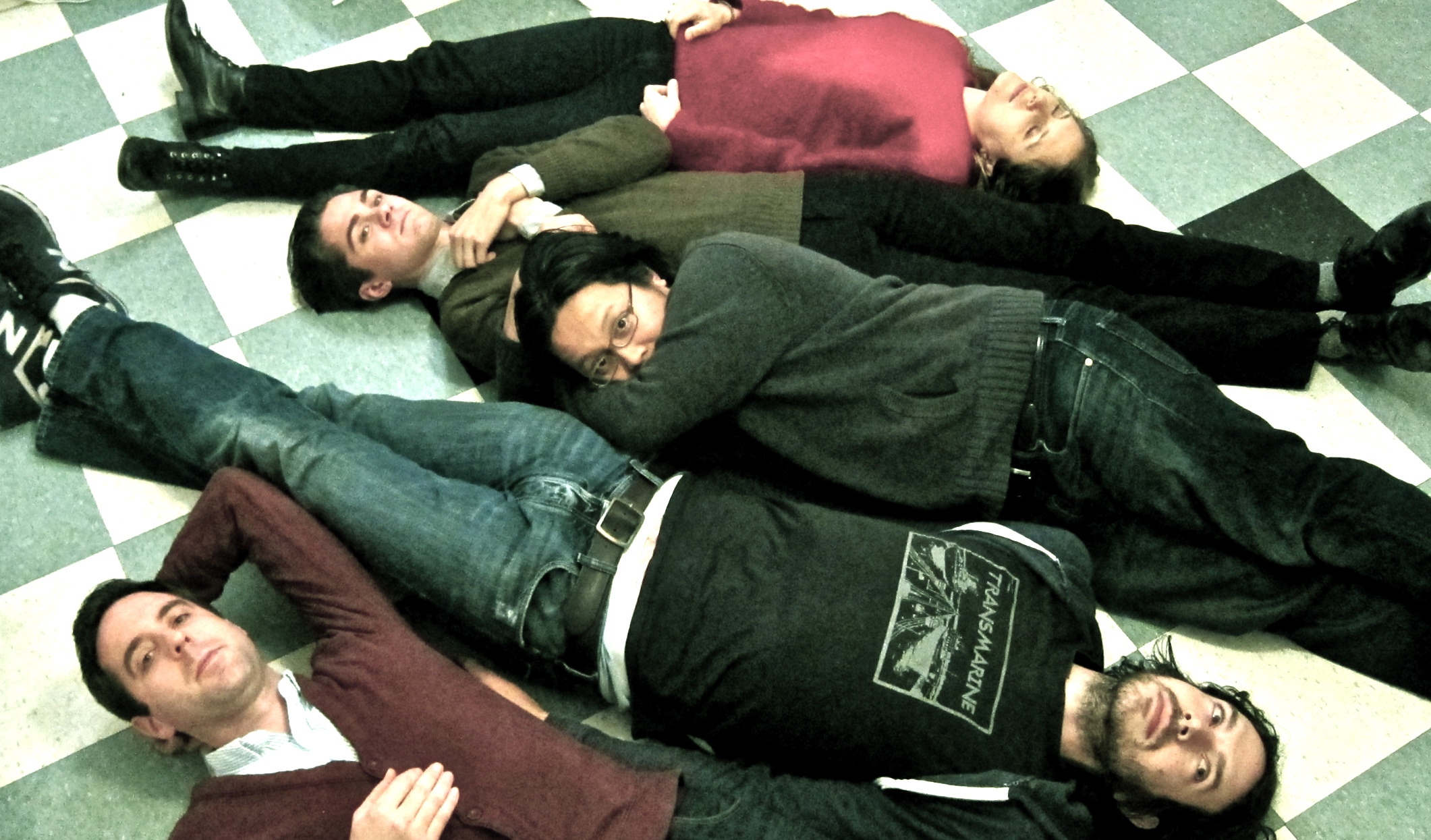

Background information
- Origin: Seattle, Washington, U.S.
- Genres: indie folk, chamber pop, art rock
- Years active: 2007-present
- Labels: Porchlight (U.S.); Sideout (Japan)
- Members: Tomo Nakayama; Brian Wright; Chris Early; Jaclyn Shumate; Aaron Otheim
- Past members: Kevin Large; Jeramy Koepping; Erik Neumann; Bob Roberts; Alina To; Esther Shin; Chris Zasche; Joel Harmon; Shenandoah Davis; Maria Mannisto
- Website: Official website

Grand Hallway is an American rock band from Seattle, Washington, led by singer and multi-instrumentalist Tomo Nakayama. Their sound is described variously as chamber pop, indie folk, and art rock.

== History ==
Grand Hallway began as a recording project between singer/songwriter Tomo Nakayama and producer Jeramy Koepping. After the dissolution of his first band, Asahi, Nakayama sought a different direction from that band's guitar-based indie rock sound. Using the piano as his main instrument, Nakayama began to write songs inspired by artists such as Nina Simone, Neil Young, and John Lennon. After playing a handful of solo shows, Nakayama recruited bassist Erik Neumann and drummer Bob Roberts, and along with Koepping on guitar, began playing out in earnest as Grand Hallway. Strong word of mouth based on a four song demo and live shows opening for the likes of Damien Jurado led to The Stranger declaring them one of the "10 Emerging Bands of 2007."

=== Yes is the Answer (2007) ===
The basic tracks for Grand Hallway's debut album, Yes is the Answer, were recorded in 3 days at Jack Straw Productions through a grant received from their Artist Support Program. Engineering was performed by Moe Provencher, and overdubs and mixing were completed over the following summer by Jeramy Koepping. What began as a minimalist collection of piano/bass/drums songs grew into a full, chamber-pop sound with the addition of a string quartet. The cover art was hand drawn by Japanese artist Heisuke Kitazawa, after a chance meeting with Nakayama at an art show in Seattle. Yes is the Answer was released in Japan on Sideout Records (Bright Eyes, Nada Surf, The Velvet Teen), and self-released by the band in the U.S. The album was received warmly in both countries. The Stranger praised it, saying it "glows brightly with warm, delicate orchestration and thoughtful song structures." In September 2007, joined by new members Alina To and Jaclyn Shumate on violins, Grand Hallway toured Japan with fellow Seattle band Arthur & Yu and Japanese singer/songwriter Shugo Tokumaru.

=== Promenade (2009) ===
Shortly after touring in Japan and recording the EP We Flew Ephemera, Bob Roberts left the band to pursue his career as a video game designer, and was replaced by Joel Harmon. Grand Hallway spent 2008 touring the west coast and performing in that year's Sasquatch! Music Festival. During this time, Erik Neumann left the band, and bassist Kevin Large and multi-instrumentalist Chris Zasche joined as full-time members. That fall, the band entered Studio Litho with engineer Shawn Simmons and began work on their second album, Promenade. Nakayama switched back from piano to guitar as his primary instrument, and the band's sound began to evolve in a larger, more densely orchestrated direction. The record was released in September 2009, with the band accompanied by new member Shenandoah Davis, as well as a 30 piece orchestra and children's choir. Promenade was praised for its intricate arrangements and memorable songwriting, and received heavy airplay and landed on the best-of-year lists of KEXP and NPR Music. The single "Raindrops (Matsuri)" was placed on Amazon.com's Best Songs of 2009 list. In January 2010 Seattle publication City Arts Magazine placed the band on the cover and called them "Seattle's Next Big Band."

=== Winter Creatures (2011) ===
Grand Hallway spent the majority of 2010 on tour, playing at SXSW, CMJ, Bumbershoot, and Capitol Hill Block Party. They played with bands such as Shearwater, Cave Singers, and The Thermals, and developed a strong fanbase of their own. In the fall of 2010, Harmon and Zasche left the band, and Grand Hallway began work on their third album, Winter Creatures. They opted to record this time in Portland, Oregon with producer Cory Gray. Nakayama recorded a majority of the drum parts until Brian Wright joined the band in the winter of 2010. Inspired by the death of Nakayama's grandparents, the birth of Koepping’s son, and the closing of the beloved Seattle landmark Neptune Theater (where Nakayama worked for almost a decade), the album took a much more personal and meditative tone than Promenade's ebullient love songs. Still, the album was well received, with Groovemine noting its "more minimal direction, eschewing the orchestral microcosms and child choirs of past efforts and moving on from the typical Northwestern everything-but-the-kitchen-sink ensemble." Winter Creatures was released in June 2011 by Porchlight Records, who also reissued Promenade on vinyl.

=== Horses (2013) ===
In 2012, after seeing Nakayama perform in an a capella show, director Lynn Shelton approached him about performing in her next feature film. The resulting film, Touchy Feely premiered at the Sundance Film Festival in January 2013, and starred Elliot Page, Rosemarie DeWitt, Josh Pais, Scoot McNairy, and Nakayama, making his acting debut. Nakayama composed and performed the song "Horses" specifically for the film, and it was released as a single by Versicolor Records in August, 2013. USA Today called the song "arresting" and The New York Times cited Nakayama's singing in the film as its "most compelling moment."

== Discography ==
=== Albums ===
- Yes is the Answer (2007, Sideout)
- Promenade (2009, Self-Released/Porchlight)
- Winter Creatures (2011, Porchlight)

=== EPs/Singles/Live Albums ===
- We Flew Ephemera (2008)
- Live at the Triple Door (2010)
- Songs For Japan (2011)
- Horses (2013, Versicolor)
