= Greatest Tits =

EP by Thunderpussy
- Released: February 23, 2018
- Genre: Hard rock
- Label: Republic/Stardog Records/Virgin EMI
- Producer: Sylvia Massy, Mike McCready

Thunderpussy chronology
Greatest Tits (2018)	Thunderpussy (2018)

Greatest Tits is the debut EP from Seattle hard rock band Thunderpussy, released digitally on February 23, 2018. The band described it as a "taste tester, tongue teaser, titty twister" in advance of their full-length album Thunderpussy.

The cover design featuring two lemons was the result of a collaboration between guitarist Whitney Petty and graphic designer Ashley Pawlak from Universal Records. The songs selected for the EP were intended to "represent the band in a diverse manner", three hard rock songs contrasting with the power ballad "Torpedo Love." Bassist Leah Julius refers to the lesbian song "Speed Queen" as "just a good straightforward rock tune, you know, like roll-the-windows-down." The video for "Torpedo Love" was recorded inside the cooling tower of an abandoned nuclear power plant, which provided enhanced acoustics.

== Track listing ==
All songs written by Whitney Petty and Molly Sides

1. "Speed Queen" – 4:08
2. "Velvet Noose" – 3:45
3. "Torpedo Love" – 5:12
4. "Gentle Frame" – 3:15

== Personnel ==
- Molly Sides – vocals
- Whitney Petty – guitar
- Leah Julius – bass
- Ruby Dunphy – drums
