= The Maldives (band) =

American alternative country band

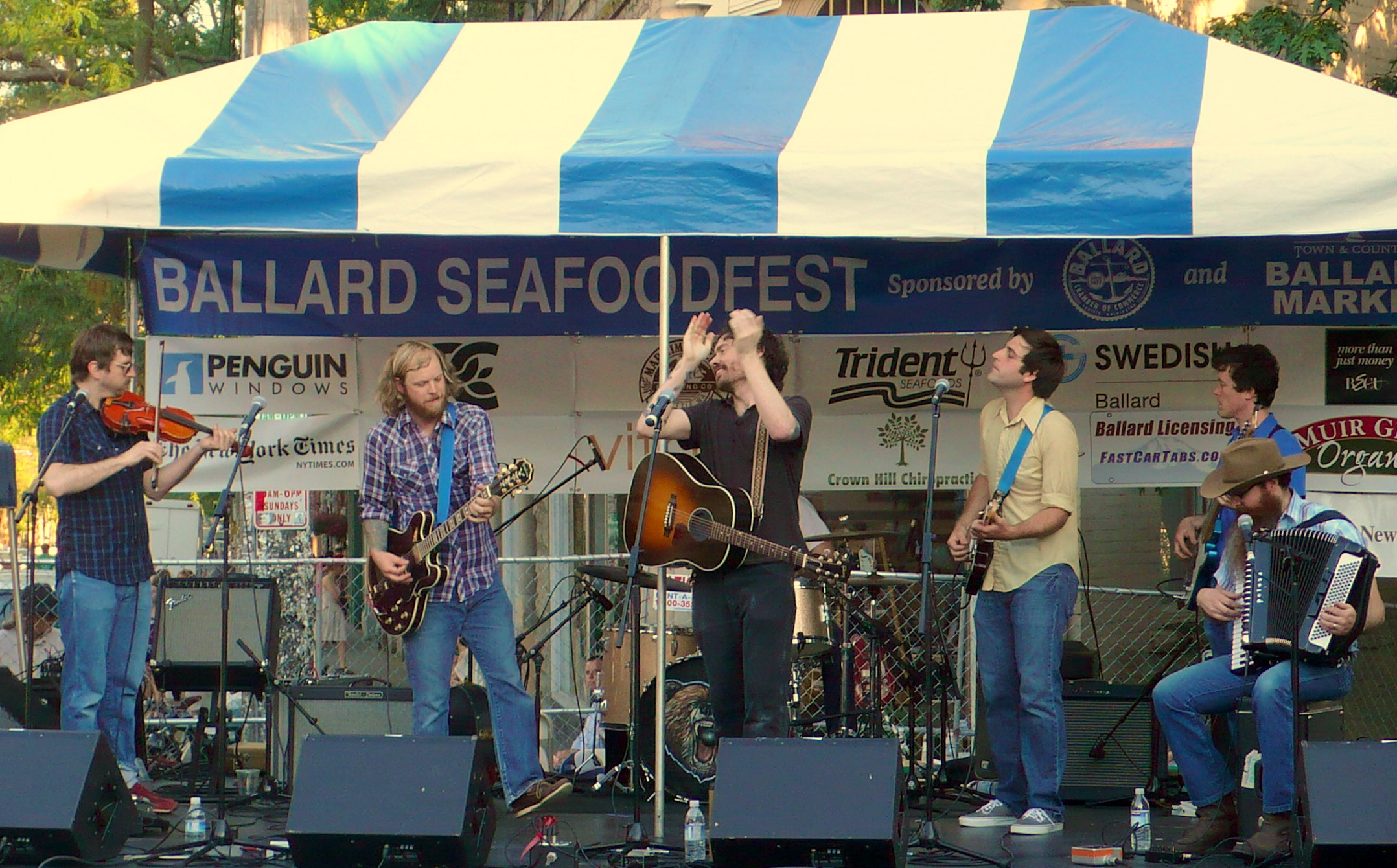
- The Maldives performing at Ballard Seafood Fest

Background information
- Origin: Seattle, Washington, U.S.
- Genres: Alternative country, rock
- Years active: 2002–present
- Members: Jason Dodson; Kevin Barrans; Tim Gadbois; Chris Warner; Jesse Bonn; Adam Bily; Faustine Hudson
- Past members: Ryan McMackin; Chris Zache; Tomo Nakayama; Seth Warren
- Website: http://themaldivesmusic.com/

The Maldives are an alt-country band from Seattle, Washington, known for sold-out live performances described by KEXP-FM as "transcendent".

== History ==
The band has released three full-length albums and one EP. Their 2009 album Listen To The Thunder was rated the second best "Northwest Album" of 2009 by Sound on the Sound. Seattle radio station 90.3 KEXP described their most recent album, Muscle for the Wing, as having "a grittier, more guitar-oriented roots-rock sound." The Maldives regularly play in Seattle and throughout the West Coast and have performed at the Sasquatch!, Bumbershoot, South by Southwest, Capitol Hill Block Party, and Treefort Music Fest.

The Maldives provided live orchestration for the 1925 silent movie Riders of the Purple Sage as part of the 2010 Seattle International Film Festival and again for the 2013 festival, scoring the silent film The Wind. They are based in the Ballard neighborhood of Seattle and were filmed playing there as part of MTV's online series, $5 Cover: Seattle.

In addition to traditional rock instrumentation, the members of the band play banjo and accordion. Once described as "the best unsigned band in Seattle", The Maldives have released albums on Spark & Shine Records and Mt. Fuji Records.

== Discography ==
- The Maldives (2006)
- Tequila / Someday (2009)
- Listen To The Thunder (2009)
- Muscle For The Wing (Oct 2012)
- Mad Lives (2017)
