= DJ Anjali and the Incredible Kid =

American DJ duo

DJ Anjali & The Incredible Kid
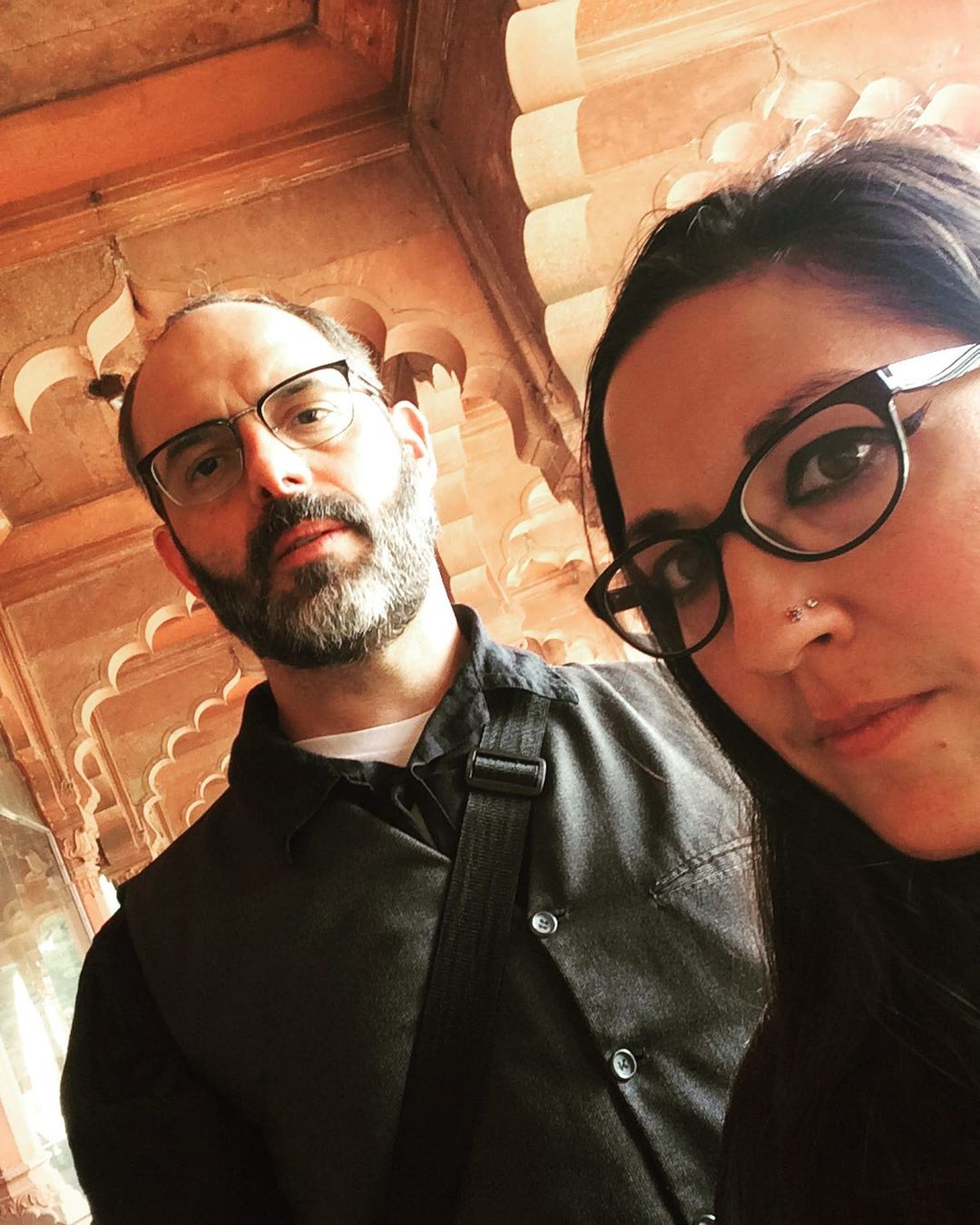

Background information
- Origin: Portland, Oregon, U.S.
- Genres: Bhangra; Bollywood; Reggaeton; Latin club music
- Years active: 2000–present
- Members: DJ Anjali; The Incredible Kid
- Website: anjaliandthekid.com

DJ Anjali & The Incredible Kid is an American DJ duo, formed in 2000 in Portland, Oregon. The duo consists of Anjali Hursh (DJ Anjali) and Stephen Strausbaugh (The Incredible Kid). In addition to appearing at various venues in Portland's nightclub scene, the act has performed in numerous music festivals and resident nights including Sasquatch and Basement Bhangra and is credited with helping to bring South Asian and Latin dance music to the club scene in Portland and the greater Pacific Northwest. Together they host Tropitaal, a "Desi-Latino Soundclash" and Andaz, the longest-running Bhangra and Bollywood dance party in the United States. The duo was awarded first place in the "Best DJ" category of "Best of Portland" by Willamette Week readers in 2016 and 2017.

== History ==
Hursh and Strausbaugh first crossed paths in the late 90's when they both became involved in union organizing while working at Powell's Books. At the time Strausbaugh was playing sets at private parties and providing entertainment at pro-union events. After collaborating on several such events, the two formed a partnership and made their first foray into the nightclub scene in 2000, hosting a successful new years party at Medicine Hat. This was followed by brief stints at The Blackbird and Lola's Room, until 2002 when they took over a monthly night at Fez Ballroom, the venue that would become home to their Andaz party for the next 7.5 years. Since departing from that venue in April 2010, editions of Andaz have been held at Star Theater, The Analog, and The Liquor Store and have routinely drawn crowds of 300 people.

In 2003, they teamed up with DJ E3 to form Atlas, a dance party that combined their South Asian format with a more broadly international sound that included Dancehall, Reggaeton, Baile Funk, and other genres. The series lasted 10 years. At the time this was the longest of any resident night ever at Holocene, and it played host to many national and international touring acts such as Toy Selectah, Poirier, and J Boogie. It was at the end of this run that they launched their new series, Tropitaal at the Goodfoot Pub & Lounge in Portland's Kerns Neighborhood. The night is described as a "Desi/Latino Soundclash". Hursh and Strausbaugh have taken Tropitaal on the road, holding editions of the series in Seattle and Oakland.

== Reception ==
The duo's unusual career path has attracted attention from the international press, with coverage in The Times Of India and GQ India. Reviews note the contrast between their parties and the more mainstream Indian dance club events found elsewhere, pointing out the greater emphasis on bhangra and the queer-friendly, mixed-race audience.

In 2021, Anjali's likeness was featured on a bus wrap affixed to TriMet buses as part of a campaign to celebrate Portland's AAPI history and leaders.

== Festivals & Guest Appearances ==
- Sasquatch! Music Festival
- Decibel Festival
- MusicfestNW
- Beloved Festival
- Matatu
- Photosynthesis Festival
- Soul'd Out Music Festival
- Fairytale Music Festival
- Kaleidoscope Music Festival
- Oregon Country Fair
- Indian Summer
- Bhangratheque
- Non Stop Bhangra
- Basement Bhangra
- iBomba
- Ottomania
- Vancouver Queer Film Festival
- Vancouver International Bhangra Celebration
