= Mad Rad =

American hip hop group

Mad Rad is a Seattle-based hip hop/electronic music group that consists of five members; three vocalists, a DJ, and a drummer. Four members of Mad Rad have stage names which are as follows; Nathan Quiroga (Buffalo Madonna), Peter Robinson (P Smoov), Gregory Smith (Terry Radjaw), Ty Finnan (DJ Darwin), and their drummer's name is Trent Moorman. Mad Rad formed in 2007 and have released two full-length albums, their most recent in 2010 (The Youth Die Young).

Mad Rad has been classified in several different music genres and are widely popular in Seattle for their similarities to a genre called Hipster hop, also known as Third-Wave hip hop. Mad Rad member P Smoov is the main producer of all of Mad Rad's music. P Smoov attended Full Sail University in Winter Park, Florida. P Smoov is also one part of the Seattle-based hip-hop duo Fresh Espresso.

== Critical reception ==
The debut album "White Gold" was very well received by independent music review blogs and websites. CdUniverse calls them the best hip hop act to come out of Seattle since the 1987 release "Posse on Broadway" by Sir Mix-a-Lot. Local news-weekly Seattle Weekly admired the album for making "hip hop for club kids", and for having a sound that transcends the northwest hip hop style, sounding instead like fresh global hip hop that could have come from New York or London and could be played across the country.

The album "The Youth Die Young" has received widespread coverage, with generally positive reviews, giving credit to the group for maturing beyond their concert-oriented roots. A review for NPR by Cheryl Waters gives them credit for, as the band members say, "stepping up their game", balancing hip-hop lyrics over electronic beats.

== Exposure ==
On July 6, 2010, Spin Magazine named Mad Rad the "Best-Kept Seattle Secret". In November 2010, Mad Rad was featured on Seattle independent radio station KEXP's Song of the Day blog for their song "The Youth Die Young". Mad Rad has performed at multiple music festivals in the Pacific Northwest including Bumbershoot, Capitol Hill Block Party, and Sasquatch.

== Controversies ==
Mad Rad was involved in an incident at local Seattle club, Neumos. The incident sent three of the five members of Mad Rad to jail for two nights. They were banned from Neumos in early 2009, but the ban has since been lifted as of early 2010. Their return show to the Neumos, which was a free show, took place on January 21, 2010. The group was also reportedly banned from five other clubs in Seattle's Capitol Hill neighborhood; King Cobra, Havana, The Saint, The War Room and Chop Suey.

== Discography ==
- White Gold (2008)
  - Label: Out For Stardom
- The Youth Die Young (2010)
  - Label: Out For Stardom
