= Thunderpussy (album) =

Studio album by Thunderpussy
- Released: May 25, 2018
- Genre: Hard rock
- Length: 54:23
- Label: Stardog Records / Republic Records
- Producer: Sylvia Massy

Thunderpussy chronology
Greatest Tits EP (2018)	Thunderpussy (2018)	West (2024)

Singles from Thunderpussy
- 1. "Velvet Noose"; 2. "Speed Queen"

Thunderpussy is the debut studio album by the Seattle hard rock band Thunderpussy. It was produced and engineered by Sylvia Massy. Work on the recording began in September 2016 at Massy's home studio, Foundation Soundstage, in Ashland, Oregon. The first single, "Velvet Noose," was recorded at Hockey Talkter Studios, produced by Mike McCready and engineered by Josh Evans. The album was released on May 25, 2018.

The band included the eponymous track "Thunderpussy" on this album as their theme song, commenting "Every band should have a theme song, especially if your band is called 'Thunderpussy'." They remarked, "This was our big chance to do what we had always wanted since the first time we heard 'Bad Company' by Bad Company: write a self-titled track."

== Track listing ==
All songs by Whitney Petty and Molly Sides

1. "Speed Queen" – 4:08
2. "Badlands" – 3:43
3. "Fever" – 4:55
4. "Torpedo Love" – 5:11
5. "Velvet Noose" – 3:44
6. "Gentle Frame" – 3:15
7. "All In" – 4:08
8. "The Cloud" – 4:34
9. "Pick It Up" – 3:32
10. "Utero Tango" – 3:59
11. "Thunderpussy" – 3:58
12. "Young and Pure" – 6:16

== Personnel ==
Thunderpussy

- Molly Sides – vocals, theremin
- Whitney Petty – guitars, backing vocals, harmonica
- Leah Julius – bass guitar, backing vocals
- Ruby Dunphy – drums, percussion, vibraphone

Additional musicians

- Mike McCready – guitar on "Velvet Noose" and "The Cloud"
- Josh Evans – mellotron on "The Cloud"; stylophone and Fender Rhodes on "Pick It Up"
- Graig Markel – acid eagle noises on "Thunderpussy"
- Jordan Volker – violin on "Torpedo Love"
- Brianna Atwell – viola on "Torpedo Love"
- Alex Ho – cello on "Torpedo Love"
