= Expanding Anyway =

Studio album by Morning Teleportation
- Released: March 8, 2011
- Genres: Psychedelic, Electro, Roots
- Length: 58:12
- Label: Glacial Pace Recordings
- Producer: Isaac Brock

Professional ratings
Review scores
Source	Rating
Consequence of Sound	C−
Willamette Week	4/5 stars

Expanding Anyway is the debut full-length album by psychedelic rock band Morning Teleportation. The album was released on Glacial Pace Recordings on March 8, 2011.

== Critical reception ==
Spin wrote that the band's "energy can be so overpowering that it takes a minute to notice the adeptness of the musicianship — [frontman Tiger] Merritt’s exciting prog guitar riffs make the nine-minute 'Wholehearted Drifting Sense of Inertia' feel too short." NPR called the album "a raw and tantalizing piece of work." PopMatters wrote that Morning Teleportation's "sloppy, anything-goes aesthetic makes their debut album an unhinged ball of fun."

== Track listing ==
No.	Title	Length
1.	"Boom Puma"	5:26
2.	"Eyes The Same"	3:13
3.	"Snow Frog Vs. Motor Cobra"	5:52
4.	"Expanding Anyway"	3:42
5.	"Crystalline"	5:12
6.	"Daydream Electric Storm"	2:15
7.	"Whole Hearted Drifting Sense Of Inertia"	9:01
8.	"Just A Figment"	6:28
9.	"Foreign Planes"	4:42
10.	"Coldweather Sunshine"	1:39
11.	"Banjo Disco"	4:26
12.	"Treble Chair"	6:25
