= Morning Teleportation =

Background information
- Origin: Bowling Green, Kentucky, United States
- Genre: Psychedelic rock
- Years active: 2005–present
- Label: Glacial Pace Recordings
- Members: Travis Goodwin; Joseph Jones; Alex Lindsey
- Past members: Tiger Merritt (deceased) Paul Wilkerson; Tres Coker
- Website: link

Morning Teleportation is an American psychedelic rock band formed in 2005 when Bowling Green, Kentucky, United States, natives Travis Goodwin (keyboards), Tres Coker (drums), and Paul Wilkerson (bass) met up with Chicago transplant Tiger Merritt (vocals/guitar), who had just moved to their hometown for college. They played at Electric Forest Festival, Bonnaroo Music Festival, and Sasquatch! Music Festival and supported The Flaming Lips, Cage The Elephant, Primus and Modest Mouse.

== History ==
In 2009, the band signed to Glacial Pace Recordings. On March 8, 2011, their debut album, Expanding Anyway, was released on both vinyl and compact disc. The record was produced by Modest Mouse vocalist Isaac Brock.

In 2011, Wilkerson left the band. In 2012, Coker was replaced with Joseph Jones. Alex Lindsey, brother of Mona bassist Zach Lindsey, also joined the band full-time on bass. Also in April 2012, Merritt revealed in an interview that the band had moved back to their hometown, Bowling Green, Kentucky to write material for their next album. The band released their second studio album in 2017.

On April 4, 2019, the band announced through their Facebook page that frontman Tiger Merritt had died.

== Discography ==
=== Studio albums ===
- Expanding Anyway (2011)
- Salivating for Symbiosis (2017)
