= Pickwick (band) =

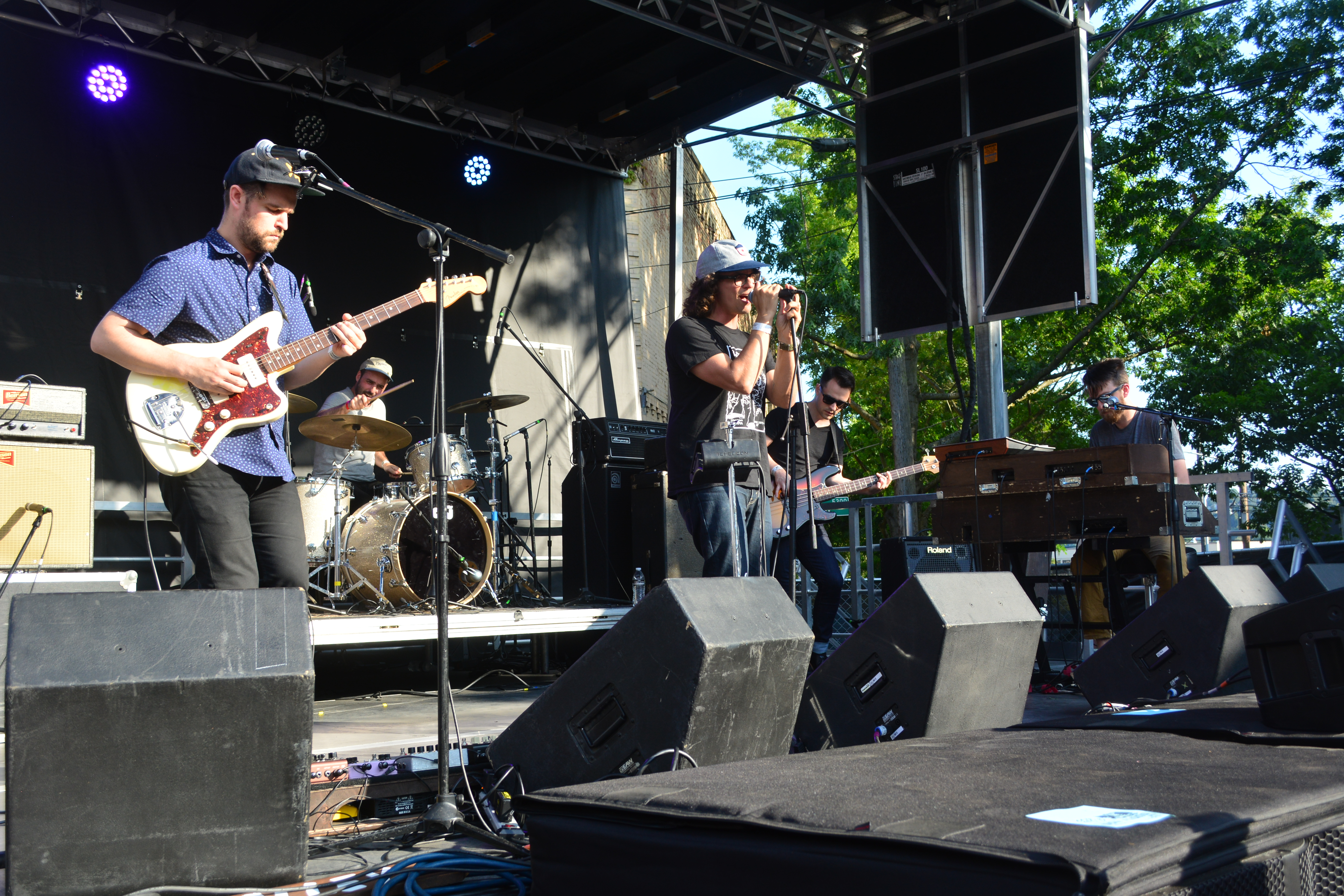
- Pickwick playing an outdoor show in Seattle's Ballard neighborhood, 2019

Background information
- Origin: Seattle, Washington, United States
- Genres: Indie rock, garage rock, R&B
- Years active: 2008–present
- Labels: Small Press, Dine Alone
- Members: Galen Disston; Garret Parker; Michael Parker; Kory Kruckenberg; Cassady Lillstrom; Alex Westcoat
- Website: pickwickmusic.com

Pickwick is an American indie rock, garage rock, R&B band from Seattle, Washington.

The group initially started out as a folk band, but after a 2008 tour in California the group discarded its material and changed their sound. The band's name stems from Pickwick Records, where Lou Reed was employed as a songwriter in the 1960s.

The group released a series of three 7" singles, also issued digitally, in 2011, and compiled them on a CD-EP entitled Myths. This was one of the best-selling albums in local Seattle stores in 2012. On the strength of their early single releases, they began selling out local shows in Seattle at venues such as the Neptune and the Showbox at the Market.

The band's debut full-length, Can't Talk Medicine, was released independently in the United States and on Dine Alone Records in Canada on March 12, 2013. Bandmember Kory Kruckenberg, who won a Grammy in 2010 for Best Engineered Classical Album, produced the album with the band. The group recruited Sharon Van Etten to sing on Can't Talk Medicine. She sings on the track "Lady Luck", a Richard Swift cover. Swift also collaborated on the album.

Reviews of Can't Talk Medicine likened the band to The Black Keys, Alabama Shakes, and Sam Cooke.

== Members ==
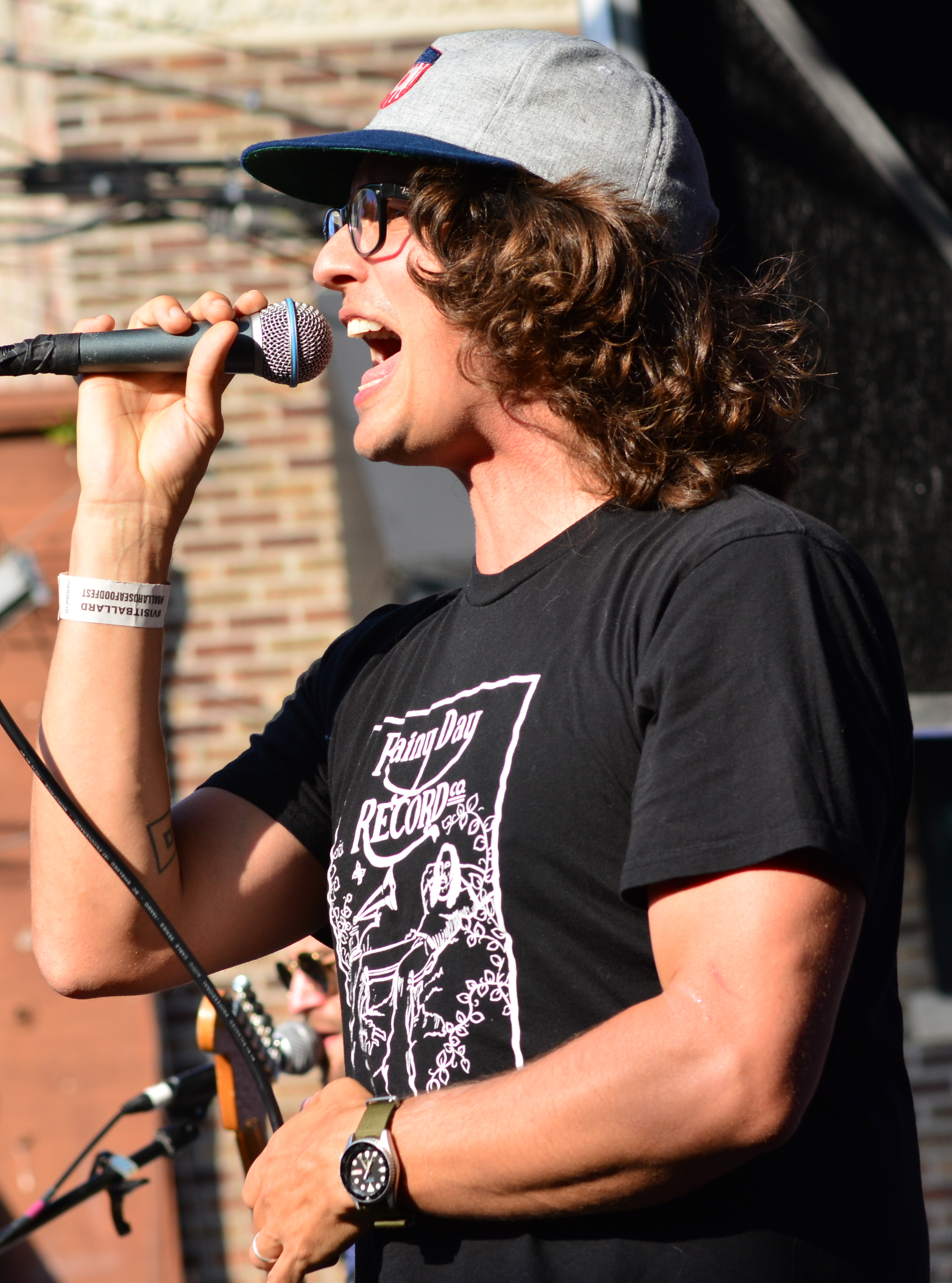
Galen Disston

Pickwick began as a folk band with Galen Disston and Matthew Emmett; in 2008, the band grew to five members, adding Cassady Lillstrom, Garrett Parker and Michael Parker. They subsequently added "producer, engineer, percussionist and mentor (aka 'father figure') Kory Kruckenberg."

- Galen Disston - vocals
- Garrett Parker - bass
- Michael Parker - guitar
- Kory Kruckenberg - vibraphone
- Cassady Lillstrom - keyboard
- Alex Westcoat - drums

== Discography ==
- Demo 2008 (self-released, 2008)
- Myths EP (self-released, 2011)
- Covers EP (self-released, 2013)
- Can't Talk Medicine (Small Press/Dine Alone, 2013)
- LoveJoys (2017)
- Myths & Rarities (2019)
