= Analog Café and Theater =

Defunct cafe and music venue in Portland, Oregon, U.S.

- The Analog
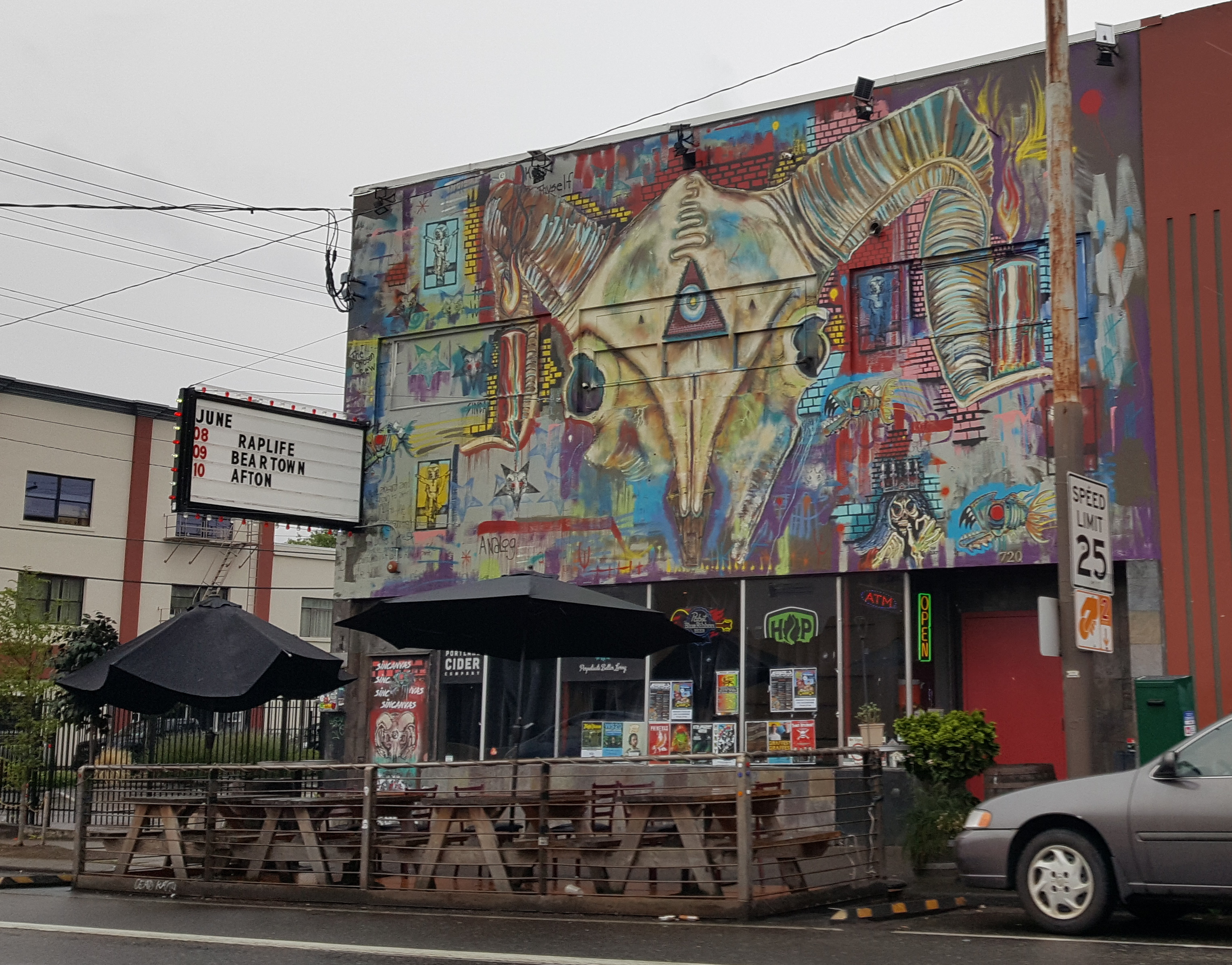
- The venue's exterior in 2018
- Interactive map of Analog Café and Theater
- Address: 720 Southeast Hawthorne Boulevard
- Location: Portland, Oregon, United States
- Coordinates: 45.51209°N 122.65819°W
- Owner: Donnie Rife

Analog Café and Theater, or simply The Analog, was a cafe and music venue in Portland, Oregon's Hosford-Abernethy neighborhood, in the United States. The venue also hosts DRD Records.

== History ==
In May 2018, the venue's owner was accused of sexual harassment, causing some musicians to cancel performances. Donnie Rife denied the anonymous accusations, and decided to leave. New owners were expected by mid-May. The venue has closed, as of 2019. As of 2025, the space is operating under new management as the High Limit Room.

=== Events ===
Analog has hosted a variety of music acts, including Mitski in 2016, Sunny Sweeney in 2017, and Dark Funeral in 2018. Immediately after cannabis became legal in Oregon on July 1, 2015, Rife hosted "Free Marijuana Mondays".

== See also ==
- Culture of Portland, Oregon
