= Unrepentant (disambiguation) =

Repentance is reviewing one's actions and feeling contrition or regret for past wrongs.

Unrepentant may also refer to:

- Unrepentant (album), album by Greg Koch 2017
- Unrepentant Geraldines, album by Tori Amos 2014
- Unrepentant Geraldines Tour, concert tour by Tori Amos 2014
- Woes to the unrepentant cities, text in Matthew's gospel

== See also ==
- Repentance (disambiguation)
