= List of signature model bass guitars =

A bass guitar or simply bass is a plucked string instrument in the guitar family of stringed instruments. They can be electric bass or acoustic bass. In many genres, it has largely replaced the double bass. As with its electric guitar and acoustic guitar counterparts, music from the mid-20th century has led to various instrument manufacturers producing signature models that are endorsed by an artist.

== A ==
Artist	Model	Company	Production lifetime	Notes	Ref.
Adam Clayton	Adam Clayton Jazz	Fender			
Adam Clayton	Adam Clayton Signature	Warwick	2019–present	Artist Line of RockBass	
Adam "Nolly" Getgood	NG Adam "Nolly" Getgood Signature	Dingwall		Available in gloss metallic black, matte ducati pearl white, gloss black forest green, matte gold metallic, celestial blue	
Alex Webster	Euro5 LX Alex Webster	Spector		Available in solid black and blood red drip	
Alex Webster	Legend 5 Alex Webster	Spector			
Allen Woody	Rumbelkat	Epiphone			
Andrew Gouche	Kingston Andrew Gouche	MTD			

== B ==
Artist	Model	Company	Production lifetime	Notes	Ref.
Blu DeTiger	Limited Player Plus x Blu DeTiger Jazz Bass	Fender	2024-present		
Bootsy Collins	Space Bass	Warwick	2019–present		
Bryan Beller	BBM5	Mike Lull			
Bryan Beller	BBMF5	Mike Lull			

== C ==
Artist	Model	Company	Production lifetime	Notes	Ref.
Chris Kael	Signature Warlock	B.C. Rich			
Cliff Burton	Aria Pro II Cliff Burton	Aria		Based on his custom Aria Pro II	
Cliff Williams	Cliff Williams Icon Series StingRay	Music Man			
Charles Berthoud	Charles Berthoud CB-4 (Also come in CB-5 for the five string and CB-6 for the six string bass)	Schecter	2023-present	The Schecter Charles Berthoud CB-4 Is a four string bass released by Schecter in late November 2023 for high performance multi-finger tapping crazy slapping and sweeping chordal arrangements all made to meet the enthusiastic demands of the skillful internet virtuoso bassist Charles Berthoud. It has a sharp aggressive double-cutaway top and a highly figure le flammed maple top finished with See-through satin. It has a thin neck, 24 jumbo frets and very low action making it built for speed, something Charles Berthoud immensely relus one making it the perfect bass for all those who want to reach his level of expertise.	

== D ==
Artist	Model	Company	Production lifetime	Notes	Ref.
Dan Briggs	NS-2000/5	Spector			
Daniel Firth	Hellraiser Extreme-5 Signature	Schecter			
Dale Stewart	Avenger	Schecter	2012-present		
Dave Ellefson	X Series Signature David Ellefson Concert Bass CBX IV	Jackson			
Davie Biale aka Davie504	Retrovibe EVO Davie504 Signature	Chowny	2017	Available in black burst, blue burst, green burst, red burst, purple burst. Also available in left-handed.	
Doug Wimbish	Euro4 LX Doug Wimbish	Spector			
Dug Pinnick	Baron-H	Schecter		Available in a left-handed model	
Dug Pinnick	DP-12	Schecter		Available in a left-handed model	
Duff McKagan	Duff McKagan Precision	Fender			
Duff McKagan	Duff McKagan Deluxe Precision	Fender		Available in black or white pearl with a rosewood fretboard	

== E ==
Artist	Model	Company	Production lifetime	Notes	Ref.
Eva Gardner	Squier Eva Gardner Precision Bass	Fender Squier	2014		

== F ==
Artist	Model	Company	Production lifetime	Notes	Ref.
Flea	Flea Jazz	Fender			
Frank Bello	Pro-Mod So-Cal PJ IV	Charvel	2022	EMG® Frank Bello Signature P/J pickups. HiMass™ bridge, Graph Tech® TUSQ® XL.	

== G ==
Artist	Model	Company	Production lifetime	Notes	Ref.
Gary Willis	GWB1005-NTF	Ibanez		Fretless in black flat	
Gary Willis	GWB35-BKF	Ibanez		Fretless in natural flat	
Geddy Lee	Geddy Lee Jazz	Fender		Available in 3-colour sunburst and black with a maple fretboard.	
Geddy Lee	Limited Edition USA Geddy Lee Jazz	Fender	2015	Crimson red with pickguard. 100 were produced.	
Geddy Lee	USA Geddy Lee Jazz	Fender			
Gene Simmons	G2 Thunderbird	Gibson		Pronounced G-squared	
Gerald Veasley	GVB1006	Ibanez		Available in six string, amber coloured models	
Gerald Veasley	GVB36	Ibanez		Available in six string, amber coloured models	

== H ==
Artist	Model	Company	Production lifetime	Notes	Ref.
Hans-Jürgen Reznicek	Jäcki Reznicek Signature	Warwick			

== I ==
Artist	Model	Company	Production lifetime	Notes	Ref.
Ian Hill	Euro4 Ian Hill Limited Edition	Spector	Available in solid white and solid black		
Ida Nielsen	California Ida Nielsen	Sandberg Guitars			

== J ==
Artist	Model	Company	Production lifetime	Notes	Ref.
Jaco Pastorius	Jaco Pastorius Jazz Bass	Fender			
Jack Bruce	Jack Bruce #13-2324	Warwick			
Jack Bruce	Jack Bruce Artist Series	Warwick			
Jack Bruce	Jack Bruce Signature	Warwick			
Jack Bruce	Jack Bruce Survivor #13-2586	Warwick			
Jack Bruce	Jack Bruce Survivor #20-4177	Warwick			
Jack Casady	Jack Casady Bass	Epiphone			
John Campbell	JC-4	ESP		Dark grey metallic satin	
John DeServio	JD DeServio J-4	Schecter		Gloss black with "BLS" distressed flag	
John Entwistle	John Entwistle Hybrid	Dean			
John Entwistle	John Entwistle Hybrid 5-String	Dean	2013		
John Entwistle	John Entwistle Spider	Dean			
John Entwistle	USA John Entwistle Hybrid	Dean			
John Entwistle	USA John Entwistle Spider	Dean			
John Myung	Bongo 6 HH	Music Man			
John Paul Jones	Signature E-Bass	Manson	2021-present	Comes in flame top gloss vintage sunburst, quilt top gloss vintage sunburst, and quilt top trans satin black burst	
Johnny Christ	Johnny Christ	Schecter		Available in 5-string and left-handed models	
Jonas Hellborg	Jonas Hellborg Signature	Warwick			
Jonas Hellborg	Jonas Hellborg Signature #15-2938	Warwick		Fretless	
Jonas Hellborg	Jonas Hellborg Signature #16-3306	Warwick			
Jonas Hellborg	Jonas Hellborg Signature #20-4172	Warwick			
Justin Meldal-Johnsen	JMJ Road Worn Mustang	Fender		Available in faded Daphne and black with a rosewood fretboard	

== K ==
Artist	Model	Company	Production lifetime	Notes	Ref.
King Ov Hell	Mephisto King Ov Hell Signature	Schecter			

== L ==
Artist	Model	Company	Production lifetime	Notes	Ref.
Leland Sklar	Lee Sklar II Signature	Dingwall		Available in any candy, metallic, or pearl Dingwall colours	
Leland Sklar	SklarBass I Signature	Warwick		Artist Line of RockBass available in burgundy blackburst transparent and vintage sunburst	

== M ==
Artist	Model	Company	Production lifetime	Notes	Ref.
Mark Hoppus	Artist Series Signature Jazz Bass	Fender	2003-2015		
Mark Hoppus	Signature Jaguar Bass	Fender	2022-current		
Michael Anthony	Koa Top USA Signature	Schecter			
Michael Anthony	MA-4	Schecter			
Michael Anthony	MA-5	Schecter			
Michael Anthony	Michael Anthony	Schecter			
Meshell Ndegeocello	Meshell Ndegeocello Fellowship bass	Reverend Musical Instruments			
Mike D'Antonio	MD85	Ibanez			
Mike Dirnt	Mike Dirnt Road Worn Precision	Fender		Available in white blonde with either a rosewood or maple fretboard	
Mike Kroeger	MK-5 Pro	Spector			
Mikey Way	Signature Jazz Bass	Fender	2023	Limited edition with an alder body and silver sparkle finish.	
Mikey Way	Signature Mustang Bass	Squier	2012-2015	Finished in large flake silver sparkle with a black competition stripe, pick guard, and rosewood fretboard	

== N ==
Artist	Model	Company	Production lifetime	Notes	Ref.
Nadja Peulen	Nadja Peulen NP-4	Schecter			
Nate Mendel	Nate Mendel P Bass	Fender			
Nathan East	BBNE2	Yamaha		Available in black and white	
Nikki Sixx	J-4 Sixx	Schecter			
Nikki Sixx	Schecter Sixx Bass	Schecter		Available in a left-handed model	

== P ==
Artist	Model	Company	Production lifetime	Notes	Ref.
Paz Lenchantin	LUNA Paz 5 Paz Lenchantin Signature 5-string Bass	Luna Guitars	2008		
Peter Hook	Peter Hook Signature BB	Yamaha			

== R ==
Artist	Model	Company	Production lifetime	Notes	Ref.
Rachel Bolan	Euro4 Rachel Bolan	Spector			
Reginald Arvizu aka Fieldy	K5	Ibanez			
Rex Brown	Rex Brown Reverso	Warwick		Artist Line of RockBass available in solid black and burgundy blackburst	
Rex Brown	Rex Brown Signature Thunderbird	Gibson			
Rhonda Smith	Miezo 18 Rhonda Smith Signature	Maurizio Über		A 16" scale travel bass. Available in 5, 6, and 7-string models.	
Robert Trujillo	Robert Trujillo RockBass	Warwick		Artist Line with 4 and 5-string versions available in solid black satin	
Rudy Sarzo	Euro4 LT Rudy Sarzo	Spector			
Rudy Sarzo	Euro4 LX Rudy Sazro	Spector			

== S ==
Artist	Model	Company	Production lifetime	Notes	Ref.
Scott Whitley	SWB-1 Scott Whitley Signature	Chowny		Available in natural ash, trans tobacco burst, trans white, trans black, trans blue. Also available in a fretless model in the same colours as well as mahogany.	
Sean Yseult	Sean Yseult Signature Casket	Schecter	2012		
Sharlee D'Angelo	SDB3	Ibanez			
Simon Gallup	Ultra Spitfire	Schecter			
Steve Bailey	Steve Bailey Signature	Warwick		Fretless option	
Steve Harris	Steve Harris Precision	Fender			
Stu Cook	SC5	Mike Lull			
Stu Hamm	Stu Hamm Signature	Warwick			
Stu Hamm	Stu Hamm Signature #15-2822	Warwick			
Stu Hamm	Stu Hamm Signature #15-2989	Warwick		Fretless	
Stu Hamm	Stu Hamm Signature #16-3318	Warwick			
Stu Hamm	Stu Hamm Signature #18-3748	Warwick			
Stuart Zender	Stuart Zender Signature	Warwick			
Stuart Zender	Stuart Zender Signature #14-2694	Warwick			
Stuart Zender	Stuart Zender Signature #16-3278	Warwick			
Stuart Zender	Stuart Zender Signature #16-3331	Warwick			
Stuart Zender	Stuart Zender Signature #17-3512	Warwick			

== T ==
Artist	Model	Company	Production lifetime	Notes	Ref.
Thundercat	TCB1006	Ibanez		Six string in autumn leaf burst matte	
Tim Lefebvre	J5 Tim Lefebvre Signature	Maurizio Über			
Tom Araya	TA-204 FRX	ESP			
Tom Araya	TA-604 FRX	ESP			
Tom Araya	Tom Araya FRX	ESP			
Todd Kerns	Anti-Star Signature	Prestige		Comes in black and white	
Tomasz Wróblewski aka Orion	Orion-4	ESP			
Tony Butler	Retrovibe Vantage Tony Butler Signature	Chowny		Available in a left-handed model	
Tony Butler	V4 Black	Vintage			
Tony Franklin	Tony Franklin Fretless Precision Bass	Fender		Available in Lake Placid blue, 3-colour sunburst, and black with an ebony fingerboard	
Troy Sanders	Troy Sanders Jaguar Bass	Fender			

== V ==
Artist	Model	Company	Production lifetime	Notes	Ref.
Verdine White	NYC Custom Verdine White Signature	Sadowsky			

== W ==
Artist	Model	Company	Production lifetime	Notes	Ref.
Will Lee	NYC Custom Will Lee Signature	Sadowsky			

== See also ==
- List of guitars
- List of signature model guitars
