= From The Up'Nuh =

2021 album by Koch Marshall Trio

Studio album by Koch Marshall Trio
- Released: 2021
- Recorded: Milwaukee, Wisconsin
- Studio: Makin' Sausage Music
- Genre: Soul, gospel, blues, funk
- Length: 65.86
- Producer: Steve Hamilton and Koch Marshall Productions

Koch Marshall Trio chronology
Toby Arrives	From The Up'Nuh

From The Up'Nuh is the second studio album by American instrumental band Koch Marshall Trio. It was self-released in 2021 and was produced by Steve Hamilton.

== Background ==
The title of the album came from drummer Dylan Koch's slang for the Koch family's retreat north of Milwaukee in Crivitz, Wisconsin. The band worked with Steve Hamilton, the producer who also worked with them for the 2018 Toby Arrives album. The album was recorded at Makin' Sausage Music studio in Milwaukee.

The first track on the album is called "Luna Girl" and it was written for Greg Koch's cat. The track is recorded in the key of C.

== Track listing ==
All tracks are written by Greg Koch, Toby Lee Marshall and Dylan Koch.

From The Up'Nuh
No.	Title	Length
1.	"Luna Girl"	4:47
2.	"The Tussle"	6:36
3.	"Funky Klaus"	7:25
4.	"Quarantonne"	4:44
5.	"Succulent"	5:33
6.	"A Real Mother for Ya"	5:48
7.	"Brushes"	3:46
8.	"Soul Stroll"	4:42
9.	"Nubby the Hoarder Man"	3:29
10.	"Allora"	7:19
11.	"Drowning on Dry Land"	10:11
12.	"Daddy Long Legs"	4:06

== Personnel ==
Koch Marshall Trio

- Greg Koch – Lead guitar, Rhythm guitar, Vocals
- Toby Lee Marshall – Hammond Organ
- Dylan Koch – Drums
