= Plays Well with Others =

Plays Well with Others may refer to:

- Doesn't Play Well with Others, 2011 album by Lagwagon and Joey Cape
- Plays Well with Others (Greg Koch album), 2013
- Plays Well with Others (Phil Collins album), 2018 4-CD box set
