= Unrepentant (album) =

2017 album by Greg Koch

Studio album by Greg Koch
- Released: April 24, 2017
- Recorded: Colorado Sound
- Studio: Murphy's Idle Hours Cafe
- Genre: soul, Gospel, Blues, Funk
- Length: 37:23
- Label: Bear Family Records
- Producer: Chris Hanson

Unrepentant is a studio album by American guitarist Greg Koch. Released April 24, 2017 just prior to the formation of his new band Koch Marshall Trio.

== Background ==
- Click for video], Koch Marshall Trio in 2018 (Title Track: Unrepentant)

Koch released Unrepentant as a solo artist. He formed the Koch Marshall Trio and subsequently released the album Toby Arrives just months after the release of Unrepentant.

== Release and reception ==
Greg Koch assembled musicians from his previous bands to record this album including Gary Keohler and Kevin Mushel. The award winning band with two former members of "Greg Koch and the Tone Controls", a band which previously won five Wisconsin Area Music Awards for Blues Artist of the Year (1993, 1995, 1996, 1997 and 1998).

The Unrepentant album was released April 24, 2017.

The Koch Marshall Trio often plays the title track "Unrepentant" in their live performance.

== Track listing ==
All tracks are written by Greg Koch.

Unrepentant
No.	Title	Length
1.	"Wechz Grape"	7:04
2.	"Funk Force Five"	3:09
3.	"Rocky Mountain Gristle"	3:29
4.	"Sweet tea"	9:59
5.	"Goon"	4:21
6.	"Night Owl Instrumental"	4:00
7.	"Unrepentant"	5:12

== Personnel ==
Greg Koch

- Greg Koch – Lead guitar, Rhythm guitar
- Dylan Koch, Del Bennett, Andrew E, Gary Keohler – Drums
- Eric Hervey, Kevin Mushel, Gerrett Sayers - bass
- Theo Merriweather - Keyboards
- Darren Kramer - Trombones and arrangement
