= Greg Koch (musician) =

American guitarist (born 1966)

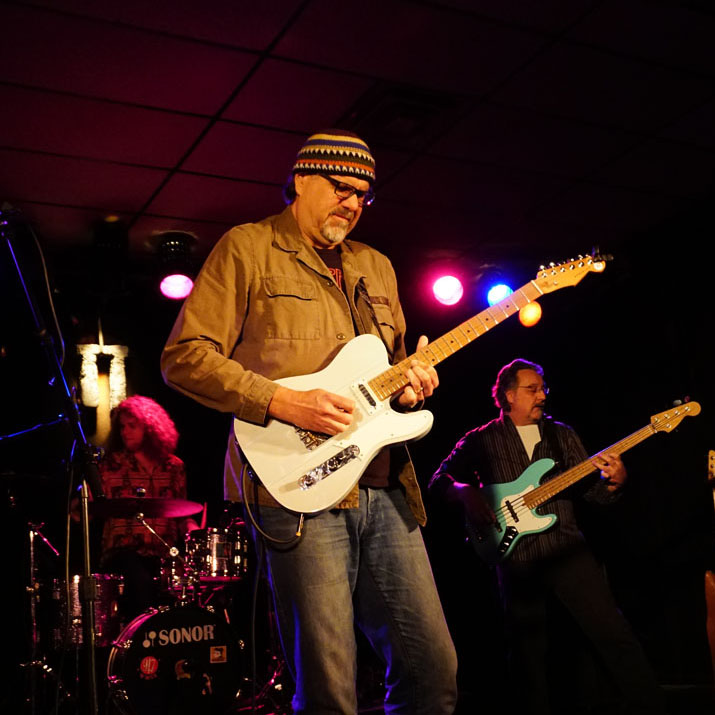
- Koch in 2019
- Born: Gregory Koch; June 23, 1966 (age 60); Milwaukee, Wisconsin, U.S.
- Education: University of Wisconsin–Stevens Point
- Spouse: Sarah Koch
- Children: 4
- Musical career
- Genres: Blues rock; blues; progressive rock; jazz
- Occupations: Guitarist, singer-songwriter
- Instruments: Guitar; Vocals
- Years active: 1978–present
- Labels: Grooveyard; Mascot Label Group; Bear Family; Favored Nations
- Website: gregkoch.com

Signature
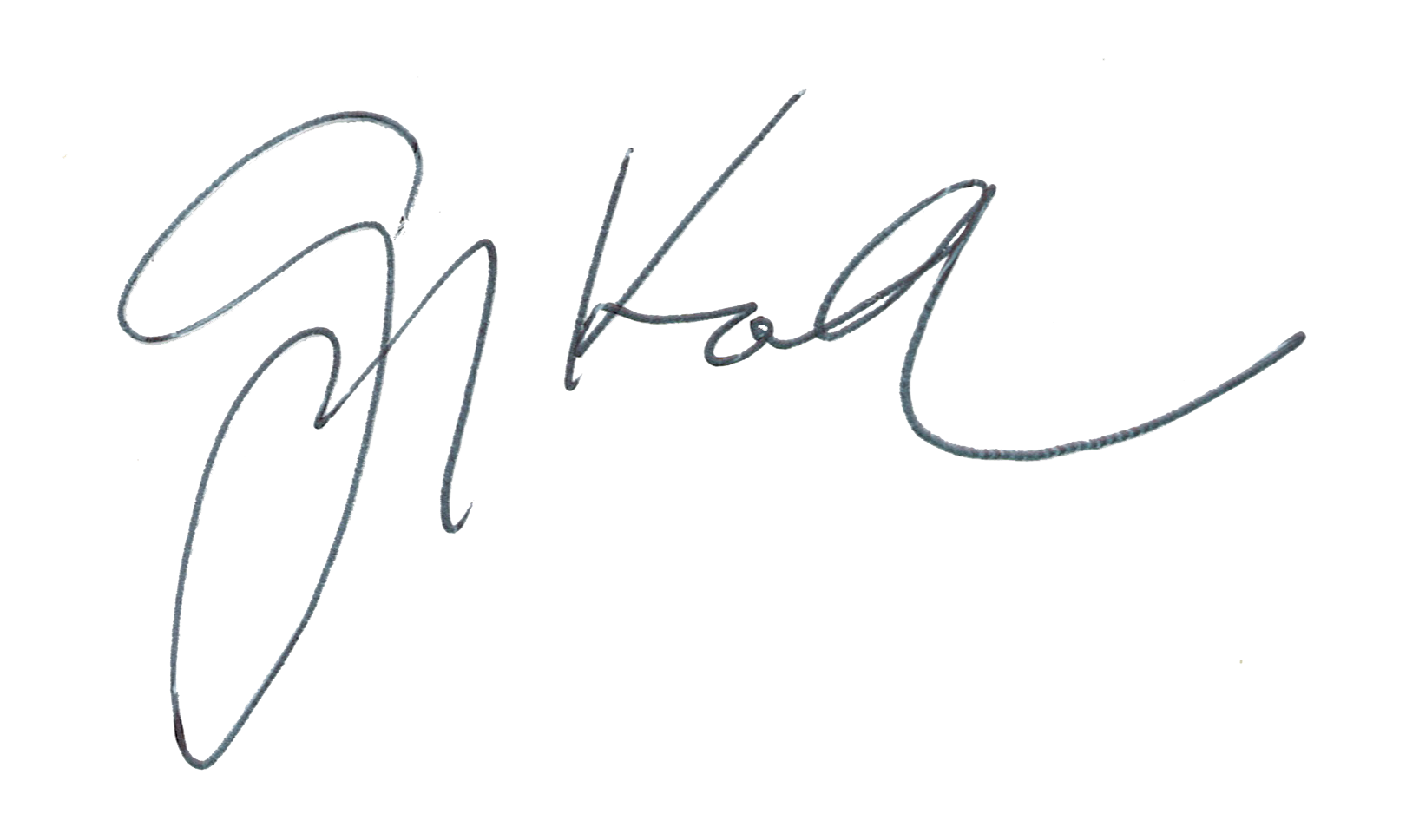

Greg Koch (born 1966) is an American guitarist from Wauwatosa, Wisconsin. In April 2012, Fender Musical Instruments Corporation named Koch one of the top 10 unsung guitarists. In April 2023, The Wisconsin Area Music Industry announced that Koch would be inducted into the WAMI Hall of Fame.

== Early life and education ==
Koch grew up in the Milwaukee area and began playing guitar at the age of 12. He was influenced by the guitarist and singer-songwriter Jimi Hendrix. Koch was the youngest of seven children. He attended college for jazz performance at the University of Wisconsin-Stevens Point.

== Career ==
Koch won first place in the 1989 Bluesbreaker Guitar Showdown judged by singer/guitar player Buddy Guy. Koch has also played with Joe Bonamassa. Greg Koch is currently a Martin Guitar clinician. In addition to playing guitar, Koch has authored many books on various guitar methods and styles. He also gives Skype guitar lessons and in 2020 Guitar World called him one of the 15 best guitar teachers.

=== Greg Koch and the Tone Controls ===
The group was formed as a trio that included guitar, bass, and drums. The original band members include journeyman drummer and vocalist Gary Koehler, bass guitar and vocals Kevin Mushel, and Koch on electric guitar and vocals. Other members of the band included John Calarco on drums and Tom Goode on bass.

Koch and the Tone Controls won five Wisconsin Area Music Awards for Blues Artist of the Year (1993, 1995, 1996, 1997, and 1998).

=== Greg Koch and Other Bad Men ===
Koch recorded a live album, Greg Koch and Other Bad Men: Live! On the Radio, with bass player Roscoe Beck, vocalist Malford Milligan and drummers John Calarco and Tom Brechtlein.

=== Koch Marshall Trio ===
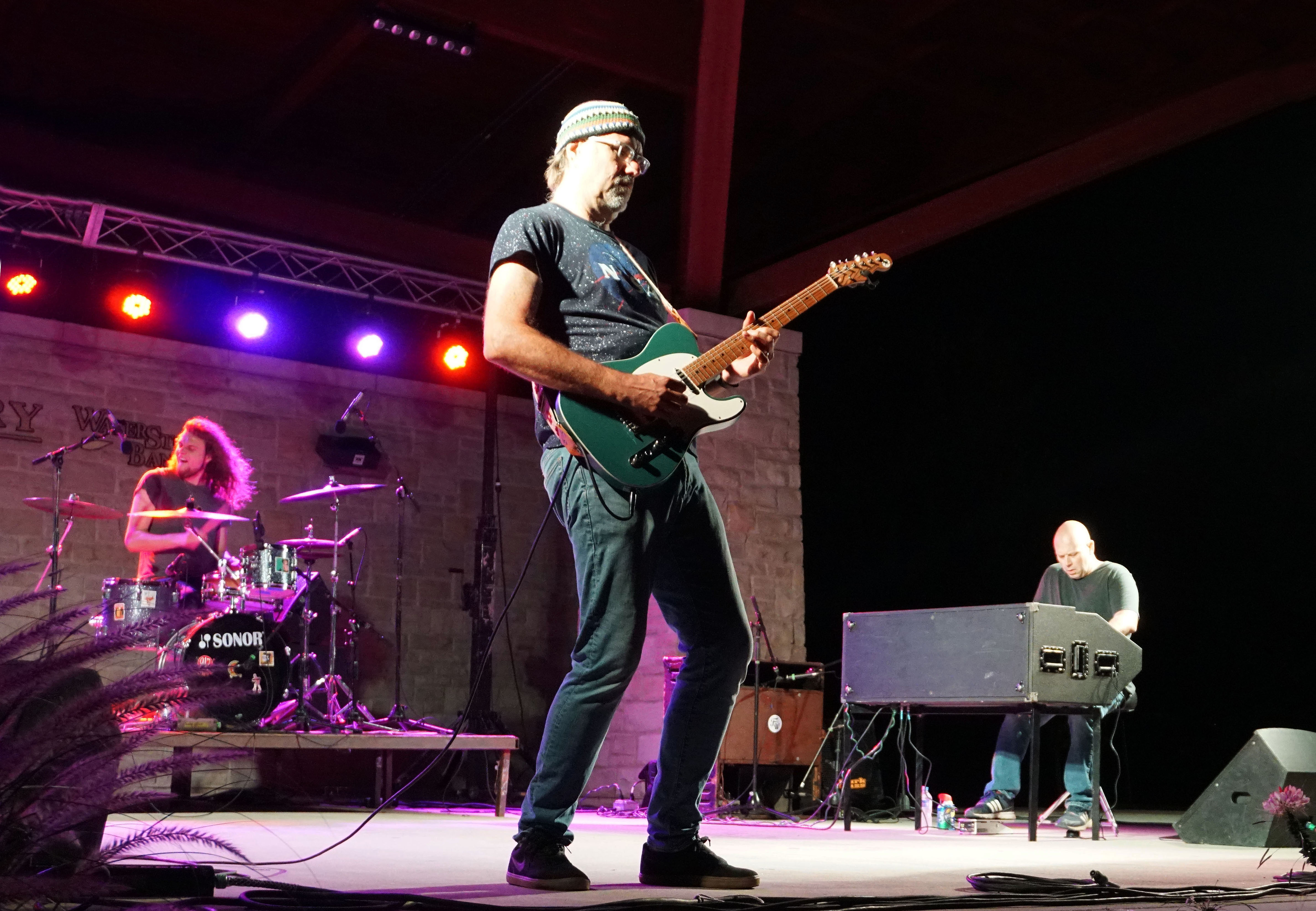
The Koch Marshall Trio playing at Tosa Fest in September 2018

The Koch Marshall Trio is an instrumental organ/guitar trio established by Koch in 2017. The Trio includes Koch's son Dylan Koch on drums, Toby Lee Marshall on Hammond organ and Greg Koch on guitar. The Koch Marshall Trio has signed a contract with the Mascot Label Group. They released their debut studio album, Toby Arrives, on February 23, 2018. Toby Arrives was submitted for a Grammy nomination 2018.

=== Solo work ===
Koch works as a clinician for Fishman and Martin. In addition, Koch has his own signature amplifier The Greg, manufactured by the Koch Amplifier company. Koch also has a signature guitar which was released in 2019 by Reverend Guitars, named the Greg Koch Signature Gristlemaster. The guitar colors were given somewhat humorous names like: Kochwork Orange, and Blucifer.

Since 2011, Koch has made monthly promotional videos for Wildwood Guitars in Colorado. He has made approximately 4000 videos which have over 50 million views. Koch released an acoustic album (Acoustic Gristle Soup) in December 2019. The 38-minute album has 14 songs. Also in 2019, Koch signed with True Grit Talent Agency.

== Legacy ==
Koch has developed his own style of chicken picking on the guitar and has taught his method, referred to as hybrid picking. Koch uses a guitar pick held with the index finger and thumb of his right hand to pick the bass notes; he uses his other three fingers to pick the treble strings.

In April 2012 Fender Musical Instruments Corporation named Koch one of the top 10 unsung guitarists.

Koch's ability on the guitar has been admired by other guitarists. When a celebration was held to honor the 100th birthday of guitar pioneer Les Paul (who died at age 94) Koch was invited to play. Joe Bonamassa and Steve Vai praised his mastery over guitar and versatility in style.

In April 2023 The Wisconsin Area Music Industry announced that Koch would be inducted into the WAMI Hall of Fame.

== Personal life ==
Koch met his wife Sarah while attending college and married her in 1993. They have four children, two boys and two girls. Their oldest son Dylan is the drummer for Koch's band, the Koch Marshall Trio.

== Musical equipment ==
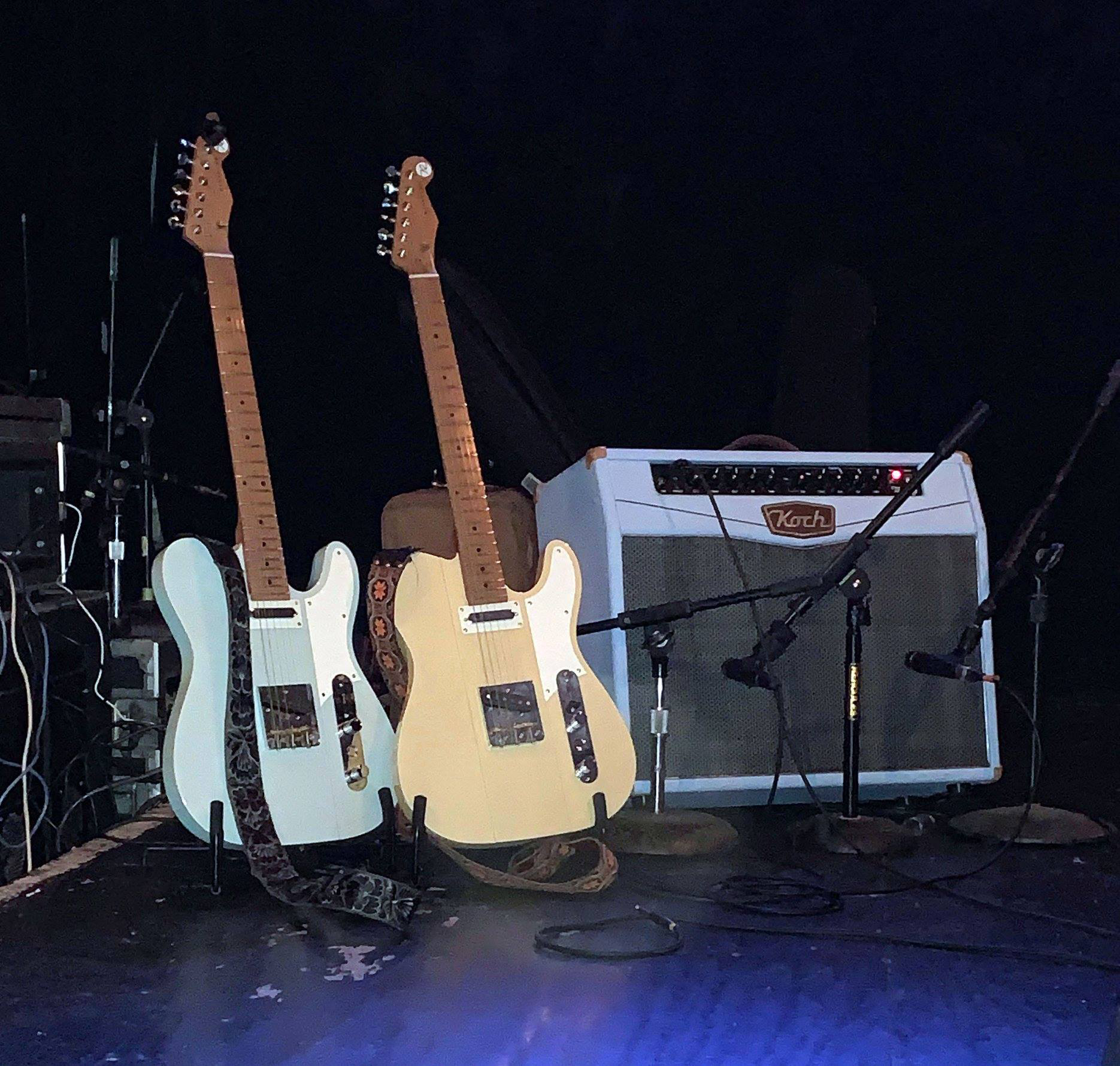
Two Reverend Gristlemaster signature Greg Koch guitars pictured with Greg Koch signature amplifier (The Greg) by Koch Amps.

=== Guitars ===
- 1953 Fender Telecaster
- Wildwood Spec #10 Fender Telecaster with Fishman Fluence pickups
- Fender Stratocaster
- Fender Custom Shop Greg Koch GSK Stratocaster
- Reverend Guitars Greg Koch Signature Gristlemaster

=== Accessories ===
- Fishman Fluence Signature Series Greg Koch Gristle-Tone™ Pickups
- T Jauernig Electronics, Greg Koch The Gristle King V3 effect pedal

=== Amplifiers ===
- Koch Amplifier signature amp "The Greg"

== Books authored by Koch ==
- Hal Leonard Guitar Method Book 1: Book/CD Pack by Will Schmid and Greg Koch, January 1995
- Hal Leonard Guitar Method - Blues Guitar by Greg Koch, January 2002
- Hal Leonard Guitar Method, Complete Edition: Books 1, 2 and 3 by Will Schmid and Greg Koch, May 2002
- Rhythm Riffs: Over 200 Riffs in All Styles Hal Leonard Guitar Method (Hal Leonard Guitar Method (Songbooks)) by Greg Koch May 2003
- Lead Licks: Over 200 Licks in All Styles Hal Leonard Guitar Method (Hal Leonard Guitar Method (Songbooks)) by Greg Koch, January 2003
- Hal Leonard Country Guitar Method (Hal Leonard Guitar Method) by Greg Koch January 2004
- Hal Leonard Guitar Method Book 2: Spanish Language Book Only (Spanish Edition) by Will Schmid and Greg Koch, December 2004
- Greg Koch Guitar Play-Along, Vol. 28 by Greg Koch, February 2005
- Hal Leonard Metodo Para Guitarra - Libro 2: Spanish Edition Book/CD Pack by Will Schmid and Greg Koch, January 2005
- Hal Leonard Guitar Method, Book 1 - Left-Handed Edition (Hal Leonard Guitar Method Books) by Greg Koch, August 2009
- Guitar Gumbo: Savory Licks, Tips & Quips for Serious Players by Greg Koch, June 2012
- Slide Guitar In Standard Tuning by Greg Koch, March 2016
- Hal Leonard Guitar Method - Book 1, Deluxe Beginner Edition: Includes Audio & Video on Discs and Online Plus Guitar Chord Poster by Will Schmid and Greg Koch, January 2016
- Guitar Clues: Operation Pentatonic by Greg Koch, 2017
- Brave New Blues Guitar: Classic Styles, Techniques & Licks Reimagined with a Modern Feel by Greg Koch, May 2018

== Discography ==
- Greg Koch and the Tone Controls (1993)
- Strat's Got Your Tongue (Greg Koch and the Tone Controls) (1995; reissued 2012)
- Double the Gristle (Greg Koch and the Tone Controls) (1997) 2-CD
- Defenestrator (1998)
- Past And Present 1993-2000 (Greg Koch and the Tone Controls) (2000)
- The Grip! (2001)
- Radio Free Gristle (2003)
- 13 X 12 (2003) 2-CD
- 4 Days in the South (2005)
- Live! On the Radio (Greg Koch and Other Bad Men) (2007)
- Nation Sack (Greg Koch and Malford Milligan) (2009)
- From the Attic (Greg Koch Trio) (2010)
- Plays Well with Others (Greg Koch Band) (2013)
- Vivid Gristle (Greg Koch and the Tone Controls) (2015)
- Unrepentant (2017)
- Toby Arrives (Koch Marshall Trio) (2018)
- Acoustic Gristle Soup (2019)
- From The Up'Nuh (Koch Marshall Trio) (2021)
- Orange Roominations (Koch Marshall Trio) (2023)
- Sweet Gristle (Koch Marshall Trio) (2023)
- Melting the Farmhouse (Koch Marshall Trio) (2024) 4-song 12" vinyl EP
- Blues (2024)

== DVDs ==
- Guitar Gristle (2004)
- Guitar Signature Licks: Blues With Greg Koch (2004)
- Guitar Licks: Lead Lines & Phrases In The Style Of 25 Great Guitarists (2009)
- Vivid Gristle Greg Koch and the Tone Controls (2015)

== Other contributions ==
- Xpensive Dogs - Xpensive Dogs/Wat Tyler [Split CD] – Greg Koch: group member, guitar (1996)
- Sigmund Snopek III - Beer – Greg Koch: guitar (1998)
- Willy Porter - Falling Forward (1999)
- Discover Wisconsin Music: Art-Of-The-State – Track 1 "Ila Rose" (2000)
- Various Artists - Where Blues Meets Rock, Vol. 5 – Track 10 "Ain't Got Problems" (2003)
- Xpensive Dogs - Dog Eat Dog (2004)
- Lisa Lauren - It Is What It Is – Greg Koch: guitar, Dobro (2004)
- Joy Jackson - To Be With You – Greg Koch: drums, engineer, mixing, producer, backing vocals (2004)
- Alaria Taylor - Unfinished Business – Greg Koch: slide guitar (2004)
- Various Artists - Favored Nations Acoustic Christmas – Track 5 "God Rest Ye Merry Gentlemen" (2004)
- Various Artists - Where Blues Meets Rock, Vol. 6. – Track 4 "Bored to Tears" (2005)
- Steve Cohen Blues Band featuring Greg Koch - Mixed Feelings (2005)
- Roger Powell - Fossil Poets – Greg Koch: bass, effects, guitar (2006)
- Lisa Lauren - Lisa Lauren Loves the Beatles – Greg Koch: guitar, Dobro (2006)
- Various Artists - Blues Power – Track 13 "Change Is Gonna Come" (2009)
- Ray Riendeau - Atmospheres – Track 4 "Alias" (2010)
- Various Artists - Pepper Shakers: Pepper Cake Label Sampler 3 – Greg Koch Trio: "Agree To Disagree" (2011)
- Various Artists - Best of Grooveyard Records, Vol. One (The Sound of Guitar Rock) – Track 15 "Foolish Mortals" (2012)
- Carmen Grillo - A Different World – Track 1 "Come and Gone" (2013)
- John Sieger - A Walk in the Park – Greg Koch: composer, featured artist (2013)
- Various Artists - Blues Essentials [Pepper Cake] Disc 2 track 7; Disc 3 track 13; Disc 5 track 6 (2014)
- Various Artists - Blues from a Smoky Bar, Vol. 2 – Greg Koch: Track 3 "Sleep Tight" (2015)
