= Dog Eared Dream =

1994 album by Willy Porter

Studio album by Willy Porter
- Released: 1994
- Recorded: Studio
- Studio: Joe's Place, Milwaukee, Wisconsin
- Genre: Pop, Folk
- Length: 46:12
- Label: Six Degrees Records
- Producer: Mike Hoffman

Willy Porter chronology
| Trees Have Soul (1991) | Dog Eared Dream (1994) | Falling Forward (1999) |

Dog Eared Dream is a studio album by American guitarist Willy Porter released in 1994

== Release and reception ==
The album was released in 1994, and then rereleased in 1995 by Private Music Records. The song that received the most attention was called, Angry Words. Porter toured nationally to support the album, opening for The Cranberries and Toad the Wet Sprocket. The album was critically acclaimed and referred to as his "breakout" album. The album launched Porter's career and introduced the world to his music which was rooted in acoustic guitar. The songs which received airplay on the radio were: Angry Words, Rita, Jesus on the Grille, and Flying.

== Track listing ==
Dog Eared Dream
| No. | Title | Writer(s) | Length |
|---|---|---|---|
| 1. | "Angry Words" | Willy Porter | 4:14 |
| 2. | "Rita" | Willy Porter | 4:01 |
| 3. | "Jesus On The Grille" | Willy Porter, Tom Pirozzoli | 4:01 |
| 4. | "Boab Tree" | Willy Porter, John Calarco | 4:24 |
| 5. | "Watercolor" | Willy Porter, Mike Rayburn | 5:22 |
| 6. | "Cool Water -" | Willy Porter, Doug Gill | 4:45 |
| 7. | "Be Here Now" | John Calarco, Steve Kleiber, Willy Porter, Bill Uranus | 2:53 |
| 8. | "Flying" | Willy Porter | 4:29 |
| 9. | "Glow" | John Calarco, Willy Porter | 4:00 |
| 10. | "Cold Wind" | Willy Porter | 5:09 |
| 11. | "Out Of The Blue" | Willy Porter | 4:26 |

== Personnel ==
Willy Porter band

- Willy Porter – guitar, Rhythm guitar, vocals
- Steve Kleiber, (bass guitar).
- John Calarco - drums
