= The Omnific =

Australian progressive instrumental trio

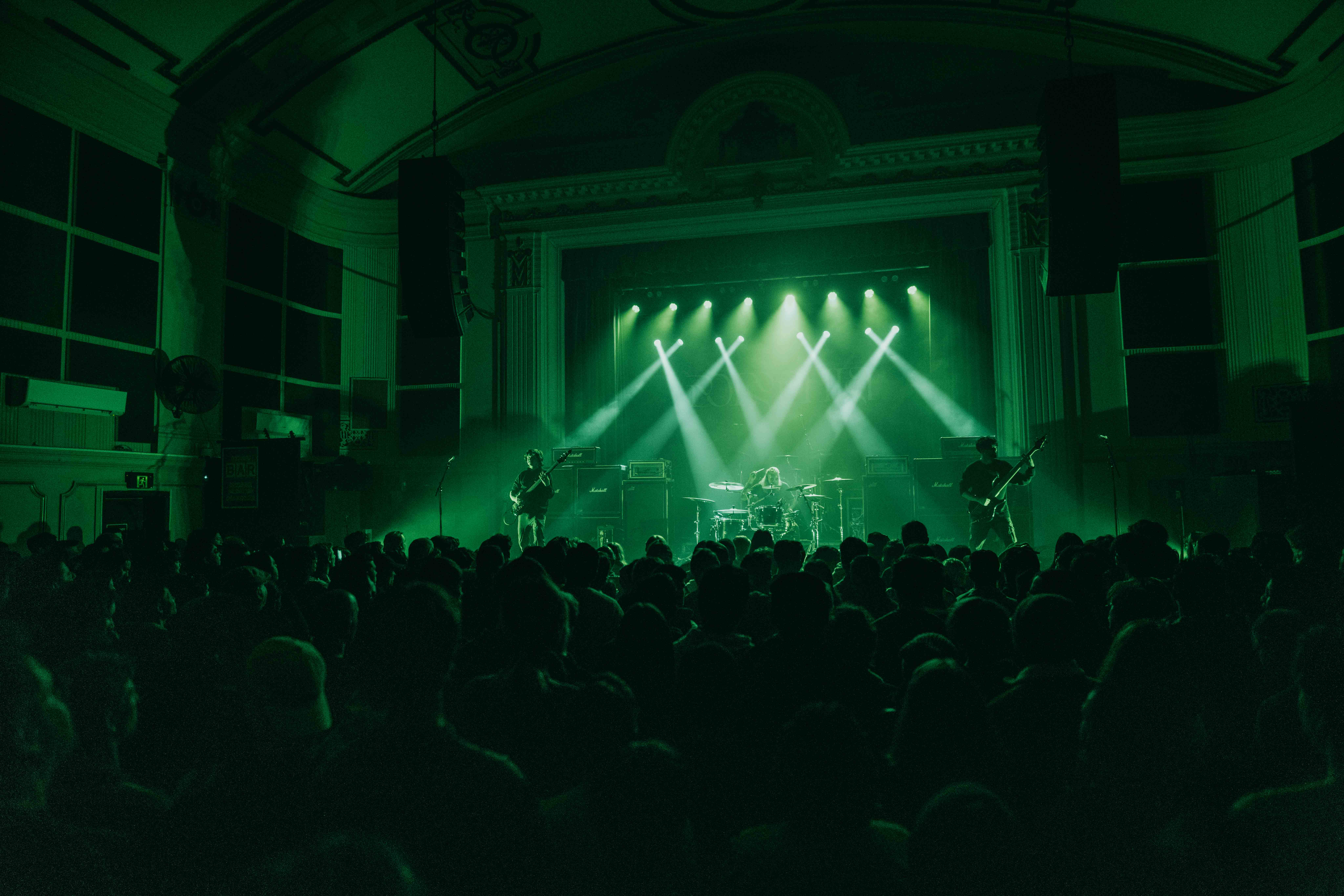
- The Omnific performing at Northcote Theatre 2023

Background information
- Origin: Melbourne, Australia
- Genres: Progressive metal, progressive rock
- Years active: 2016-present
- Label: Wild Thing Records
- Members: Matt Fackrell; Toby Peterson-Stewart; Jerome Lematua
- Website: theomnific.com

The Omnific is an Australian progressive metal band from Melbourne that formed in 2016, and is known for their unique lineup of two bassists and one drummer. The band currently consists of bassist Matt Fackrell, bassist Toby Peterson-Stewart and drummer Jerome Lematua. The Omnific have released two studio albums, three EP's and two standalone singles. The band's debut album, Escapades (2021), reached number 3 on the Australian AIR Charts.

== History ==
=== Foundation and Sonorous EP (2016) ===
The band had its initial beginnings in 2016, when Matt Fackrell and Toby-Peterson Stewart recorded a small video of an idea consisting fundamentally of only 2 bass and drums. After the video reached over 30,000 views in three days, the pair went on the write and record their debut EP, Sonorous, with their first single, "Sonorous", being released on 8 November 2016. The EP also featured a solo on the song "Pharaoh" by Plini's live bassist Simon Grove.

=== The Cuneiform Script and Kismet EP (2017) ===
The Omnific began the year with their first show on 28 January, supporting Windwaker. They had yet to be announced drummer, Jerome Lematua, play the show, with his announcement in the band coming later on 3 February.

Later in February, Matt was diagnosed with Type 1 Diabetes. The next day after getting out of hospital, Matt and Toby tracked bass for their standalone single, The Cuneiform Script, which was released later in the year on 11 June.

The band continued to play shows throughout the year, supporting the likes of Outline In Color, I Built The Sky and James Norbert Ivanyi. During this time, the band were hard at work at writing and recording their second EP, Kismet. This kicked off with the release of the first single "Objets de Vertu", on 11 October and a second single later released on 15 November "Kismet".

=== Erin and The Mind's Eye EP (2018–2019) ===
With the massive reception the band received from their last EP, the band continued quickly into 2018 opening for Ne Obliviscaris and becoming Darkglass Electronics artists.

On 5 October 2018, the band released their second standalone single, Erin. Later in November 2018, the band did their first headline tour in Australia with Osaka Punch, as a single launch tour for Erin.

The band then continued into 2019 touring with Cog. The band then did their second ever headline tour, in May, for the release of their third EP, The Mind's Eye, released 10 May 2019. This tour was also combined with Matt and Toby playing with The Song Company. Immediately after this, the band toured Europe, opening for Intervals & Sithu Aye for their first ever international tour. After returning from Europe, the band played with Galactic Empire and also played Dead of Winter Festival in Brisbane.

Matt Fackrell and Toby-Peterson Stewart also became Dingwall Guitars artists before the end of the year.

=== Pharaoh 2.0 and Escapades (2020–present) ===
On 21 February 2020, the band released their third standalone single, Pharaoh 2.0, a re-envisioned take of "Pharaoh" from their first EP, Sonorous. They followed this up shortly after with an Australian tour with Between The Buried And Me before the COVID-19 pandemic.

Throughout the rest of 2020, The Omnific wrote and recorded their debut album, Escapades, while adhering to COVID-19 restrictions put in place.

The Omnific signed with their current label, Wild Thing Records, and also with their management team, Wild Thing Music Group, in May 2021 before the start of their album campaign.

The band released a total of 5 singles in 2021 before the album was released, including "Wax & Wane", "Antecedent" featuring a solo from Polyphia bassist Clay Gober, "Scurryfunge", "Ne Plus Ultra" and "Fountainhead", with the release of Escapades coming on 8 October 2021 through their label Wild Thing Records.

The Omnific returned to the stage for the first time in over a year with their third Australian headline tour for their debut album, playing a first time sold-out hometown show as a part of the tour. The band continued on to play another Australian tour supporting Circles. For this tour, Kai den Hertog filled in on bass as Toby-Peterson Stewart had taken a break from touring.

The band continued into 2023 writing and recording for their next album currently unreleased. The band also saw the return of Toby-Peterson Stewart to touring duties with their second international tour in Europe, "Escapades Across Europe", across May and June. This tour consisted of headline shows, as well as opening for Ne Obliviscaris & Persefone. After returning from Europe, the band opened for Polyphia on their sold-out Australian tour.

On 10 January 2025, the band released a new single, Full Circle.

== Members ==
=== Current members ===
- Matt Fackrell - bass (2016–present)
- Toby Peterson-Stewart - bass (2016–present)
- Jerome Lematua - drums (2017–present)

=== Touring musicians ===
- Kai den Hertog - bass (2022, 2025)

== Discography ==
=== Studio albums ===
List of studio albums
Title	Details	Peak Chart Position
Title	Details	AUS (AIR)
Escapades	Released: 8 October 2021; Label: Wild Thing Records; Format: CD, vinyl, streaming	3
The Law of Augmenting Returns	Released: 7 June 2024; Label: Wild Thing Records; Format: CD, vinyl, streaming	3

=== Extended plays ===
List of extended plays
Title	Details
Sonorous	Released: 22 November 2016; Label: Self-released; Format: CD, streaming
Kismet	Released: 24 November 2017; Label: Self-released; Format: CD, streaming
The Mind's Eye	Released: 10 May 2019; Label: Self-released; Format: CD, streaming

=== Live Albums ===
List of live albums
Title	Details	Date of Livestream
Escapades (Deluxe Edition)	Released: 12 August 2022; Label: Wild Thing Records; Format: CD, streaming, live stream	Streamed: 8 January 2022

=== Standalone Singles ===
- The Cuneiform Script (11 June 2017, Self-released, added as a bonus track to the CD release of the EP "Sonorous" in 2017 reissue)
- Erin (5 October 2018, Self-released)
- Pharaoh 2.0 (21 February 2020, Self-released)
- Full Circle (10 January 2025, Self-released)
