= Reverend Musical Instruments =

American manufacturer of electric guitars and basses

Reverend
- Company type: Private
- Industry: Musical instruments
- Founded: 1997; 29 years ago
- Founder: Joe Naylor
- Headquarters: Toledo, Ohio, United States
- Area served: Worldwide
- Products: Electric guitars and basses
- Website: Reverendguitars.com

Reverend Musical Instruments, commonly known as Reverend Guitars, is an American manufacturer of electric guitars and basses. The company was established in 1997 in Detroit, Michigan by noted guitar and amplifier technician Joe Naylor, a graduate of the Roberto-Venn School of Luthiery. Reverend guitars are known for their combination of unorthodox construction methods, retro design, playability and affordable price.

== History ==
The original Reverend models had distinctive body shape made from non-traditional materials. Inspired by semi-hollow designs produced by Silvertone as well as the venerable Gibson ES-335, the original models were constructed using a core of solid mahogany surrounded by acoustic chambers. A strip of molded plastic provided the frame while the front and back of the guitar was constructed of phenolic laminate sheets in a variety of colors and finishes. All American-built Reverends were identical in body shape, with various models set apart by their pickup choices and tremolos.

Although Reverend guitars were initially sold in large guitar stores around the country, Joe Naylor eventually made the decision to sell all of his guitars direct through an internet website for a short time. This move was one of many major changes instituted by Naylor over the years, as Naylor tried to adapt to the changing market. A short-lived line of bass-guitars, called the Rumblefish, received excellent reviews from critics but were eventually discontinued.

In 2006, all USA Reverends were to be discontinued in favor of an imported line constructed in Korea. These guitars, known initially as the Stage King series and now known as Reverend Guitars, featured solid wood bodies and a variety of shapes. The new Reverend models have been highly regarded by players for their overall quality, affordable price, and distinctive appearance.

In 2007, Naylor announced that guitars formerly made of mahogany would in the future be made of korina (Terminalia superba, also known as African limba) wood instead. Naylor cited more consistent guitar weight and excellent resonance as the reason for the change, which came into effect with guitars over serial number 07468.

The company was bought by Ken and Penny Haas in 2010, and Joe Naylor retained his role as the designer and technical advisor. Under this arrangement, the Reverend Guitars line expanded to over 50 guitar models and more than 10 bass models. The company moved to Sylvania Township, Ohio, in 2015.

Reverend Guitars bought Joe Naylor's pickup company, Railhammer Pickups, in 2017 under the same arrangement as Reverend Guitars. Railhammer Pickups holds a patent for their design: US Patent No. D737891.

Reverend Guitars signature models have been created with several notable artists, including Billy Corgan, Reeves Gabrels, and Mike Watt.

== Models ==
Reverend has over 30 models, including 10 Signature Models. The guitars are made at Mirr Music in South Korea. Every guitar is inspected and set up at the Toledo, Ohio headquarters. Reverend uses their own custom pickups on each model. All of the guitars feature Reverend's distinctive and highly lauded Bass Contour Control (BCC), a knob allowing the player to control tone more finely than conventional bass/treble knobs (which Reverend guitars also include). The BCC allows the player to add more bass for a fuller, richer sound, or to subtract it, allowing for twangier tones that approximate those of vintage single-coil pickups.

Bolt-on neck series

- The Buckshot, features a Telecaster-style single-coil pickup at the bridge and, for added versatility in tone, a Revtron mini-humbucker pickup at the neck. The Buckshot is an extraordinarily versatile guitar noted for its ability to produce not only Telecaster-style twang, but also fuller, warmer tones, making it particularly suitable for country, rock, and punk music.
- The Charger - a retro-styled but distinctive-looking guitar suitable for country, blues, and rock, with either clean or distorted tones. The Charger 290, featuring two Reverend P90 pickups, was a Guitar Player magazine 'Editor's Pick', noted for its versatility and snappy attack. The Charger HB has two Reverend humbucker pickups.
- The Club King, a semi-hollow guitar prized particularly for rockabilly and jazz, is available in an RT model, model with two Reverend "Revtron" mini-humbucker pickups, and a 290 model, with two Reverend P90s.
- The Double Agent has a Reverend humbucker in the bridge position and P90 in the neck position, offering a unique combination of tones.
- The Flatroc has two Revtron mini-humbuckers, making it particularly suitable for rockabilly.
- The Jetstream, prized primarily by rock players for its big tone, is available in a 390 model, with three Reverend P90 pickups, and the HB model, with two Reverend humbuckers. For Reverend's tenth anniversary in 2007, a special Jetstream model was released in a sparkling silver finish.
- The Descent baritone guitar
- The Six-Gun 3 has 3 single-coil pickups, the Reverend Salnico single-coils featuring alnico 5 rod magnets, on a sleek body with a traditional tone.
- The Kingbolt is the newest Reverend Bolt-on. It has a hot-rodded body with a Wilkinson Trem. It comes with either two Special-H Zebra Humbuckers, or Joe Naylor's Railhammer pickups.
- In 2019, Reverend introduced the Trickshot—a single-cut guitar with T-style pickups.

Set-Neck Series

- The Warhawk 3 has a thicker raised center section increases body mass, while the thinner wings increase resonance. It is available in an HB or a 390 version.
- The Sensei series are all classic double-cutaway models. Each have a pair of Reverend pickups, in a choice of Humbuckers (HB), Revtrons (Reverend's mini-Humbuckers RT), Railhammers (RA), or P-90's (290).
- Reverend's vintage V-shaped guitar is called the Volcano. It has a raised center ridge for increased body mass and sustain. The Volcano comes with a pair of Special-H Zebra Humbuckers. There is also a flat, flame-maple version called the Volcano RA-FM.
- The full-sized semi-hollow in the line is the Manta Ray. It has a 1-3/4" thick body with a solid maple flat top. It comes with a pair of Humbuckers (HB) or P-90s (290).
- The Tricky Gomez is based on the Manta Ray platform, but it has mini-Humbuckers, called Revtrons, a 6-in-line headstock, and a Bigsby. The name was based on the myth of a guitar virtuoso who lived in obscurity and could never quite get his career off the ground.
- The Bayonet is Reverend's newest set-neck guitar. A modernized body design that is loaded with Railhammer pickups, a pickup designed by Joe Naylor. It comes in hardtail or with a Wilkinson Trem.

Signature Series

- Pete Anderson has a series of signature models with Reverend Guitars. The PA-1 is a large hollow-body that has been improved with the Uni-Brace system to address the feedback issue common with hollow-body guitars. It has 2 dog-eared p-90 pickups. The PA-1 RT is the same guitar, but with Reverend's proprietary Revtron mini-Humbucker pickups. The Eastsider is on a vintage-T platform that has been chambered around the neck joint. It has a compound radious (10-14) neck. The Eastsider-T has two single-coils and a push-pull phase switch, and the Eastsider-S has three single-coils and a push-pull studio switch to achieve all the pickup combinations.
- Billy Corgan has a trio of signature Reverend Guitar models. The Billy Corgan Signature is a chambered-korina solidbody fitted with a string-through hardtail bridge and a pair of Railhammer Billy Corgan Humcutters that blend P-90 snap with humbucker punch, all sculpted by Reverend’s Bass Contour control. The Billy Corgan Terz miniaturizes the formula to a 21.5-inch scale, pairing its Korina body with a roasted-maple neck and a single bridge Humcutter for tight, high-tuned chime. The newest Billy Corgan Z-One swaps Korina for alder, adds deeper cutaways, and loads hotter Railhammer Z-One Humcutters with signature etching while a master blend knob lets you sweep from crystalline cleans to molten fuzz without losing punch.
- The Reeves Gabrels Signature Model 2 is loaded with Railhammers and has many features, including a push-pull phase switch.
- The Gil Parris Signature 2 has the Humbucker-Single Coil-Humbucker pickup configuration. With the Bass Contour Control, the guitar is extremely versatile.
- Rick Vito's Signature is an Art Deco masterpiece with ebony fretboard, stairstep tuner buttons, pickup pan knob, and included two-tone tapered case. It has a Dual-Pro pickup, hot single coil with a second blade polepiece in addition to the standard screw polepieces in a standard Humbucker cover.
- The Reverend Ron Asheton Signature Model is based on Reverend's vintage v -- the Volcano. It has 3 P-90s, and features three lightning bolts in the upper horn. Since Asheton's passing in 2009, proceeds of the sale of this model go to the Ron Asheton Foundation.
- Mike Watt Wattplower is a short-scale bass guitar designed by Reverend and Watt featuring an anchor inlay at the first fret (as a tribute to Watt's band Minutemen) and a decal of a California map with a star on San Pedro on the headstock's rear.

== Artists ==
Reverend guitars have been endorsed by several high-profile musicians over the years.

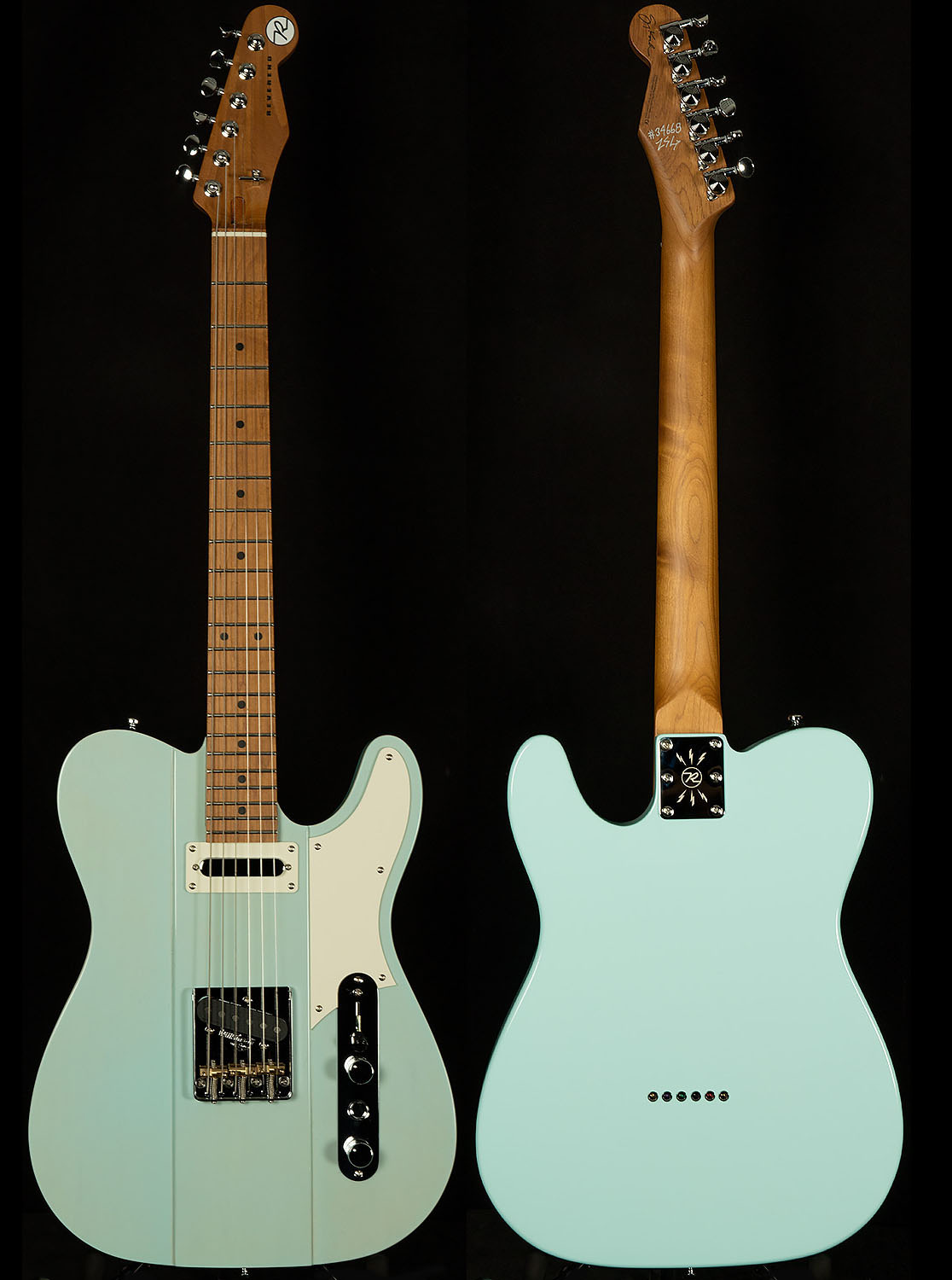
Reverend Guitars Greg Koch signature model Gristlemaster in Blucifer blue

- Kid Rock was one of the first major-label artists to be associated with Reverends, after being photographed with a Reverend for the cover of The History of Rock (2000).
- Cedric Gelin, frontman of the French band Sad and Insane, used a Charger 290 on the "Autodestructour" tour between 2014 and 2015. He will make it his main guitar on a few concerts between 2016 and 2017.
- Billy Corgan has used Reverends on studio recordings as far back as 2000 and has been seen playing Reverends during television appearances. Corgan used Reverends exclusively on the tour supporting his solo album, theFutureEmbrace. Nicole Fiorentino, former Smashing Pumpkins bassist, used Reverend basses during her time with the band (though not exclusively).
- Ron Asheton of seminal band The Stooges used Reverends on stage for current reunion shows with the group, notable for launching the career of Iggy Pop. Reverend sells a Ron Asheton signature guitar built to his specifications.
- Bassist Mike Watt plays a signature "Wattplower" bass by Reverend.
- Guitarist Rick Vito is among the Reverend Signature Model honorees.
- Jason Isbell, formerly of Drive By Truckers fame, often plays Reverend Guitars.
- Bob Balch, of Stoner Rock band Fu Manchu, Played Reverends on the recording of the two latest albums, We Must Obey and Signs of Infinite Power.
- Pete Anderson has a series of Signature Reverends, including the PA-1, the PA-1 RT, and the Eastsider.
- Guitarist for The Cure, Reeves Gabrels, has a Signature Reverend.
- Dan Auerbach owns a few Reverends.
- Bass endorsers include: Meshell Ndegeocello and Nicole Fiorentino.
- Robert "Bucket" Hingley, lead singer and guitarist of the ska band The Toasters plays a Reverend Eastsider-T and a Club King hollow body.
- Greg Koch of The Koch Marshall Trio has a new signature guitar by Reverend Guitars. The Gristlemaster.
- Jeremy Porter of Jeremy Porter and The Tucos out of Detroit, Michigan plays two Pete Anderson PA1 hollow-bodies, one tuned standard and the other to open Eb. He also owns a vintage Eastpointe 1998 Slingshot, primarily used for recording.
- Geordie Greep of Black Midi uses a Baritone Reverend Descent RA

== List of artists endorsed ==
The following list are artists that are endorsed by Reverend Guitars:

- Andy Gill (Gang Of Four)
- Mike Watt (Solo, fIREHOSE, Minutemen, Secondmen, The Stooges)
- Shade Balderose (Code Orange)
- Kyle Shutt (The Sword)
- Reeves Gabrels (The Cure, David Bowie, Tin Machine, Reeves Gabrels and His Imaginary Friends)
- Meshell Ndegeocello
- Pete Anderson
- Rick Vito (Solo, Mick Fleetwood's Blues Band, Fleetwood Mac, Bob Seger, Jackson Browne)
- Gil Parris
- Ron Asheton (The Stooges)
- Bob Balch (Fu Manchu)
- Billy Corgan (The Smashing Pumpkins)
- Jenn Wasner (Wye Oak, Flock of Dimes)
- Aden Bubeck (Miranda Lambert)
- Alex Stern (Big D and the Kids Table)
- Amit Peled (Ramzailech, Les Rhinoceros)
- Andrew Shack (Pravada)
- Andy Patalan (Sponge)
- Arthur Zubkov (Mi Gang)
- Audley Freed (Black Crows, Cry of Love, Sheryl Crow)
- Benjamin Williams (The Indigo Girls)
- Bernie Williams
- Bo Ramsey
- Bobby Calabrese (Calabrese)
- Boris Pelekh (Gogol Bordello, Hey Guy)
- Brad Houser (Edie Brickell & the New Bohemians, Critter's Buggin', The Dead Kenny G's)
- Brian Dowling (Crash The Calm)
- Brian Rivers
- Brook Graeff (Good Graeff)
- Browan Lollar (St. Paul and the Broken Bones)
- Cathy Richardson (Jefferson Starship)
- Chris Bruce (Seal)
- Chris Funk (The Decemberists)
- Chris Teti (The World is a Beautiful Place and I am no Longer Afraid to Die)
- Christofer Drew (NeverShoutNever)
- Chuck Ragan (Hot Water Music)
- Connor Holzmann (Crash The Calm)
- Curt Kirkwood (Meat Puppets)
- Dan Auerbach (The Black Keys)
- Dave Smalley (Down By Law, Dag Nasty)
- Deanna Belos (Sincere Engineer)
- Derrick Anderson (The Bangles)
- Durl Purry (Thaylo Bleu)
- Elvis Kuehn (Fidlar)
- Emily Estefan
- Emily Green (Geese)
- Gabe Simon (Kopecky)
- Gary Hooker (Brad Paisley)
- Gordon Bergholtz (Lotus, Steel Lotus, Brain Damage)
- Greg Koch of (The Koch Marshall Trio)
- Guy Fletcher (Dire Straits)
- Halston Castro (Joy)
- Hannah Rose
- J Navarro (Suicide Machines, Break Anchor, Hellmouth, J Navarro and the Traitors)
- Jackson Smith
- Jake Bonham (Dangerkids)
- Jake Woodruff (Defeater)
- Jeff Adams (Starship)
- Jeff Schroeder (The Smashing Pumpkins)
- Jermaine Jackson (The Jacksons)
- Jesse Phillips (St. Paul and the Broken Bones)
- Josh Canode (Convictions)
- Josh Childress (The Plot in You)
- Katie Harkin (Sky Larkin, Sleater-Kinney, Flock of Dimes)
- Keith Lowers (20 Dead Flower Children/Corporate Avenger)
- Kenny Lewis (Brad Paisley)
- Kevin Hornback (Reeves Gabrels and His Imaginary Friends)
- Madison Velding-VanDam (BODEGA, The Wants)
- Mark Knopfler (Dire Straits)
- Matt West (Neck Deep)
- Michael Krygier (Jessica Hernandez and the Deltas)
- Mike Bray (Tenacious D)
- Mike Poulin (Defeater)
- Mitski
- Neil Patterson (Downtown Brown)
- Pat Smith (Crash The Calm)
- Paul Cuddeford (Lisa Ronson, Holy Holy)
- Paul Langlois (The Tragically Hip)
- Richard Bennet (Mark Knopfler, Neil Diamond)
- Rob Baker (The Tragically Hip)
- Robert "Bucket" Hingley (The Toasters)
- Robin Finck (Nine Inch Nails)
- Rudy Boy (The Rudy Boy Experiment)
- Russell Javors (Billy Joel)
- Ryan Scott Graham (Speak Low, State Champs)
- Ryan Sweeney (Crash The Calm)
- Ryland Dehlers (Citizen)
- Sam Williams (Down By Law)
- Scottie Frier (The Travelin' Kine)
- Semyon Bashmakov (Mi Gang)
- Sergie Loobkoff (Samiam)
- Steve Amaral (The Nickel Slots, Red Star Memorial, Popgun)
- Thao Nguyen (Thao and the Get Down Stay Down)
- Tim "Izo" Orindgreff (The Black Eyed Peas, Fergie)
- Tim Langford (Too Slim and the Taildraggers)
- Tim Palmer (The Polyphonic Spree)
- Tito Jackson (The Jacksons)
- Tommy Koffin (Koffin Kats)
- Zach Myers (Shinedown)
- Kevin "The Dood" Doud (Inner Temple)
