= John Calarco =

American musician

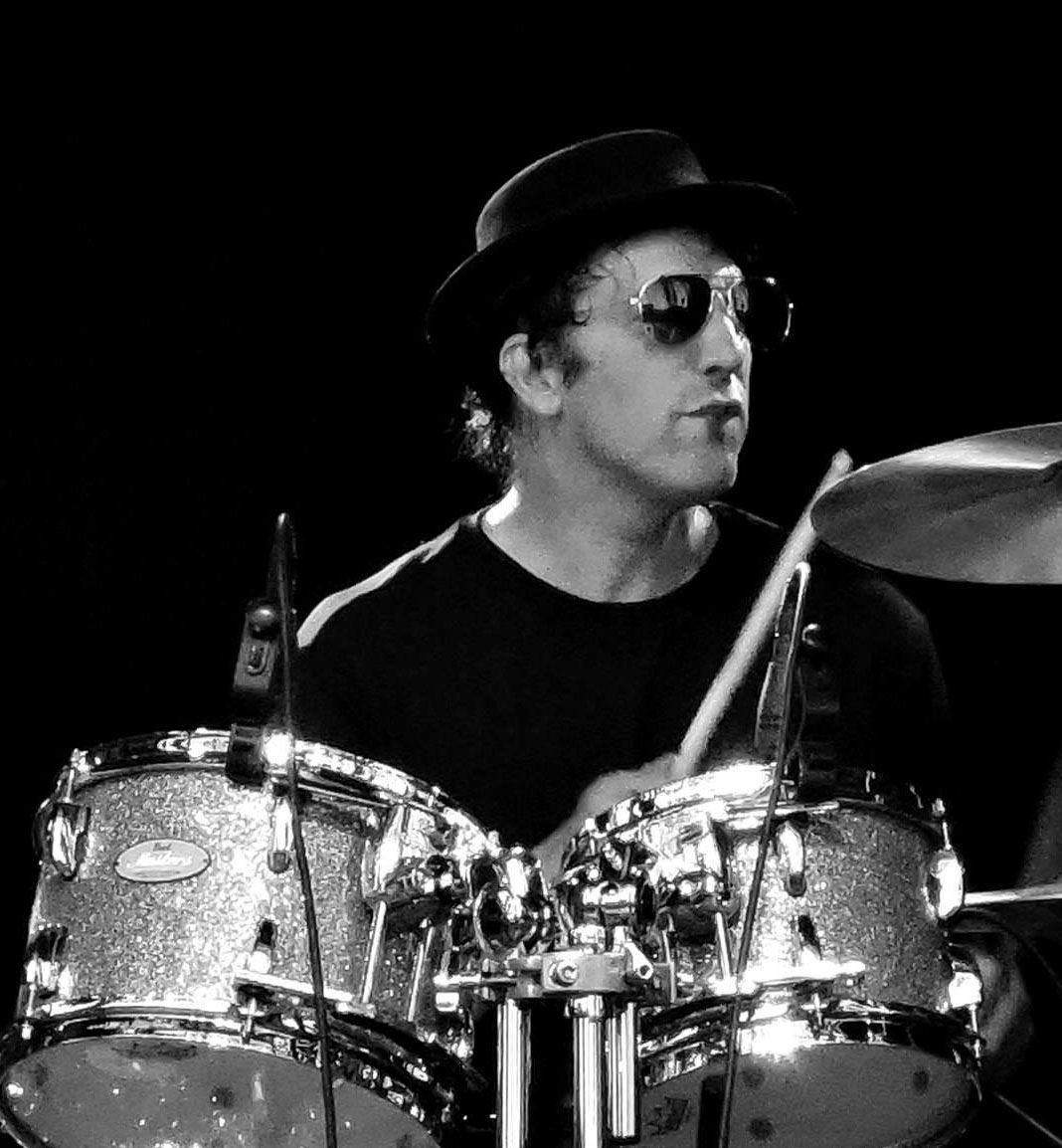
- John Calarco in 2019
- Born: John Arthur Calarco; April 26, 1966 (age 60); Milwaukee, Wisconsin
- Other name: Johnny Cee
- Musical career
- Genres: Blues; soul; R&B; blues rock; rock and roll
- Occupations: Musician, Composer
- Instruments: Drum kit, 6-string guitar, Vocalist
- Years active: 1978–present

John Calarco (Johnny Cee) (born April 26, 1966) is an American musician from Milwaukee, Wisconsin. Calarco was drummer for many Milwaukee area bands. He also co-wrote and performed in several songs on the very successful Willy Porter album Dog Eared Dream and toured with Porter as his drummer. He has made an impact as a touring performer, band member, recording artist, session musician and song writer/producer.

== Career ==
Calarco has been a drummer in many bands in the Midwestern United States. He played drums for Big Bang Theory, Tony Brown, Greg Koch and the Tone Controls and the Willy Porter Band. From 1992 to 1997 Calarco played drums with the (three piece) Willy Porter band which included Steve Kleiber, (bass guitar). The band toured the United States with The Cranberries and Toad the Wet Sprocket performing the Willy Porter album.

As a form of anger management during the COVID-19 epidemic, he wrote a sardonic song about the never ending quest to find toilet paper In Toilet Paper Hunt he sings:

"Now I stare at empty shelves
Because of people only worried about themselves
I’m just sitting pumping gas
Wonderin’ how I’m gonna wipe my ass."

Calarco moved to New York City in 1997 to play with the Blue Man Group.

== Awards ==
- 1997 WAMI (instrumentalist: Percussion)
- 2003 WAMI winner Drums/Percussionist of the Year 2003
- 2004 WAMI Drummer of the Year

== Albums ==
2002 Pure... Solo Album (as Vellocet)
2015 Shine Solo album

== Contributions ==
- 2007 Rewired: The Electric Collection Daryl Stuermer (Drums)
- 2007 Live on the Radio Greg Koch (Member of Attributed Artist, Drums)
- 2007 Drive On Mike Keane (Drums)
- 2006 Go! Daryl Stuermer (Drums)
- 2005 4 Days in the South Greg Koch (Drums, Vocals-Background)
- 2001 Waiting in the Wings Daryl Stuermer
- 1997 Double the Gristle Greg Koch (Vocals-Background)
- 1996 Sounds of the Leisure Class Records: Midwest Collection (Composer)
- 1995 Dog Eared Dream with Willy Porter (Arranger, Main Personnel, Vocals, Drums, Percussion, Composer)

== Published works ==
- Calarco, John (October 1, 2015). Hal Leonard Drumset Fills: 500 Fills * All Styles * All Levels (Paperback). Hal Leonard. ISBN 978-1480399723. ISBN 9781480399723.

== Personal ==
Calarco was born in Milwaukee, Wisconsin. He began playing drums when he was ten years old. He has two sons: Anthony and Michael.
