= Willy Porter =

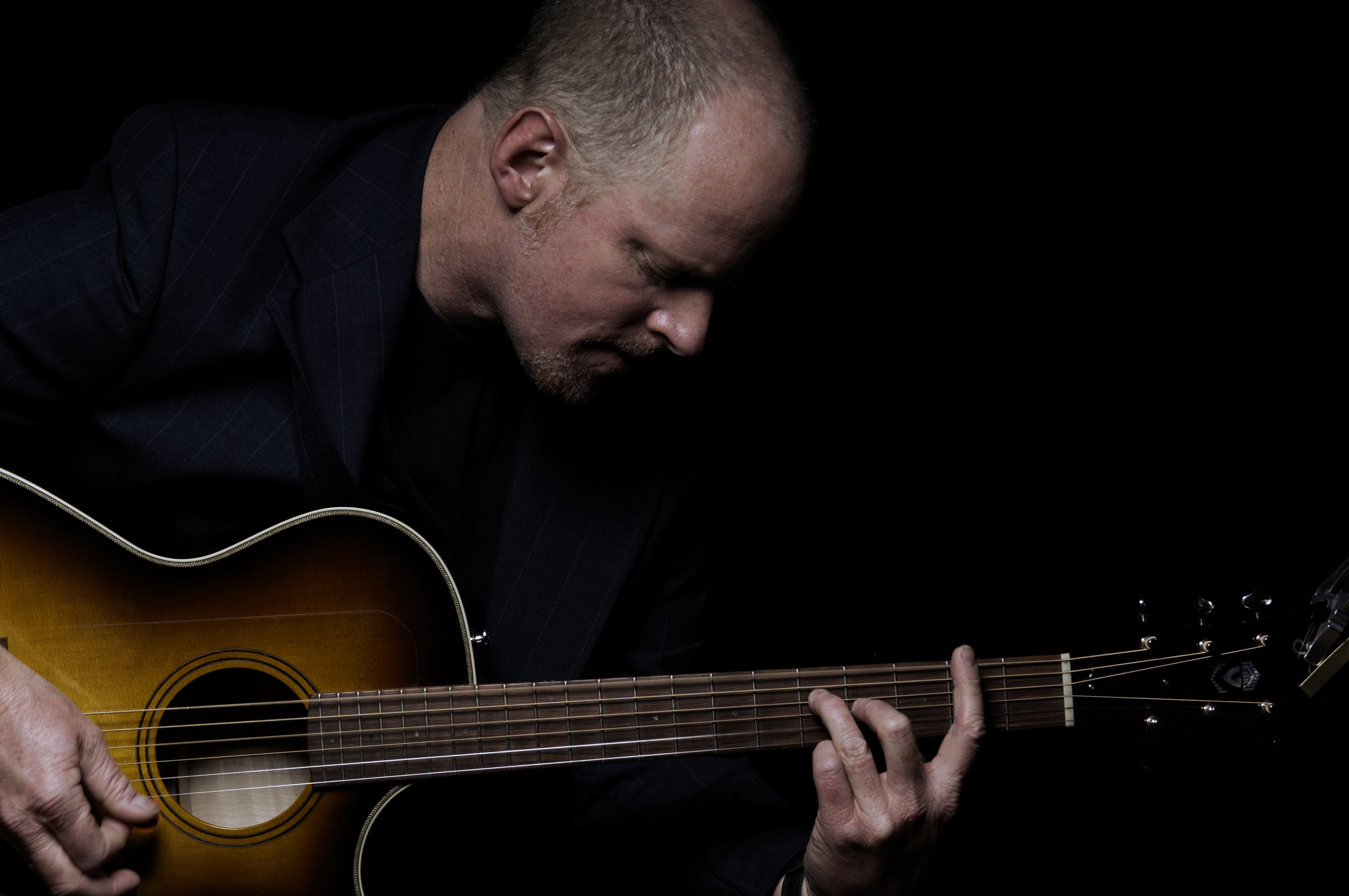
- Porter performing in 2012

Background information
- Born: October 4, 1964 (age 61); Mequon, Wisconsin; United States
- Genres: Rock, blues, Jazz
- Occupations: Musician, songwriter
- Instruments: Guitar, vocals
- Website: Official website

Willy Porter is a contemporary American rock musician and singer-songwriter from Mequon, Wisconsin. He is a graduate of the University of Wisconsin-Eau Claire. In April 2023 The Wisconsin Area Music Industry (WAMI) announced that Porter would be inducted into the WAMI Hall of Fame.

== Career ==
Porter's professional career as a musician began in 1990 with his album The Trees Have Soul with Paul Perrone. It was produced by Willy Porter, Paul Perrone & Randy Green. Much of this album was developed playing a Sunday night residency at the Club de Wash in Madison, Wisconsin. He hasn't left the road full-time since that first commercial release in 1990.

In April 2023 The Wisconsin Area Music Industry (WAMI) announced that Porter would be inducted into the WAMI Hall of Fame.

=== Willy Porter Band ===
Porter, Steve Kleiber, (bass guitar) and John Calarco (drums) formed the three piece Willy Porter band. In 1994 Porter released the album Dog-Eared Dream, which had the successful single Angry Words. The single led to the Willy Porter Band touring as an opening act for artists including Tori Amos, Rickie Lee Jones, and The Cranberries. He signed with BMG/Private Music in 1995 and in 1999 with San Francisco-based label Six Degrees Records, for whom he released three albums. During that time, he toured with Sting, Paul Simon, and Jeff Beck. This was followed by touring with Jethro Tull and its guitarist Martin Barre.

== Weasel records ==
In 2005, he formed his own imprint, Weasel Records, with his manager Chris Webb.

Porter released the disc "Available Light" in 2006 while producing the "Brand New Frame" album by guitarist/songwriter Natalia Zukerman. During the next few years Porter focused on label duties while raising a family and producing. In 2009, he returned with the band album, How to Rob a Bank. Following, his 2012 CD, Cheeseburgers & Gasoline, Porter released Human Kindness in 2014, followed by Bonfire to Ash, a collaboration with vocalist and songwriter Carmen Nickerson in November 2016, after which they toured in support of that project under the combined name, Porter Nickerson.

Porter has played with guitarist Greg Koch. Greg Koch played guitar on the 1999 Willy Porter album "Falling Forward".

== Reception ==
The Washington Post wrote that "Porter is a dazzling acoustic guitarist with a moody baritone." The Village Voice said "Porter captures the street corner ethic of acoustic performance perfectly." The Boston Globe reported that Porter is a guitarist who possesses "the Olympian speed of Leo Kottke bolstered by rootsy vocals and twisting, offbeat lyrics."

== Discography ==
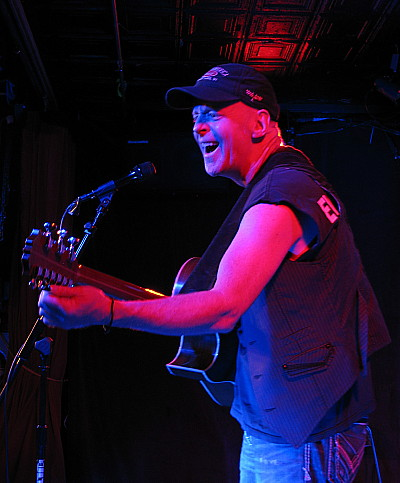
Willy Porter performing at The Saint, in Asbury Park, NJ, on July 15, 2013

- Leaving Tomah Home — 1988 (cassette)
- The Trees Have Soul — 1990 Southwind Music, re-issue 1996 Don't Records (additional track)
- Dog Eared Dream — 1994 Southwind Music, 1995 Private Music (remixed and additional track)
- Falling Forward — 1999 (Six Degrees Records)
- Willy Porter — 2002 (Six Degrees Records)
- High Wire Live — 2003 (Six Degrees Records)
- Available Light — 2006 (Weasel Records)
- How To Rob A Bank — 2009 (Weasel Records)
- Live at BoMA w/ Carpe Diem String Quartet – 2010 (Weasel Records)
- Cheeseburgers & Gasoline — 2012 (Weasel Records)
- Human Kindness — 2014 (Weasel Records)
- Bonfire to Ash — 2016 w/ Carmen Nickerson as 'Porter*Nickerson' (Weasel Records)
- mnemonic — 2019 (Weasel Records)
- The Ravine — 2023 (Weasel Records)
