= Repentance (disambiguation) =

Repentance is an act recognized in Judaism, Christianity, Islam, and other religions.

Repentance may also refer to:

- Repentance (Christianity), a specific aspect of salvation
- Repentance (Esham album), 2003
- Repentance (Lee "Scratch" Perry album), 2008
- Repentance (1922 film), a 1922 British silent drama film
- Repentance (1987 film), Georgian film directed by Tengiz Abuladze
- Repentance (2013 film), a psychological horror film
- "Repentance" (Star Trek: Voyager), the thirteenth episode broadcast of the seventh season of the TV series Star Trek: Voyager
- "Repentance" (story), an 1886 short story by Russian author Leo Tolstoy
- Repentance (song), a song by Dream Theater
- Repentance, an EP by Paramaecium
- The Binding of Isaac: Repentance, the 2021 expansion to the 2014 video game The Binding of Isaac: Rebirth
