= Plays Well with Others (Greg Koch album) =

2013 album by Greg Koch

Studio album by Greg Koch, Joe Bonamassa Robben Ford, Paul Barrère
- Released: 2013
- Recorded: Milwaukee Wisconsin
- Genre: Soul, gospel, blues, funk
- Length: 37:23
- Label: Rhymes With Chalk Music
- Producer: Greg Koch

Plays Well with Others is a 2013 studio album by American guitarist Greg Koch. Several accomplished and well known musicians performed on the album with Koch.

== Release and reception ==
The album included guitarists Joe Bonamassa, Robben Ford, and Paul Barrère. Roscoe Beck was featured on bass and Jon Cleary on piano.

== Track listing ==
All tracks are written by Greg Koch and John Sieger.

Plays Well with Others
No.	Title	Length
1.	"Simone"	7:04
2.	"Walk Before You Crawl"	3:09
3.	"Spanish Wine"	3:29
4.	"This Whole Town Has a Broken Heart"	9:59
5.	"Sho Nuff"	4:21
6.	"What You Got To Lose"	4:00
7.	"Whiskey Rainstorm"	5:12
8.	"Down the Road"	4:21
9.	"Night Owl Now"	4:00
10.	"Hey Godzilla"	5:12

== Personnel ==
Greg Koch

- Acoustic Guitar, Vocals – John Sieger
- Bass – Eric Hervey, Roscoe Beck (tracks: 2,5,6)
- Drums – Brannen Temple (tracks: 2,5,6), Dylan Koch
- Electric Guitar – Joe Bonamassa (tracks: 1), Paul Barreré* (tracks: 4,7,9,10), Robben Ford (tracks: 2,5,6)
- Electric Guitar, Slide Guitar – Greg Koch
- Organ, Electric Piano – Theo Merriweather
- Piano – Jon Cleary (tracks: 3)
