= Dingwall Designer Guitars =

Manufacturer of guitars based in Saskatoon, Saskatchewan

Dingwall Guitars
- Type: Private
- Industry: Musical instruments
- Founded: Saskatoon, Saskatchewan, Canada
- Headquarters: Canada
- Products: Stringed instruments, electronics
- Website: http://www.dingwallguitars.com

Dingwall Designer Guitars is a manufacturer of bass guitars and electric guitars based in Saskatoon, Saskatchewan, Canada. It employs the fanned-fret system started by Novax Guitars for manufacturing basses, increasing the scale length of the strings on the bass side of the guitar compared to the treble side. This design is more akin to a piano or harp, giving the bass strings length that increases the sustain.

Dingwall produces 9 different models of bass guitars: 7 of them are produced out of their main shop in Saskatoon, while the remaining 2 models are manufactured in China using North American sourced materials and set-up again in Canada. The model names of the Dingwall bass guitar line-up are the Prima Artist, Z, Lee Sklar Signature, Super J, Super P, Afterburner I, Afterburner II, D-Roc series, Combustion, and NG. The company was founded in Saskatoon, Saskatchewan, by Sheldon Dingwall in 1987, and its headquarters are still located there.

Dingwall is a privately held corporation, with Sheldon Dingwall serving as the chief executive officer (CEO).

== History ==
Sheldon Dingwall played music from a young age, starting with piano at the age of 5, drums at the age of 10, and guitar at the age of 12. He became a professional guitar player and built his first guitar in his uncle's workshop, when he couldn't find the Floyd Rose guitar he wanted to buy, and decided to build it himself instead. His uncle mentored Sheldon with notions of woodworking, metalworking and finishing, after which he built 3 guitars, which he toured with for 3 years. He modified those guitars during his tours, in his hotel rooms, after which Sheldon decided to go back to Saskatoon to start a guitar neck manufacturing business.

He got a job at a local music store, doing guitar repairs. After some time the store offered Sheldon to set up a shop in their store, first making necks, later making also bodies, and later on to entire instrument builds. In 1992, he started making bass guitars, wondering how to get a similar tone as the low strings of a piano. He discovered Ralph Novak invention of fanned frets guitars and applied it to bass which have since become Dingwall Guitar's most distinguishing feature. His Voodoo 5 string bass was unveiled at the 1993 NAMM Show.

In 1996, the entire Dingwall factory was destroyed in a fire and rebuilt at a later date.

== Instruments ==
=== Basses ===
All Dingwall bass guitars are constructed using fanned frets. This extends the scale length of the 5th string on most of their models to 37", rather than the more common 34" achieved using traditional parallel fret bass designs. They require custom bass string sets, since most 5 string sets are manufactured for a 34'' scale length. Since 2002, they are equipped with a Khaler bridge with individual units for each string.

Reviews for Dingwall basses have mostly been positive. In a review for the Afterburner series of basses, Bass Player Magazine concluded that the Afterburner was "an exceptional bass. The extra scale length clearly improves low-note focus and pitch definition, and Dingwall's uncompromising workmanship is world class". Another review for Vintage Guitar Magazine also complimented Dingwall's tone and craftsmanship in a review of the Super J bass: "Every component, from the pickups and electronics to the selection of tone woods, and the hardware, are all well-conceived and executed, and the craftsmanship is superb."

Other reviews have noted, though, that the fanned-fret design can make Dingwall basses more challenging to play. In an early review, Bass Player Magazine concluded that the fanned-fret design "isn't as difficult to play as you might think...but you will have to spend some time adapting your technique to get the most out of this innovative design". The review also noted the need for special strings to optimize the tone achieved from the basses, as the strings are longer than standard guitar strings.

=== Guitars ===
In 2010, Dingwall reintroduced electric guitars to the instrument lineup. While only a few have been produced so far, early models have been well received. The music community Harmony Central reviewed a Dingwall Custom I, stating "the look of the Dingwall Custom I is pure Rock’n Roll...the bridge pickup nails the crunchy yet warm classic rock tone with a distinct almost cello-like character.

== Models ==
=== Basses ===
- Prima Artist: The Prima Artist is Dingwall's most premium model. The body is built out of walnut on the bass side and soft figured maple on the treble side, and features a neck laminated from 5 to 7 pieces of exotic wood and dual carbon-fiber truss rods. The custom pickups have matching wood covers and a Glockenklang pre-amp.
- Z: The Z model has the same body and headstock shape to the Prima Artist's, but it's made of high density swamp ash on both bass and treble side of the body and features a 5-piece laminated maple neck. It has 2 or 3 Super-Fatty Dingwall pickups, and an optional Darkglass Tone Capsule pre-amp.
- Lee Sklar II Signature: The prominent American bassist Leland Sklar has been a Dingwall endorsing artist for over 10 years and they are his main touring basses and one of his most used recording basses. This bass model's body is built out of Northern ash on the bass side and alder on the treble side, and features a 5-piece laminated maple neck. The electronics include 2 Super-Fatty II pickups, and a modified Glockenklang 3-band pre-amp. The finish is shiny polyester.
- Super J: The Super J is Dingwall's re-design of the classic jazz-style bass in a scale 2” shorter than the Dingwall standard scale range. The Super J model body is a 2 or 3 piece alder and the neck is a 5-piece laminated maple. It has, like the Super P model, a distinctive special headstock design. This model is passive, and has 2 or 3 passive FDV pickups.
- Super P: The Super P model, like the Super J, is Dingwall's reinterpretation of the classic Precision Bass. It has a 2 or 3 piece alder body and the neck is a 5-piece laminated maple. Like the Super J model, the body is slightly thinner than the regular Dingwall bodies to reduce weight, and also features the same Super J distinctive headstock design. The electronics are an FD3 pickup in the neck position, and an FDV (and optional Super-Fatty II) in the bridge position.
- Afterburner: the Afterburner series consists of 3 models, the Afterburner I (a lightweight, passive bass with alder body and maple neck and passive FDV pickups), the Afterburner II (a semi-hollow walnut body with an exhibition grade walnut top, maple neck and passive FDV pickups), and the ABZ (the lightest bass among all Dingwall models, with a satin finished swamp ash body, maple neck and wenge fretboard, featuring also passive FDV pickups).
- D-Roc (formerly D-Bird): Dingwall's reinterpretation of the classic Gibson Thunderbird body shape is made of Fijian Mahogany with a wenge neck and fingerboard. The electronics feature 3 passive FD3n pickups. The D-Bird sports its own unique headstock design.
- Combustion: Dingwall ships North American parts to be further processed and assembled in China, making the Combustion and the NG models the lowest priced models in the company's portfolio. Final setup and inspection is done in the Dingwall facilities in Canada, and feature a swamp ash body, 5-piece maple necks and fingerboard, FD-3N pickups and an EMG 3-band pre-amp.
- NG: Adam "Nolly" Getgood Signature range, also assembled in China. It is based on the Combustion design, but it has an alder body, maple neck and fretboard and a custom Darkglass Tone Capsule pre-amp. It also features a carbon fiber print pickguard and racing/tuner inspired finishes.

== Endorsing Artists ==
- Leland Sklar
- Adam "Nolly" Getgood (from American progressive metal band Periphery)
- Earl Pereira
- Jacob Umansky (from Canadian progressive metal band Intervals)
- Kyle Konkiel (from American heavy metal supergroup Bad Wolves)
- Gary Lalonde (from Canadian hard rock band Honeymoon Suite)
- Lisa Dodd
- Toby Peterson-Stewart & Matt Fackrell (from Australian progressive metal band The Omnific)
- Chris Sorenson (from American rock band Saosin)
- John Taylor (from Duran Duran)
- Mike Sorensen (from American progressive jam band JAWA)

=== Gallery of several Dingwall endorsed artists ===
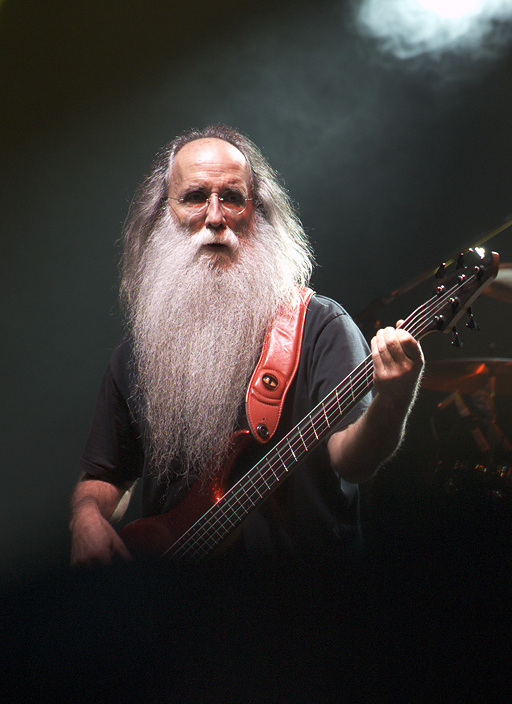
Leland Sklar.

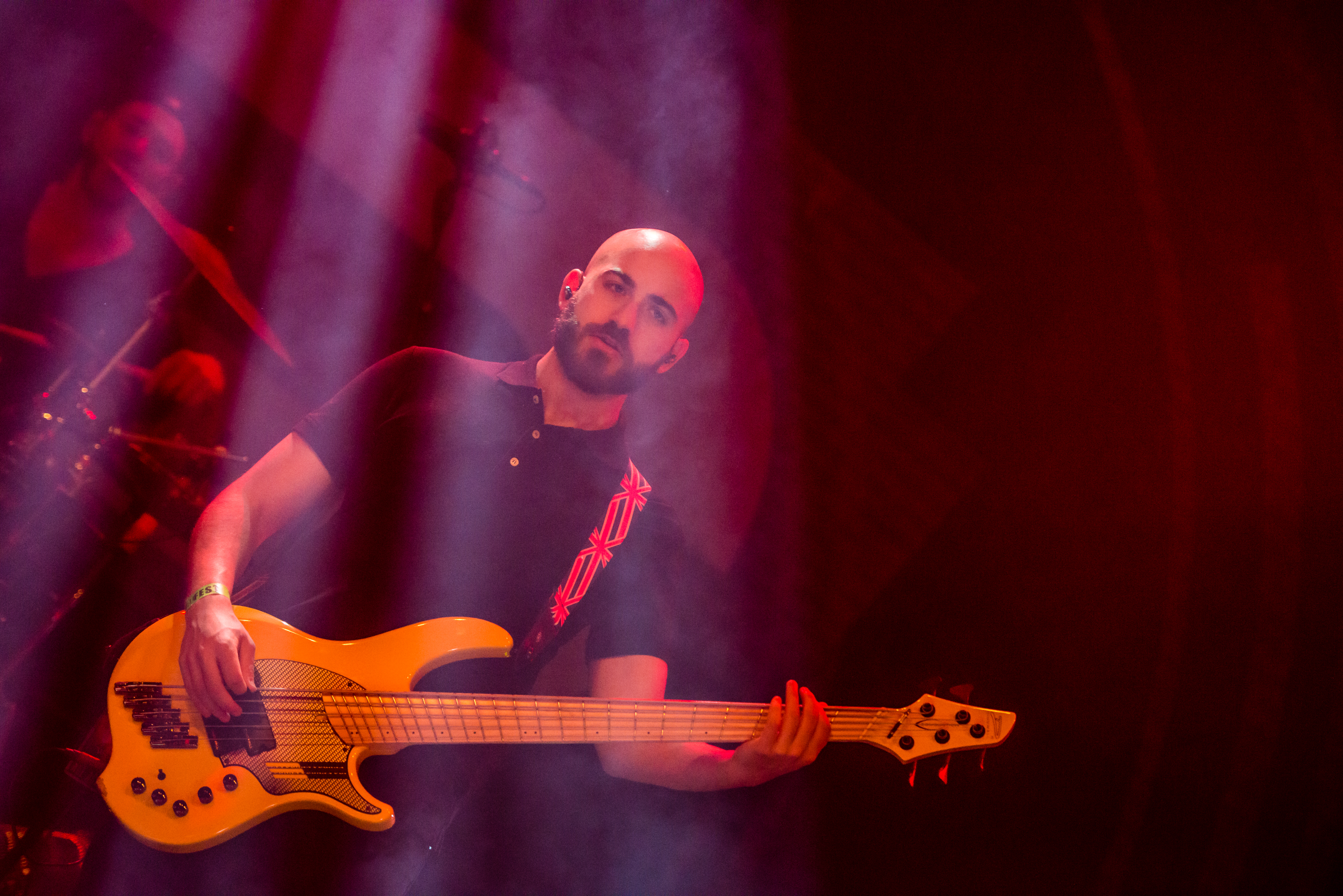
Adam Nolly Getgood from Periphery.

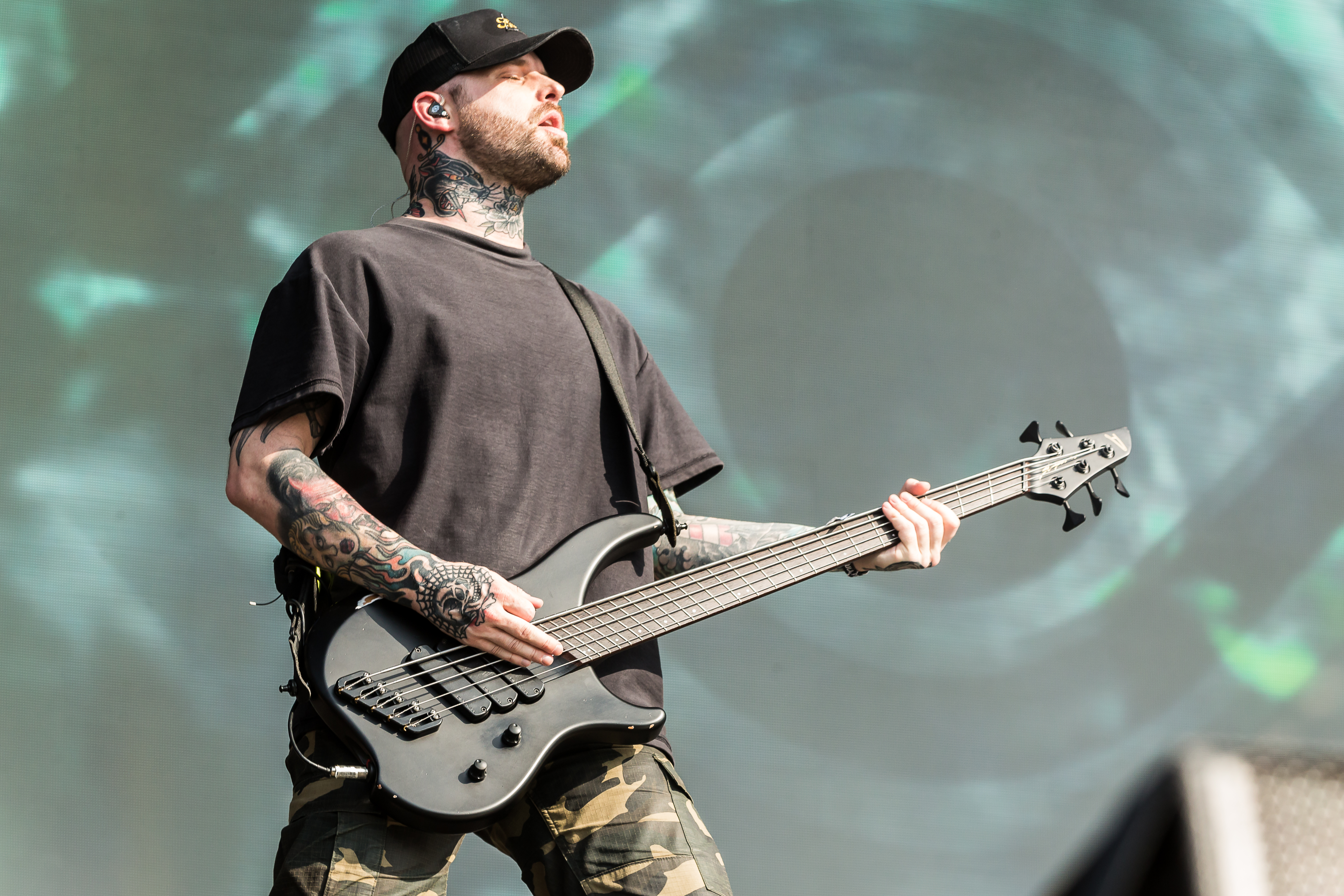
Josh Gilbert from Spiritbox and ex-As I Lay Dying.

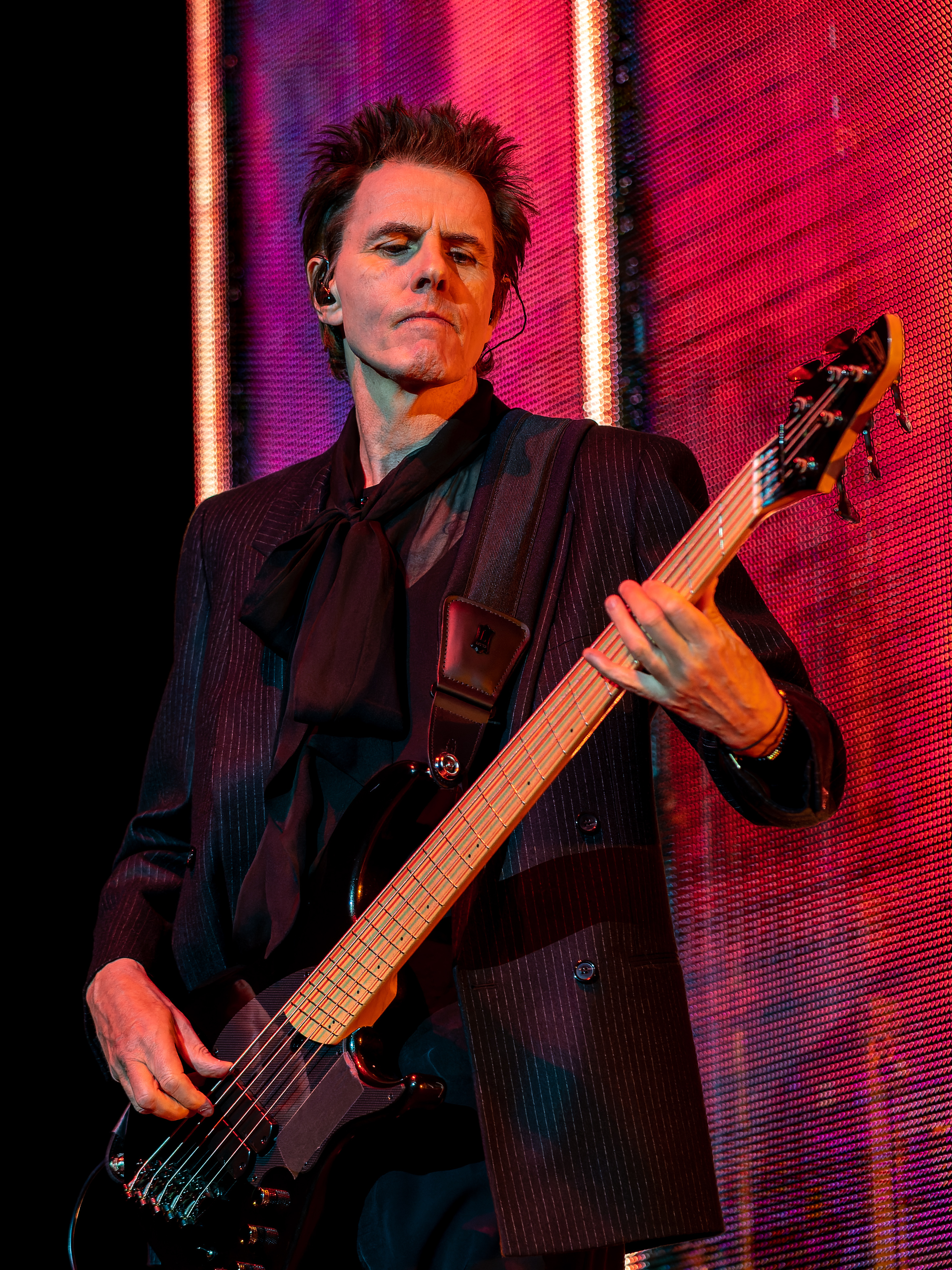
John Taylor.

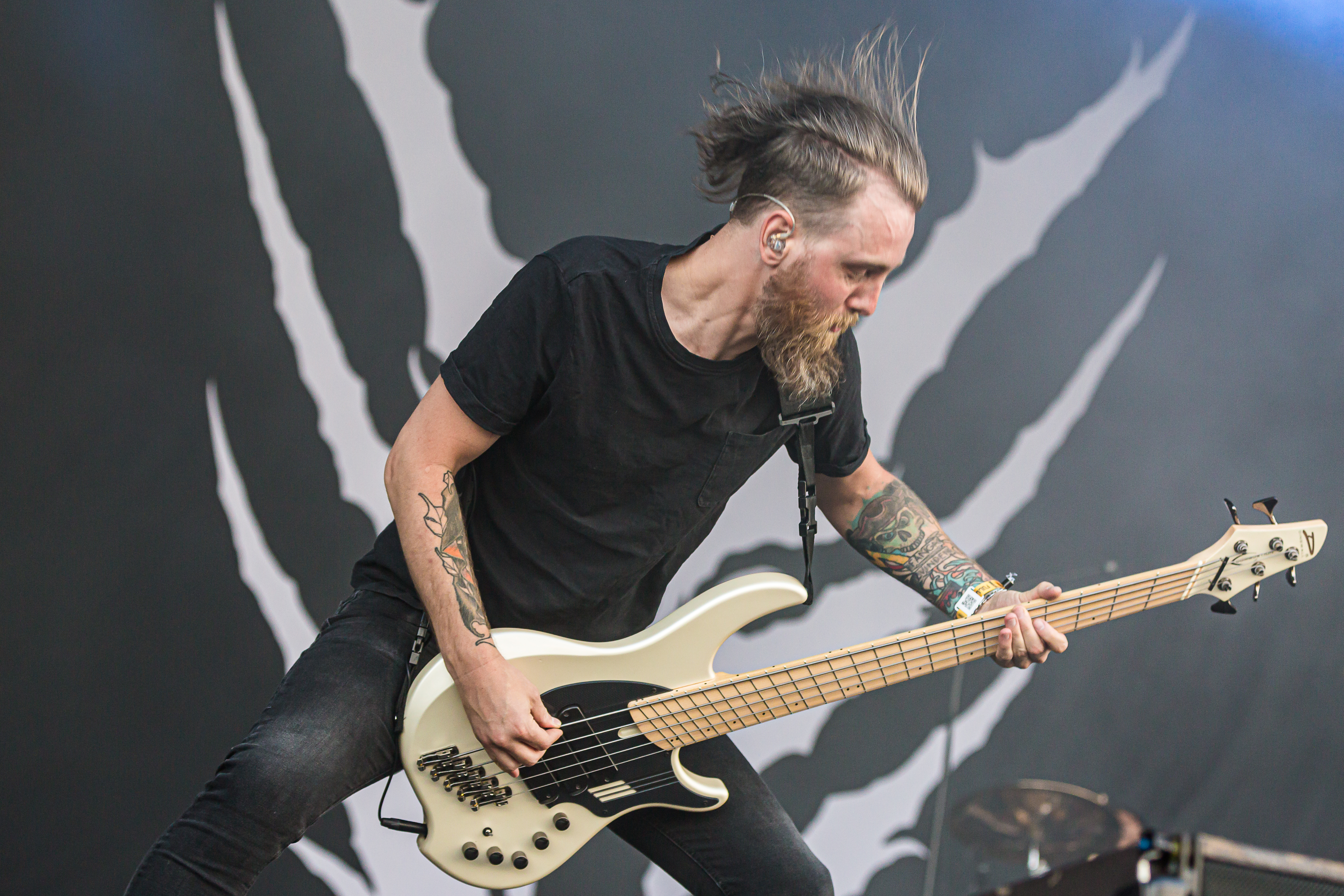
Fredrik Lennartsson from Orbit Culture.

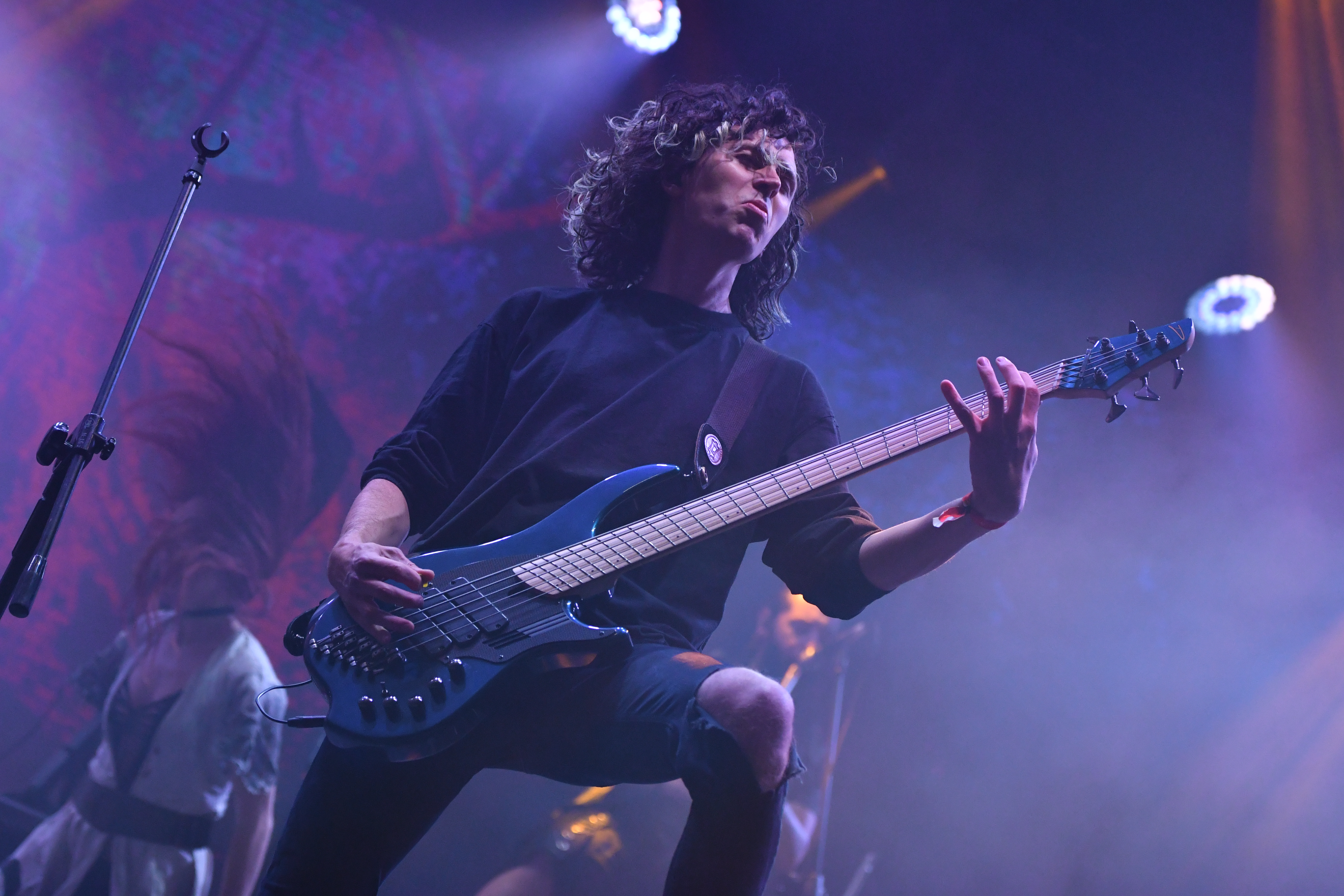
Kay Brem from Eluveitie.

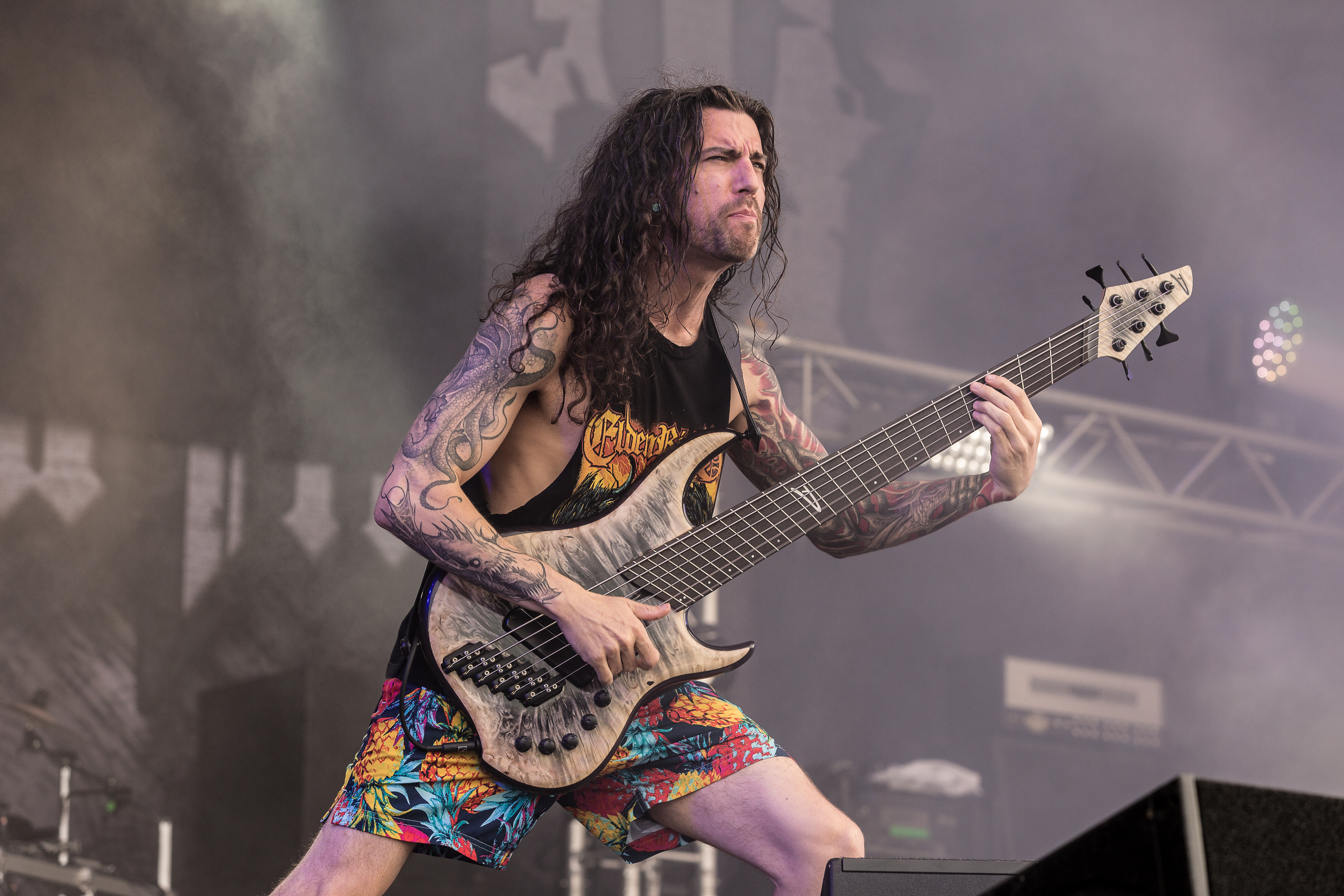
Jared Smith from Archspire.

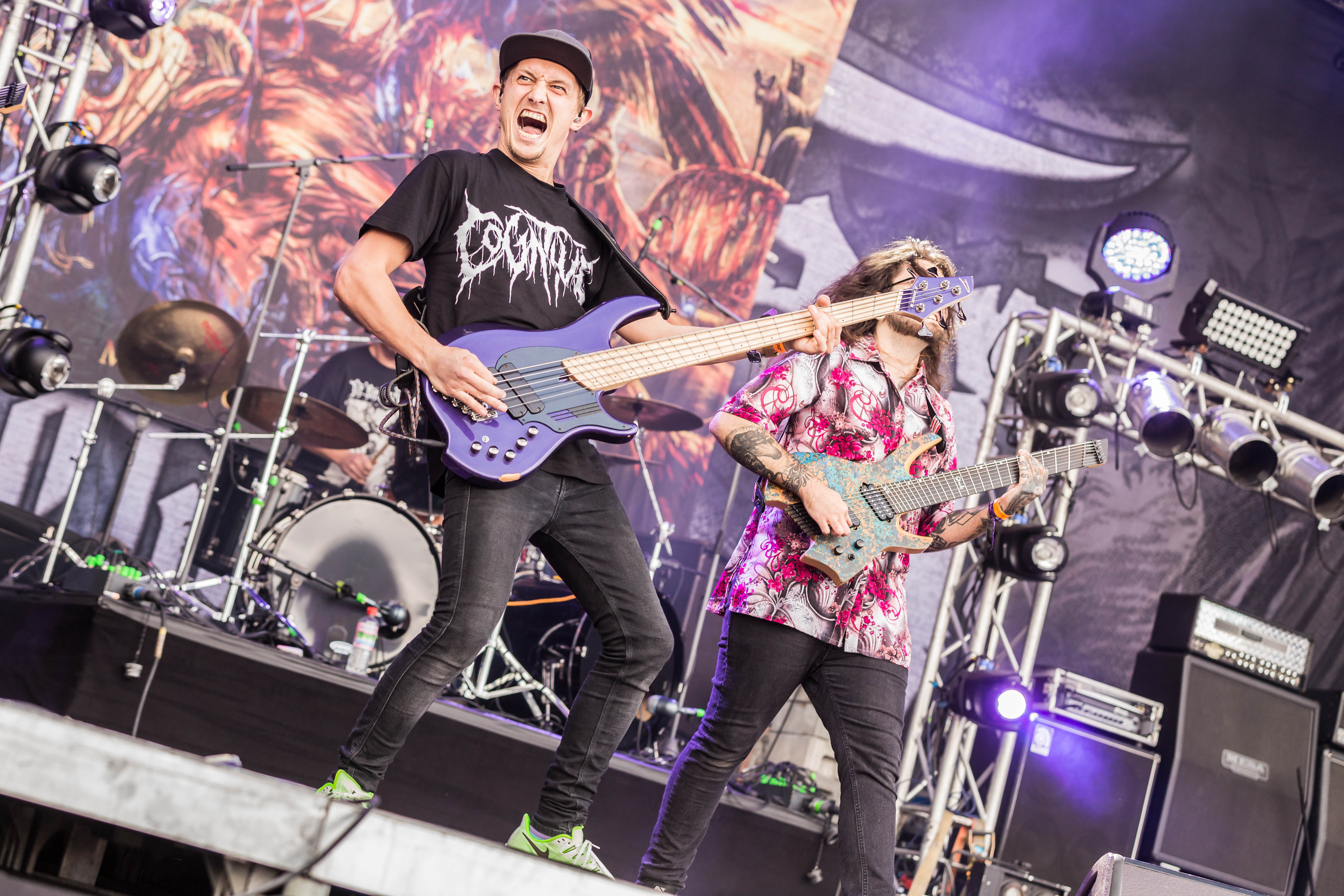
Chris van der Walt from Vulvodynia.

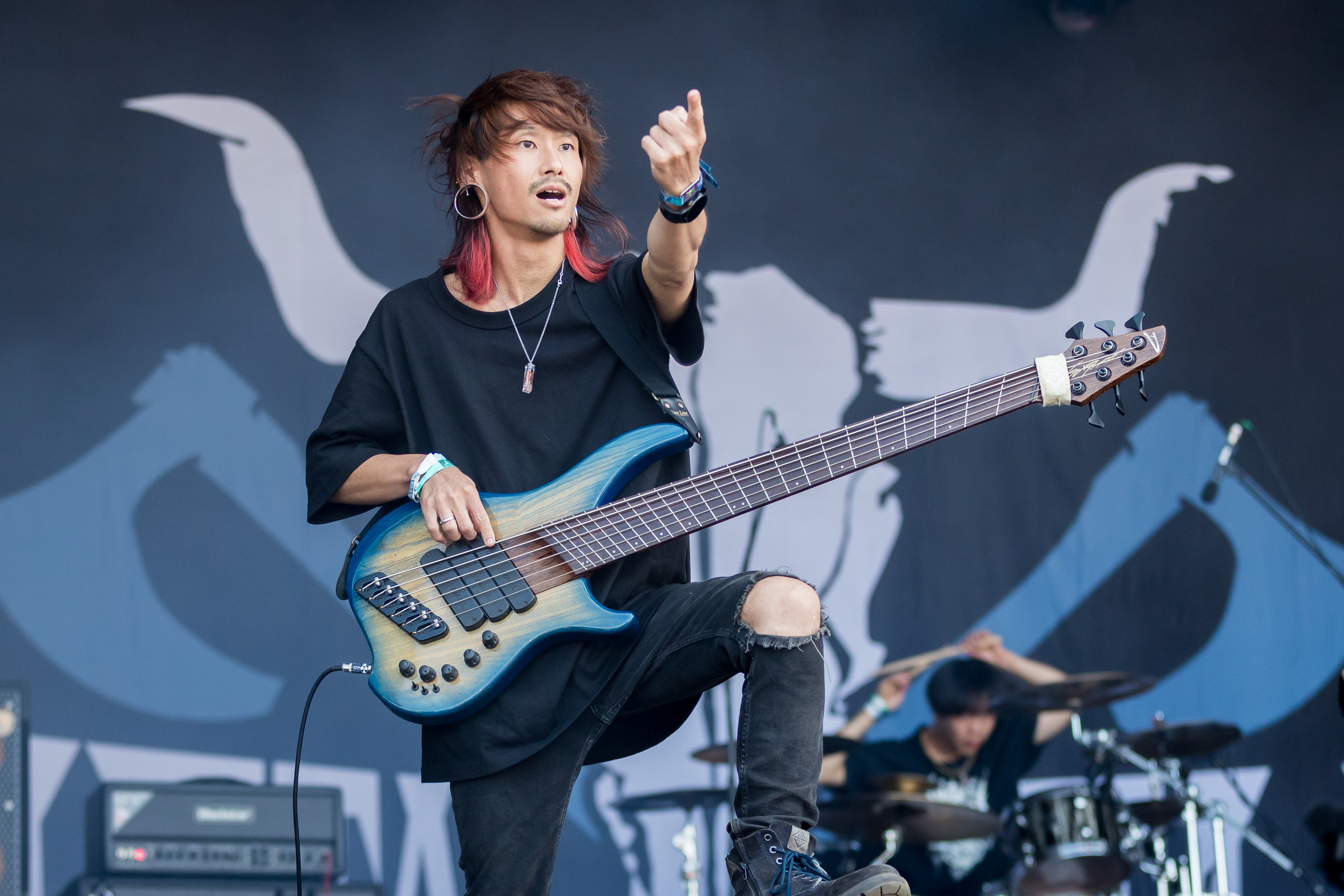
Futa from Paramena.

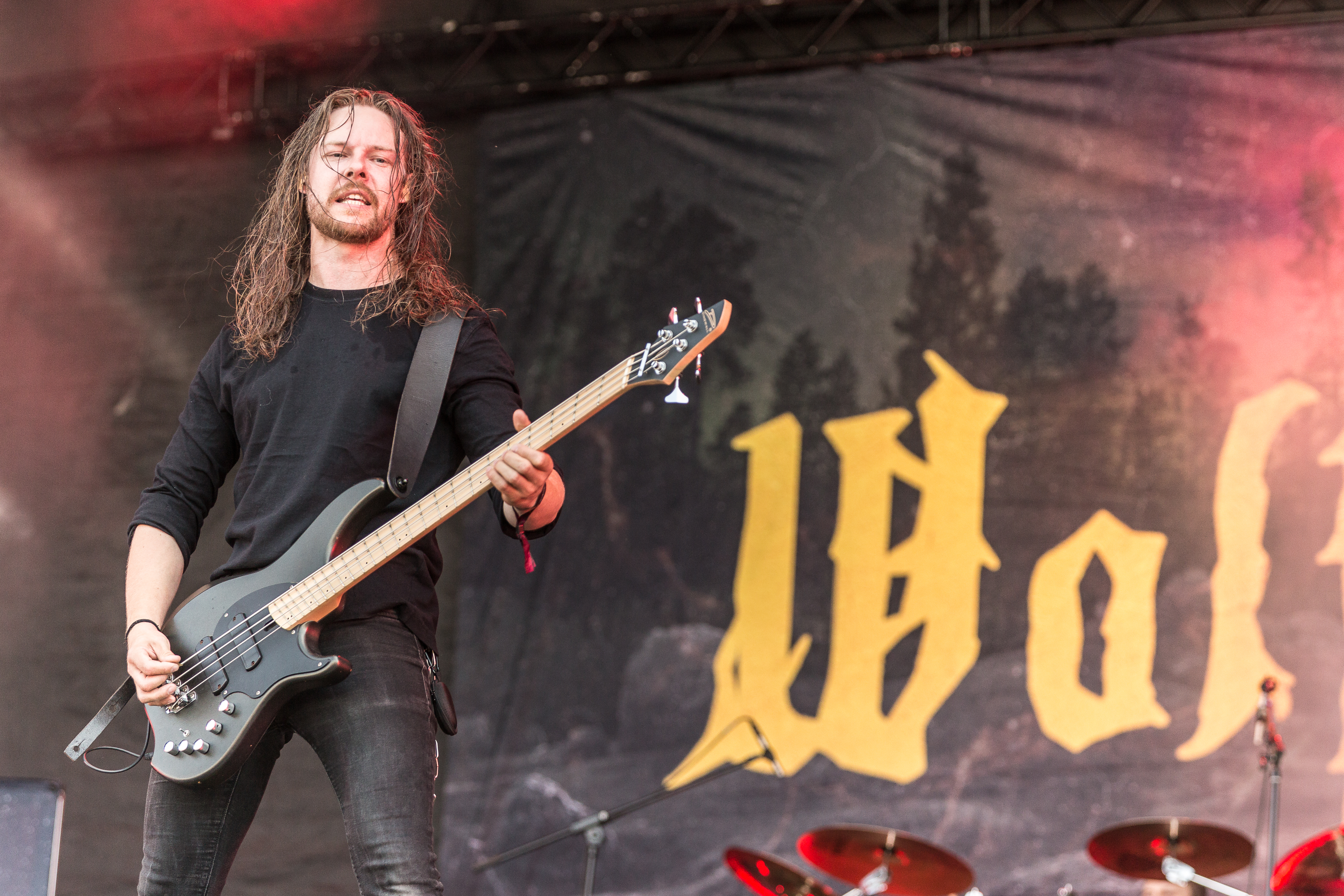
Lauri Silvonen from Wolfheart.
