= Koch Marshall Trio =

American instrumental three piece band

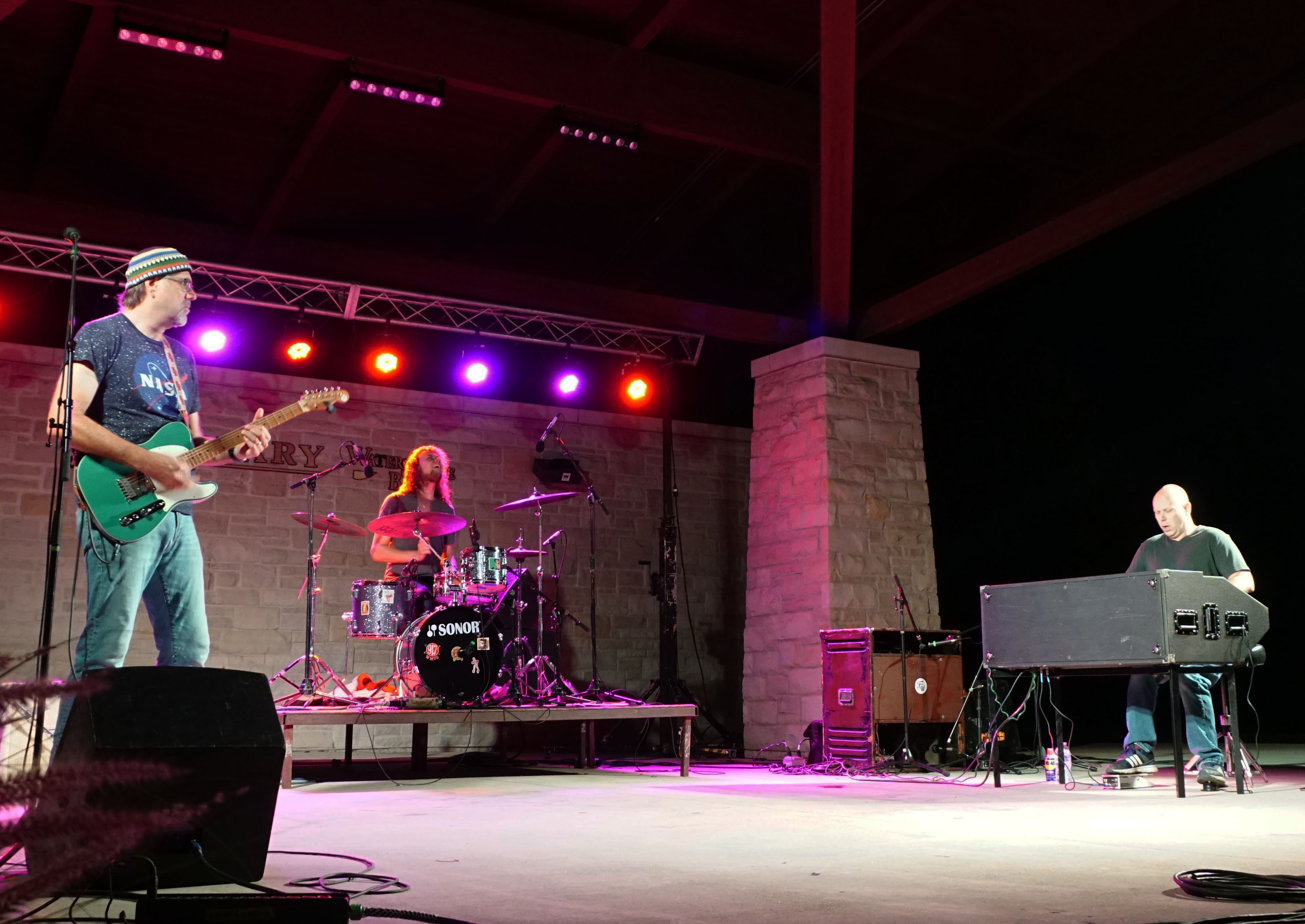
- from left: Greg Koch, Dylan Koch, Toby Lee Marshall

Background information
- Origin: Wauwatosa, Wisconsin
- Genres: Hard rock; blues rock; jazz; heavy metal; gospel
- Years active: 2017-Present
- Label: Mascot Label Group
- Members: Greg Koch; Dylan Koch; Toby Lee Marshall
- Website: gregkoch.com

Koch Marshall Trio is a three piece band which formed in 2017 in Wauwatosa, Wisconsin. The band consists of a guitar player, a drummer and a B3 organ player. The guitar player is Greg Koch who grew up in the Milwaukee area of Wisconsin. The drummer in the band is Dylan Koch. The B3 organ player is Toby Lee Marshall, from Minneapolis, Minnesota.

== Formation and early history (2017-2018) ==
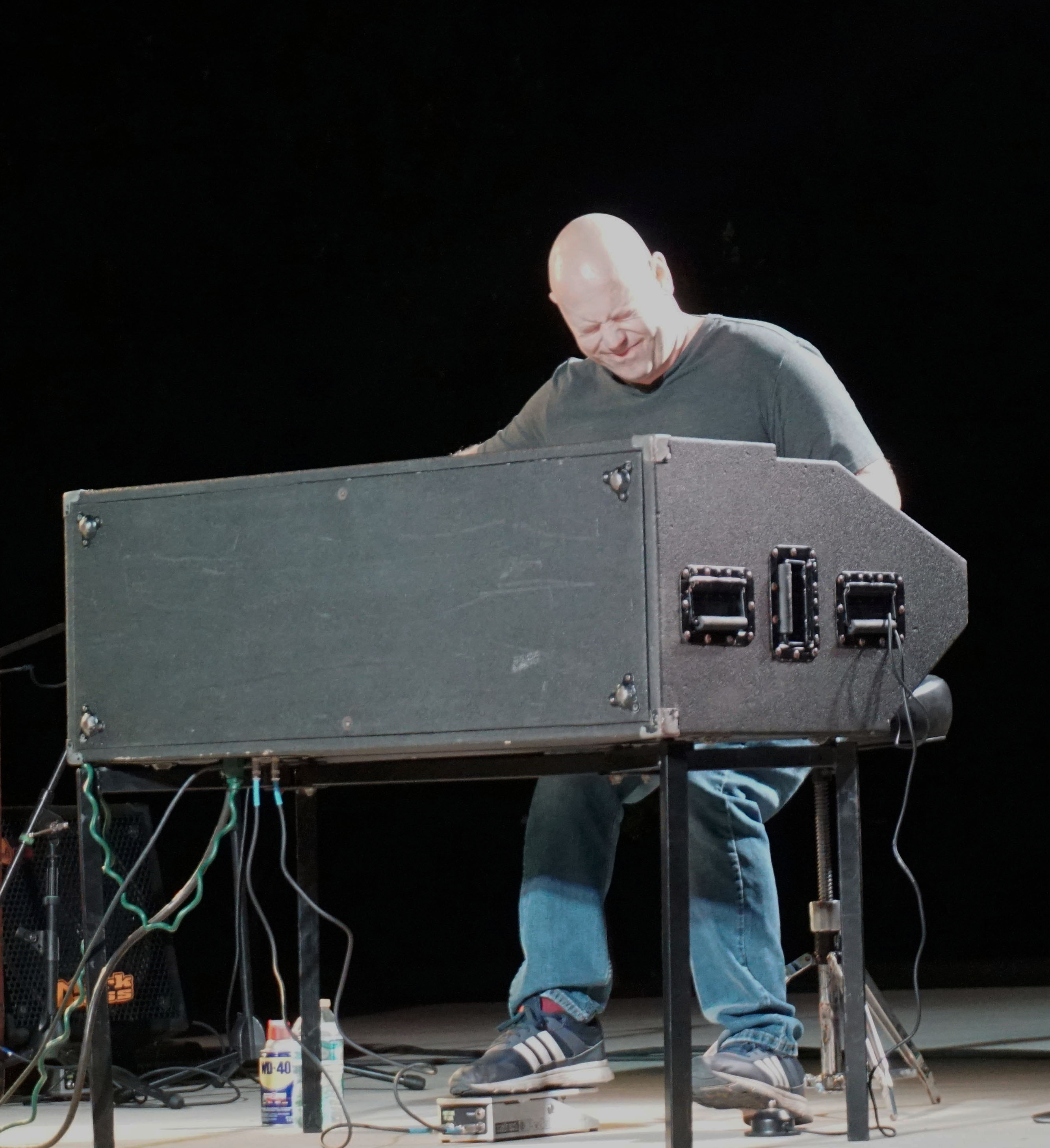
Toby Lee Marshall Sept. 8, 2018

The Koch Marshall Trio formed because of the persistence of drummer Dylan Koch. The band members were all schooled in jazz and blues: the jazz background allows each member to be comfortable with the improvisation which is evident in their live performance.

Greg Koch said the band came together when his son Dylan Koch convinced him to meet Toby Lee Marshall one afternoon. The three musicians got together to play at a local recording studio. The three players all felt like they had a connection.

The Koch Marshall Trio is an instrumental group: Greg Koch established the organ/guitar/drums trio in 2017 which includes Greg Koch's son Dylan Koch on drums, Toby Lee Marshall on the B3 organ, and of course Greg Koch on the guitar. The Koch Marshall Trio has signed a contract with the Mascot Label Group. They released their debut studio album on February 23, 2018 (Toby Arrives) under Mascot's 'The Players Club' label.

== Style and legacy ==
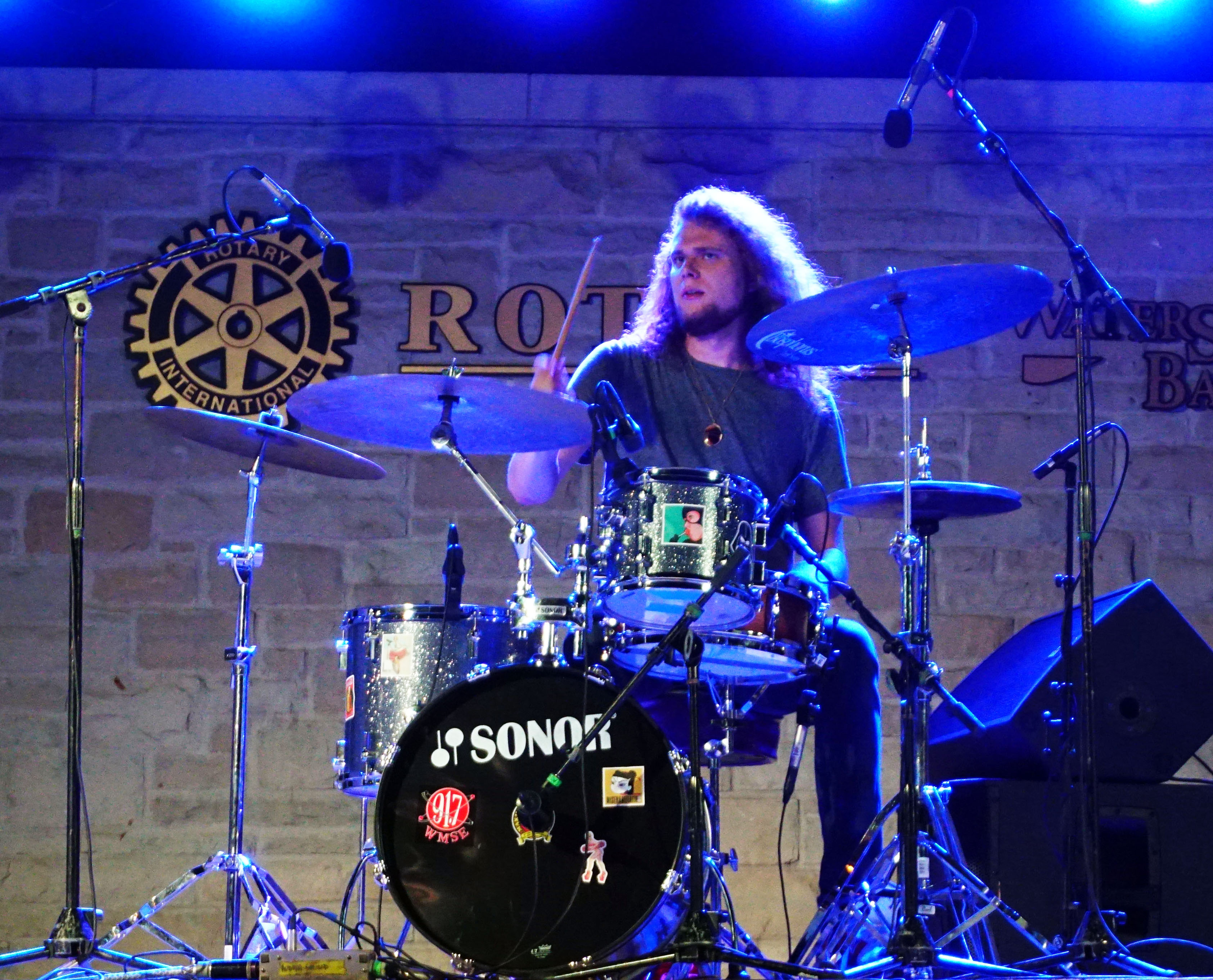
Dylan Koch on drums September 8, 2018

The Koch Marshall Trio's debut album Toby Arrives contains songs that, "morph into an amazing new relationship with organ influenced Blues Rock."

== Discography ==
- Toby Arrives (2018)
- From The Up'Nuh (2021)
- Orange Roominations (2023)
- Sweet Gristle (2023)
- Melting the Farmhouse (2024) 4-song 12" EP
