= Toby Arrives =

2018 album by Koch Marshall Trio

Studio album by Koch Marshall Trio
- Released: February 23, 2018
- Recorded: Milwaukee, Wisconsin
- Studio: Makin' Sausage Music & Murphy's Idle Hours Cafe
- Genre: Soul, gospel, blues, funk
- Length: 50:08
- Label: Mascot Label Group
- Producer: Steve Hamilton & Chris Hanson

Toby arrives is the debut studio album by American instrumental band Koch Marshall Trio. Released on February 23, 2018, the album has received praise from many reviewers.

== Background ==
The Toby Arrives album title is in reference to the Hammond organ player Toby Lee Marshall. Dylan Koch insisted that Greg Koch play with Marshall. The three musicians got together to play at a local studio that had a B3 organ. During their very first time performing together, the three of them wrote the title track to Toby Arrives.

== Release and reception ==
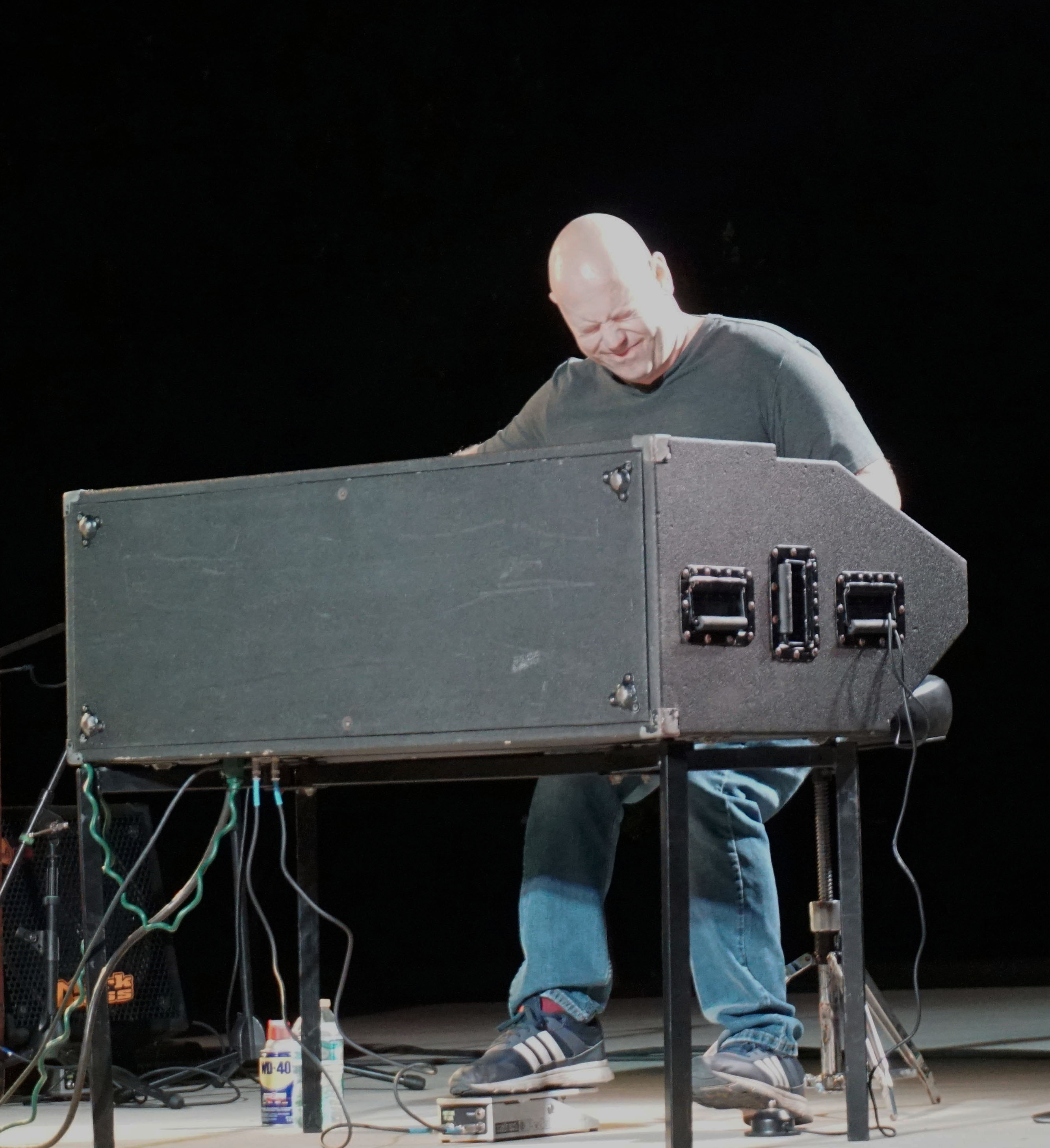
Toby Lee Marshall on September 8, 2018

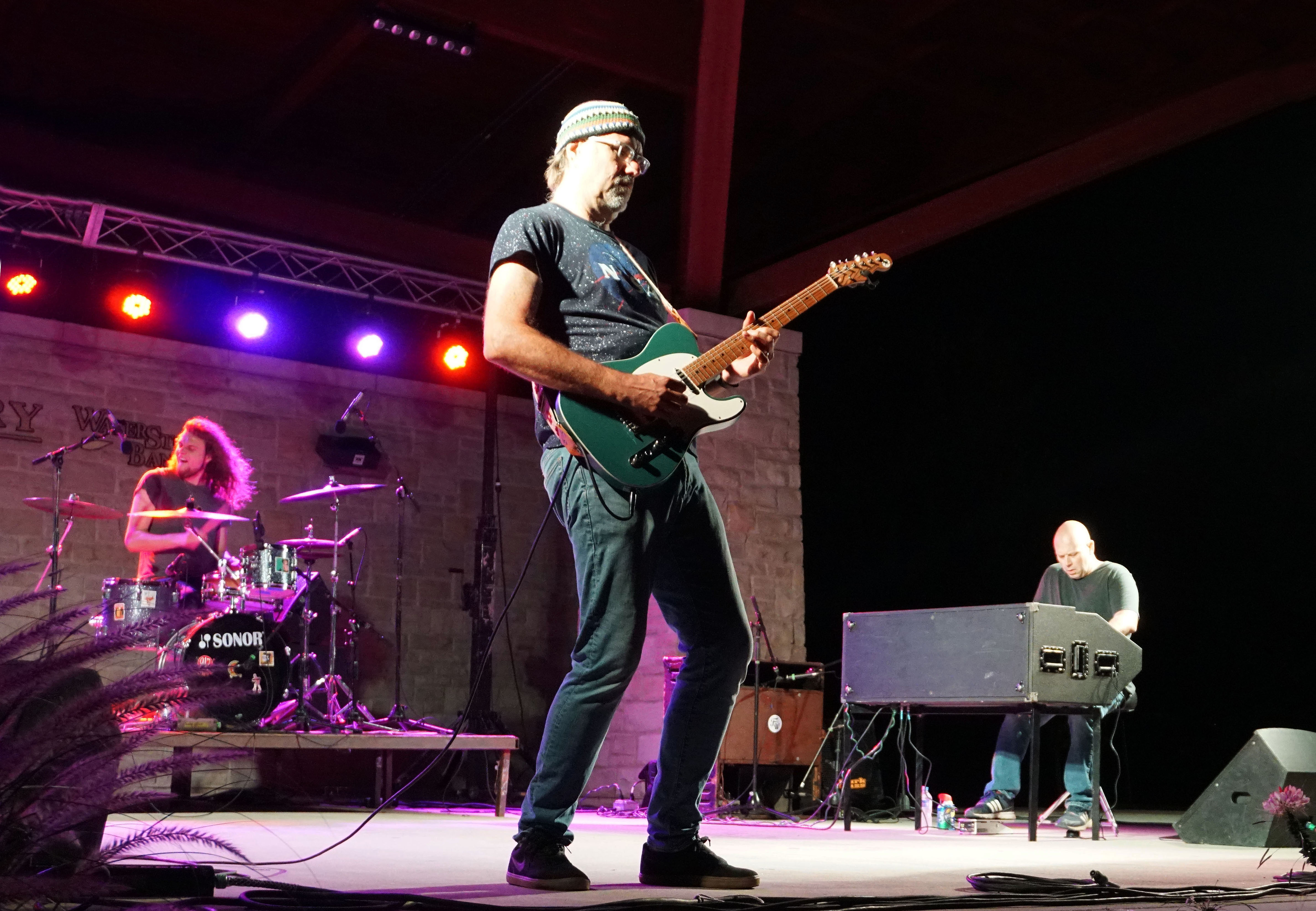
From left, Dylan Koch on drums, Greg Koch and Toby Lee Marshall September 8, 2018

The album Toby Arrives is entirely instrumental. Both Greg Koch and Marshall have each spent the majority of their careers playing instrumental songs.

The Koch Marshall Trio's debut album Toby Arrives contains songs that, "morph into an amazing new relationship with organ influenced Blues Rock."

The first studio album by the Koch Marshall Trio has received high praise. Pendragon's review of the album borders on hyperbole: "Toby Arrives is the sort of album you could stack alongside a Thelonious Monk record, a Jeff Beck record or a Michael Landau record. If you went for one of the other three and got this by mistake your day wouldn't be ruined."

Scope Magazine's R.M. Engleman praised the mix of classic and non-traditional styles, saying "Greg’s playing is a little jazzy, a little funky, and the riffs are untraditionally cool...A lot of little nuances here with both the B3 and guitar.

== Track listing ==
All tracks are written by Greg Koch, Toby Lee Marshall and Dylan Koch.

Toby Arrives
No.	Title	Length
1.	"Toby Arrives"	5:48
2.	"Funk Meat"	1:42
3.	"Heed The Boogalow"	5:45
4.	"Lets Get Sinister"	7:48
5.	"Mysterioso"	9:57
6.	"Enter The Rats"	5:06
7.	"Boogie Yourself Drade"	5:17
8.	"Sin Repent Repeat"	4:20

== Personnel ==
Koch Marshall Trio

- Greg Koch – Lead guitar, Rhythm guitar, Vocals
- Toby Lee Marshall – Hammond Organ
- Dylan Koch – Drums
