= Jeremy Porter =

American singer and songwriter

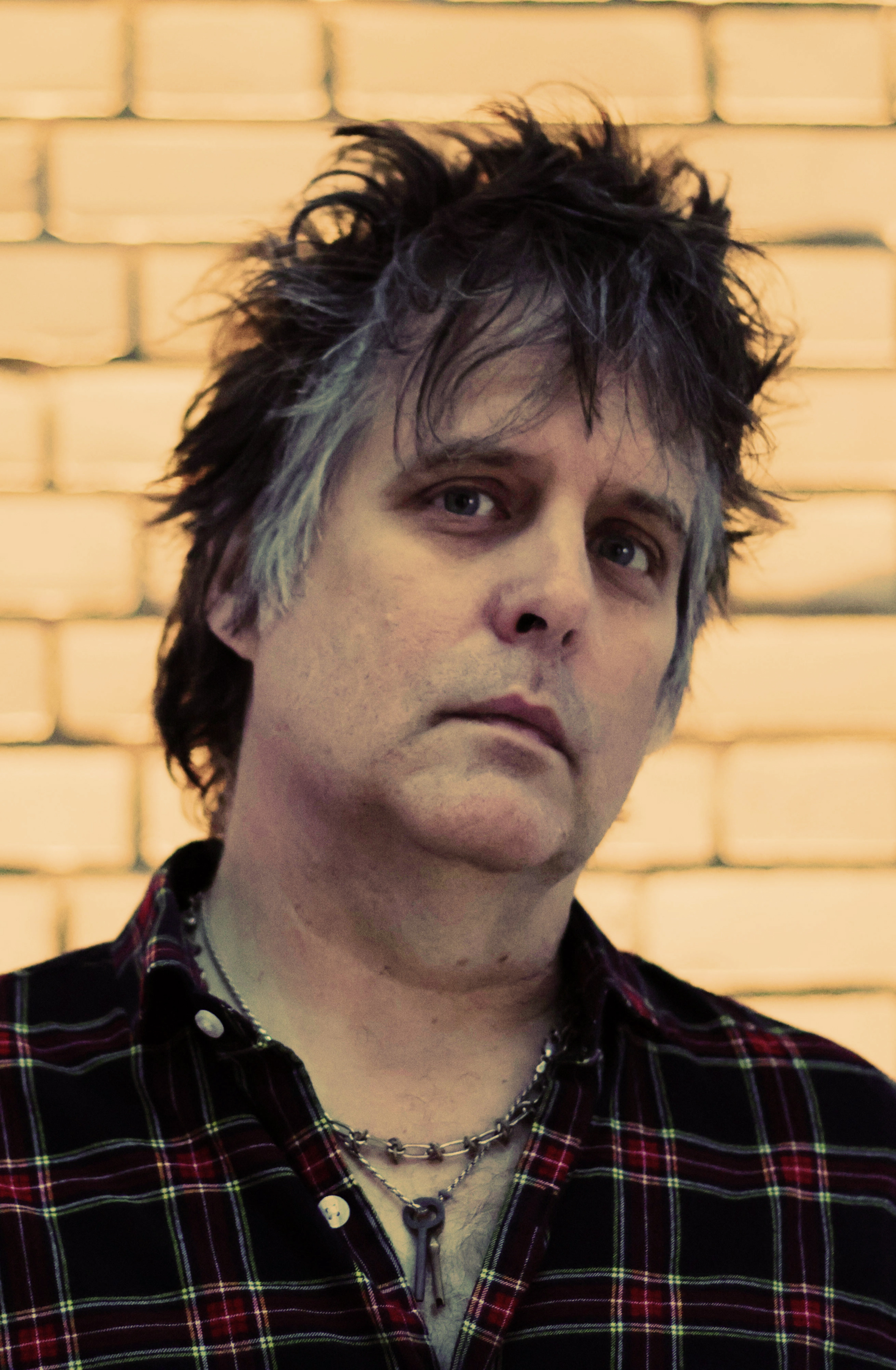
- Jeremy Porter - 2024

Background information
- Born: Alpena, Michigan, United States
- Occupations: Guitarist, singer/songwriter, producer, writer
- Instruments: guitar, vocals, organ
- Years active: 1985–present
- Labels: GTG Records; New Fortune Records; Magwheel Records; Red Eye Growler Records; I-94 Recordings
- Member of: Jeremy Porter and The Tucos
- Formerly of: The Regulars; The OffRamps; SlugBug; Clashback; Fidrych; Chutes & Ladders
- Website: jeremyportermusic.com

Jeremy Porter is a guitar player, singer and songwriter from Marquette, Michigan, currently living in Plymouth, Michigan (near Detroit). He is the founder of the Detroit-based band Jeremy Porter & The Tucos and co-founder of The Regulars, considered one of the first punk bands in the Upper Peninsula of Michigan.

== Early life ==
Jeremy Porter was born in 1969 in Alpena, Michigan, a small town in the Lower Peninsula of Michigan, to John and Francie Porter. Jeremy has a younger sister, Kristen Porter. Jeremy started playing guitar at an early age, but became bored with the instrument and stopped playing until he was grounded for a summer for vandalizing the house of the vice principal of his junior-high school. With nothing else to pass the time, he picked up the guitar again and stuck with it.

=== Influences ===
Porter's first exposure to music came from his parents' record collection as he gained an early appreciation for The Beatles and The Beach Boys, then later The Rolling Stones, Bob Dylan, Gordon Lightfoot and Fleetwood Mac. In the late 70s, like many his age, Porter discovered and latched onto Kiss before expanding into American power pop bands like The Knack and Cheap Trick. In the early 80s, he saw The Who's final concert broadcast on HBO and became enamored with their aggressive style and attack and the guitar playing of Pete Townshend. Around the same time, Porter became obsessed with heavy metal bands like Ozzy Osbourne, Iron Maiden and Scorpions, looking for something even edgier than The Who, but with a smaller sphere of influence that was more inclusive.

== Bands ==
=== The Regulars (Marquette) ===
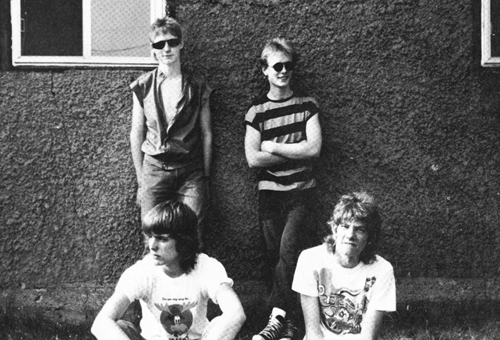
The Regulars c. 1986: Fritz Vankosky, Tim Demarte, Jeremy Porter, John Burke.

In 1984, the Porters moved to Marquette, Michigan, the largest city in the Upper Peninsula of Michigan (UP). Though still small by population standards, Marquette offered more culture and options for a young musician, and Jeremy soon met John Burke, a drummer who shared Porter's love for The Who. The two 16-year-olds formed The Regulars with bassist Fritz Vankosky and singer Tim Demarte in early 1985. Burke immediately exposed Porter to the world of punk rock and the bands of the genre from California, Minnesota, New York and England, which Porter embraced as a more achievable music plateau than the metal bands he loved presented, and an opportunity to bond with his new friends.

The Regulars played mostly punk and 1960s garage covers by bands like Ramones, Dead Kennedys, The Replacements, The Monkees and The Who, but by 1987 the members were each writing songs and the band would occasionally play their originals. The Regulars stayed together until Burke and Vankosky moved downstate to go to college in the fall of 1987, but got together in Marquette for reunion shows in 2003, 2005, 2007, and 2012. Burke would go on to form WIG and record 2 records for Island/PolyGram Records. Vankosky went into music production and engineering and would join the Psychopathic Records team and work with Insane Clown Posse and Twiztid.

Considered one of the earliest punk bands in the UP, the band's influence can still be felt today in the Marquette music scene.

=== Chutes and Ladders and SlugBug (Detroit) ===
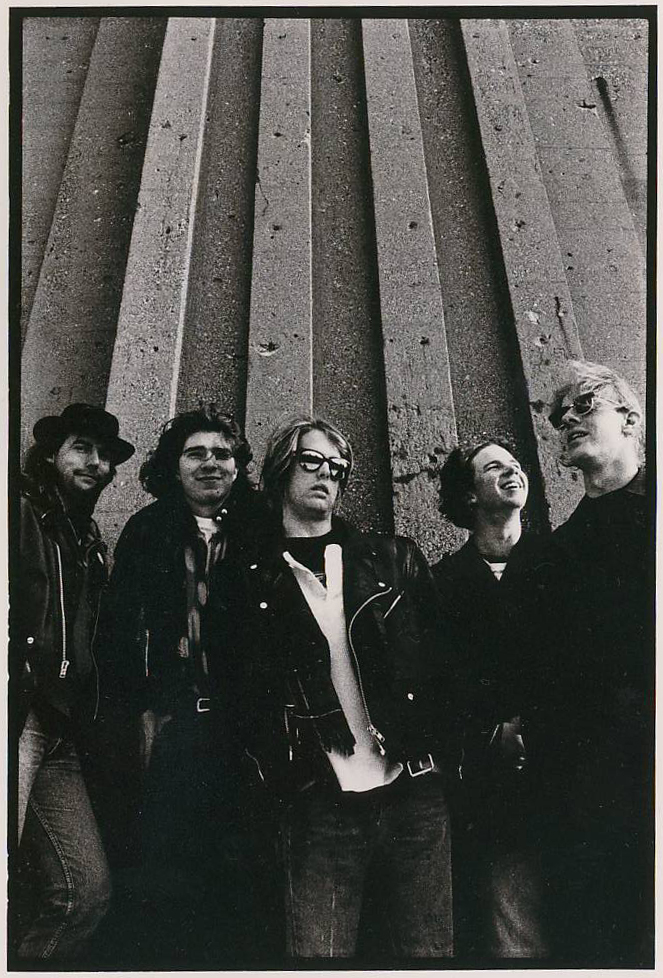
Chutes & Ladders c. 1991: Brian Wimpy, Dan Cervantes, Jeremy Porter, Brad Hales, William Brennan.

In September 1988, Jeremy Porter moved to Ypsilanti, Michigan, where he attended Eastern Michigan University. After two years of failing to find like-minded musicians, Porter met Brian Wimpy, Brad Hales, Dan Cervantes and William Brennan who took him in as the fifth member of their new band Chutes and Ladders. The band played regionally for two years, including a trip to Philadelphia, where they opened up for the well known bands Tar and The Unsane, but only after (as a favor to the promoter) they agreed to tell people they were Cum Dumpster, the Detroit band originally booked for the show, who had cancelled with little notice. Porter and Brennan were the chief songwriters with Hales and Cervantes contributing occasionally. On August 12, 1991, Chutes & Ladders played with a young punk band from California called Green Day at a house party in Grosse Ile, MI, just a couple years before their breakout album Dookie!.

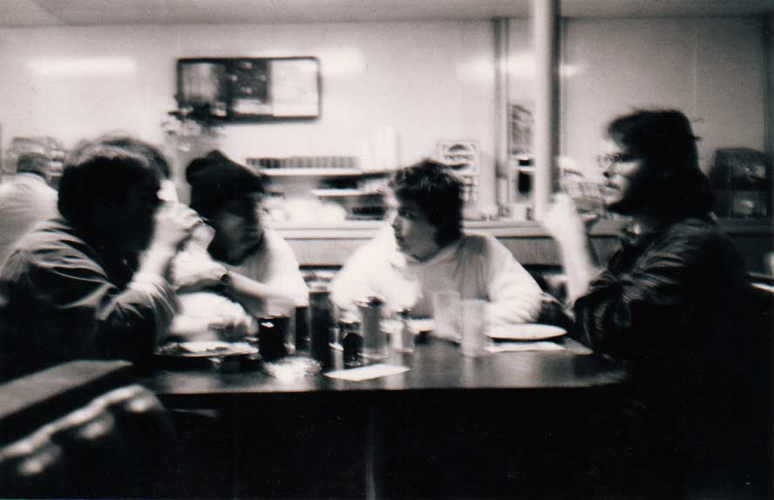
SlugBug early promotional photo (1992). LtoR: Chris Hartmann, Brian Wimpy, Jeremy Porter, W. Randy Barrett III

In 1992, Jeremy Porter and Chutes and Ladders drummer Brian Wimpy formed SlugBug with Randy Barrett III and Chris Hartmann. SlugBug would become a nationally established pop punk band, releasing two EPs, two 7-inch singles and a posthumous anthology for Chicago record label Red Eye Growler Records. The band toured the Midwest and East Coast extensively before breaking up in 2000 amidst tensions between members and their desires to play in other projects. SlugBug was nominated for Album of the Year at the Detroit Music Awards in 1992 for their debut EP Strong Enough for a Man...But Made for a Woman.

=== Clashback ===
Porter and Hartmann formed Clashback in 2000. Described as "A celebration of the music of The Clash" rather than a tribute band, because the members did not try to look, act, or sound like The Clash, but rather, a Midwest bar band playing all Clash songs. Clashback played regularly for four years and continues to perform occasionally today. Clashback was never intended to be more than a side project for Porter, but it was his primary focus and outlet between the breakup of SlugBug and the formation of The OffRamps.

=== The OffRamps ===
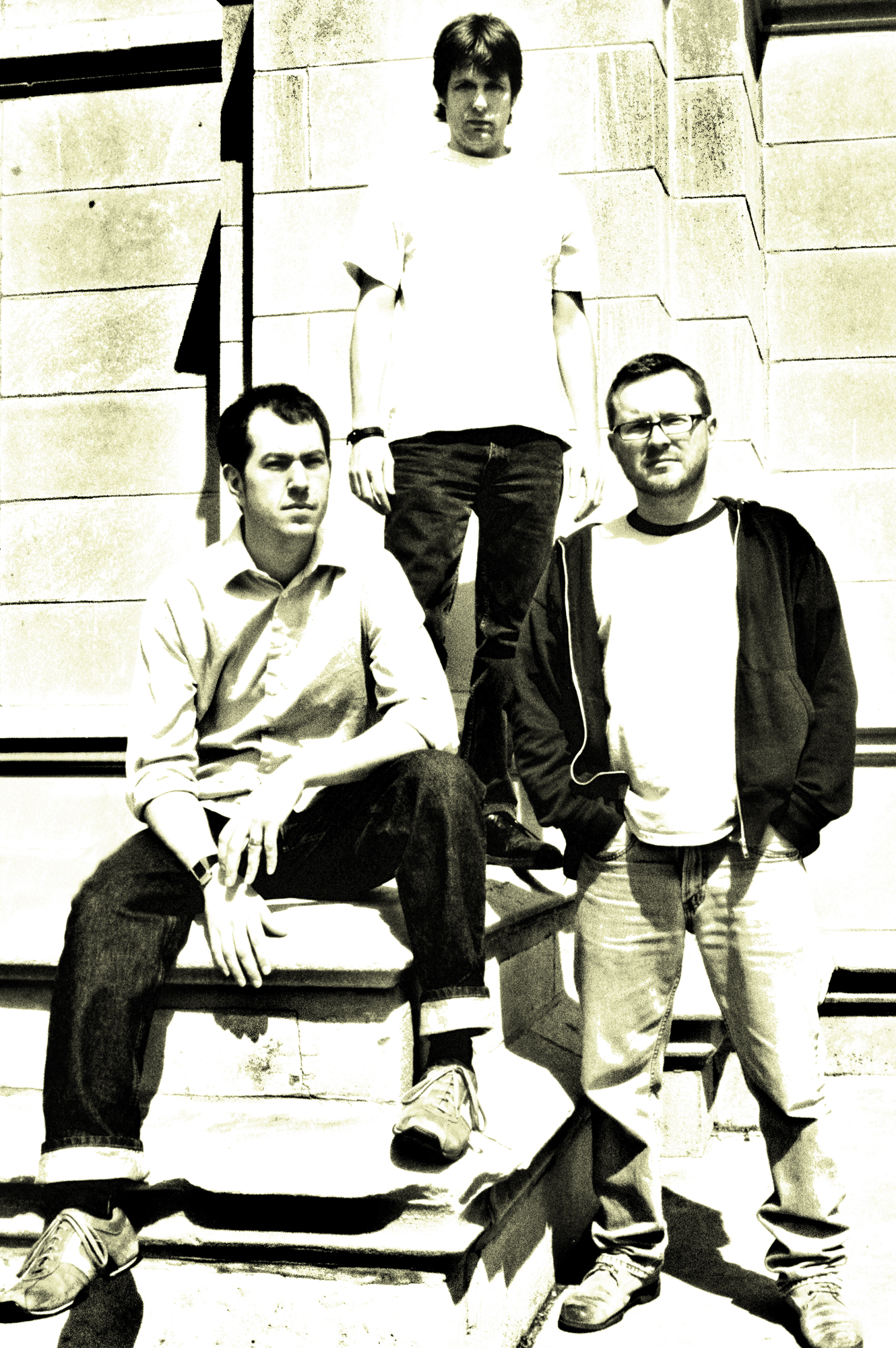
The OffRamps promotional photo (2008). Clockwise LtoR: Mike Popovich, Jeremy Porter, Jason Bowes. Photo: Angie Papalas

In 2002, Jeremy Porter recruited bassist Jason Bowes (Culture Bandits, Head Injury, The Hoolapoppers) and drummer Mike Popovich (The Holy Cows, 3-Speed) and formed The OffRamps, a power pop band. The OffRamps recorded two albums for Ann Arbor, Michigan's Deluxe Records, Hate It When You’re Right (2006) and Split The Difference (2008) before breaking up in December 2008 after member's commitments to other projects made working together difficult. In their eight years, The OffRamps played extensively across Michigan and Ohio. Popovich would move on to join Bloodshot recording artist Whitey Morgan and the 78s and later Ann Arbor-based Blue Snaggletooth, and Bowes would remain on bass for Porter's next two bands: Fidrych, and The Tucos.

=== Solo Acoustic ===
==== Party of One (2010) ====
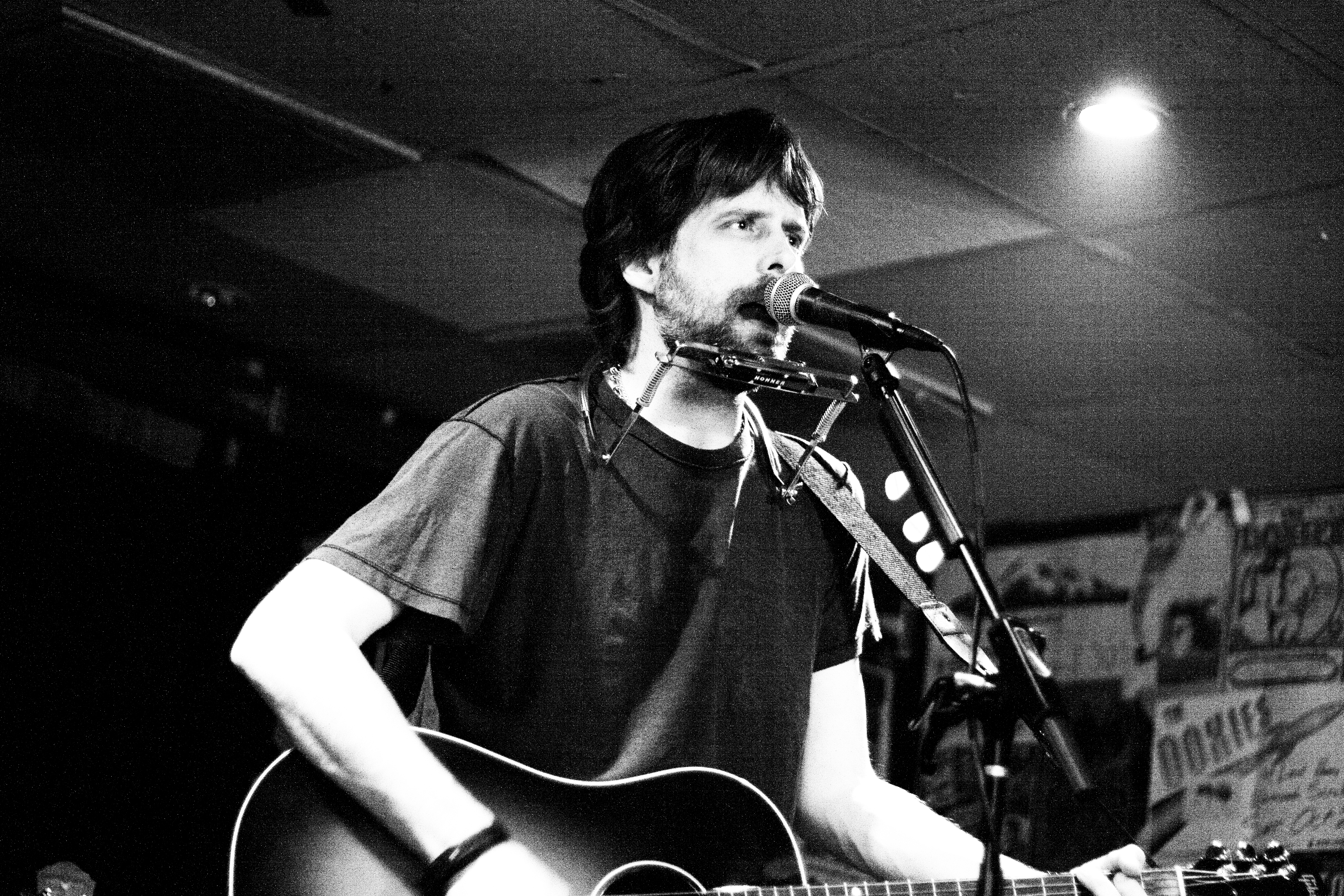
Jeremy Porter, solo- acoustic (c. June 2011, St. Louis, MO.)

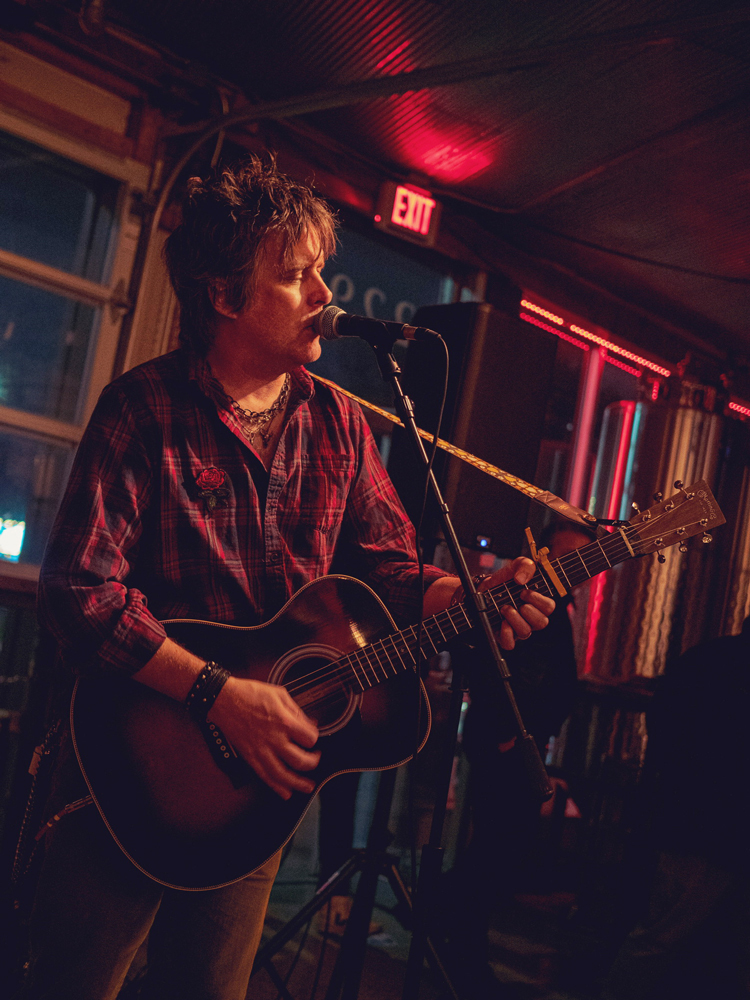
Jeremy Porter, solo-acoustic (c. June 2022, Ferndale, MI.), Photo: David Kellogg

As The OffRamps were breaking up, Jeremy Porter started playing solo-acoustic shows, pulling material from the catalogs of his previous bands and working on the material that would become Party Of One, Party of One was a Regulars reunion of sorts, co-produced and mixed by Fritz Vankosky, with his bass playing on some tracks. John Burke played drums on several tracks and Tim Demarte co-produced a session with Marquette-based vocalist Jenna Gueke for the track "Last Time I Saw You Happy". Also appearing on the record were Randy Barrett III, original SlubBug guitarist, who co-wrote the song "Out Inside" and contributed backing vocals, Ken Haas from Reverend Guitars, and Be Hussey (Morsel) who played bass and engineered Burke's drum sessions at Comp'ny Recording Studio in Los Angeles, California. For the first time since SlugBug, Jeremy toured extensively in support of the record, hitting several major markets in the United States including New York City, Nashville Chicago St. Louis, Minneapolis, and for the first time, Canada, playing shows in Toronto, Montreal, and Wakefield, Quebec.

For the next decade or so Jeremy played the occasional solo set but focused mostly on his work with The Tucos. In 2018 he contributed a cover of Steve Earle's "Christmas in Washington" to the annual Bermuda Snohawk Christmas compilation CD.

==== 1987 EP (2019) ====
In 2019 Jeremy released the 1987 EP on GTG Records – 4 new acoustic-based songs recorded in his basement and mixed by Tucos bandmate Gabriel Doman. He did a few shows supporting the release in 2019 (including headlining a small festival on a goat farm. In 2021, as the music business slowly emerged from the Covid 19 pandemic, Jeremy played a private party in Ypsilanti, MI with Ben Nichols of Lucero and Shane Sweeney of Two Cow Garage and some solo-acoustic dates in the Midwest before teaming with Lansing's The Wild Honey Collective for a tour out to the east coast and back. Porter opened the shows and took a support role on lap steel guitar, mandolin, and guitar with The Wild Honey Collective. Jeremy would play lap-steel on The Wild Honey Collectives second album Volume 2 on the Buck Owens' track "There Goes My Love," a staple of the live set on that tour.

==== Dynamite Alley (2024–2025) ====
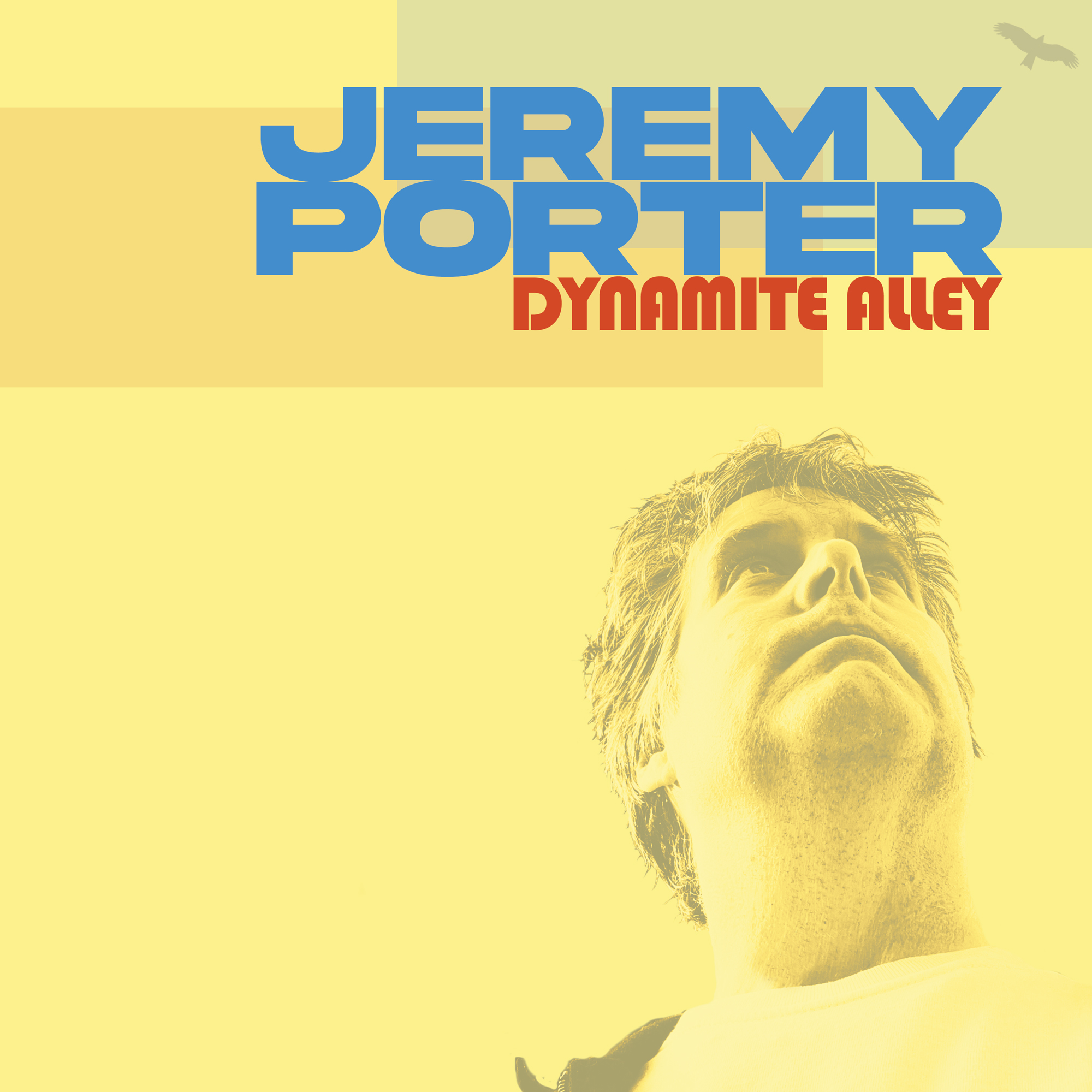
Album cover for Dynamite Alley (GTG Records) by Jeremy Porter

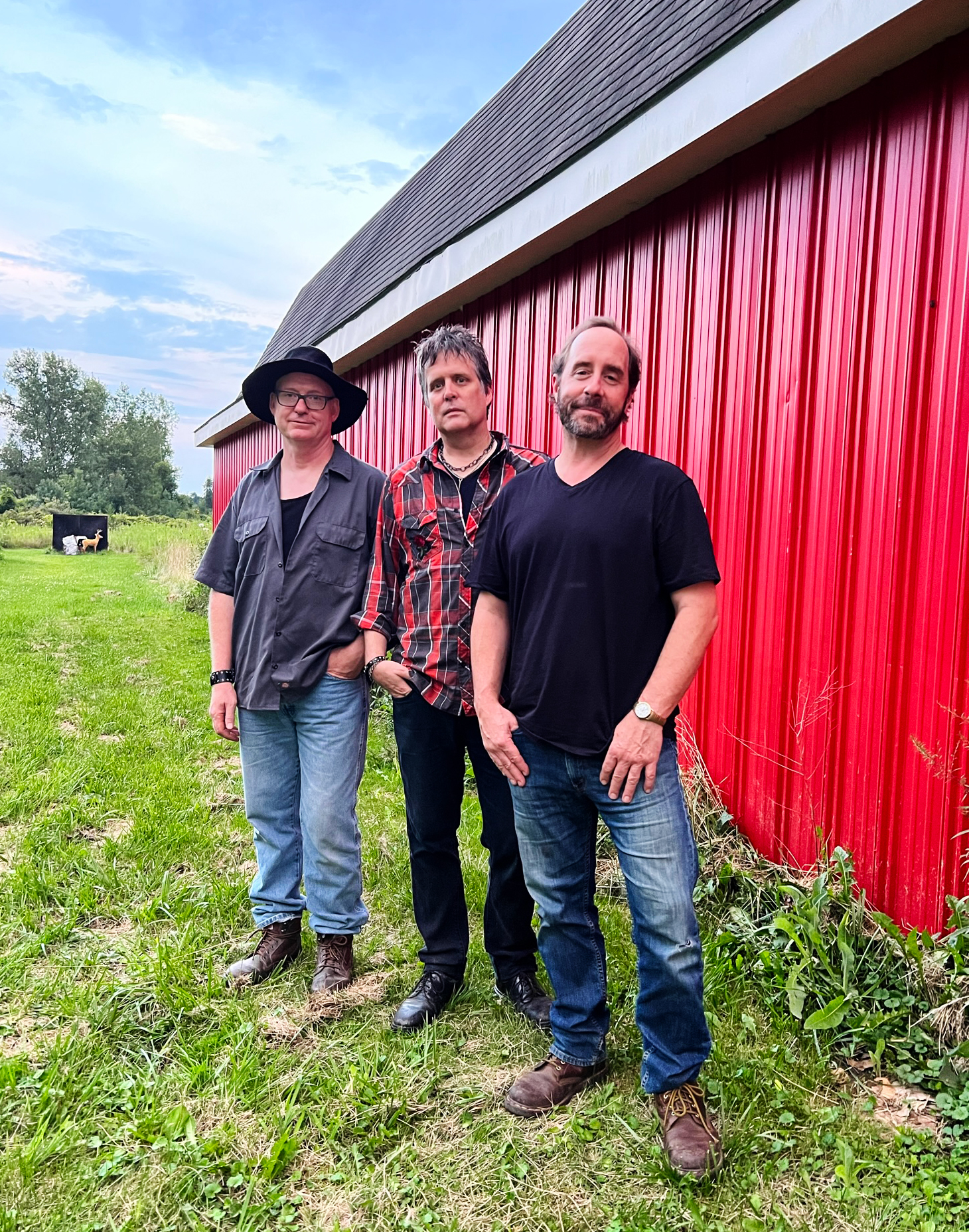
The Jeremy Porter Band (Detroit, MI) c. 2024 L-R - Fritz Van Kosky, Jeremy Porter, David Below (Photo - Noreen Porter)

In September, 2024, Jeremy released Dynamite Alley (GTG Records), his first full-length solo album since Party of One in 2010. The album featured contributions from GTG Records Labelmates The Wild Honey Collective, Drive-By Truckers’ keyboardist Jay Gonzales, The Regulars bassist Fritz Van Kosky, and several other collaborators. The release show was held at Ziggy’s in Ypsilanti, Michigan, featuring the debut of The Jeremy Porter Band, with Van Kosky on bass and Dynamite Alley drummer David Below, as well as special guests Jake O’Riley on upright bass and Noreen Porter on castanets.

Jeremy played over 80 shows supporting Dynamite Alley, his busiest campaign to date, hitting most of the US and 3 Canadian Provinces. The tour took Jeremy to several new markets including Seattle, Washington, where he was joined on stage by Joe Reineke from Alien Crime Syndicate and The Meices..

In July, 2025 Jeremy Played BüddiesFEST in Tillsonburg, Ontario where, in addition to his own set, he joined ex-Hüsker Dü bassist Greg Norton and Jon Snodgrass for a set of Hüsker Dü songs. He also joined Ex-Doughboys Brock Pytel’s Vancouver-based band The SLIP~ons on stage, singing backups on their song “Greystone” about the legendary `80s Detroit punk club. Jeremy was joined by current The Wild Honey Collective/ex-Cheap Girls guitarist Adam Aymour on pedal steel a short, regional BüddiesFest warm-up run with ex-ALL singer Chad Price Peace Coalition.

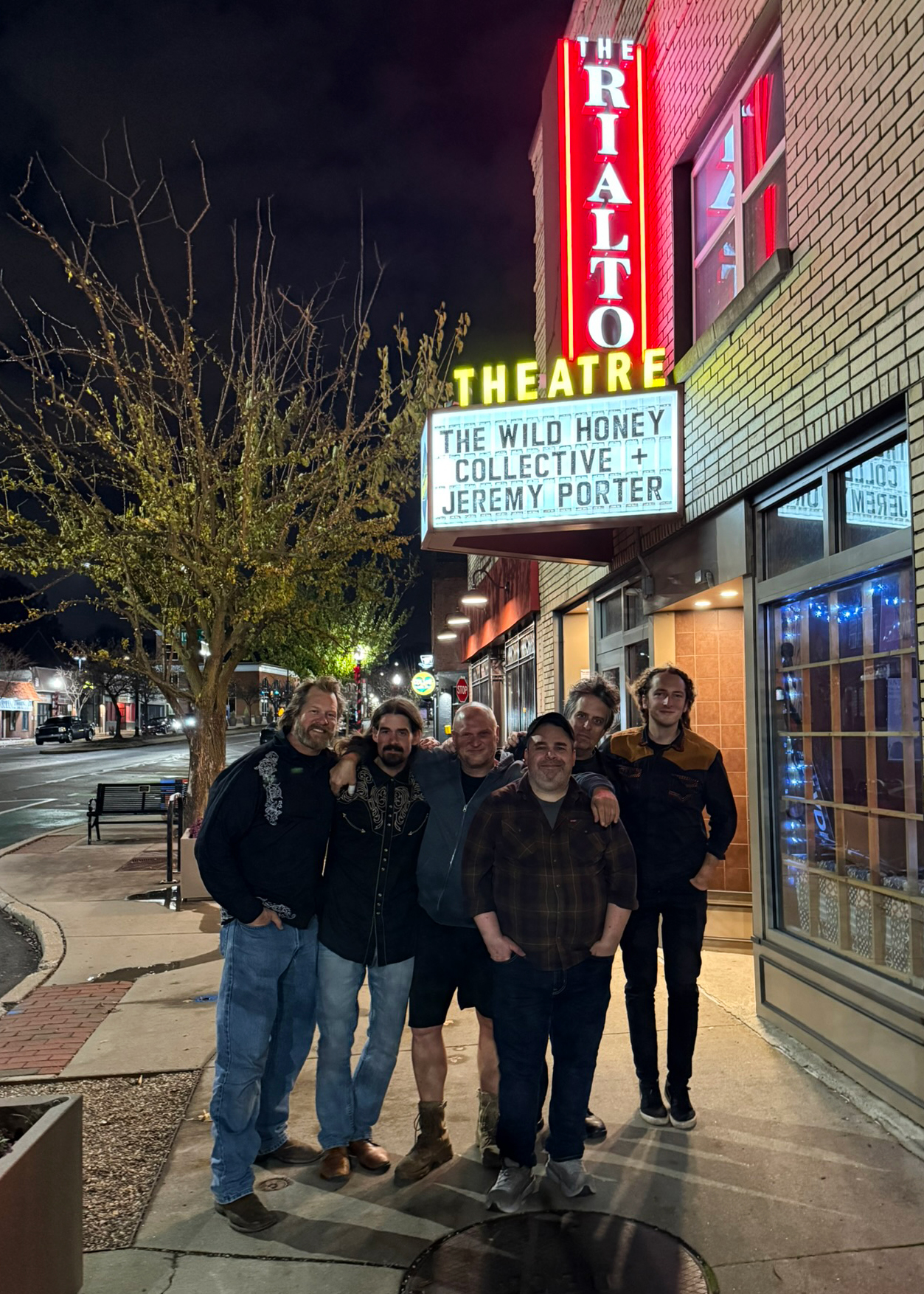
Jeremy Porter and The Wild Honey Collective in Akron, Ohio after the final show of the "Together + Separate Southeast USA Tour Fall 2025" Photo: Brian Lisik

In November, 2025, Jeremy teamed up again with The Wild Honey Collective for a run down to Florida and back, called the “Together + Separate Southeast USA Tour Fall 2025.”

On December 1, 2024, Jeremy released “Colorado Christmas,” a cover of a Nitty Ditty Dirt Band song, as a holiday single on GTG Records. The song was recorded during the Dynamite Alley sessions and the sound and artwork was inline with that project.

=== Fidrych ===
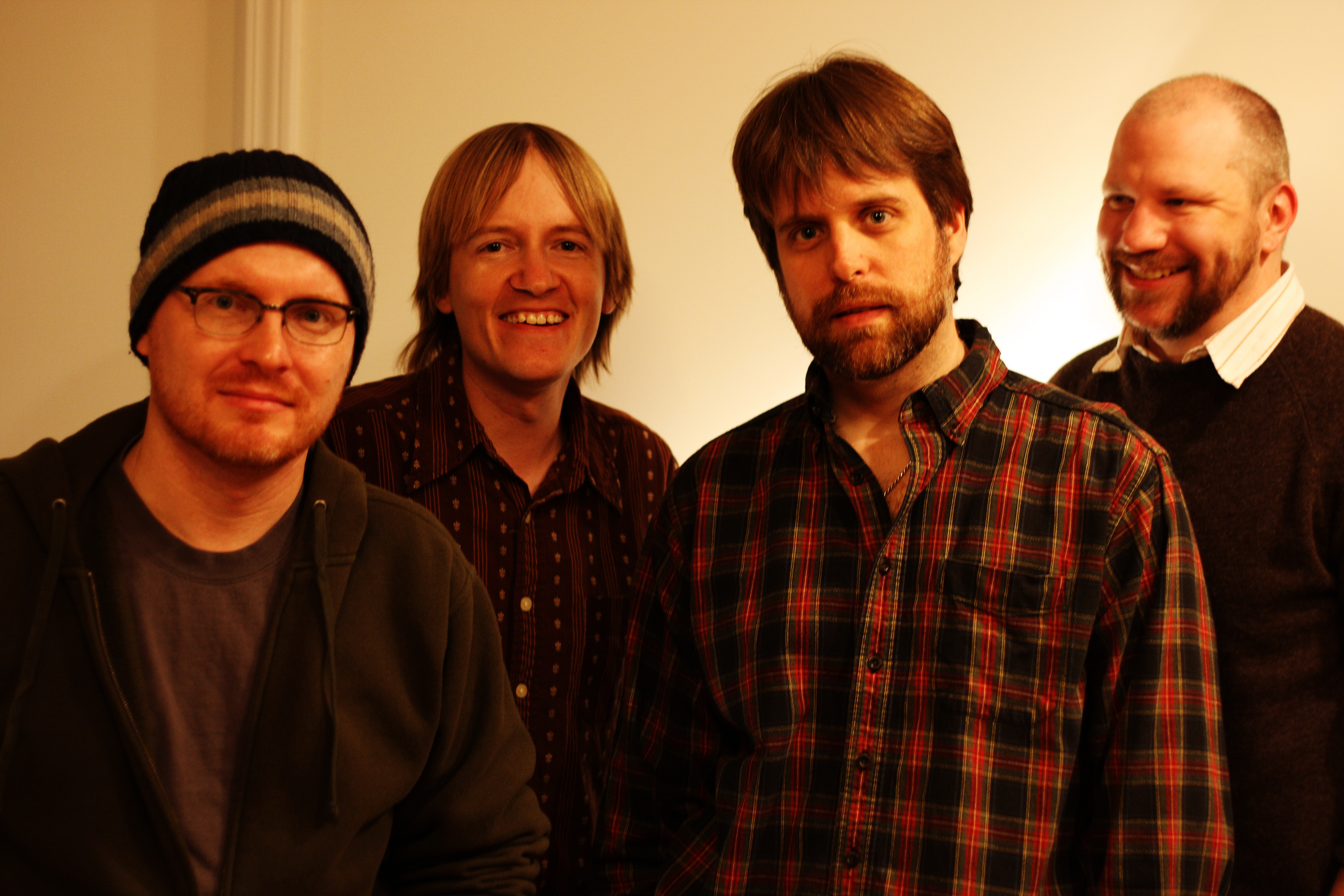
Fidrych (c. 2009) L to R: J. Bowes, S. Bekkala, J. Porter, B. Raleigh.

Shortly after The Offramps disbanded, Jeremy teamed up with OffRamps bassist Jason Bowes and Porchsleeper members front-man Brian Raleigh and drummer Steve Bekkala and formed Fidrych, named after Mark "The Bird" Fidrych, the Detroit Tigers’ eccentric pitcher from the late 1970s. Porter and Raleigh shared songwriting and guitar duties. Fidrych debuted at the 2009 Hamtramck Blowout after a warmup show in Kalamazoo, Michigan, the week before and would go on to play several shows around lower Michigan and a short run to Minneapolis where they played the Uptown Bar shortly before the iconic venue was razed and replaced by an Apple store.

In 2010. Fidrych played just three shows, each in the Detroit area, and Porter focused on his solo-acoustic work in an effort to stay busy and active. Though the band never officially broke up and remain friends, they have not played since, and Raleigh and Bekkala have enjoyed a Porchsleeper reunion that started in 2014.

=== Jeremy Porter and The Tucos ===
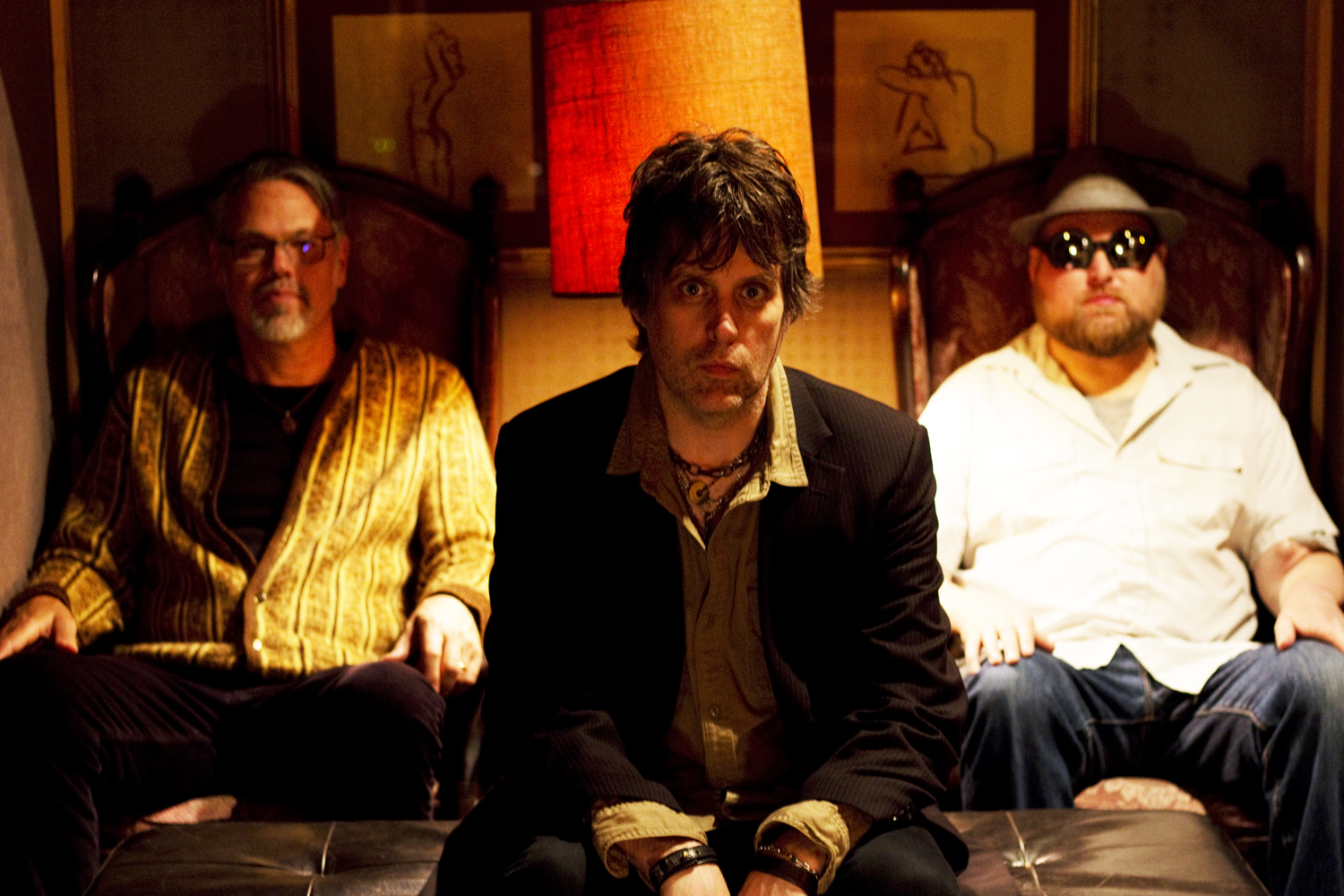
Jeremy Porter and The Tucos c. 2017 L to Right: Patrick O'Harris, Jeremy Porter, Gabriel Doman (Photo: EonZero)

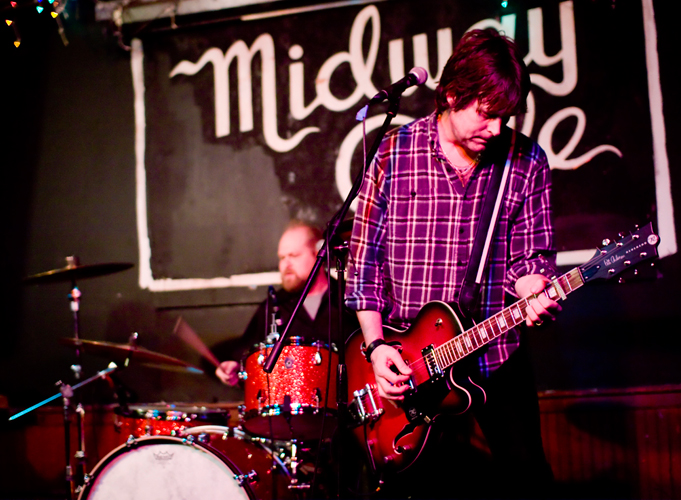
Jeremy Porter and Gabriel Doman on stage in Boston, Mass. on November 16, 2013 during the last show of the Jeremy Porter & The Tucos Partner in Crime 2013 East Coast Tour. (Photo: Kelly Dolen)

In December 2010, frustrated with the lack of activity with Fidrych and bored with the lack of camaraderie and volume that comes with playing and touring solo-acoustic, Porter formed Jeremy Porter & The Tucos with OffRamps/Fidrych bassist Jason Bowes and drummer Gabriel Doman, who had once tried out on Guitar for Clashback several years earlier. Jeremy Porter & The Tucos became very active very quickly and were soon opening for national acts around Detroit and doing short runs of shows around the Midwest. In 2013 they released Partner in Crime and in 2015 they released Above The Sweet Tea Line (with new bassist Patrick O’Harris), both on Detroit's New Fortune Records. The band has toured more extensively than any of Porter's past projects, hitting the Midwest. East Coast, Southeast, Southwest and Deep South as well as Canada multiple times, and was nominated for a Detroit Music Award for "Outstanding Punk/Indie/Alternative Artist/Group" in 2016, Porter's first nomination since SlugBug in 1992.

In 2017, Jeremy Porter and The Tucos played over 40 shows across the US and Canada, including an October run that took them through the Dustbowl and back to Texas for the first time since 2014. They opened shows in Detroit for Ha Ha Tonka (band) and Beach Slang and released their third album, and first for the Lansing-based GTG Records, "Don't Worry, It's Not Contagious." 2018 saw The Tucos play their first ever shows overseas with a nine-show tour of the UK in October. They also released their fifth 7" single "At Least She's Still in Love With You".

The band's 4th album Candy Coated Cannonball was released in January, 2021, but they were unable to tour because of the Coronavirus. The Tucos opened for Soul Asylum in September, one of the band's long-time influences, and played a few regional shows before bassist Bob Moulton left the band. They released a new holiday Song in late 2021 with new bassist Jake Riley and played more shows in 2022 than they had to-date, including opening slots for Cracker and The Reverend Peyton's Big Damn Band. In 2024 the band played out very little while they focused on the recording of their forthcoming fifth album and Jeremy released and toured behind his solo album Dynamite Alley.

== Media placement ==
Several songs by The OffRamps were featured in the independent film Fantasy Football: The Movie in 2007. The band attended the premiere at Emagine Theater in Novi, Michigan.

The songs "Hallmark Holiday" and "Dead on your Feet" from Jeremy Porter, Party of One were used in the PBS series Roadtrip Nation in 2010. "Hallmark Holiday" was included on the soundtrack for the show.

"Knocked Out Cold" by Jeremy Porter and The Tucos was used in Episode 2, Season 1 of the Canadian Bell-Fibe TV series PB With J celebrating the world of plant-based food.

== Collaborations ==
- Jeremy co-wrote the song "Sleep It Off" by Head Injury, a Livonia, Michigan-based band that often played shows with SlugBug. The song was released as a 7-inch single on Red Eye Growler Records in 1996.
- Jeremy often appeared onstage with the Lexington, Kentucky, band Those Crosstown Rivals in 2014, playing guitar on their song "Trucker" and singing a cover of The Replacements’ "Bastards of Young" with TCR front man Bryan Minks. In 2015, he often joined them onstage to sing backup vocals on their show-closer "Blood, Sweat and Tears".
- Jeremy played lead guitar and received a co-writer credit on "Sometimes You Headline, Sometimes You Just Play Last" by Porchsleeper in 2014. The song was originally done by Fidrych. The track was produced by Jim Roll and released digitally by Porchsleeper in 2015.
- Jeremy played guitar and sang backup vocals on "Hey Lydia" and "Best Worst Night" by the Columbus, Ohio, band Watershed in 2015. The tracks were released in 2016 as a "Summer Single" with a few selected bonus tracks and on Watershed's 2024 LP Blow it Up Before it Breaks.
- Jeremy played lap-steel on a cover of Buck Owens' "There Goes My Love" by the Lansing, Michigan, band The Wild Honey Collective on their album Volume 2 in 2022.
- Jeremy co-wrote the song "Wait and See" with Lenny Grassa for his band Popular Creeps out of Detroit, Michigan for their second album All Of This Will End in Tears released on Big Stir Records in 2022.

== Writing ==
=== Concert and album reviews ===
In 2006 Jeremy Porter was a contributor to the now-defunct music website Drastic Plastic. In addition to concert and album reviews he also conducted and published an interview with James Fearnley of The Pogues, which also appeared on the Jer's Pogues Pub website.

In 2013 Porter was a regular contributor to the now-defunct Detroit-based MotorCityRocks website. He regularly reviewed albums and concerts and wrote show previews for upcoming shows in the Detroit area.

In September 2016 Jeremy Porter started contributing reviews and previews to Pencilstorm, a Columbus, Ohio-based blog run by Colin Gawel from the band Watershed (American band). Porter has become the Co-Editor in Chief for the site and is one of the principal contributors and content directors.

=== Rock And Roll Restrooms ===
In 2010 Porter started taking photos of the restrooms in the bars and clubs he was playing at. The photographs were embraced by his social-media followers, especially on Facebook and Instagram. In 2014 Porter compiled several of the photos into a book called Rock And Roll Restrooms: A Photographic Memoir Vol. I: A Unique Look Into The Seedy Underbelly of Small Time Rock And Roll. Small quantities of the book were printed in both hard and softcover and sold while on tour with Jeremy Porter & The Tucos, but due to the high production costs and his focus on music, additional pressings are on hold pending the search for a publishing deal.

== Reverend Guitars ==
Porter is a featured artist for Reverend Guitars, a Michigan–Ohio-based company. Porter owns and plays two of the Pete Anderson signature models, and they have become a key element to his respected tone.

== Personal life ==
Porter currently lives in Plymouth, Michigan, with his wife Noreen. The couple have been married since 1996 and have no children. Between the demanding touring and recording schedule of Jeremy Porter & The Tucos and his solo work, he stays busy writing about music for Pencil Storm and attending rock shows around Detroit. Outside of music Porter works in the technology field and enjoys traveling with his wife and exploring the culture, food and nightlife of Detroit.

== Discography ==
- Chutes & Ladders (1990). Wyandotte EP.
- Chutes & Ladders (1992). Truck Box EP.
- SlugBug (1992). Strong Enough For A Man...But Made For A Woman. Smatterchoo Records.
- SlugBug (1994). Live It Down b/w Wednesday Tonite/SandPit. Red Eye Growler Records.
- SlugBug (1994). Up From Adirondack. Red Eye Growler Records.
- SlugBug (1995). On The Dime b/w Incomplete Control. Red Eye Growler Records.
- SlugBug (1997). "Values Here". Her Head's On Fire: A Tribute To Dag Nasty. Foolsday Records.
- SlugBug (2006). Coloring Book/Anthology. Red Eye Growler Records.
- The OffRamps (2006). Hate It When You're Right. Deluxe Records.
- The OffRamps (2008). Split The Difference. Deluxe Records.
- Jeremy Porter (2009). "Scarf". Suburban Sprawl Records Holiday Compilation.
- Jeremy Porter (2010). Party of One. Magwheel Records.
- Jeremy Porter & The Tucos (2010). "No Use For Xmas". Suburban Sprawl Records Holiday Compilation.
- Jeremy Porter & The Tucos (2011). Night On The Town b/w Ain't My House Anymore. Magwheel Records.
- Jeremy Porter (2011). "Hallmark Holiday". Roadtrip Nation (PBS Series) Soundtrack.
- Jeremy Porter & The Tucos (2011). "Christmas Dance". Suburban Sprawl Records Holiday Compilation.
- Jeremy Porter & The Tucos (2012). Live & Acoustic @ The Plymouth Coffee Bean.
- Jeremy Porter & The Tucos (2012). "Silver Bells". Suburban Sprawl Records Holiday Compilation.
- Jeremy Porter & The Tucos (2013). Partner In Crime. New Fortune Records.
- Jeremy Porter & The Tucos (2013). Plan B b/w Throwing Stones. New Fortune Records.
- Jeremy Porter & The Tucos (2015). Above The Sweet Tea Line. New Fortune Records.
- Jeremy Porter & The Tucos (2016). "Pretty As You Please". Slimtown Singles: Supporting Bob 'Slim' Dunlap.
- Jeremy Porter & The Tucos (2016). Barrel of Tears B b/w Blue Letter. New Fortune Records.
- Jeremy Porter & The Tucos (2016). Avenues Are For Heroes b/w Real Damaged Girl. LEESTA VALL Records.
- Jeremy Porter & The Tucos (2017). Conventional Wisdom Built to Spill cover. Fourth Line Records.
- Jeremy Porter & The Tucos (2017). "Elimination Round (Live)". GTG100-GTG Records Summer Compilation. GTG Records.
- Jeremy Porter & The Tucos (2017). Huckleberry (+2 Live). GTG Records.
- Jeremy Porter & The Tucos (2017). Don't Worry, It's Not Contagious. GTG Records.
- Jeremy Porter & The Tucos (2017). "Lonely Mrs. Claus". 2017 Holiday Music Collection. Fourth Line Records.
- Jeremy Porter & The Tucos (2018). At Least She's Still In Love With You b/w How About A Beer for Smokey The Bear?. GTG Records.
- Jeremy Porter (2018). "Christmas in Washington". Bermuda Snohawk 2018. Bermuda Mohawk Productions.
- Jeremy Porter (2019). 1987 EP. GTG Records.
- Jeremy Porter & The Tucos (2019). "Christmas Dance". Bermuda Snowhawk 2019. Bermuda Mohawk Productions.
- Jeremy Porter & The Tucos (2019). "No Use For Christmas" and Other Holiday Favorites. GTG Records.
- Jeremy Porter & The Tucos (2020). "Christmas Dance". Night Shadows. Aldora Britain Records.
- Jeremy Porter (2020). "Murder of the Lawson Family/Jingle Bell Rock". Bermuda Snowhawk 2020. Bermuda Mohawk Productions.
- Jeremy Porter & The Tucos (2021). Dead Ringer/Hummingbird Heartbeat. GTG Records.
- Jeremy Porter & The Tucos (2021). Candy Coated Cannonball. GTG Records.
- Jeremy Porter & The Tucos (2021). "Eggnog Time Again". Bermuda Snowhawk 2021. Bermuda Mohawk Productions.
- Jeremy Porter & The Tucos (2022). Bottled Regrets: The Best of the First Ten Years. GTG Records.
- Jeremy Porter & The Tucos (2022). Castaways: Rarities and B-Sides from the First Ten Years. GTG Records.
- Jeremy Porter & The Tucos (2022). Patty's Not Impressed: Live in Toronto. GTG Records.
- Jeremy Porter & The Tucos (2022). "Echos Myron". All Good Kids – A Tribute To Guided By Voices. Phonophore Records.
- Jeremy Porter & The Tucos (2022). Tonight Is Not the Night/DTW. GTG Records.
- Jeremy Porter & The Tucos (2022). "The I'm Alone at Christmas and All the Liquor Stores Are Closed Blues". Bermuda Snowhawk 2022. Bermuda Mohawk Productions.
- Jeremy Porter & The Tucos (2023). "Five-Foot-Three and Tiger Eyes/While You Spiral". Five-Foot-Three and Tiger Eyes/While You Spiral. I-94 Recordings.
- Jeremy Porter & The Tucos (2023). "Christmas Lullaby". Bermuda Snowhawk 2023. Bermuda Mohawk Productions.
- Jeremy Porter (2024). Dynamite Alley. GTG Records.
- Jeremy Porter (2024). Colorado Christmas. GTG Records.
- Jeremy Porter (2024). "Colorado Christmas (Acoustic Version)". Bermuda Snowhawk 2024. Bermuda Mohawk Productions.
- Jeremy Porter & The Tucos (2025). "Put You On Hold (Live in North Little Rock)". Young River Poet Vol. V: A 50-Song Collection In Support Of 4-Year-Old Loxley Johnson's Fight Against Cancer. Aldora Britain Records.
- Jeremy Porter & The Tucos (2025). "Saint Nicotine". Bermuda Snowhawk 2025. Bermuda Mohawk Productions.
