= Jeremy Porter & The Tucos =

American rock and roll band

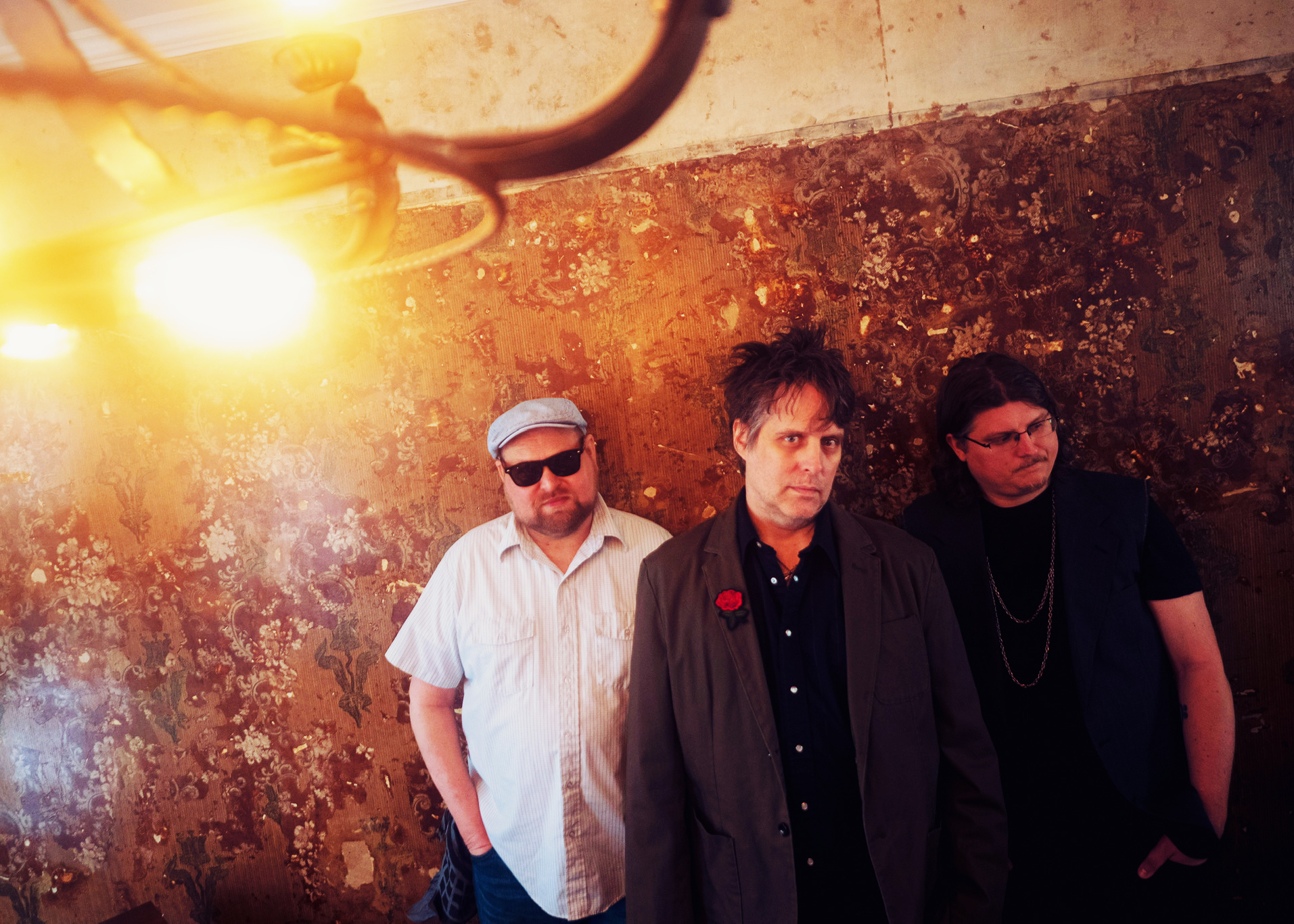
- Jeremy Porter & The Tucos (Photo: David Kellogg)

Background information
- Origin: Detroit, Michigan, United States
- Genres: Power pop, alternative country, cowpunk, alternative rock, punk rock, heartland rock, pop rock, indie rock, rock and roll
- Years active: 2010–present
- Labels: Magwheel Records (Toronto 2010–11); New Fortune Records (Detroit 2012–2016); I-94 Recordings (Detroit 2023); GTG Records (Lansing 2017-present)
- Members: Jeremy Porter; Gabriel Doman; Jake Riley
- Past members: Jason Bowes; Patrick O'Harris; Bob Moulton
- Website: www.thetucos.com

Jeremy Porter & The Tucos is an American rock and roll band from Detroit, Michigan. The band is composed of Jeremy Porter (guitar, vocals), Gabriel Doman (drums, vocals), and Jake Riley (bass, vocals). Their sound has been described as a combination of classic American powerpop and alternative-country with elements of punk and Rockabilly. The band is often compared to The Replacements, Cheap Trick, Uncle Tupelo and X.

== History ==
=== 2010: formation ===
Jeremy Porter & The Tucos were formed in the Detroit suburb of Plymouth, Michigan, in November 2010 by Jeremy Porter when he needed musicians to play on a Christmas song he had written for the annual Suburban Sprawl Music Christmas Compilation. Jeremy recruited drummer and multi-instrumentalist Gabriel Doman (The Hotwalls) and bassist Jason Bowes (The OffRamps, Fidrych, Culture Bandits) to round out the trio for the recording session. The lineup would remain intact for four years.

The band's name is based on the character Tuco Ramirez, played by actor Eli Wallach in The Good, The Bad & The Ugly and was an alternative to a suggestion by original bassist Jason Bowes, who proposed The Mortimers, after the Lee Van Cleef character when the band found that a punk band from Poland had already claimed it.

=== 2011–2012 ===
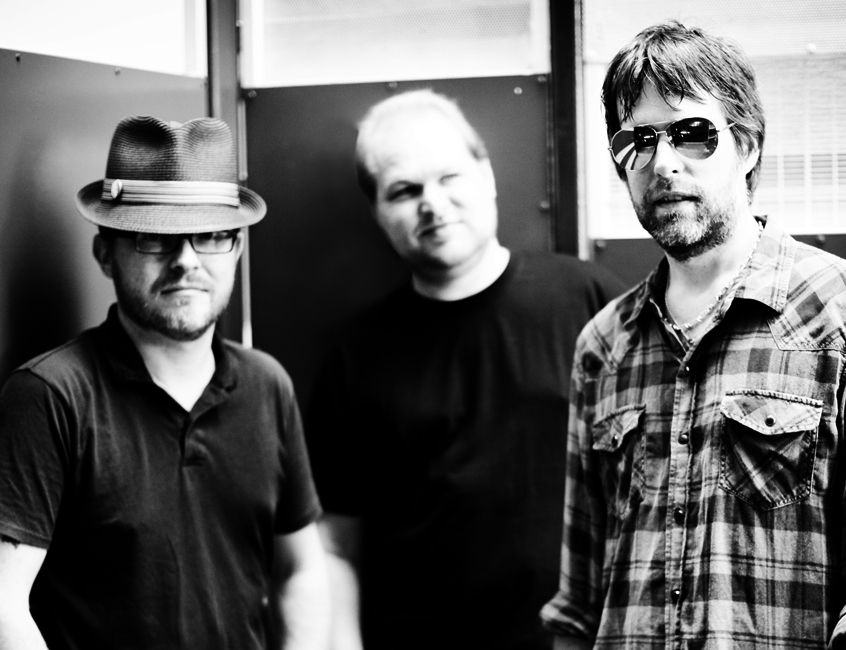
Jeremy Porter & The Tucos c. 2011: Jason Bowes, Gabriel Doman, Jeremy Porter

In 2011, the band released their first single Night On The Town b/w Ain't My House Anymore on the Toronto, Ontario–based record label Magwheel Records and started playing regional shows across the upper-Midwestern United States. Their third show was a coveted support slot for Jesse Malin & The Saint Marks Social at Small's Bar in Hamtramck, Michigan. That same year they made their first appearance at the Hamtramck Blowout, now known as the Metro Times Blowout, a music festival featuring mostly Detroit-area bands, and crossed the border into Canada for their first shows in Toronto, Ontario, Montreal, Quebec, and Wakefield, Quebec. The Canadian shows and a previous run of Midwestern USA shows were a double-bill with Toronto/Newfoundland singer–songwriter David Picco (Jetset Motel).

2012 saw an increase in activity for the band. They released the live-acoustic ep Live and Acoustic @ The Plymouth Coffee Bean in August, featuring "unplugged" versions of five songs, including "Way It's Been" by David Picco and "My Uncle" by The Flying Burrito Brothers as well as three Porter originals.

=== 2013: Partner In Crime ===
In March 2013 the band released their first full-length LP Partner In Crime on the Detroit-based New Fortune Records. After the release of the album, the band toured more consistently and appeared in bars, clubs, theaters and festivals across the United States, including The CMA Music Festival in Nashville, Tennessee, the Bearded Lady Motorcycle Freakshow in Minneapolis, Minnesota, and the Common Ground Music Festival in Lansing, Michigan. In November 2013 the band embarked on their longest tour to date, playing up and down the East Coast of the United States, hitting most of the major cities including Brooklyn, New York, Philadelphia, Pennsylvania, Boston, Massachusetts, and Washington D.C.

=== 2014 ===
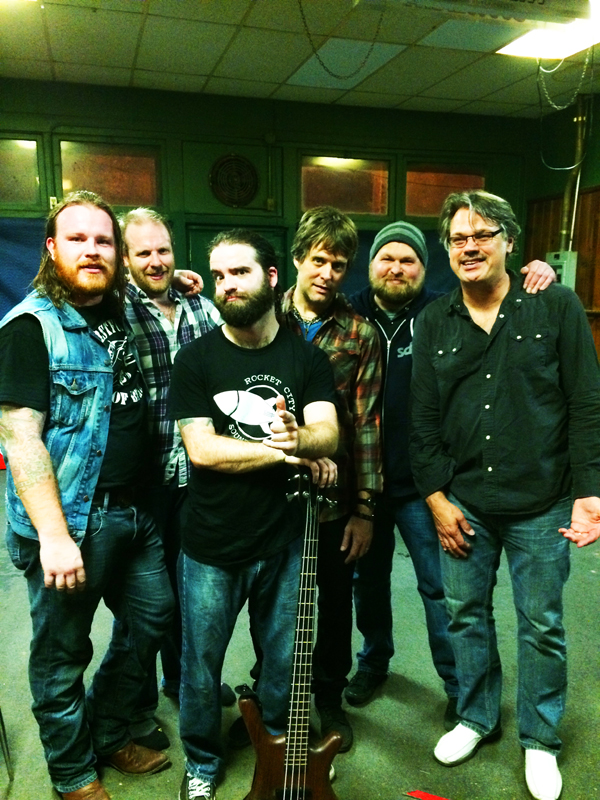
Jeremy Porter and The Tucos with Those Crosstown Rivals in Louisville, Kentucky on October 25, 2014, after the last show of their fall tour (Photo Erica Minks)

2014 saw the departure of original bassist Jason Bowes and the arrival of Patrick O'Harris (Mike Hard Show, Sons of the Gun). O'Harris quickly garnered the nickname "Patty 'Two Shoes'" for the white leather leisure shoes he wears at the band's performances. The band toured the western and southern United States with the Lexington, Kentucky, rock band Those Crosstown Rivals, playing as far west as Denver, Colorado, with the punk band King Rat, and as far south as Houston, Texas, and New Orleans, Louisiana. 2014 also saw the band increase their footprint in the Detroit area with high-profile support slots for bigger-name touring acts like Lydia Loveless, Lee Bains III and The Glory Fires, Two Cow Garage, Supersuckers, and Old Man Markley, and the record release show for ex-Junk Monkey David Bierman.

=== 2015 – Above the Sweet Tea Line ===
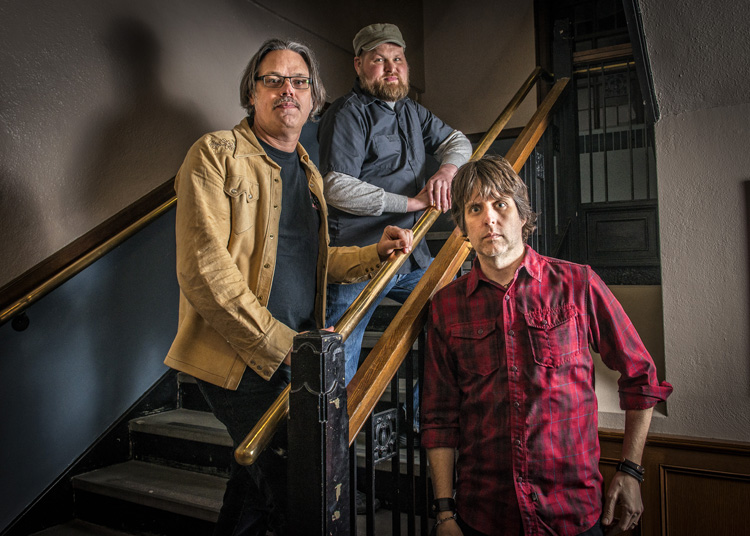
Jeremy Porter & The Tucos c. 2015 (Photo Doug Coombe)

in 2015 the band released the follow-up to Partner In Crime, Above The Sweet Tea Line, on New Fortune Records. The title is a reference to a saying by J. Tyler Gregg of Those Crosstown Rivals who refers to "the sweet tea line" as the divide between the Northern and Southern United States where iced tea comes sweetened by default (South), rather than by request (North). The album was received well by national press and the band continued their aggressive touring schedule throughout the year, including a return appearance at the CMA Music Festival in Nashville and their first appearance at the Detroit Riverdays Festival. The "Above (And Below) The Sweet Tea Line Tour" took them to several new markets, including Chapel Hill, Asheville and Charlotte, North Carolina, Athens, Georgia, Jacksonville, Florida, and Knoxville, Tennessee, among others, as well.

=== 2016 ===
2016 started with the band contributing their song 'Pretty As You Please" to the Slimtown Singles series of songs donated to benefit Slim Dunlap, the guitarist from The Replacements who had suffered a major stroke in 2012. In March 2016, Jeremy Porter & The Tucos were officially nominated for the category "Outstanding Alt/Punk/Indie Artist/Group" at the Detroit Music Awards.

In May, the band continued the "Above (And Below) The Sweet Tea Line Tour" with shows in new markets in upstate New York, the Midwest, and their first Canadian shows since 2014. They recorded a Daytrotter Session in June, and On July 1, they released a new 7" single on New Fortune Records, 'Barrel of Tears,' featuring a cover of the song Blue Letter by Fleetwood Mac on the B-side. The download that accompanies the single includes a bonus track called 'Cemetery Road,' a fictional homage to Columbus, Ohio.

The Tucos toured the Northeast in October, hitting several new cities including Burlington, Vermont, Ithaca, New York, Providence, Rhode Island, and Charleston, West Virginia, as well as several others. Also in October, their second 7" of the year 'Avenues Are For Heroes' was released as a limited edition, hand-cut, antique-lathe pressed clear-vinyl record by LEESTA VALL Records out of Brooklyn, New York.

In November, the band's Daytrotter session was released to the public. Recorded in May in Rock Island, Illinois, between tour dates in Iowa City, Iowa, and Lafayette, Indiana, the session contained four songs and was recorded live to 2-track tape.

=== 2017 – Don't Worry, It's Not Contagious ===
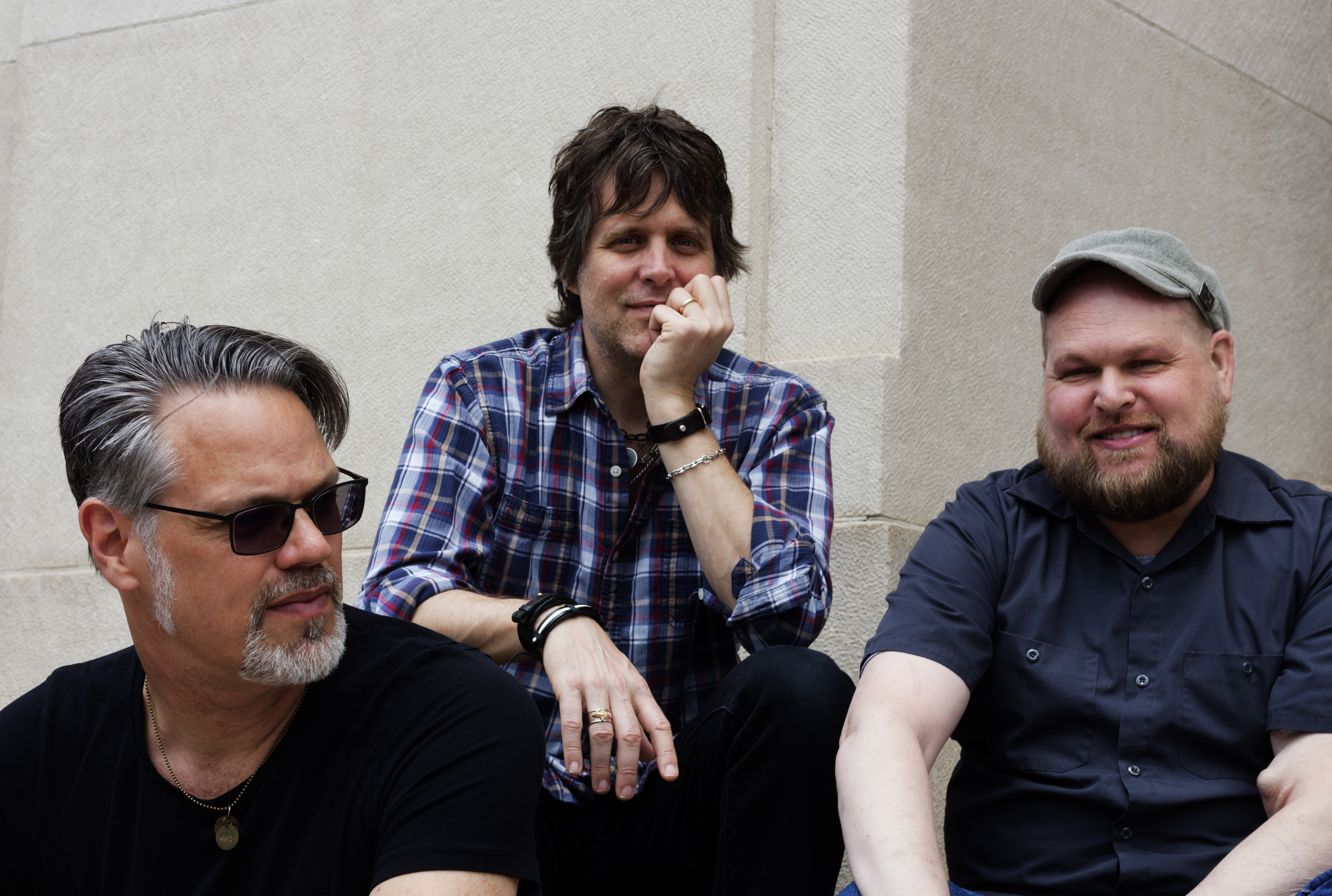
Jeremy Porter & The Tucos c. 2017 (Photo EonZero)

JP & The Tucos spent the first four months of 2017 in pre-production for their third album, writing, demoing, and ultimately returning to The Loft Recording Studio in Saline, Michigan. to record. In may they started a run of 14 shows across the upper-Midwest and south, hitting upstate New York, Pennsylvania, Kentucky, Ohio, Wisconsin and Minnesota. They also played a couple local shows, including an opening slot for Ha Ha Tonka at The Loving Touch in Ferndale, Michigan. They also contributed a version of Conventional Wisdom, originally by the band Built To Spill to a compilation benefiting the ACLU on the newly formed Fourth Line Records label.

The band finished recording in June and the rest of the summer was spent mixing and mastering. In September, The Tucos made their fourth trek into Canada, playing shows in Toronto and Montreal, and their first appearance in Windsor. They also acted as local support for the Philadelphia band Beach Slang's Detroit stop at The Shelter on September 12.

In July the band was introduced as a new addition to the GTG Records roster, a Lansing, Michigan–based record label home to The Plurals, Alpha Rabbit, and many other bands that Jeremy Porter And The Tucos have played with. Their debut on the label was a live version of their song Elimination Round on the label's 100th release compilation GTG100. In September they released the first single "Huckleberry" from their new record "Don't Worry, It's Not Contagious" which was released on November 10. The album was released on CD, digital download, and limited edition 180-gram vinyl pressed at the new Third Man Pressing plant, the vinyl manufacturing branch of Detroit native Jack White's Third Man Records on Detroit's Cass Corridor. A string of 18 Fall shows was also announced to promote the album, including a tour through the Dust Bowl, the Deep South, and back up through West Virginia and Kentucky and back-to-back record release shows in Detroit and Lansing.

=== 2018–2020 ===
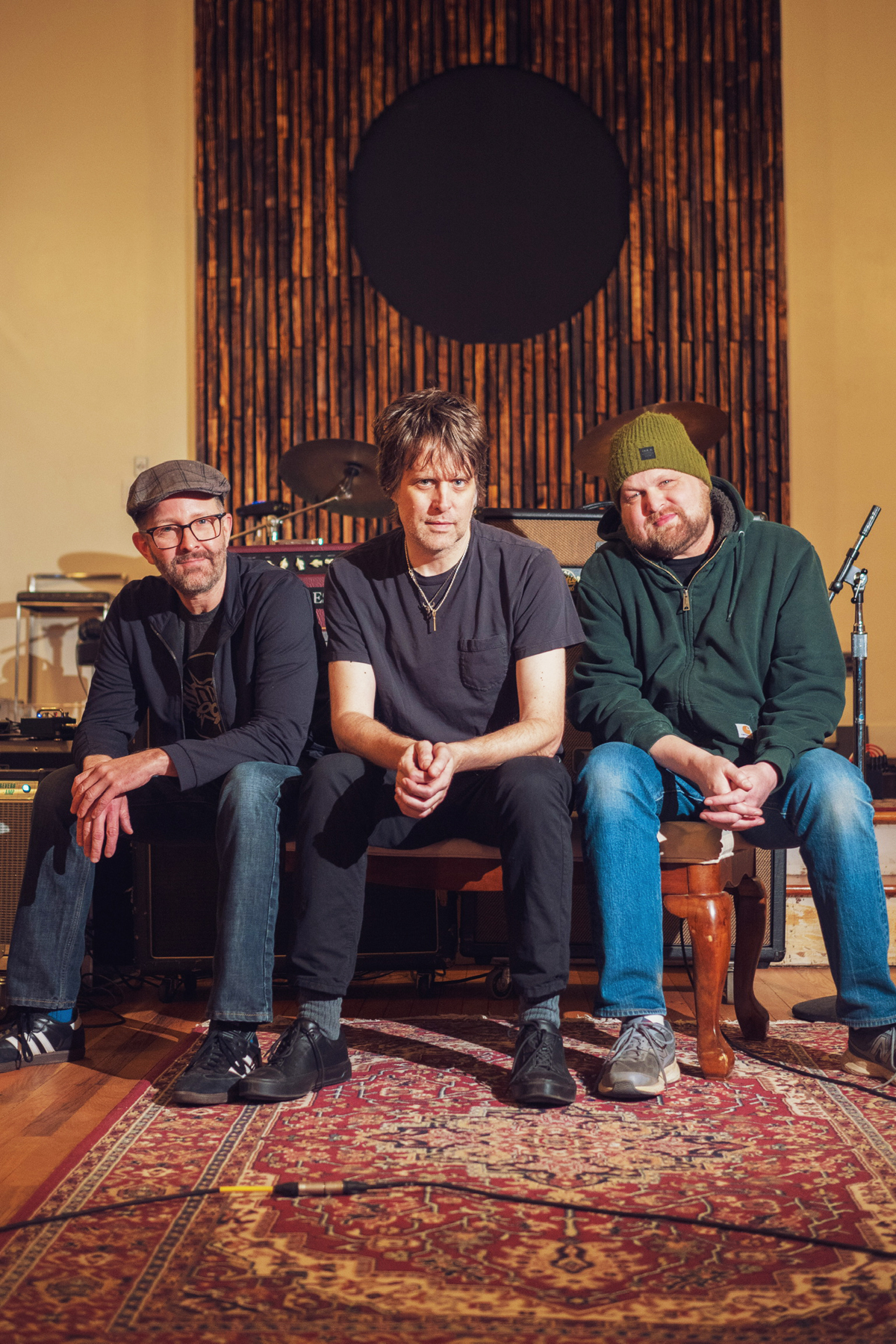
Jeremy Porter and The Tucos c. 2022 at Willis Sound Recording Studio (Photo David Kellogg)

In 2018 The Tucos played over 40 shows including two Canadian runs, and returns to upstate New York, the Rustbelt, and the Midwest. In March, they opened for The Raelyn Nelson Band (fronted by Willie Nelson's granddaughter) at The Brass Rail in Fort Wayne, Indiana, who would go on to invite them to their home-town of Nashville, Tennessee to play with them in December. In October, the band played overseas for the first time with a nine-show tour of the UK which included an appearance at the Swansea Fringe Festival in Swansea, Wales and a well-attended and documented show at The Islington in London. After their homecoming show at PJs Lager House in Detroit on December 1, coinciding with the release of their fifth 7" single, "At Least She's Still In Love With You," The band announced that bassist Patrick O'Harris would be leaving before the end of the year.

In 2019 Bob Moulton joined on bass guitar and the band did a short run through Ohio and Indiana in January, then spent the rest of the winter working on material for a new album, playing the occasional local show. They toured the west and deep south in October 2019 returning to Denver, Colorado, for the first time since 2014 and playing new markets including Omaha, Nebraska, and Wichita, Kansas. In December, they released a collection of Christmas songs recorded over the previous decade called No Use For Christmas and Other Holiday Favorites on GTG Records and closed the year out with a release show at Ghost Light in Hamtramck. In January, 2020 the band started recording the follow up to "Don't Worry, It's Not Contagious" at Willis Sound in Willis, Michigan and wrapped just before the Coronavirus pandemic shut the recording industry down. Because of the pandemic they were unable to tour, but spent the summer locked down, mixing and mastering the album and preparing for its release.

=== 2021–2022 – Candy Coated Cannonball ===
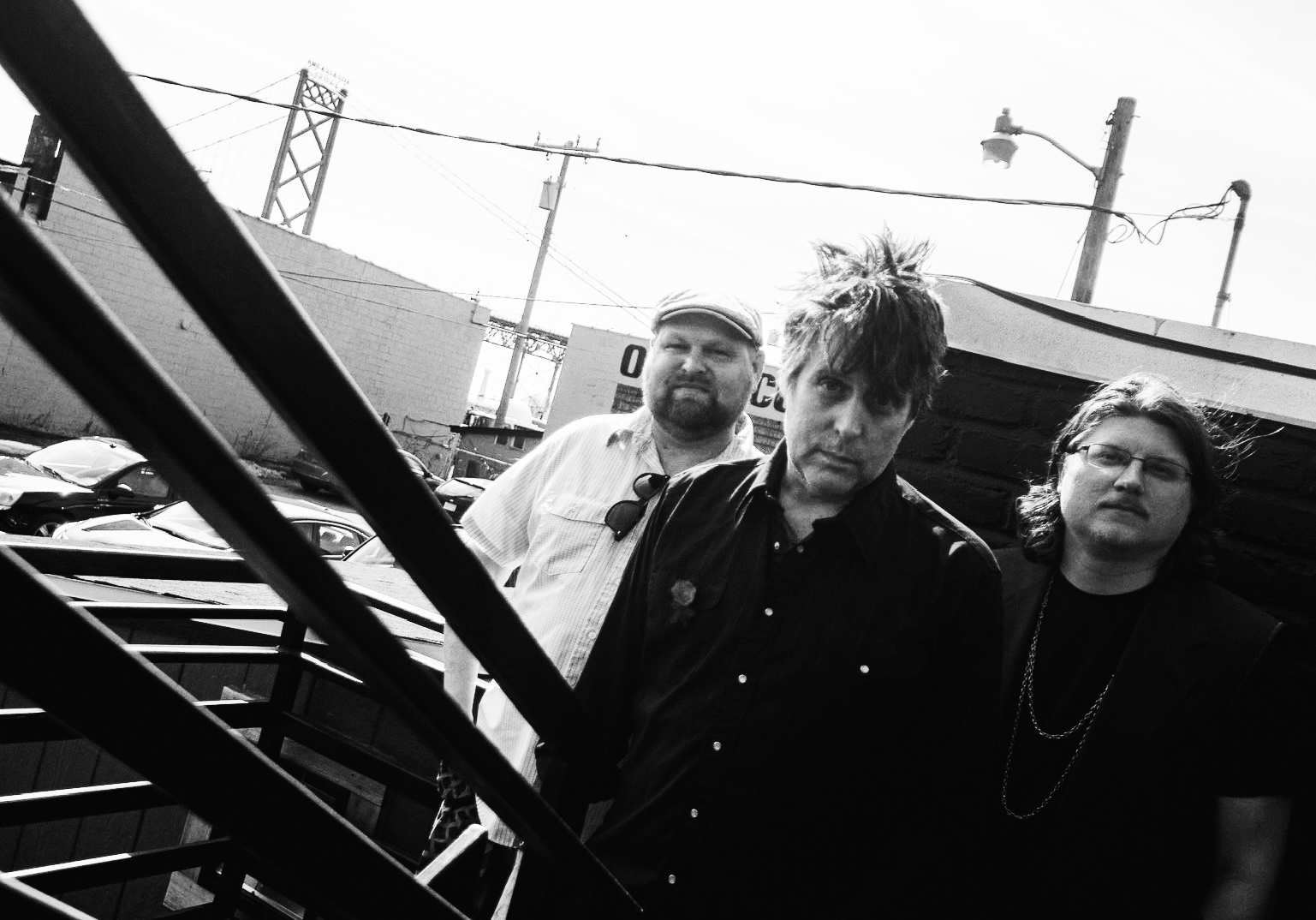
Jeremy Porter and The Tucos c. March 2022, Detroit, MI. - LtoR: Gabriel Doman, Jeremy Porter, Jake Riley (photo: David Kellogg)

In 2021 Jeremy Porter and The Tucos released their fourth album Candy Coated Cannonball on GTG Records in LP/CD and digital formats. The album was announced with a lyric video for the first single “Dead Ringer” and came out on January 22. A second video for “Put You On Hold” was released in June to accompany the release of the album to digital streaming platforms. The record received praise from global press and landed on a couple “Best Of 2021” lists.

Because of the COVID-19 pandemic The Tucos touring was limited to just a few shows, but they did open for Soul Asylum in Detroit in September and played the Pig & Whiskey festival in Ferndale in October. After a run through Charleston, West Virginia, Knoxville, Tennessee, and Lexington Kentucky, Bob Moulton left the band for personal reasons. Their final show with Bob was to be at PJ's Lager House in Detroit, but was cancelled because of a Covid outbreak among the staff. Within a couple weeks The Tucos recruited old friend Jake Riley, who quickly lent his bass playing and harmonies a holiday song called “Eggnog Time Again.”

In 2022, JP & The Tucos played nearly 50 shows, their busiest year ever, hitting many new markets like Baltimore, MD, Roanoke, Va, Raleigh, NC, Tuscaloosa, AL, and Atlanta, GA while maintaining a steady presence in their usual upper-midwest haunts. In June they opened for Cracker and in September they supported The Reverend Peyton's Big Damn Band in the Detroit area, and played some local festivals such as the Michigan Rib Fest and the Hamtramck Music Fest. The sets focused on material from Candy Coated Cannonball but included songs from deep within the catalog, and as the year went on several new tracks were introduced as the band works towards their fifth album.

In March 2022, the band released a retrospective set called Bottled Regrets: The First Ten Years consisting of 3 CDs; Bottled Regrets: The Best Of the First Ten Years, Castaways: Rarities and B-Sides From the First Ten Years, and Patty's Not Impressed: Live in Toronto. In the fall they released their sixth 7" single "Tonight Is Not the Night" b/w "DTW," both on GTG Records.

=== 2023–2025 ===
The Tucos spent 2023 on the road playing the Midwest and deep south and working on demos and pre-production for their fifth album. Their tour took them to Arkansas, Bloomington, IL, Fort Worth, and San Antonio, Texas for the first time and back to some markets they’d been missing like Champaign, Illinois, Louisville, Kentucky, and Memphis, Tennessee. Some of the Texas shows were shared with Austin friends Bottlecap Mountain who The Tucos had hosted earlier in the year in Michigan. They ended 2024 in Toledo for the first time in ten years, supporting Columbus’ Two Cow Garage at Frankie’s.

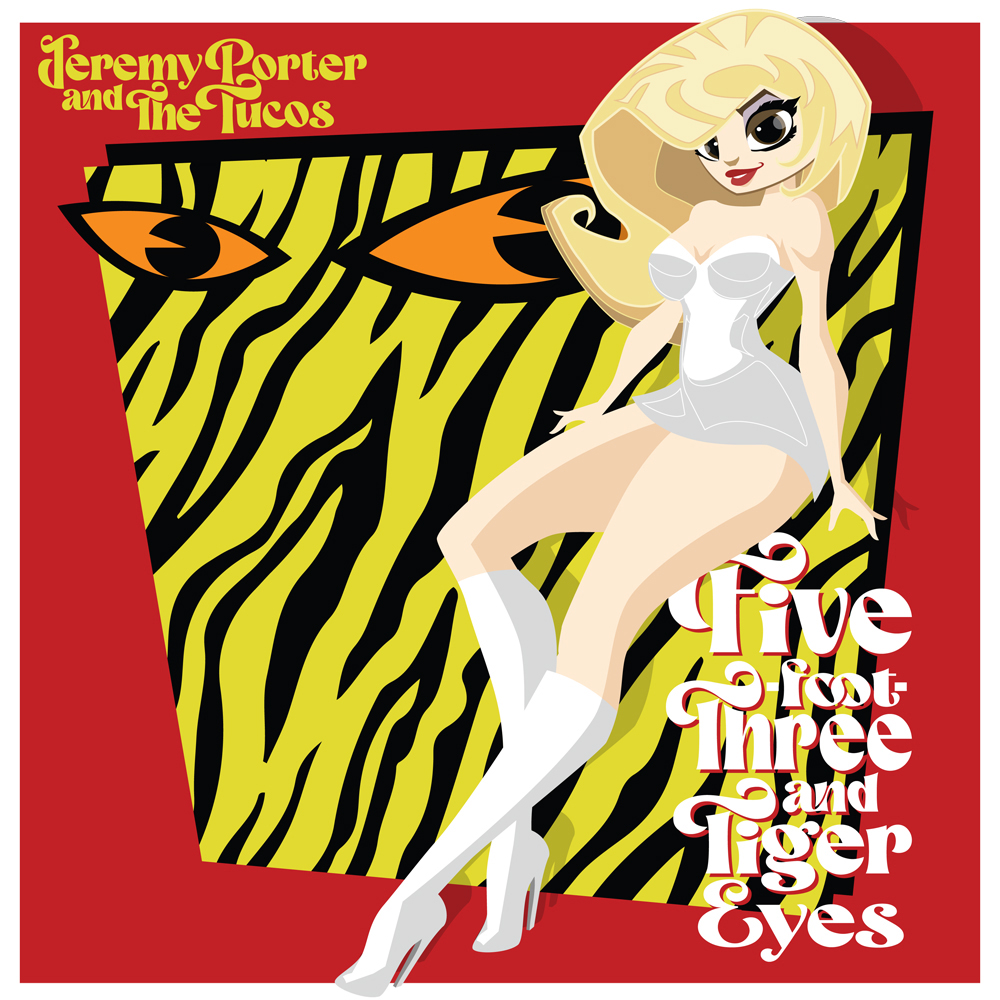
Jeremy Porter and The Tucos - Five-Foot-Three and Tiger Eyes cover artwork by John Johnson

In September they released the 7” vinyl single “Five-Foot-Three and Tiger Eyes” on Detroit’s I94 Recordings label as part of their “Detroit Covers Detroit” series. The title, lyrics, and production of the song are an homage to Nancy Sinatra, whose music and persona Jeremy had become enamored with in recent years. Cover art was done by John Johnson, a Tampa-based artist who Jeremy sought out because of his cover work with Cheap Trick on their Rockford album. The B-side is a cover of The Waxwings “While You Spiral,” staying true to the spirit of the series of Detroit artists covering other Detroit artists. The Tucos supported the release of the single on their fall tour and at their homecoming single-release-show at The Lager House on October 29, 2023.

2024 and 2025 were a quiet years for The Tucos on stage, playing only a few shows while immersed in the studio working on the follow-up to Candy Coated Cannonball. The Tucos cut basic tracks and vocals with engineer/studio-head Steve Presti at Black Sheep Audio in Novi, Michigan, who Jeremy had worked with in the 1990s with SlugBug, and mixed with longtime partner Tim Pataln (of Sponge/The Fags). Meanwhile, Jeremy finished and released his second solo album Dynamite Alley and toured extensively solo-acoustic to support that for the later 2024 and all of 2025. By the end of 2025 the Tucos’ album was being mastered and plans were afoot to resume a more active gig calendar.

In late September/October 2024 JP and The Tucos played shows with Columbus band Watershed, who were supporting their Blow it Up Before it Breaks album (that Jeremy contributed some guitar and vocal work to) on tour stops in Columbus and Detroit. They played a couple local shows in 2025 including support slots for Jon Snodgrass in April and Tim Barry (from Avail) in June, but were otherwise mostly limited to studio work. In December they contributed a new song “Saint Nicotine” to the annual Bermuda Showhawk holiday song compilation. The track was written by Jeremy and featured Troy Toma on drums, while Gabriel engineered the sessions.

== Band members ==
=== Current members ===
- Jeremy Porter – guitars, vocals, organ, piano, harmonica (The Regulars, SlugBug, The Offramps)
- Gabriel Doman – drums, percussion, vocals (The Hotwalls)
- Jake Riley – bass, vocals (Big Shoals, Matt Woods Band, Jake Riley & The Social Workers)

=== Former members ===
- Jason Bowes – bass, vocals (November 2010 – July 2014)
- Patrick O'Harris – bass, vocals (July 2014 – December 2018)
- Bob Moulton – bass, vocals (December 2018 – December 2021)

== Discography ==
=== Albums ===
- Partner In Crime, New Fortune Records (2013)
- Above The Sweet Tea Line, New Fortune Records (2015)
- Don't Worry, It's Not Contagious, GTG Records (2017)
- Candy Coated Cannonball, GTG Records (2021)

=== Retrospective Collections ===
- Bottled Regrets: The Best of the First Ten Years, GTG Records (2022)
- Castaways: Rarities and B-Sides from the First Ten Years, GTG Records (2022)
- Patty's Not Impressed: Live in Toronto, GTG Records (2022)

=== EPs ===
- Live & Acoustic @ The Plymouth Coffee Bean, self-released (2014)
- No Use for Christmas and Other Holiday Favorites, GTG Records (2019)

=== Singles ===
- Night On The Town b/w Ain't My House Anymore, Magwheel Records (2011) 7" Vinyl and digital
- Plan B b/w Throwing Stones, New Fortune Records (2014) 7" Vinyl
- Barrel of Tears b/w Blue Letter, New Fortune Records (2016) 7" Vinyl and digital
- Avenues Are For Heroes b/w Real Damaged Girl, LEESTA VALL Records (2016) 7" Vinyl and digital
- Huckleberry (+2 Live), GTG Records (2017) Digital, ltd. ed. CD
- At Least She's Still In Love With You b/w How About A Beer For Smokey The Bear?, GTG Records (2018) 7" Vinyl and digital
- Dead Ringer / Hummingbird Heartbeat, GTG Records (2021) Digital
- Tonight Is Not the Night b/w DTW, GTG Records (2022) 7" Vinyl
- Five-Foot-Three and Tiger Eyes b/w While You Spiral, I-94 Recordings (2023), 7" Vinyl

=== Compilations ===
- "No Use For Xmas", Suburban Sprawl Records Holiday Compilation (2010)
- "Christmas Dance", Suburban Sprawl Records Holiday Compilation (2011)
- "Silver Bells", Suburban Sprawl Records Holiday Compilation (2012)
- "The Most Wonderful Day of the Year", Suburban Sprawl Records Holiday Compilation (2013)
- "Erase Today", The PRF Tribute Series: Hüsker Dü (2016)
- "Pretty As You Please", Slimtown Singles (2016)
- "Conventional Wisdom", Stronger Than Fear: A Compilation to Benefit the ACLU (2017)
- "Elimination Round (Live)", GTG100 (2017)
- "Lonely Mrs. Claus", Fourth Line Records Holiday Compilation (2017)
- "Christmas Dance", Bermuda Snowhawk (2019)
- "Christmas Dance", Night Shadows - Aldora Britain Records (2020)
- "Eggnog Time Again", Bermuda Snowhawk (2021)
- "Echos Myron", All Good Kids - A Tribute To Guided By Voices - Phonophore Records (2022)
- "The I'm Alone At Christmas and All the Liquor Stores Are Closed Blues", Bermuda Snowhawk (2022)
- "Christmas Lullaby", Bermuda Snowhawk (2023)
- "Put You On Hold (Live in North Little Rock)", Aldora Britain Records, Young River Poet Vol. V: A 50-Song Collection In Support Of 4-Year-Old Loxley Johnson's Fight Against Cancer (2025)
- "Saint Nicotine", Bermuda Snowhawk (2025)
