= The Fifth of July =

Studio album by Watershed
- Released: 2005
- Genres: Power pop, rock
- Length: 32:08
- Label: Idol Records
- Producer: Tim Patalan

Watershed chronology
The More It Hurts, The More It Works (2002)	The Fifth of July (2005)	Three Chords and a Cloud of Dust II (2007)

The Fifth of July is the seventh album by the Power pop band Watershed. It was released in 2005. The songs on the album have been featured on MTV's Date My Mom, Made, and Laguna Beach. In addition, they've been in rotations from South Carolina to Seattle. This album was also the first to feature Mark "Poochie" Borror. Watershed is managed by Thomas O'Keefe, a longtime fan of the band.

== Track listing ==
No.	Title	Length
1.	"Obvious"	2:51
2.	"The Habit"	1:50
3.	"5th Of July"	2:51
4.	"Slowly Then Suddenly"	3:16
5.	"Small Doses"	3:02
6.	"Getting Ready"	3:22
7.	"Laundromat"	2:54
8.	"My Lucky Day"	2:47
9.	"New Depression"	3:01
10.	"Going Through The Motions"	3:46
11.	"The Best Is Yet To Come"	2:28
Total length:		31:08

== Personnel ==
- Colin Gawel – vocals, guitar
- Joe Oestreich – Vocals, bass guitar
- Dave Masica – drums
- Mark "Poochie" Borror – guitar
