= HardDrive (radio show) =

American radio show

hardDrive with Lou Brutus is a two-hour, weekly rock radio show hosted by rock radio veteran Lou Brutus. It is syndicated by United Stations Radio Networks and broadcasts on over 90 stations nationwide. Music industry veteran Roxy Myzal produced both hardDrive, since its early upbringings in 1996, until her retirement at the end of 2017.

Producer Roxy Myzal has won four RadioContraband Rock Radio Awards for "Non-traditional Programmer of the Year" in 2011, 2012, 2013 and 2014.

Lou Brutus won a RadioContraband Rock Radio Award for "Disc Jockey of the Year" in 2013 and "Syndicated DJ of the Year" 2014

== hardDrive XL with Lou Brutus ==
hardDrive XL with Lou Brutus is the weeknight expansion of radio show hardDrive with Lou Brutus. The program is five hours long and airs Monday thru Friday nights. It is syndicated by United Stations Radio Networks and broadcasts on over 30 stations nationwide. It has numerous segments including Ask Lou, hardDrive XL Shout Box, Screen Time, Weird World News, Flix Pix and It Came From the Web.
