= Lou Brutus =

American radio personality (born 1962)

- Born: Luigi Vercotti Brutus; November 10, 1962 (age 63); Newark, New Jersey, U.S.
- Education: Manalapan High School
- Alma mater: Brookdale Community College
- Occupations: Radio personality Radio programmer Voice-over talent musician photographer
- Years active: 1984–present

Lou Brutus (born November 10, 1962) is an American radio personality, program director, voice-over talent, musician, and photographer. He is best known as the host of the nationally syndicated rock radio programs hardDrive with Lou Brutus and hardDrive XL with Lou Brutus, as well as his work at Sirius XM Radio.

== Radio overview ==
As host of hardDrive with Lou Brutus and hardDrive XL with Lou Brutus, as well as through his music programming for Sirius XM Radio, he has assisted in breaking many rock bands in the active rock radio format notably Slipknot, Stone Sour, Avenged Sevenfold, Godsmack, Disturbed, Five Finger Death Punch, Sevendust and Halestorm among others. He was an early hire for XM Satellite Radio, later merged with Sirius Satellite Radio to form Sirius XM Radio, where he has acted as program director, senior program director, disc jockey, interviewer and voice-over talent. Brutus' voiceovers there include acting as the primary voice of the '40s on 4 channel which he based upon Bing Crosby announcer Ken Carpenter. Brutus has also hosted radio specials and created music channels for artists including Metallica, Disturbed, 3 Doors Down, Rush, Theory of a Deadman, Slipknot, Smashing Pumpkins, A Perfect Circle and others. In 2011, Five Finger Death Punch used Brutus to host their military intelligence-themed press conference in Los Angeles, California, for their Trespass America Tour.

== Music overview ==
In the music world, he is creator and lead singer of the comedy-rock bands Dead Schembechlers (a send-up of the Ohio State University versus University of Michigan football rivalry) which he formed with members of the Columbus, Ohio-based band Watershed as well as the Grumpy Old Punks (a band which features comedic punk rock takes on middle aged life). Other novelty flavored music has been released under the monikers Ol' Dirty Brutus (nerdish hip hop music) and Lou Brutus and the Perfect Pachydermus Percussion Pitches (baseball themed tunes). He was a co-writer on the Dash Rip Rock concept album Hee Haw Hell. Early in his career, he created tracks to WMMR's Morning Zoo Abbey Dirt Road and Zoo's Next albums. He has contributed liner notes and or photography to several artists including Frank Zappa, Mary Prankster, The Phenomenauts and The Methadones.

Brutus is a member of both ASCAP and NARAS.

== Photography ==
As a photographer, Brutus has worked on field capturing images of Major League Baseball as an accredited league photographer including home games of the Washington Nationals, New York Mets, Baltimore Orioles, Philadelphia Phillies, Oakland Athletics, Chicago Cubs, Chicago White Sox, San Diego Padres and Los Angeles Dodgers. He has photographed numerous music acts and festivals he has covered during his radio duties. He also frequently photographs lighthouses and American Civil War battlefields as a hobby. He has stated on the air that he as yet does not wish to pursue selling his hobby shots for fear of turning it into work.

== Popular culture ==
In November 1996, guitarist Eddie Van Halen of Van Halen chose The Lou Brutus Experience as the name for the all star band he put together to play the Jason Becker ALS Benefit concert. The group also featured Steve Lukather, Billy Sheehan and Pat Torpey.

Chicago street singer Wesley Willis recorded the song "Lou Brutus" for his 1998 self-released album Rock 'N Roll Jackflash.

Author Elwood Reid included a character named Lou Brutus in his first book D.B.: A Novel.

== Early life ==
=== Birth and education ===
Brutus was born in Newark, New Jersey, on November 10, 1962. At an early age, his family moved to a farm in Englishtown, New Jersey. He is a graduate of Manalapan High School in Manalapan Township where he was active in the theatre program as well as producing music concerts with local rock groups and acting as announcer of the afternoon PA announcements. It was at the suggestion of the school principal that Brutus was invited to be one of four students to record short vignettes for New York City radio station WABC-AM, which would be his first time on the radio. He later attended Brookdale Community College in Lincroft, New Jersey where he was a disc jockey on its radio station WBJB-FM.

=== Early radio influences ===
It was his growing up in Monmouth County in Central New Jersey that Brutus acknowledged as giving him a well-rounded appreciation of the radio world at an early age as signals were received from both the New York City and Philadelphia radio markets as well as the New Jersey stations. He has named radio personality Dan Ingram as a significant, early influence as well as Harry Harrison and Ron Lundy. He has also cited Scott Muni, Alison Steele and Vin Scelsa as others.

== Radio career ==
=== WMMR Philadelphia ===
While attending Brookdale Community College, Brutus began an internship with WMMR in Philadelphia. The internship led to a job as morning show producer for John DeBella and shifts as a weekend disc jockey. He was there in those capacities from 1984 to 1988.

=== WPLJ New York City ===
In 1988 he accepted a job as morning show producer at WPLJ-FM in New York City where he worked with Jim Kerr, Shelli Sonstein and Howard the Cab Driver under Program Director Larry Berger.

=== WHJY Providence – WBCN Boston – WMMR Philadelphia ===
After a brief stint, Brutus left WPLJ-FM to begin his first ever full-time on-air hosting job at WHJY in Providence, Rhode Island. It was at this juncture that he began his trademark of closing his radio programs with a quote from writer Hunter S. Thompson. He met with Thompson twice during this time during appearances by the author at the Somerville Theater outside of Boston, Massachusetts. They stayed in contact until Thompson's death in 2005 including Brutus' unsuccessful attempts to convince the author to host a hybrid music/political program on XM Satellite Radio. Brutus was let go from WHJY in the spring of 1992. He did return for one night in 2003 to host a memorial edition of The Metal Zone in honor of his friend Mike "Dr. Metal" Gonsalves who perished in The Station Nightclub Fire. Shortly after his departure from WHJY, Brutus joined the staff of WBCN-FM in Boston, Massachusetts where he worked weekend and fill in shifts. By fall of that year, Brutus was back at WMMR in Philadelphia as host of the night shift. He remained in this capacity until offered the afternoon drive position at WRCX-FM in Chicago, Illinois.

=== WRCX Chicago ===
It was while at WRCX, dubbed Rock 103.5 on the air, that Brutus began to reach a national audience. During this time he started to host album premiere specials for trade publication Friday Morning Quarterback. He also traveled extensively including being the lone U.S. radio representative at the 1995 Molson Ice Polar Beach Party in Tuktoyaktuk, Canada which featured a private performance by Metallica. Brutus would also host the 1997 Molson Ice Polar Beach in Churchill, Manitoba with a performance by Collective Soul. Despite its success, the station changed formats within a few years. When asked about the station's short life Brutus said, "Its run may not have been as long as some other stations but I am reminded of Joe Turkel's line to Rutger Hauer in Blade Runner, 'The light that burns twice as bright burns for half as long – and you have burned so very, very brightly.'"

=== hardDrive with Lou Brutus ===
While in Chicago, Brutus was approached by industry veteran Corinne Baldassano at the suggestion of Jacobs Media to host a new, nationally syndicated radio program, which would showcase the burgeoning active rock format. hardDrive with Lou Brutus debuted in thirty-five markets on July 4, 1996. Designed as weekend specialty programming, the two-hour, weekly show has since gone on to be heard in over 120 markets throughout the United States. It was originally distributed by Sony SW Networks later moving to distribution through Media America and then United Stations Radio Networks. The show has been cited as an influence by hard rock and metal musicians including Breaking Benjamin and Corey Taylor of Slipknot who listened to the program while working at an Iowa porn shop as he plotted his path to stardom.

=== hardDrive XL with Lou Brutus ===
In 2007, a five-hour, weeknight version was launched and has gone on to be heard in over forty markets in the United States. The program's features include Rant of the Day, Poetry Corner, Weird World News, Odd and Ends, Flix Pix, Are You Game and It Came From the Web. In 2011, Lzzy Hale of the band Halestorm was added to the program doing an "Ask Lzzy" segment where she answered personal questions from the audience.

=== WHFS Washington, DC ===
Brutus left Chicago in 1998 to accept the morning show host position with WHFS-FM in Washington, D.C. He left in 1999.

=== Sirius XM Satellite Radio ===
In late 2000, Brutus accepted the position of program director at XM Satellite Radio where he began in early 2001.

==== Special X ====
It was at XM that Brutus began the genre bending Special X channel which mixed varied musical and spoken word formats into a bizarre amalgam known as Weirdness on Special X. Wired described the programming as, "Bizarre enough to make Dr. Demento woozy...a wild mix of wacky theme programming and 'categorically challenged' music." Brutus appeared on channel in the character of Generalissimo "Stoshu" Ortega during vignettes produced to sound like Cold War era Communist propaganda broadcasts promoting weird music instead of politics. The other regular channel voice was actor Joe Turkel. Special X also hosted themed programming like the baseball-centric "Play Ball" and the novelty holiday Special X-Mas programming. For Valentine's Day it featured The One I Love Ripped Out My Heart and Fed it to a Pack of Wild Dogs Anti-Valentine's Day Spectacular. Additionally, the channel presented a two-hour daily program of strange cover songs entitled Cover Songs That Give You a Burning in Your Esophagus.

==== Fungus 53 ====
When Special X was dropped from the line up in 2008, Brutus was tasked with creating the first ever punk rock radio station Fungus 53. Assistant programmer on the channel was DJ Russ Brown. The channel became respected enough for its support of the genre that it was celebrated by punk band NOFX in the song "Fungus". The song featured the lyrics, "I hate the radio but I like Fungus. The only punk-rock station, it's humongous. I think they just play Misfit's Walk among us. Fungus 53."

==== Director of programming ====
After the punk rock format and channel were axed in 2008, Brutus was named as Senior Program Director of the Active Rock format. This has included working with Sirius XM Radio channels Octane, Liquid Metal, Rock Bar, Faction and The Grateful Dead Channel as well as creating the Mandatory Metallica limited run channel.

==== Artist Confidential ====
Brutus became host for the Artist Confidential Series following the death of original host George Taylor Morris. The long form music and interview series put Brutus together with artists as diverse as James Taylor, Evanesence, KoRn, Hank Williams Jr., Smashing Pumpkins, Shinedown, Harry Connick Jr., Weezer, Cheap Trick, Indigo Girls, Snow Patrol, Reba McEntire, Fall Out Boy, Eddie Money, Wynonna, Megadeth, The Oak Ridge Boys, Graham Nash, David Gray, Chicago, George Thorogood, Testament, The Fray and many more. He has criticized the Rock Radio format in regard to its artists relations, "I believe the rock end of the business needs to get its act together much in the way that country did when it comes to making artists a more integral part of each radio station. Management and labels need to step up and make their artists available to the stations. On radio's end, you must do a great job every time an artist is taking time out of their probably already overworked schedule. We on the radio have got to make the artists feel like they have to be on the air with us or they're missing out on something. Both sides need to respect each other, help each other and feed off each other."

=== Layoff ===
After 22 years with SiriusXM, Brutus was one of 475 employees who were laid off in March 2023.

=== Outside Endeavors ===
In 1992, Brutus began a series of comic books entitled "The Adventures of Brutusman." The comics featured other personalities and characters from his radio show including Sammy the Seal. The comics were drawn by Alan MacBain. An online only version, meant to be downloaded and colored, was released in 2010 under the title "Brutusman: The Dark Nut Returns." The comic was again drawn by MacBain and written by Brutus.

Brutus has produced at least two micro-brewed beers including "Brew Loutus Ale" and "Lou-In-Brau." They were produced thru local beer brewers in the Providence, RI and Chicago, IL areas. Label design for each beer was by Alan MacBain.

Lou Brutus won the Radio Contraband Rock Radio Award for "Dj of the Year" for 2013 and 2014 for "Syndicated DJ of the Year"

== Music career ==
=== Dead Schembechlers ===
In 2004, Lou Brutus teamed with Colin Gawel and Joe Oestreich of the Columbus, OH based rock band Watershed to form the group Dead Schembechlers. The group took a satirical look at the football rivalry between Ohio State University and the University of Michigan, named the greatest sports rivalry of all time by ESPN. Named for former Michigan head coach Bo Schembechler, The Dead Schembechlers featured pro-OSU/anti-Michigan songs like "Michigan Stadium is A Pile of Shit," Ann Arbor Girls Are Dirty Whores," and "I Hate Michigan." Full length albums from the group include "Rocket to Ann Arbor," "Wolverine Destroyer," and "Rodriguez to Ruin," which also featured artwork by Alan MacBain. . Each band member took a first name of "Bo" and the last name of a famous punk rocker with Brutus becoming lead singer Bo Biafra, the last name a nod to Jello Biafra of the Dead Kennedys. While finding an early champion in Columbus, OH radio station WWCD-FM, the group's no-holds barred approach immediately garnered negative press including the November 19, 2004 front page of the Detroit Free Press with the headline "OSU Punks Rip into U-M Rivals." Brutus as Biafra appeared alongside footage of the band in the HBO documentary "Michigan vs Ohio State: The Rivalry" with one pro-Michigan reviewer calling his on camera appearance "awful." The band announced their retirement following Bo Schembechler's death just a few hours before their 2006 "Hate Michigan Rally." They have since sporadically reformed with proceeds going to the Bo Schembechler Heart of Champion Fund charity.

=== Grumpy Old Punks ===
Brutus joined with old school friends K Roy of the band Jehovah Waitresses and Guzda in 2011 for the band Grumpy Old Punks. Like the Dead Schembechlers, their music rooted in classic punk rock, with lyrics spoofing the problems of middle aged men. The band released the EP "Grumpy Old Punks" in 2011 and "Anarchy in the Prostate" in 2012. Artwork for both albums provided by underground cartoonist Derf Backderf. Song titles include "My Adjustable Rate Mortgage Sucks," "That's No MILF That's My Wife," and "Gotta Get A Nose Hair Trimmer."
