= Erica Blinn =

American singer

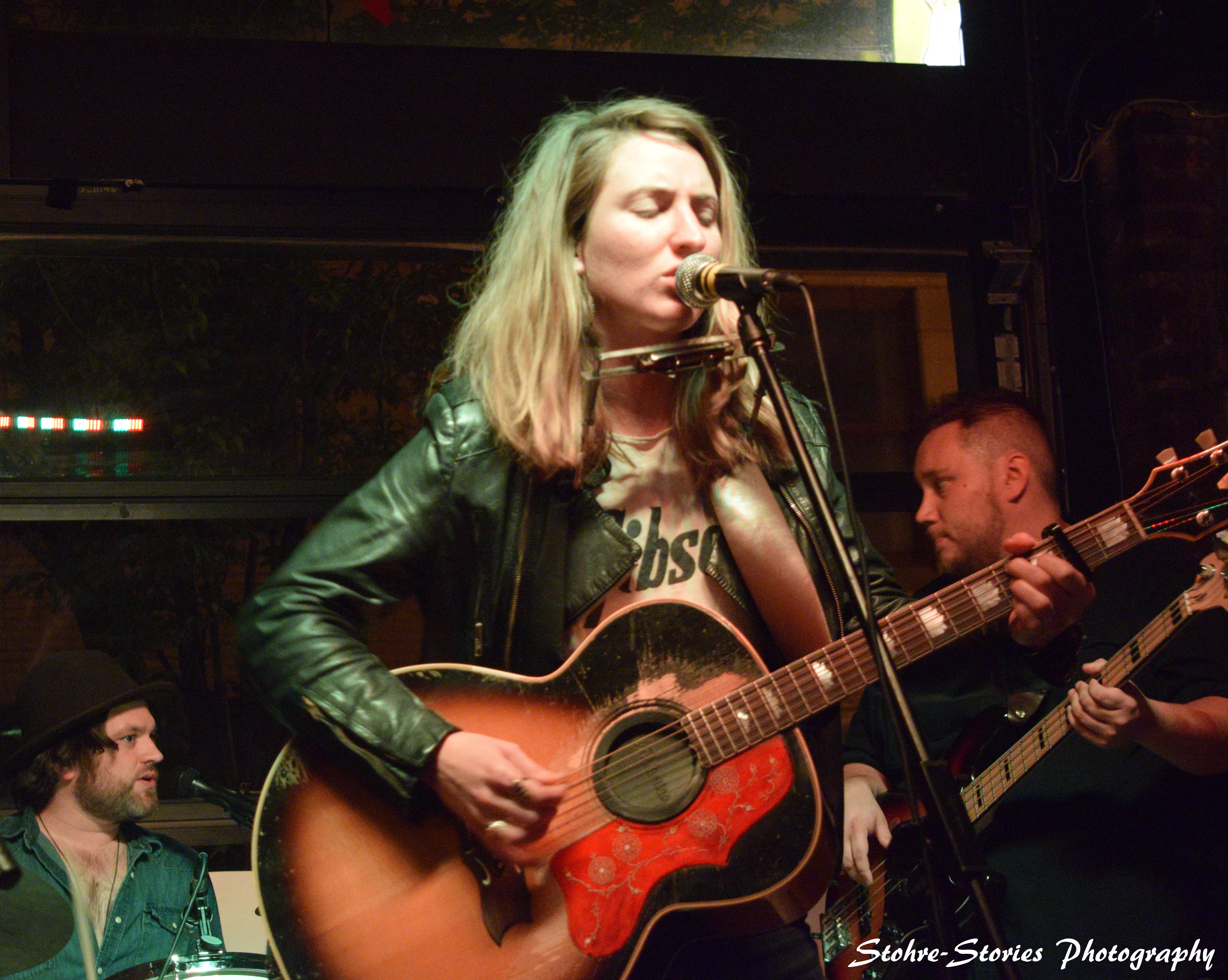
- Erica Blinn performing at Suzie's Dogs and Drafts in Youngstown, Ohio
- Citizenship: United States
- Occupation: Musician

Erica Blinn is an American Rock artist based out of Nashville, TN. She is originally from Worthington, Ohio, a suburb of Columbus, OH. She learned everything about guitar and harmonica from her dad, Jerry. She started playing the harmonica when she was only 14 and started playing the bars then too. The harmonica turned into a guitar, and soon enough she was singing to the sound of her guitar. Erica Blinn played in numerous bands in high school, and in college too.

== Career ==
She met Colin Gawel after finding him after one of his concerts. She and Gawel began practicing together. Colin Gawel helped Blinn launch her solo career just a few years ago. Her first album, Lovers In The Dust, was produced with Mike Landolt. She practices with guitar player, Andy Harrison, as well.

Blinn records at the Curry House Records in Nashville, TN.

Her band members are Erica Blinn - Guitarist, Vocalist; PJ Schreiner - Backup Vocalist, Drummer; Will Newsome - Guitarist; Andrew Leahey - Backup Vocalist, Guitarist.
