= The Waxwings =

American rock band

- Origin: Detroit, Michigan, USA
- Genre: Indie rock
- Years active: 1997–2005
- Labels: Bobsled, Rainbow Quartz, Cass, Schnitzel Records Ltd.
- Members: Dean Fertita; James Edmunds; Kevin Peyok
- Past members: Dominic Romano
- Website: www.thewaxwings.com

The Waxwings were an American rock band, formed in 1997 in Detroit, Michigan.

The band's lineup comprised Dean Fertita on vocals and guitar, James Edmunds on drums and percussion, and Kevin Peyok on bass guitar. Brendan Benson filled in on guitar for touring, following the departure of guitarist/vocalist Dominic Romano.

They released three full-length albums: Low to the Ground in 2000, Shadows Of... in 2002, and Let's Make Our Descent in 2004. The band's music was influenced by 1960s psychedelic pop and folk rock, featuring rich, complex instrumentation and vocal harmonies which separate them from the raw garage rock revival scene in Detroit.

The Waxwings toured with Guided By Voices, Travis, Matthew Sweet, The Strokes, and fellow Detroit band The White Stripes.

== History ==
=== Formation ===
The band was formed by Dean Fertita, after a friend booked a show for him at Arlene's Grocery in New York five days later. At the time, Fertita was working at the independent Detroit record store Off the Record with bassist Kevin Peyok, and invited him to play the show. Peyok contacted drummer James Edmunds and guitarist Dominic Romano, and the lineup was complete. The band's name, as well as the name of their debut record, was derived from the first line of a poem in Vladimir Nabokov's novel Pale Fire:

I was the shadow of the waxwing slain
By the false azure in the windowpane

Previously, Romano and Peyok had played together in the shoegaze band Glider along with The Sights' Mike Trombley.

=== Low to the Ground ===
While working at Off the Record, Fertita met Bob Salerno, the head of Chicago's Bobsled Records, while he was in Detroit searching for bands to sign. Fertita recommended music from Detroit bands The Go and The White Stripes, but did not mention that he was also a musician. A few months later, Salerno contacted Fertita, expressing interest in the Waxwings. The Waxwings signed with Bobsled Records and began work on their debut album, Low to the Ground, recorded at Terrarium Studios in Minneapolis, Minnesota with Bryan Hanna.

The album was released on May 2, 2000, to positive reviews from critics:

The Waxwings don't so much re-create the past as learn from it; their acid-tweaked tunefulness is broad enough to embrace lullaby wistfulness ("Sleepy Head"), twang-pop ("Firewood") and jaunty orchestrations ("Low Ceiling")

— Greg Kot, Rolling Stone Magazine, (2000)

Low to the Ground was featured in Magnet Magazine's Top 20 albums of 2000-2001. As well, the White Stripes have performed a live cover of Fragile Girl with Beck.

The Waxwings toured in support of Low to the Ground for 15 months, then returned to the studio to record their second album.

=== Shadows Of... ===
Once again recorded at Minnesota's Terrarium Studios, The Waxwings' second album, Shadows Of..., was released on Bobsled Records on July 11, 2002.

Following the release of Shadows of... in 2002, Bob Salerno sent the band an expletive-filled letter ridiculing them for what he considered a poor performance at their CD release party. The letter gained notoriety after being posted on the internet entertainment forum the Velvet Rope.

[Salerno] sent me a letter via e-mail and I told him if he wanted to talk to us about it, he could but it was ridiculous... I thought it was so absurd. I wasn't even going to show the band. But then he sent it certified to us, four copies, since we were living together at that time. So all of us would have to sign for it to get it. But we all disregarded it until it became the talk of the town.

— Fertita, (2004)

During this period, guitarist Dominic Romano got married and left the band.

The band separated from Bobsled, although the label still retained the rights to their third record. After hearing Shadows Of... through mutual friend Matt Smith (of Outrageous Cherry), Rainbow Quartz Records offered to free the Waxwings from their contract with Bobsled.

=== Let's Make Our Descent ===
Their third album, Let's Make Our Descent was recorded with Brendan Benson at Grand Studio in Detroit, and released on August 13, 2004. Benson and Fertita had attended Kimball High School in Royal Oak, Michigan together, and Fertita played guitar in Benson's band when scheduling allowed, as well as touring with him. For the Waxwings' 2005 tour, Benson assumed duties as the band's temporary guitarist.

Working with Brendan is great as we have known each other for such a long time. He wasn't afraid to challenge us and think outside the patterns we developed over the last few years. Bob [Salerno] got a producing credit on our first record, but he didn't have much to do with it at all. We were new to the label and didn't really stand up for ourselves early on.

— Fertita, (2005)

== Current projects ==
The news page of the Waxwings official site states that the band has begun working on songs for the fourth album. This was last updated in 2005.

In Spring 2007, Dean Fertita joined Queens of the Stone Age as the keyboardist for their sixth record, Era Vulgaris, taking over for Natasha Shneider. He toured with the band through Fall 2008, and in August 2008 was expected to go into the studio with the band to record their next album. As well, Fertita is the guitarist and one of the main songwriters of supergroup The Dead Weather, which includes the Kills' Alison Mosshart and fellow Detroit musicians Jack White and Jack Lawrence.

Kevin Peyok is now in London-based band The See See. The See See have toured with the Raconteurs and plan to release their debut LP in 2009.

== Cover versions ==
Detroit-based band Jeremy Porter and The Tucos covered The Waxwings' "While You Spiral" as the B-side of their "Five-Foot-Three and Tiger Eyes" 7" single for I-94 Recordings as part of their "Detroit Covers" series where bands record an original song for the a-side and cover a Detroit band for the B-side.

== Discography ==
Date of release	Title	Record label
May 2, 2000	Low to the Ground	Bobsled Records
July 11, 2002	Shadows Of...	Bobsled Records
August 13, 2004	Let's Make Our Descent	Rainbow Quartz
