= Watershed (American band) =

American rock band

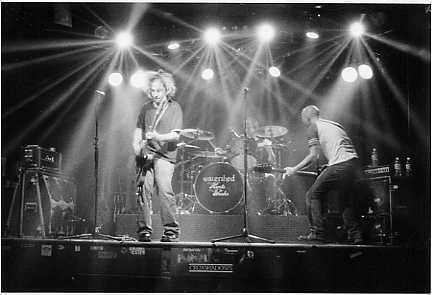
- Watershed in 2002. L-R: Colin Gawel, Dave Masica, Joe Oestreich

Background information
- Origin: Columbus, Ohio, United States
- Genres: Rock, power pop
- Years active: 1987–present
- Labels: Idol, Carney, Thunder Creek, Epic, B Minus, Palas, Bravo
- Spinoffs: Dead Schembechlers
- Members: Colin Gawel; Joe Oestreich; Rick Kinsinger; Herb Schupp
- Past members: Dave Masica; Joe Peppercorn; Mark "Poochie" Borror
- Website: http://www.watershedcentral.com http://waterpukes.squarespace.com/

Watershed is an American rock band based in Columbus, Ohio, consisting of Colin Gawel (guitar, vocals), Joe Oestreich (bass, vocals), Rick Kinsinger (guitar, piano), Herb Schupp (drums). Their songs have appeared in several television shows, including Gene Simmons Family Jewels, Laguna Beach, and The Dudesons. Several members of Watershed formed The Dead Schembechlers, a punk band based on the Ohio State-Michigan rivalry. Watershed has appeared on tour with several other bands, including the shock-rap group Insane Clown Posse. Watershed is managed by Thomas O'Keefe, a longtime fan of the band.

== Members ==
Current members:

- Joe Oestreich (bass and vocals) is a professor of English at Coastal Carolina University. He has published essays in magazines such as Esquire and Sports Illustrated and in the literary journals Ninth Letter and Fourth Genre. Several of his essays have been shortlisted for Houghton Mifflin Harcourt's Best American Essays series. Oestreich's memoir about Watershed, entitled Hitless Wonder: A Life in Minor League Rock and Roll, was released by Lyons Press in June 2012.
- Colin Gawel (guitar and vocals) Owns Colin's Coffee in Upper Arlington, OH and founded the website Pencilstorm.com. He also performs and releases music as both a solo artist and with The League Bowlers. His band, Why Isn't Cheap Trick in the Rock and Roll Hall of Fame? disbanded when Cheap Trick got inducted into the Rock and Roll Hall of Fame.
- Rick Kinsinger (guitar) previously played in Ohio-based bands Pfifer and The Blasphemy Saints. He has also played in Colin Gawel & the Lonely Bones and currently plays in The League Bowlers. He is an engineer who has recorded tracks for the Dead Schembechlers, Watershed, Colin Gawel and The League Bowlers.
- Herb Schupp (drums) is an original member of the band and was friends with Oestreich and Gawel in high school. He also plays in The League Bowlers and is known for his love of spicy food.

Former members:

- Mark "Poochie" Borror was a touring guitarist and still plays in the power pop band Twin Cam.
- Joe Peppercorn (piano and guitar) is a classically trained pianist and a bartender in Columbus. Aside from Watershed, he is locally known for performing the entire Beatles catalog in single 13-hour sessions. He also writes and performs with The Whiles.
- Dave Masica played drums with the band from 1998 - 2013 before back problems led to his retirement from performing.

== History ==
The group formed in 1987 when the four founding members were still teenagers. After being signed to Epic Records in the mid-1990s, they were dropped by the label in favor of Silverchair. In 1998, Watershed toured with controversial shock-rap duo Insane Clown Posse, with Gawel saying that "It's a really harsh crowd, but they like us because we're rock and roll survivors."

A lyric from Watershed's song "Black Concert T-Shirt" provides the title for Pulitzer Prize finalist Lee Martin's novel Break the Skin. The band also makes an appearance in the book itself.

In 2012, Oestreich released Hitless Wonder, a memoir about his years in Watershed. Although the band had largely faded from popularity, the book received national media attention.

The band released a single in 2016 featuring two new songs produced by Tim Patalan. As of this time, original drummer Herb Schupp had rejoined the band and longtime collaborator Rick Kinsinger replaced Joe Peppercorn, who was involved in his own band.

In August 2019, the Watershed Hullabaloo featured the band performing shows on three consecutive days in their hometown of Columbus, Ohio. All the shows sold out and the band played 74 different original songs over the three day period. In January 2020 they began working on a new EP with producer Tim Patalan with plans for a summer 2020 release.

=== Dead Schembechlers ===
In 2004, two of the original Watershed members, Gawel and Oestreich, joined with vocalist Lou Brutus and Twin Cam guitarist Mike Sammons on drums to form the punk band Dead Schembechlers based on the Ohio State-Michigan football game and rivalry. The side project's name, a play on the Dead Kennedys, was a lighthearted jab at former Michigan coach Bo Schembechler, who upon hearing about the band name was reportedly quite amused. The four members go by the pseudonyms of Bo Vicious (after Sex Pistols frontman Sid Vicious), Bo Biafra (after Jello Biafra of the Dead Kennedys), Bo Scabies (after Rat Scabies of The Damned), and Bo Thunders (after Johnny Thunders). The group quickly gained more popularity than Watershed itself.

Following Schembechler's death on November 17, 2006, the Dead Schembechlers changed their name to the "Bastard Sons of Woody", a reference to former Ohio State coach Woody Hayes. The band chose to respect their team's former opponent rather than becoming infamous, with Oestreich stating: "If we were a legit, safety-pin-in-the-ear punk band, we would have left the sign and issued a statement saying, We're glad the bastard croaked, and we sincerely hope crows are eating his eyes this very minute. But we're hot-dog-and-a-ball-game guys. With wives and kids and mortgages. Our fans are football fans, not punk rockers."

The band plays many anti-Wolverine songs to the tune of rock "legends" such as Kiss and The Ramones. A long-running joke on the official Dead Schembechlers website claims they originally wrote the tunes and other bands just stole the riffs. The band 'claims' to have released numerous singles and albums throughout the years, but in reality they only released two albums. In 2004 the album Rocket to Ann Arbor was released and soon after re-released as Wolverine Destroyer with a new track and alternate versions of existing songs.

The band "reunited" under the Dead Schembechlers name in 2008, and released a new EP, entitled "Rodriguez to Ruin", which poked fun at Wolverines head football coach Rich Rodriguez. Singles from the new release included "Rodriguez is a Weasel" (which the band claims was used as inspiration for the Toledo Rockets' upset of Michigan); and "I'm So Bored with the SEC." The band played two live concerts in 2008; their Cleveland show was their first to be scheduled outside of Columbus.

== Discography ==
=== Studio albums ===
- Watershed (1991)
- The Carpet Cliff (1992)
- Twister & Other Low Budget Storms (1993)
- Twister (1995) (Epic Records)
- Star Vehicle (1997, Re-released in 1998 as Star Vehicle '98)
- The More It Hurts, The More It Works (2002) (Idol Records)
- The Fifth of July (2005) (Idol)
- Three Chords and a Cloud of Dust II (2007) (Idol)
- Brick & Mortar (2012) (Curry House Records)
- Blow It Up Before It Breaks (2024) (B Minus Records)

=== EPs ===
- First Time Around (1987, Released under The Wire)
- '89 (1989, Released under The Wire)
- Three Chords and a Cloud of Dust (1994) (Epic)
- Watershed / Hoarse Split (1997) (Idol)
- Still Love X-mas (1998)
- Extended Player (August, 2020) (B Minus)

=== Singles ===
- "Twister" b/w "Atlantic City" (1993)
- "How Do You Feel?" (1995) (Epic)
- "Star Vehicle" (1998) (Thunder Creek Records)
- "Black Concert T-Shirt" (1998) (Thunder Creek)
- "The Single Series: Volume One" (2000) (B Minus Records)
- "The Single Series: Volume Two" (2001) (B Minus)
- "The Single Series: Volume Three" (2004) (B Minus)
- "5th of July: Single & Video" (2006) (Idol)
- "Sticky Bomb" (2011)
- "American Muscle" (2011)
- "The Single Series: Volume Four" (2016)
