= Colin Gawel =

American rock musician

Colin Gawel (born 1969 in Worthington, Ohio), is co-founder, lead singer and guitarist of the American rock band Watershed who he formed with Joe Oestreich (vocals, bass) and Herb Schupp (drums) while they were still in middle school. The band is active to this day. Colin also performs and releases music as a solo artist and with his side project, The League Bowlers. He also is a member of the Dead Schembechlers and Why Isn't Cheap Trick in the Rock and Roll Hall of Fame? Since 2006 he has been the owner/operator at Colin's Coffee. In 2018 it was named business of the year in Upper Arlington, Ohio. This is also the spot where he founded the website Pencilstorm.com and where he does most of his writing.

== Early life ==
In first grade he was exposed to the record KISS Alive and shortly thereafter was gifted his first acoustic guitar for Christmas. He later purchased a Gibson Melody Maker with money saved up from his Columbus Dispatch paper route. He began writing songs and formed his first band "The Wire" in 7th grade along with classmates Joe Oestreich (bass) and Herb Schupp (drums). All three entered Ohio State together and after receiving an encouraging phone call from Chris Blackwell at Island Records, decided to drop out of school and pursue music full-time. As he promised his late mom, he did graduate from college in 2001.

== Career ==
The trio changed their name to Watershed and began relentlessly touring the eastern United States opening for established regional acts like Dash Rip Rock, Cowboy Mouth, Hootie and The Blowfish etc. Producer Jim Steinman heard a cassette version of "How Do You Feel" and soon after convinced Richard Griffiths to sign the band to Epic Records with Frankie LaRocca acting as A&R. The band recorded their Epic debut "Twister" at the Powerstation in New York City in 1994 while his late mom battled terminal cancer.

Watershed has toured with bands ranging from the Smithereens to the Insane Clown Posse and remain active to this day.

In 2007, Watershed went on hiatus so that Joe Oestreich could focus on becoming an author. Colin began recording solo material with producer Mike Landolt (Maroon 5) at Mike's Curry House in Columbus, Ohio. The pair decided to bypass the full-length CDs and focused on singles. The first, "Chemotherapy" was released May 9, 2009 and it inserted itself into the national debate on health care as a rallying cry for reform. Two more EPs followed: Superior and Still Love Christmas. He also co-wrote many tracks with Erica Blinn, for her debut Lovers in the Dust which was also produced by Mike Landolt.

"Superior" was Colin's best received single and got heavy airplay in the Columbus, Ohio area along with some minor play along the East Coast. The video features Colin's son Owen playing the character of "Joe".

His band, Colin Gawel and the Lonely Bones, performed at the Rock and Roll Hall of Fame for the Bruce Springsteen Fanfest Weekend for their second ever show They also performed at Columbus's ComFest among others and were active throughout the Midwest during this period. Members were Rick Kinsinger (guitar, keys) Herb Schupp (Drums) and Dan Cochran (Bass). They play a show on Dec 23rd every year known as the "Still Love Christmas" show.

Also in 2007, Colin opened Colin's Coffee in Upper Arlington, Ohio. He is a hands-on owner and can be found there most mornings when he is not traveling for music. In 2018 Colin's Coffee was named Upper Arlington Business of the Year. The store features a large collection of rock 'n' roll books.

Colin was a featured character in Joe Oestreich's critically acclaimed memoir, Hitless Wonder - A life in Minor League Rock n Roll released by Lyons Press in June 2012. The book was featured on National Public Radio's Weekend Edition. It was well received by major news outlets such as The Washington Post The book rekindled a national interest in the music of Colin's band Watershed.

In 2013, Colin founded the website Pencilstorm.com and it replaced Colingawel.com as his primary creative writing outlet and features a rotating cast of roughly 20 writers focusing on pop culture and sports. It is still an active website.

Colin is a noted Cheap Trick super fan who started the band "Why Isn't Cheap Trick in the Rock n Roll Hall of Fame?" in 2012. Watershed has opened for Cheap Trick in the past and remain friendly. The band would perform free sets of all Cheap Trick music to rally fans to support Cheap Trick's bid to be included in the Rock and Roll Hall of Fame.

In 2014, Colin founded The Willie Phoenix Tribute Machine to pay tribute to Columbus legend Willie Phoenix. The band included members of The New Bomb Turks and Howlin' Maggie and released two songs written by Willie Phoenix, produced by Mike Landolt and engineered by Rick Kinsinger. It is being released on a vinyl 45 for RSD 2019. Colin also started Shadowlords - The Willie Phoenix Fanpages on Facebook for a place to share Willie music and photos.

In June 2015, Colin reformed his band The League Bowlers to perform at Comfest in Columbus. The League Bowlers feature Willie Phoenix alumni Jim Johnson (drums) and Mike Parks (guitar) and Four String Brew founder Dan Cochran (Big Back 40) on bass. The band released one critically acclaimed record, Some Balls, in 2004 before breaking up on stage at the Thirsty Ear Tavern in 2008. The League Bowlers' Some Balls Deluxe was released in December 2018. Lead guitarist Mike Parks passed away soon afterward and the original Bowlers line-up disbanded. Mike recorded some of his tracks from the hospice with Rick Kinsinger engineering.

In December 2015 Colin was featured in a story in (614) Magazine previewing the release of his new record Superior - The Best of Colin Gawel. This release is an 18 track compilation of his solo work outside of his music with Watershed, produced by Mike Landolt for Curry House Records. Also mentioned in the article were the success of his side project, "Why Isn't Cheap Trick in the Rock and Roll Hall of Fame?" and his website Pencilstorm.com.

In October 2016, a video for the song, "Dad Can't Help You Now" was released and features Colin's son Owen playing the batter. In 2019, Colin disbanded The Lonely Bones and a new version The League Bowlers became his primary backing band.

He still owns Colin's Coffee in Upper Arlington, Ohio and plays gigs on occasion.

== Discography ==
Chemotherapy (2009) - Called "exceptionally strong" by the Columbus Other Paper
Superior (2010) - Was released on February 5, 2010, Still Love Christmas (2010) - Released on December 1, 2010.

Official Bootleg: Live at the Rock and Roll Hall of Fame: Bruce Springsteen Fanfest Weekend 6/13/2009 (2009)

Superior - The Best of Colin Gawel was released on December 28, 2015, on CurryHouse records.

The League Bowlers - Some Balls Deluxe was released December 2018.
